= Royal British Veterans Enterprise =

- Royal British Veterans Enterprise
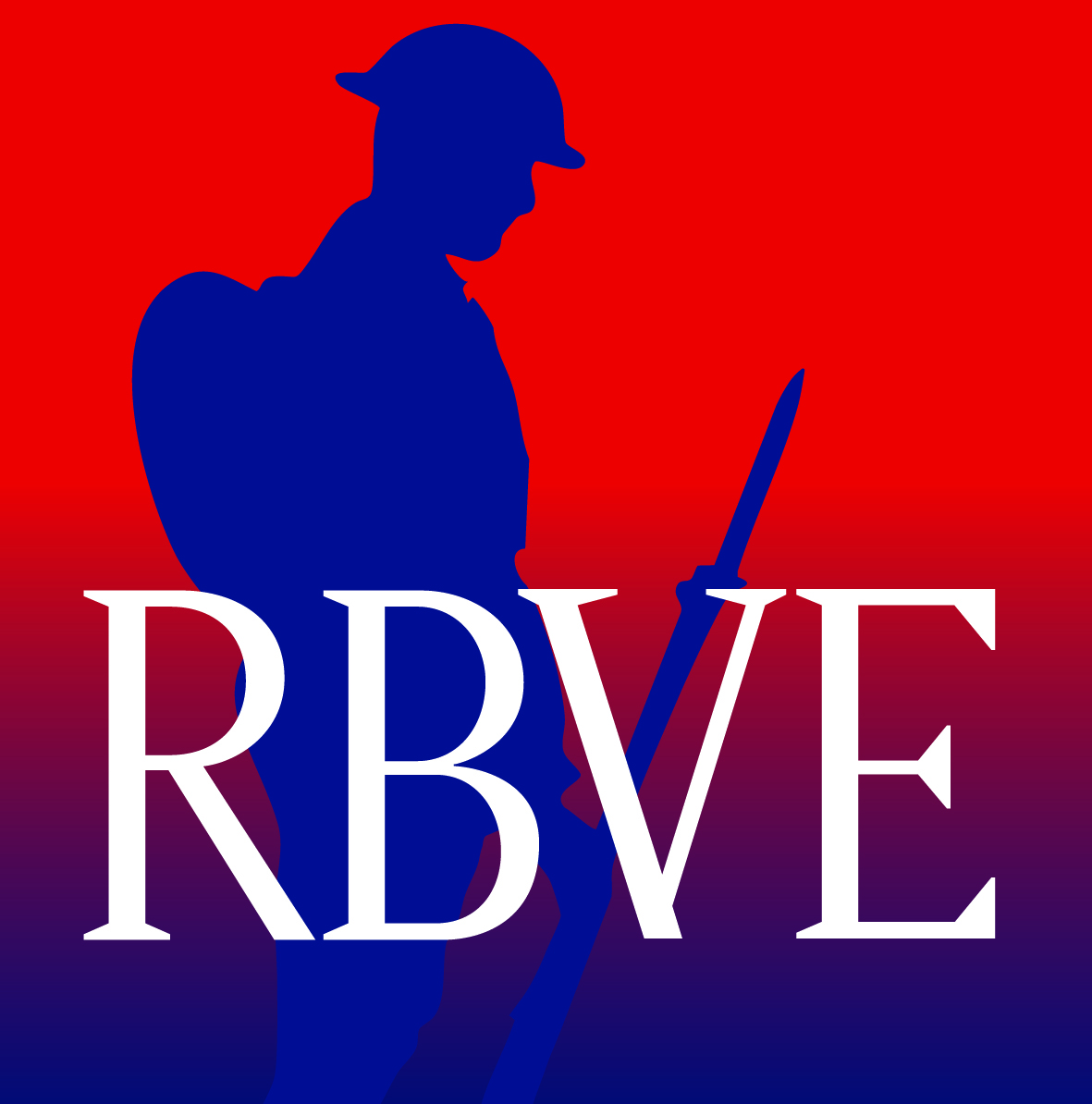
- Abbreviation: RBVE
- Formation: September 1919
- Type: Ex-service organisation
- Registration no.: 210063 / SC048795
- Legal status: Charity
- Purpose: Supporting members of the Armed Forces Community through inclusive housing, employment, and care.
- Headquarters: Aylesford, Kent
- Region served: UK
- Chief Executive Officer: Lisa Farmer, OBE
- Patron: Her Royal Highness The Duchess of Kent
- Subsidiaries: Britain's Bravest Manufacturing Company (BBMC) Scotland's Bravest Manufacturing Company (SBMC) Lifeworks
- Website: https://rbve.org.uk/

Royal British Veterans Enterprise (RBVE) is a charity based in Aylesford, Kent, England that helps Armed Forces veterans, disabled people and people who are unemployed. It runs a social enterprise, Britain's Bravest Manufacturing Company, and a UK-wide employment support programme for Armed Forces veterans, Lifeworks.

RBVE (charity number 210063) is a separate charity from The Royal British Legion (charity number 219279).

== History ==
RBVE was established in 1919 to support WW1 Armed Forces veterans fighting tuberculosis. First known as Industrial Settlements Inc, the charity was originally run from Preston Hall in Aylesford.

In 2013 the charity won Charity of the Year at the Charity Times Awards.

In 2016, they relaunched their social enterprise, naming it Britain's Bravest Manufacturing Company.

In 2017, they opened 24 new apartments for wounded, injured and homeless veterans.

In 2019, On 6 November 2019 Queen Elizabeth II officially opened the new Appleton Lodge care facility and visited the Centenary Village housing project.

In 2022, RBVE were selected as part of the Telegraph's Christmas charity Appeal. One of four chosen charities supported in the appeal.

The charity changed its name from Royal British Legion Industries (RBLI) to Royal British Veterans Enterprise (RBVE) in November 2025.
