= White Horse Stone =

Two megaliths near Aylesford, Kent, England

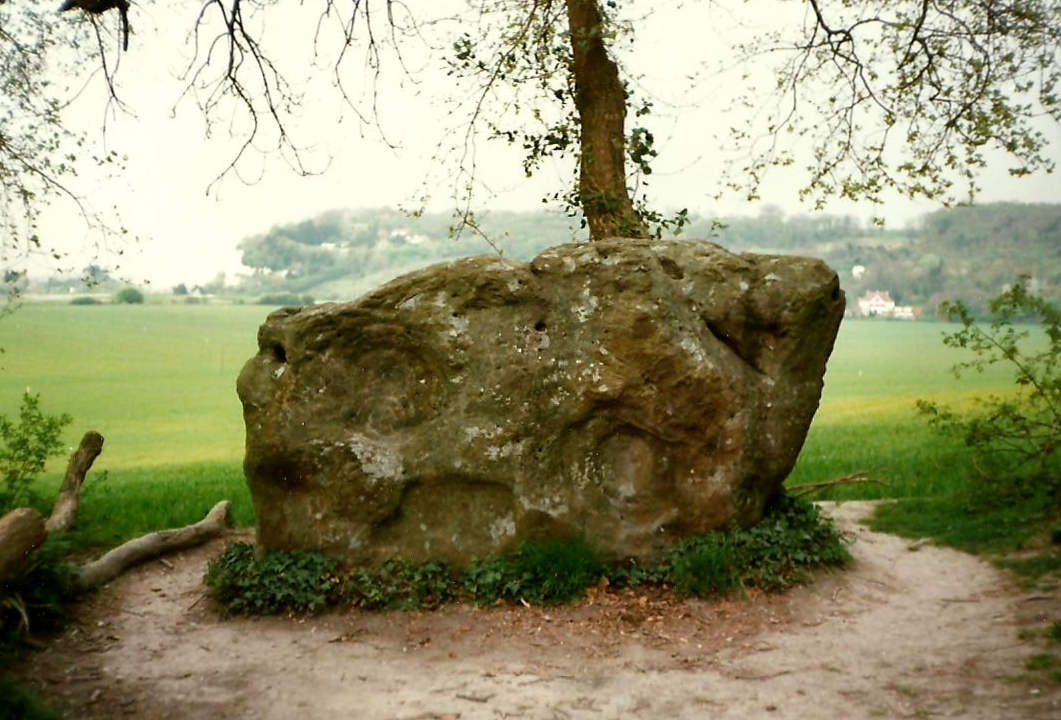
- The Upper White Horse Stone

- Location within Kent
- 51.314969°N 0.514735°E
- Type: Monolith; putative Long barrow

The White Horse Stone is a name given to two separate sarsen megaliths on the slopes of Blue Bell Hill, near the village of Aylesford in the south-eastern English county of Kent. The Lower White Horse Stone was destroyed prior to 1834, at which time the surviving Upper White Horse Stone took on its name and folkloric associations. Various archaeologists have suggested—although not proven—that the stones were each part of chambered long barrows constructed in the fourth millennium BC, during Britain's Early Neolithic period.

If the White Horse Stones were originally components of chambered long barrows, then they would have been erected by pastoralist communities shortly after the introduction of agriculture to Britain from continental Europe. Long-barrow building was an architectural tradition widespread across Neolithic Europe although comprised various localised regional variants; one of these was in the vicinity of the River Medway, examples of which are now known as the Medway Megaliths. The White Horse Stones lie on the eastern side of the river, along with the chambered long barrows of Little Kit's Coty House, Kit's Coty House, the (now destroyed) Smythe's Megalith, and the Coffin Stone, which may be a part of a fourth. Three other examples, the Coldrum Long Barrow, Addington Long Barrow, and Chestnuts Long Barrow, remain on the western side of the river. Excavation has revealed the existence of an Early Neolithic longhouse near to the stone.

By the 19th century, antiquarians were speculating that the Lower White Horse Stone may have taken its name from the White Horse of Kent, which they in turn believed was the flag of the legendary fifth-century Anglo-Saxon warriors Hengest and Horsa. Subsequent historical research has not accepted this interpretation. After the stone was destroyed, the stories associated with it were transposed to a nearby sarsen boulder, which became known as the Upper White Horse Stone. Since at least the 1980s, the latter has been viewed as a sacred site by various Folkish Heathen groups, including the Odinic Rite, because of its folkloric associations with Hengest and Horsa and the Anglo-Saxon Migration. As well as performing rituals there, they have opposed vandalism of the stone and campaigned to stop development in the vicinity.

== Context ==
The Early Neolithic was a revolutionary period of British history. Between 4500 and 3800 BC, it saw a widespread change in lifestyle as the communities living in the British Isles adopted agriculture as their primary form of subsistence, abandoning the hunter-gatherer lifestyle that had characterised the preceding Mesolithic period. This came about through contact with continental European societies, although it is unclear to what extent this can be attributed to an influx of migrants or to indigenous Mesolithic Britons adopting agricultural technologies from the continent. The region of modern Kent would have been key for the arrival of continental settlers and visitors, because of its position on the estuary of the River Thames and its proximity to the continent.

Britain was then largely forested; widespread forest clearance did not occur in Kent until the Late Bronze Age (c.1000 to 700 BC). Environmental data from the vicinity of the White Horse Stone supports the idea that the area was still largely forested in the Early Neolithic, covered by a woodland of oak, ash, hazel/alder and Amygdaloideae. Throughout most of Britain, there is little evidence of cereal or permanent dwellings from this period, leading archaeologists to believe that the island's Early Neolithic economy was largely pastoral, relying on herding cattle, with people living a nomadic or semi-nomadic life.

=== Medway Megaliths ===
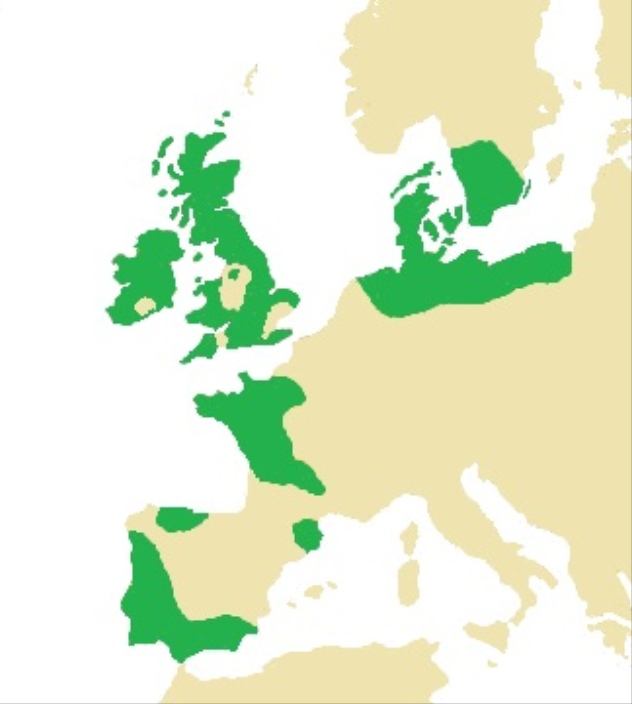
The construction of long barrows and related funerary monuments took place in various parts of Europe during the Early Neolithic (distribution pictured)

Across Western Europe, the Early Neolithic marks the first period in which humans built monumental structures in the landscape. These constructs include chambered long barrows, rectangular or oval earthen tumuli which had a chamber built into one end. Some of these chambers were constructed from timber, although others were built using large stones, now known as "megaliths". The long barrows often served as tombs, housing the physical remains of the dead within their chamber. Individuals were rarely buried alone in the Early Neolithic, instead being interred in collective burials with other members of their community. These chambered tombs were built all along the Western European seaboard during the Early Neolithic, from southeastern Spain up to southern Sweden, taking in most of the British Isles; the architectural tradition was introduced to Britain from continental Europe in the first half of the fourth millennium BC. Although there are stone buildings—like Göbekli Tepe in modern Turkey—that predate them, the chambered long barrows constitute humanity's first widespread tradition of construction using stone.

Although now all ruined and not retaining their original appearance, at the time of construction the Medway Megaliths would have been some of the largest and most visually imposing Early Neolithic funerary monuments in Britain. Grouped along the River Medway as it cuts through the North Downs, they constitute the most southeasterly group of megalithic monuments in the British Isles, and the only megalithic group in eastern England. The archaeologists Brian Philp and Mike Dutto deemed the Medway Megaliths to be "some of the most interesting and well known" archaeological sites in Kent, while the archaeologist Paul Ashbee described them as "the most grandiose and impressive structures of their kind in southern England".

The megaliths can be divided into two separate clusters: one to the west of the River Medway and the other on Blue Bell Hill to the east, with a distance between the two clusters of between 8 and 10 kilometres (5 and 6 mi). The western group includes Coldrum Long Barrow, Addington Long Barrow, and the Chestnuts Long Barrow. The eastern group consists of Smythe's Megalith, Kit's Coty House, and Little Kit's Coty House, while various stones on the eastern side of the river, most notably the Coffin Stone and White Horse Stone, may also have been parts of such structures. It is not known if they were all built at the same time, or whether they were constructed in succession, while similarly it is not known if they each served the same function or whether there was a hierarchy in their usage.

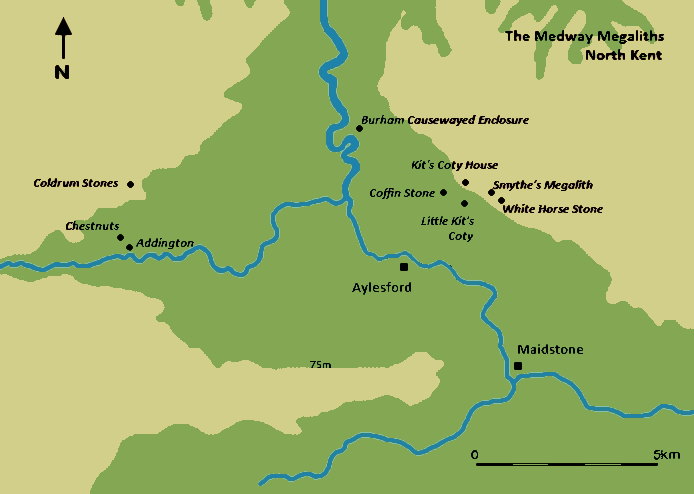
Map of the Medway Megaliths around the River Medway

The Medway long barrows all conformed to the same general design plan, and are all aligned on an east to west axis. Each had a stone chamber at the eastern end of the mound, and they each probably had a stone facade flanking the entrance. They had internal heights of up to 3.0 metres (10 feet), making them taller than most other chambered long barrows in Britain. The chambers were constructed from sarsen, a dense, hard, and durable stone that occurs naturally throughout Kent, having formed out of sand from the Eocene epoch. Early Neolithic builders would have selected blocks from the local area, and then transported them to the site of the monument to be erected.

These common architectural features among the Medway Megaliths indicate a strong regional cohesion with no direct parallels elsewhere in the British Isles. Nevertheless, as with other regional groupings of Early Neolithic long barrows—such as the Cotswold-Severn group in south-western Britain—there are also various idiosyncrasies in the different monuments, such as Coldrum's rectilinear shape, the Chestnut Long Barrow's facade, and the long, thin mounds at Addington and Kit's Coty. These variations might have been caused by the tombs being altered and adapted over the course of their use; in this scenario, the monuments would be composite structures.

The builders were probably influenced by pre-existing tomb-shrines. Whether those people had grown up locally, or moved into the Medway area from elsewhere, is not known. Based on a stylistic analysis of their architectural designs, the archaeologist Stuart Piggott thought that the plan behind the Medway Megaliths had originated in the area around the Low Countries; conversely, Glyn Daniel thought their design derived from Scandinavia, John H. Evans thought Germany, and Ronald F. Jessup suggested an influence from the Cotswold-Severn group. Ashbee noted that their close clustering in the same area was reminiscent of the megalithic tomb-shrine traditions of continental Northern Europe, and emphasised that the megaliths were a regional manifestation of a tradition widespread across Early Neolithic Europe. He nevertheless stressed that a precise place of origin was "impossible to indicate" with the available evidence.

== Features ==
=== Lower White Horse Stone ===
The Lower White Horse Stone once stood about 300 metres (980 ft) west of Upper White Horse Stone. It was located to the north-west of where the Pilgrims' Way bisected the Rochester-to-Maidstone road, with the latter now being the A229 dual carriageway. Philp and Dutto thought that the site of the Lower White Horse Stone was probably under the A229. Evans called this the "Original White Horse Stone", but noted that it was sometimes known as "The Kentish Standard Stone". Apparently also made from sarsen, the stone was broken up prior to 1834. It is possible that the Lower White Horse Stone was part of a former chambered long barrow, although Philp and Dutto noted that any such link was "uncertain".

=== Upper White Horse Stone ===
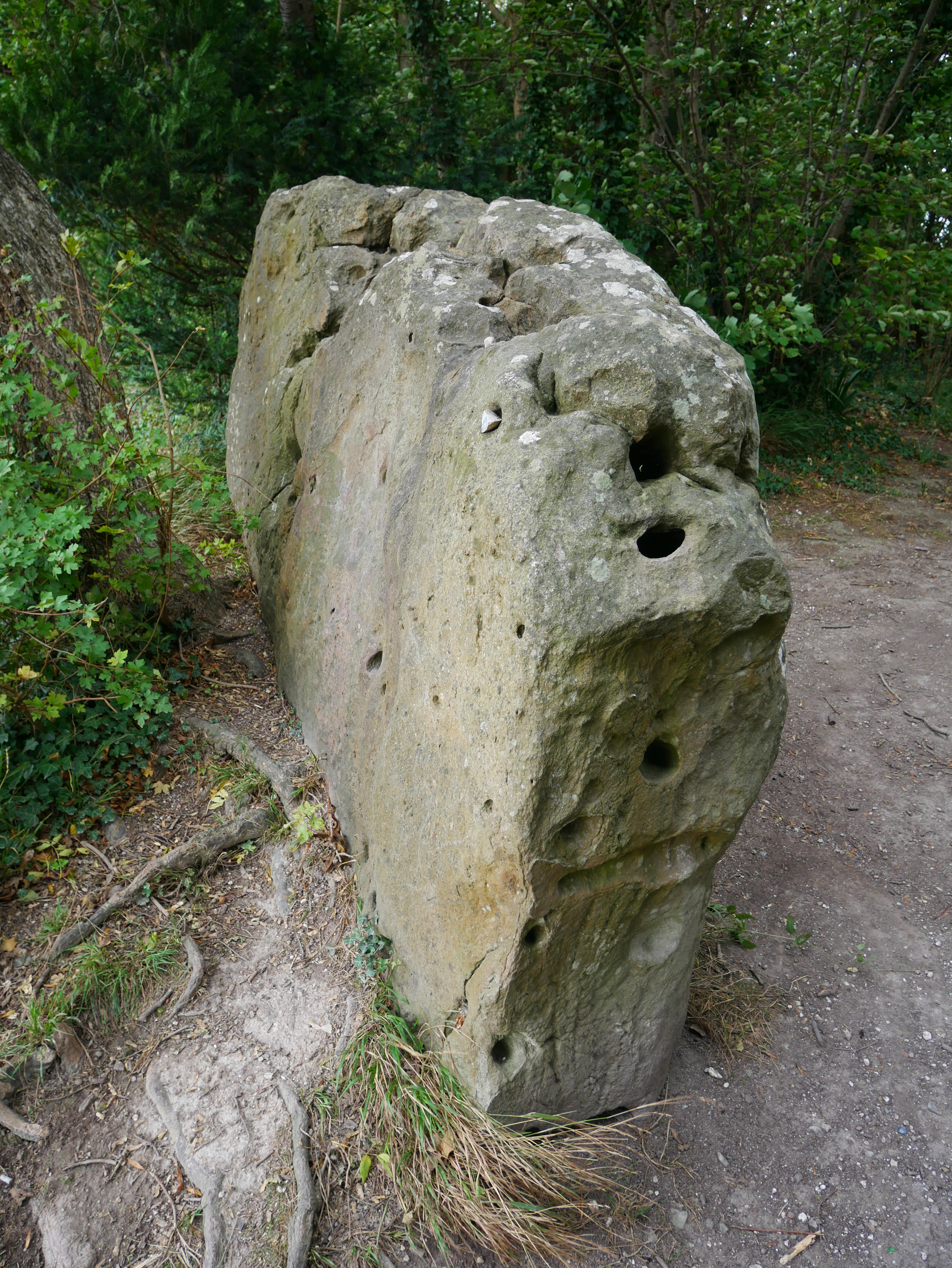
View of the White Horse Stone from the northwest

The Upper White Horse Stone (grid reference TQ753603) is 2.9 metres (9.5 ft) in length, 1.65 metres (5.4 ft) in height, and about 0.6 metres (2.0 ft) thick. It is sarsen. The White Horse Stone is situated in "a narrow strip of woodland", known as Westfield Wood, which is adjacent to the Pilgrim's Way. The megalith lies to the east of the A229 dual carriageway, and can be reached by going behind the nearby petrol garage and following the Pilgrim's Way.

The Upper White Horse Stone took its name from the destroyed Lower White Horse Stone; that it had taken on this name was first noted in print in 1927. Reflecting this, Evans called it the "Successor White Horse Stone". He believed that at one end it had the "crude outline of a face caused by the natural configuration of the rock". It is scheduled under the Ancient Monuments and Archaeological Areas Act 1979.

It is possible that the Upper White Horse Stone was once part of a chambered long barrow that has otherwise been destroyed. Philp and Dutto, however, noted that its identification as part of a long barrow was "uncertain". In supporting this possibility, Evans noted that upright stone resembled a "chamber wallstone" akin to those at Coldrum and Kit's Coty House. However, there is no visual trace of any earthen mound having existed next to the monolith. Nine smaller stones extend westward from the White Horse Stone for about ten metres. It is possible that these stones were not placed there in the Early Neolithic but were moved there at a later date by local farmers who found them in their fields.

=== Nearby Neolithic features ===
The White Horse Stone is located near to where another chambered long barrow, Smythe's Megalith, was found in 1822. This chamber was found to contain broken pieces of human bone, among them parts of a skull, ribs, thigh, leg, and arm bones. After being discovered buried in a field by farm labourers, the chamber of this long barrow was destroyed, meaning that nothing of this monument can now be seen. Various sarsen stones have been found in the vicinity of both Smythe's Megalith and the White Horse Stone, perhaps reflecting the remnants of since-destroyed long barrows.

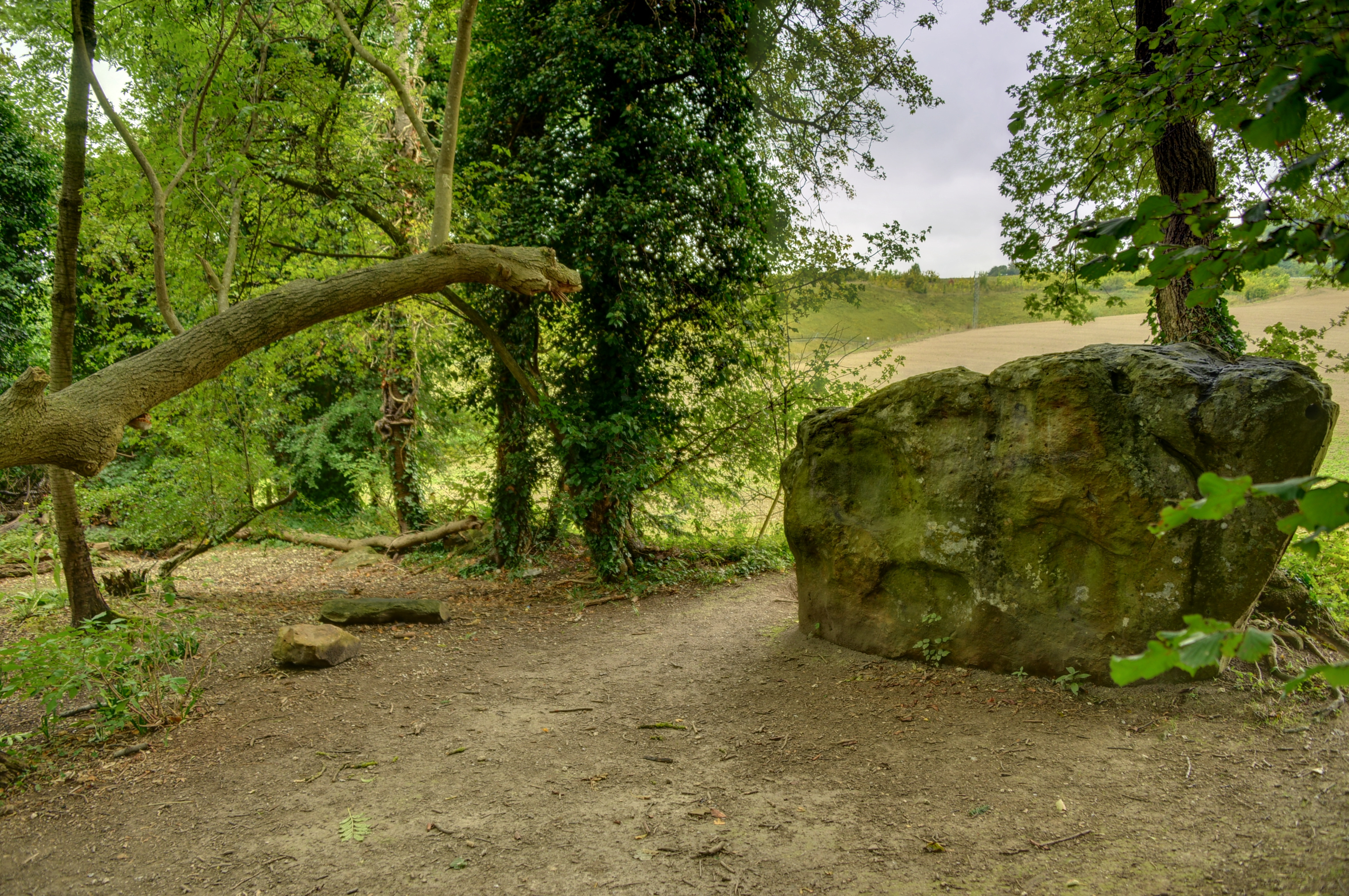
The White Horse Stone located in a small stretch of woodland

To the south of the White Horse Stone was a building—termed "Structure 4806" by its excavators in the 2000s—that was constructed in the Early Neolithic period. Radiocarbon dating from the site suggests a usage date of between 4110-3820 and 3780-3530 calibrated BC. 18 metres (59 ft) long and 8 metres (26 ft) wide, it was a longhouse of a type known from across various parts of Europe. If it had been a domestic residence, its size would mean that it was only "occupied by a small number of occupants, probably no more than a small family group". A smaller, circular building approximately 3.75 metres (12 ft) in diameter was present just to the south-east of the longhouse; there was little dating evidence for this, but what existed suggested a Late Neolithic origin.

The archaeologist Timothy Champion noted that the presence of these structures does "not fit well" with the broader evidence for Early Neolithic life being "still partly mobile" but that this would be explained if the buildings were not residential. He suggested that the longhouse "had a role that was more communal and ceremonial than purely residential and domestic, though such a stark division may not have made sense in the Neolithic". The archaeologists who excavated these buildings suggested that they might have been "houses of the living" that were intervisible with the "houses of the dead", including Smythe's Megalith. Alternately, they suggested that the longhouse could have been "part of the funerary tradition", used in preparing "the remains of the dead or for communal activities such as feasting".

== Later history ==
Around 200 metres (660 ft) away from the Neolithic houses, a settlement was established on a spur of higher ground during the Late Bronze Age and Iron Age. This included several round houses and deep pits cut into the underlying chalk. These pits were perhaps originally used for corn storage, although were later infilled with ceramics, iron objects, animal bone, and two human burials. The archaeologists who investigated the site believed that this material was not just domestic refuse but had been deposited with greater meaning as part of a ritual act.

=== Antiquarianism and folklore ===
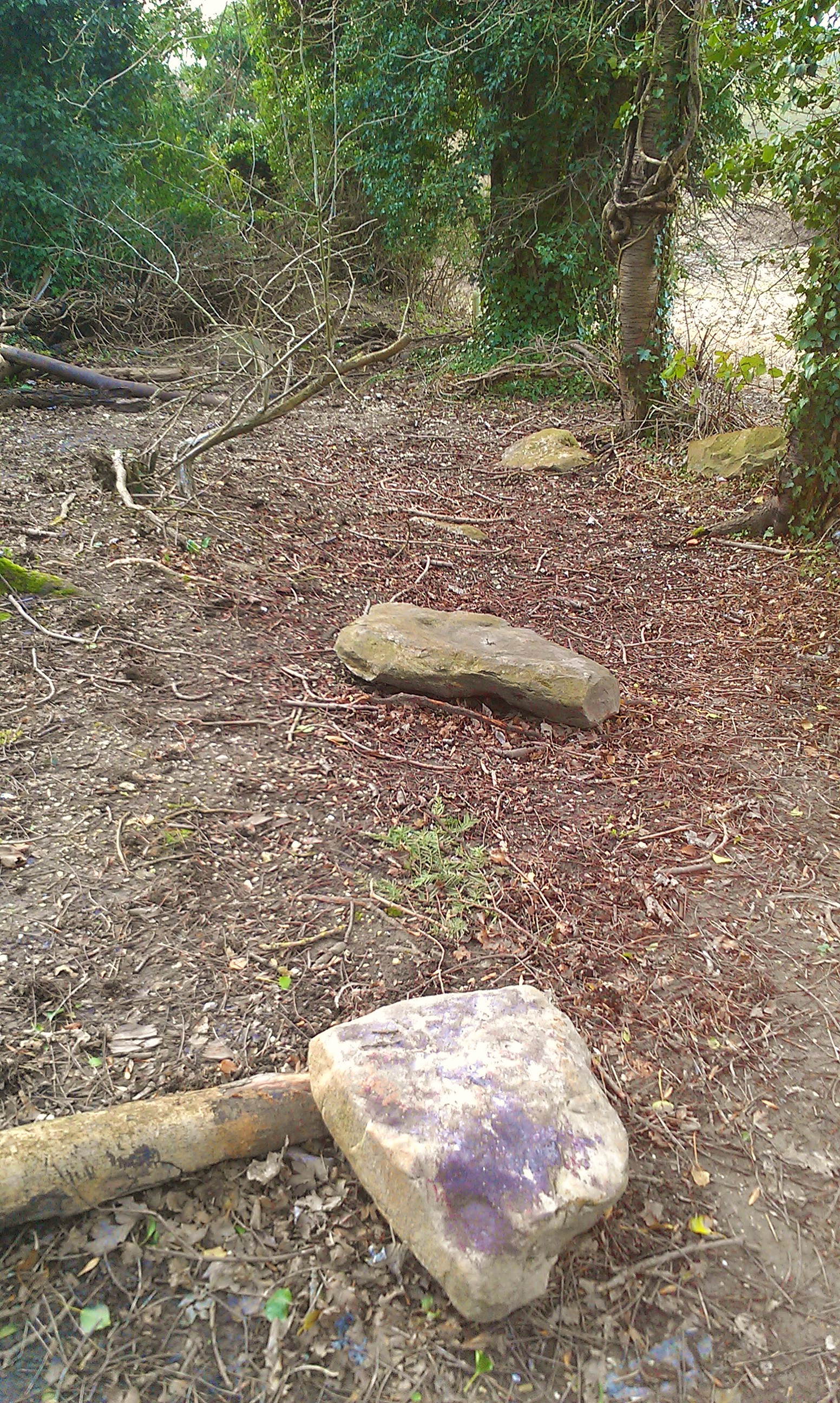
Some of the nine smaller stones that stretch to the west of the monument

In his 1834 book A Brief Historical and Descriptive Account of Maidstone and its Environs, the antiquarian S. C. Lampreys noted that the "White Horse Stone"—meaning the Lower White Horse Stone—had been "broken into pieces and thrown into the road". Lampreys also described the site where the stone "lay", with Ashbee suggesting that this indicated it had lain prone prior to being destroyed.

Lampreys noted that it was a "tradition" that after the legendary fifth-century invaders Hengest and Horsa battled Vortimer and Catigern, their battle standard—which featured a white horse—was found at the stone. Lampreys did not express a view as to whether this tale was "true or false". Lampreys was the first to include the link between the stone and Hengest and Horsa in published form, with Ashbee later noting that "its continuance stems from this source". Ashbee suggested that the story could have been linked to the stone as a result of the antiquarian William Lambarde's 16th century enthusiasm for the Anglo-Saxon past, but ultimately considered this unlikely given that—as argued by Ronald Jessup—the motif of the white horse of Kent only arose later, in the 17th century. Jessup was openly critical of the link, stating that "stories of the god-like White Horse of Kent attached to [the stone] are quite without foundation", going on to describe such connections as "nonsense".

In 1842, Douglas Allport included a woodcut of the Lower White Horse Stone in his book on the nearby town of Maidstone. In the mid-1840s, the antiquarian Beale Post discussed the White Horse Stone among other antiquities in the local area in an unpublished manuscript. He provided four possible explanations of the name's derivation: that after the Battle of Aylesford, the White Horse banner of the Saxons fell upon the stone; that when the sun hits in a certain direction it casts a shadow which looks like a horse; that the Iron Age druids sacrificed a white horse on it; and that someone riding a white horse was killed near it. In that same manuscript, Post provided a sketch of the Lower White Horse Stone.

In his 1924 publication dealing with Kent, the archaeologist O. G. S. Crawford, then working as the archaeological officer for the Ordnance Survey, listed the Upper White Horse Stone alongside the other Medway Megaliths. William Coles Finch then discussed the site in his 1927 work, In Kentish Pilgrimland, its Ancient Roads and Shrines, including a photograph of it; at this point it was in the open air rather than being found in a patch of woodland. In 1970, the archaeologist R. F. Jessup published an account of the stone alongside another photo, indicating that by this time trees had grown up around it.

The folklorists Fran and Geoff Doel suggested that the White Horse Stone might have been the feature referred to as a "Druid Stone" in a nineteenth-century account of a ghost dog. This account was produced by a vicar who stated that while he and a friend were returning to Burham from a visit to Boxley Church, they found themselves being pursued by "a lean grey dog with upstanding ears[… which] appeared as big as a calf." The vicar related that the creature then pursued them to the "Druid Stone".

== Modern Paganism ==
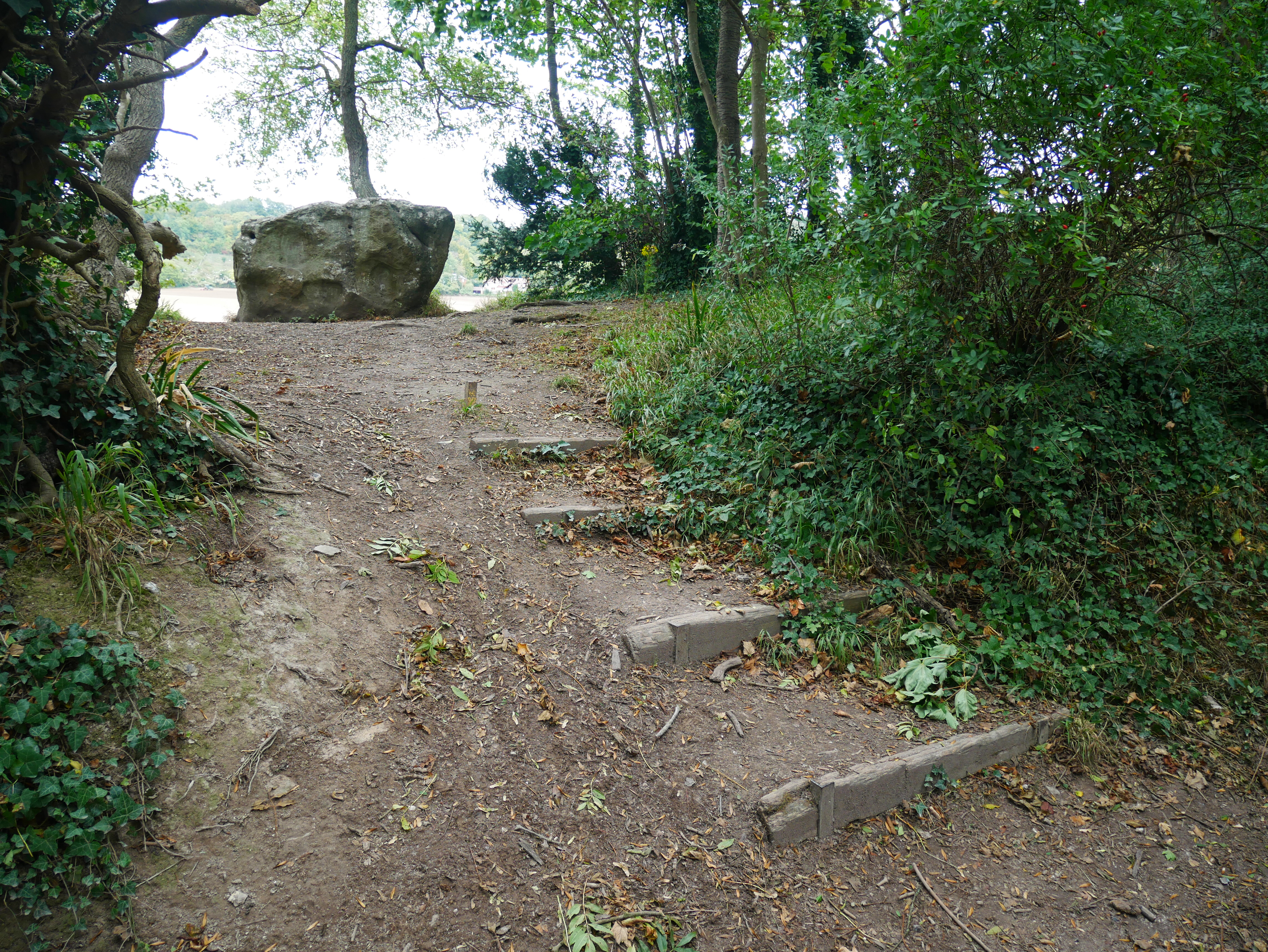
The steps leading from the Pilgrim's Way up to the Stone

The White Horse Stone has come to be seen as a sacred site by folkish Heathens that place a focus on an essentialist understanding of race. One folkish Heathen group, the Odinic Rite, was founded in 1973; its co-founder John Yeowell adopted the White Horse Stone as "the birth place of England" and held a blót ceremony there to "reclaim and make holy" the megalith. The group emphasise the idea of English ancestry at the site, regarding it as "the symbolic birthplace of the English nation", and a "symbolic site for the remembrance of Hengest and Horsa and the coming to these lands of our faith". Unlike other Pagans who perform rituals at the Medway Megaliths, such as a modern Druidic group, these folkish Heathens understand "ancestors" not as people who inhabited the same landscape in the past, but as people to whom they are related by blood.

Some members of the Odinic Rite share the view of other modern Pagans that the White Horse Stone and other Medway Megaliths are connected to "earth energies" that pre-modern peoples were more "in tune with" than their contemporary counterparts. Since 1987, the Odinic Rite has performed rituals at the site, usually on a monthly basis, although also for rites of passage like handfasting weddings, commitments to the group, and funerary ceremonies. In accordance with his wishes, in 2010 Yeowell had his cremated ashes scattered at the stone following a funeral at the West London Crematorium in Kensal Green.

In 1987, members of the Odinic Rite formed the Guardians of the White Horse Stone, a group devoted to protecting the site; they installed timber steps from the Pilgrim's Way enabling visitors better access to it. In the 1990s, they unsuccessfully campaigned to stop the Channel Tunnel Rail Link from being tunnelled close to the Stone. The Guardians group fell dormant, although was revived in 2004 to deal with a new situation; in 2003, the telecommunications company Orange sought planning permission to build a radio tower within a few metres of the stone. The Odinic Rite, in tandem with another folkish Heathen group called Woden's Folk, (Note: In August 2019, Woden's Folk—which adheres to neo-Nazism—attracted press attention amid concerns regarding its ritual use of prehistoric sites like Avebury in Wiltshire and Wayland's Smithy in Oxfordshire.) successfully petitioned Tonbridge and Malling Council to reject the proposal. In 2006, Orange revived their application, although this time proposed to move the tower further from the White Horse Stone. The Guardians again campaigned against this. The White Horse Stone has also been vandalised on various occasions, with visitors having drawn and painted on it. Members of the Odinic Rite have endeavoured to remove this graffiti using methods they believe are not harmful to the stone.

== See also ==
- List of scheduled monuments in Maidstone
- Coronation Stone, Kingston upon Thames
