= Chestnuts Long Barrow =

Chambered long barrow in Kent, England

Chestnuts Long Barrow Stony or Long Warren
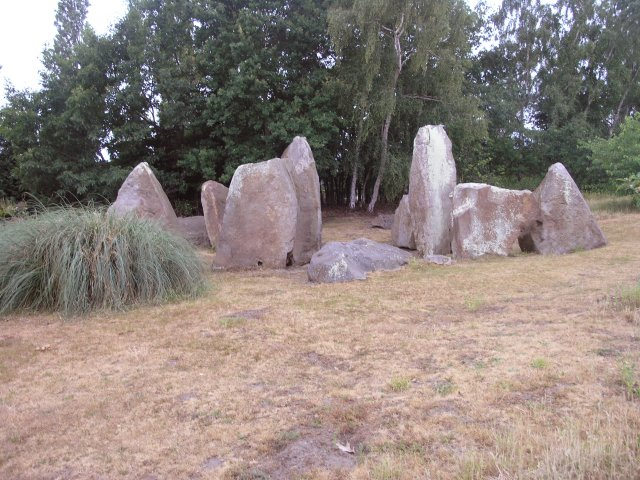
- The sarsen megaliths that were once part of the chamber of the long barrow

- Location within Kent
- Location: Addington, Kent; United Kingdom
- Coordinates: 51°18′27.6″N 0°22′10.4″E
- Type: Long barrow
- Owner: Rose Alba

Chestnuts Long Barrow, also known as Stony Warren or Long Warren, is a chambered long barrow near the village of Addington in the south-eastern English county of Kent. Probably constructed in the fifth millennium BC, during Britain's Early Neolithic period, today it survives only in a ruined state.

Archaeologists have established that long barrows were built by pastoralist communities shortly after the introduction of agriculture to Britain from continental Europe. Representing an architectural tradition of long barrow building that was widespread across Neolithic Europe, Chestnuts Long Barrow belongs to a localised regional style of barrows produced in the vicinity of the River Medway. The long barrows built in this area are now known as the Medway Megaliths. Chestnuts Long Barrow lies near to both Addington Long Barrow and Coldrum Long Barrow on the western side of the river. Two further surviving long barrows, Kit's Coty House and Little Kit's Coty House, as well as the destroyed Smythe's Megalith and possible survivals as the Coffin Stone and White Horse Stone, are on the eastern side of the Medway.

The long barrow was built on land previously inhabited in the Mesolithic period. It consisted of a sub-rectangular earthen tumulus, estimated to have been 15 metres (50 feet) in length, with a chamber built from sarsen megaliths on its eastern end. Both inhumed and cremated human remains were placed within this chamber during the Neolithic period, representing at least nine or ten individuals. These remains were found alongside pottery sherds, stone arrow heads, and a clay pendant. In the 4th century AD, a Romano-British hut was erected next to the long barrow. In the 12th or 13th century, the chamber was dug into and heavily damaged, either by treasure hunters or iconoclastic Christians. The mound gradually eroded and was completely gone by the twentieth century, leaving only the ruined stone chamber. The ruin attracted the interest of antiquarians in the 18th and 19th centuries, while archaeological excavation took place in 1957, followed by limited reconstruction. The site is on privately owned land.

== Name and location ==
Chestnuts Long Barrow is a scheduled ancient monument, standing on private land belonging to a neighbouring house, Rose Alba. It lies on the slope of a hill and borrows its name from the Chestnuts, an area of woodland that crowns the hill. This name was given to the monument in the mid-20th century; it had previously been known as Stony Warren or Long Warren. The barrow is in the greensand belt, 30 metres (100 feet) above sea level. The underlying geology is a soft sandstone covered with a stratum of white sand.

== Background ==
The Early Neolithic was a revolutionary period of British history. Between 4500 and 3800 BC, it saw a widespread change in lifestyle as the communities living in the British Isles adopted agriculture as their primary form of subsistence, abandoning the hunter-gatherer lifestyle that had characterised the preceding Mesolithic period. The change came about through contact with continental European societies, although it is unclear to what extent this can be attributed to an influx of migrants or to indigenous Mesolithic Britons adopting agricultural technologies from the continent. The region of modern Kent would have been key for the arrival of continental European settlers and visitors, because of its position on the estuary of the River Thames and its proximity to the continent.

Britain was then largely forested; widespread forest clearance did not occur in Kent until the Late Bronze Age (c. 1000 to 700 BC). Environmental data from the vicinity of the White Horse Stone, a putatively prehistoric monolith near the River Medway, supports the idea that the area was still largely forested in the Early Neolithic, covered by a woodland of oak, ash, hazel/alder and Amygdaloideae (stone-fruit trees). Throughout most of Britain, there is little evidence of cereal or permanent dwellings from this period, leading archaeologists to believe that the island's Early Neolithic economy was largely pastoral, relying on herding cattle, with people living a nomadic or semi-nomadic life.

=== Medway Megaliths ===
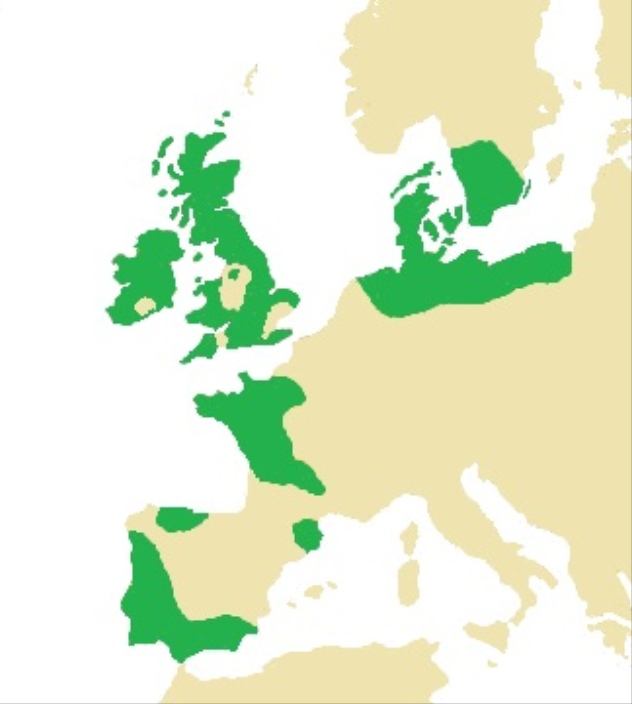
The construction of long barrows and related funerary monuments took place in various parts of Europe during the Early Neolithic (known distribution pictured)

Across Western Europe, the Early Neolithic marked the first period in which humans built monumental structures in the landscape. These structures included chambered long barrows, rectangular or oval earthen tumuli that had a chamber built into one end. Some of these chambers were constructed out of timber, while others were built using large stones, now known as "megaliths". These long barrows often served as tombs, housing the physical remains of the dead within their chamber. Individuals were rarely buried alone in the Early Neolithic, instead being interred in collective burials with other members of their community. These chambered tombs were built all along the Western European seaboard during the Early Neolithic, from southeastern Spain up to southern Sweden, taking in most of the British Isles; the architectural tradition was introduced to Britain from continental Europe in the first half of the fourth millennium BC.

Although now all in a ruinous state, at the time of construction the Medway Megaliths would have been some of the largest and most visually imposing Early Neolithic funerary monuments in Britain. Grouped along the River Medway as it cuts through the North Downs, they constitute the most southeasterly group of megalithic monuments in the British Isles, and the only megalithic group in eastern England. The Medway Megaliths can be divided into two clusters between 8 kilometres (5.0 miles) and 10 kilometres (6.2 miles) apart: one to the west of the River Medway and the other on Blue Bell Hill to the east. Chestnuts Long Barrow is part of the western group, which also includes Coldrum Long Barrow and Addington Long Barrow. The eastern group consists of Smythe's Megalith, Kit's Coty House, and Little Kit's Coty House, while various stones on the eastern side of the river, most notably the Coffin Stone and White Horse Stone, may also have been parts of such structures. It is not known if they were all built at the same time, or whether they were constructed in succession; nor is it known if they each served the same function or whether there was a hierarchy in their usage.

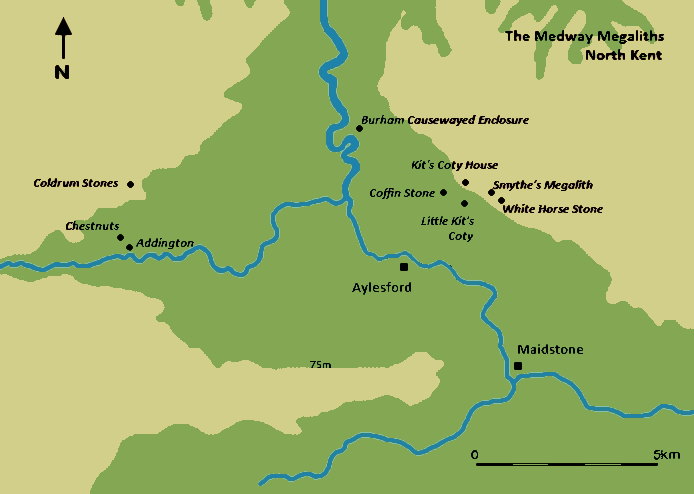
Map of the Medway Megaliths around the River Medway

The Medway long barrows all conformed to the same general design plan, and are all aligned on an east to west axis. Each had a stone chamber at the eastern end of the mound, and they each probably had a stone facade flanking the entrance. They had internal heights of up to 3.0 metres (10 feet), making them taller than most other chambered long barrows in Britain. The chambers were constructed from sarsen, a dense, hard, and durable stone that occurs naturally throughout Kent, having formed out of sand from the Eocene epoch. Early Neolithic builders would have selected blocks from the local area, and then transported them to the site of the monument to be erected.

These common architectural features among the Medway Megaliths indicate a strong regional cohesion with no direct parallels elsewhere in the British Isles. Nevertheless, as with other regional groupings of Early Neolithic long barrows—such as the Cotswold-Severn group in south-western Britain—there are also various idiosyncrasies in the different monuments, such as Coldrum's rectilinear shape, the Chestnut Long Barrow's facade, and the long, thin mounds at Addington and Kit's Coty. These variations might have been caused by the tombs being altered and adapted over the course of their use; in this scenario, the monuments would be composite structures.

The Medway Megaliths' builders were probably influenced by pre-existing tomb-shrines elsewhere that they were aware of. Whether the builders had grown up locally, or moved into the Medway area from elsewhere is not known. Based on a stylistic analysis of their architectural designs, the archaeologist Stuart Piggott thought that the plan behind the Medway Megaliths had originated in the area around the Low Countries, while fellow archaeologist Glyn Daniel instead believed that the same evidence showed an influence from Scandinavia. John H. Evans instead suggested an origin in Germany, and Ronald F. Jessup thought that their origins could be seen in the Cotswold-Severn megalithic group. Alexander thought that they bore closest similarities with long barrows along the Atlantic coast, perhaps imitating those of either Ireland or Brittany. The archaeologist Paul Ashbee noted that their close clustering in the same area was reminiscent of the megalithic tomb-shrine traditions of continental Northern Europe, and emphasised that the Medway Megaliths were a regional manifestation of a tradition widespread across Early Neolithic Europe. He nevertheless stressed that a precise place of origin was "impossible to indicate" with the available evidence.

== Design and construction ==
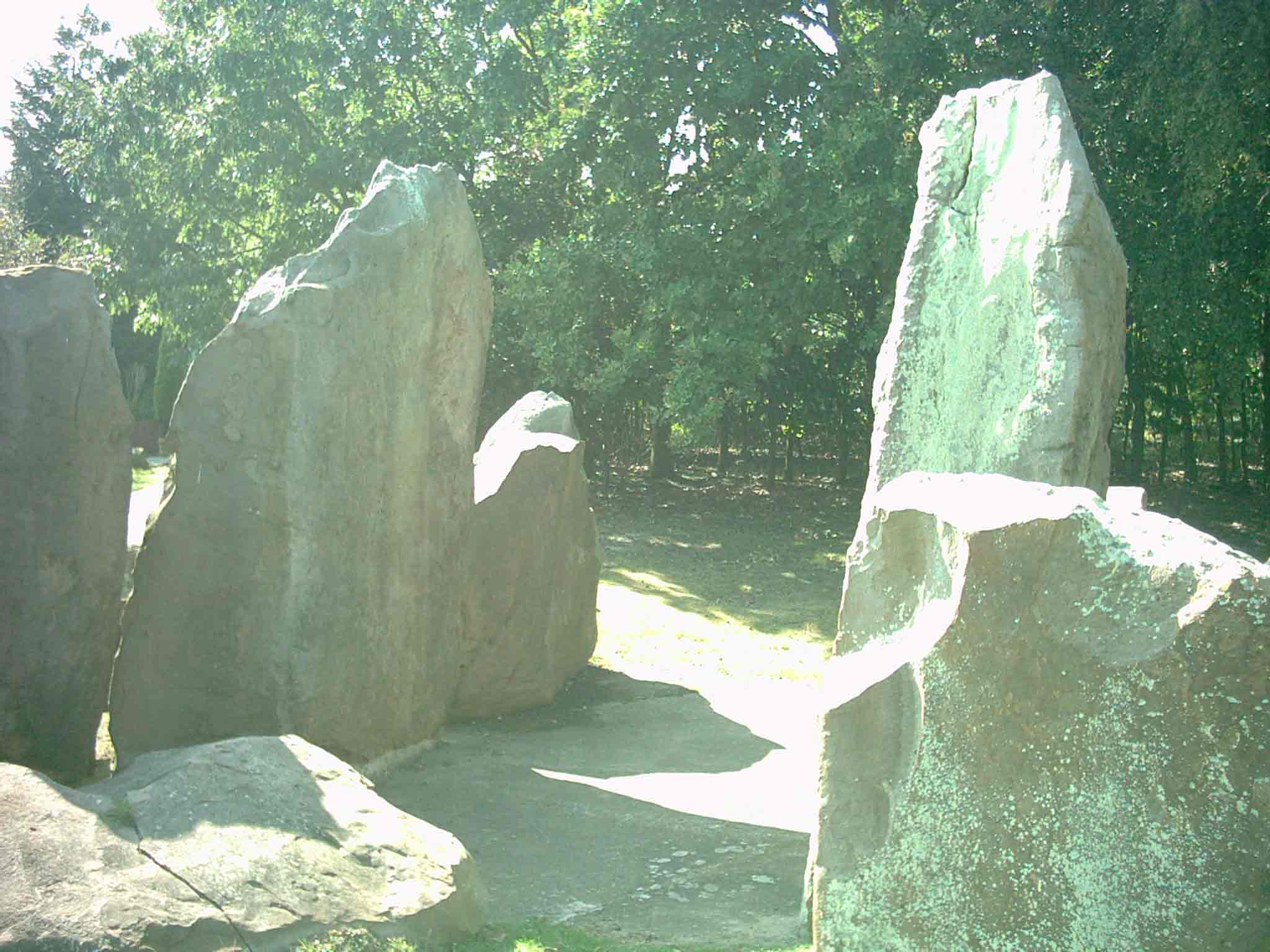
View looking west across the burial chamber with the facade stones visible on either side

Archaeological excavation revealed a Mesolithic layer below the monument, evidenced by much debris produced by flint knapping. During the 1957 excavation of the site, 2,300 Mesolithic flint fragments were found beneath it. Many more have been discovered in test trenches around the area, stretching up the hill towards Chestnuts Wood and for at least 180 metres (200 yards) east of the tomb and 370 metres (400 yards) south-west of it. Around 30 metres (100 feet) west of the long barrow, excavation revealed flints in association with what was interpreted as a Mesolithic hearth. The large quantities of Mesolithic material, coupled with its broad spread, indicated that the site was probably inhabited over a considerable length of time during the Mesolithic period. Some trenches excavated in 1957 had Mesolithic flints directly below the megaliths, leading the excavator John Alexander to believe that "no great interval of time separated" the Mesolithic and Neolithic uses of the site.

Chestnuts Long Barrow was constructed in particularly close proximity to Addington Long Barrow. The chamber was built with sarsen stones that occur naturally within a few miles of the site. These were arranged as two trilithons, next to each other, so that the two lintel stones formed the roof of the chamber. The chamber was trapezoidal in shape, measuring about 3.7 metres (12 feet) in length, 2.29 metres (7 feet 6 inches) in width, and probably 3.0 metres (10 feet) in height. It was oriented almost east to west, and as with four other Medway Megaliths, it appears to have been facing toward either the Medway Valley or the North Downs. It is probable that the chamber's entrance was almost entirely blocked by a large stone. While it is difficult to determine the chamber's precise original layout due to damage caused in the medieval period, it is probable that a medial stone divided the chamber in two. A dry stone wall across the west end of the chamber would have also blocked access.

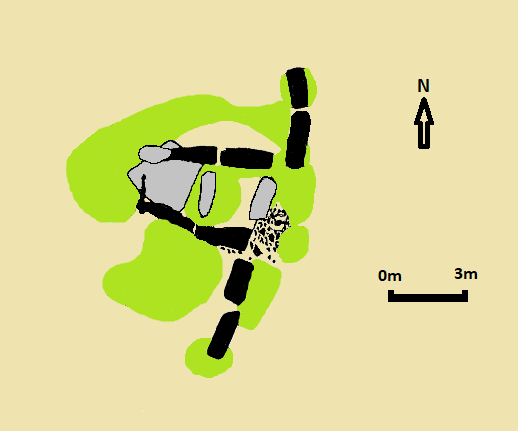
Plan of the long barrow's chamber based on that provided by the excavator John Alexander; black stones were those that had been pulled vertical but still stood in their original position; grey stones are those of unclear original position; the green areas mark robber trenches made in the Middle Ages.

Alexander suggested that the earthen mound was constructed before the chamber, and that it was used as a ramp on which to drag the large stones into position. He suggested that the long barrow's builders kept the megaliths in place by filling the chamber with sand. Once the capstone was placed atop and the chamber was stable, he thought, the builders would have removed the supporting sand. In 1950, it was stated that 14 stones survived, however full excavation revealed that 18 large sarsen boulders were extant, alongside four smaller sarsen stones used in the dry stone wall and pavement of the tomb.

The chamber had a pavement set in yellow sand, onto which human remains were placed. These human remains were evidenced by the discovery of 3,500 pieces of bone, reflecting a minimum of nine or ten individuals, at least one of whom was a child. Some of these burials were inhumed, and others were cremated, while the earlier bones were deposited alongside Windmill Hill pottery. Little evidence of inhumed burials was found, in part because they did not survive well in the acidic soils surrounding the site. The appearance of cremated human bone here is unusual; although evidence of cremation has been found at some other long barrows, generally it is rare in Early Neolithic Britain. Ashbee suggested that for this reason, the inclusion of cremated bone here must have had "especial significance".

While acknowledging that there was evidence of Early Neolithic cremation at certain sites in Britain, the archaeologists Martin Smith and Megan Brickley suggested that the cremated bone was added later, during the Late Neolithic, when cremation was more common. Along with the human remains were found items probably interred with the dead, such as 34 sherds of ceramic, three stone arrow heads, and a clay pendant. In the forecourt of the site, excavators found 100 sherds of Windmill Hill ware, representing parts of at least eight bowls. Alexander suggested that these were once placed in the chamber but later removed to allow the deposition of further human remains inside it.

Although no visible tumulus survived into the 1950s, the name "Long Warren" suggested that knowledge of such a mound had persisted into the 18th century. Excavation found evidence of the northern and eastern edges of the barrow, but all trace of its western and southern ends had been destroyed by levelling and deep ploughing. The barrow was probably trapezoidal or D-shaped, with a width of about 18 metres (60 feet). At its widest, opposite the façade, this may have extended to 20 metres (64 feet). It was more difficult to determine the long barrow's length, although Alexander suggested that it may have been about 15 metres (50 feet).

=== Meaning and purpose ===
Britain's Early Neolithic communities placed greater emphasis on the ritual burial of the dead than their Mesolithic forebears. Archaeologists have suggested that this is because Early Neolithic Britons adhered to an ancestor cult that venerated the spirits of the dead, believing that they could intercede with the forces of nature for the benefit of their living descendants. The archaeologist Robin Holgate stressed that rather than simply being tombs, the Medway Megaliths were "communal monuments fulfilling a social function for the communities who built and used them". Thus, it has been suggested that Early Neolithic people entered into the tombs—which doubled as temples or shrines—to perform rituals honouring the dead and requesting their assistance. For this reason, the historian Ronald Hutton termed these monuments "tomb-shrines" to reflect their dual purpose.

In Britain, these tombs were typically located on prominent hills and slopes overlooking the landscape, perhaps at the junction between different territories. The archaeologist Caroline Malone noted that the tombs would have served as one of various landscape markers that conveyed information on "territory, political allegiance, ownership, and ancestors". Many archaeologists have subscribed to the idea that these tomb-shrines were territorial markers between different tribes; others have argued that such markers would be of little use to a nomadic herding society. Instead it has been suggested that they represent markers along herding pathways. The archaeologist Richard Bradley suggested that the construction of these monuments reflects an attempt to mark control and ownership over the land, thus reflecting a change in mindset brought about by the transition from the hunter-gatherer Mesolithic to the pastoralist Early Neolithic. Others have suggested that these monuments were built on sites already deemed sacred by Mesolithic hunter-gatherers.

== Later history ==
A photograph of the long barrow taken in the mid 1920s, prior to the site's reconstruction during the 1950s

During excavation of the site, four ceramic sherds were found nearby which the excavator believed were possibly Early Iron Age in origin. Excavation also revealed 830 ceramic sherds dating from Roman Britain; these reflected all four centuries of this period, although the majority were 4th century. Also dated to the 4th century was a hut erected on a flat area adjacent to the barrow. Excavation of this hut uncovered 750 ceramic sherds, charcoal, iron nails, burnt clay, bone, and flint fragments. Examining this assemblage of artefacts, the excavator noted that it was not typical of the item assemblages usually found at Romano-British settlement sites, implying that the building was a field shelter rather than a house.

Evidence for human activity near the barrow from the 11th through to the 13th century—during the Middle Ages—appeared in the form of 200 ceramic sherds, two hones, and 17 fragments of daub found by archaeologists in the topsoil. It was probably in this medieval period that the tomb was heavily destroyed, since medieval material was found in some of the pits created by those damaging the chamber and barrow. The destruction was carried out in a systematic manner. Initially, the barrow around the chamber was dug away, and an entrance into it was forced through the drystone wall at the north-western end. The chamber was then cleared down to the bedrock, with the spoil and contents of the chamber dumped behind the diggers. The medial stone of the chamber was pushed atop the spoil heap, and covered over with soil. A pit was dug in the centre of the chamber, and against its walls from the outside; the central pit was then sealed by the collapsing capstones. Finally, several pits were dug around the façade stones. Subsequently, the chamber collapsed, with several stones breaking on the impact of the fall. At some point after they had fallen, the inner pair of the chamber's tall stones were further damaged, likely in a process involving heating them with fire and then casting cold water onto them, resulting in breakage.

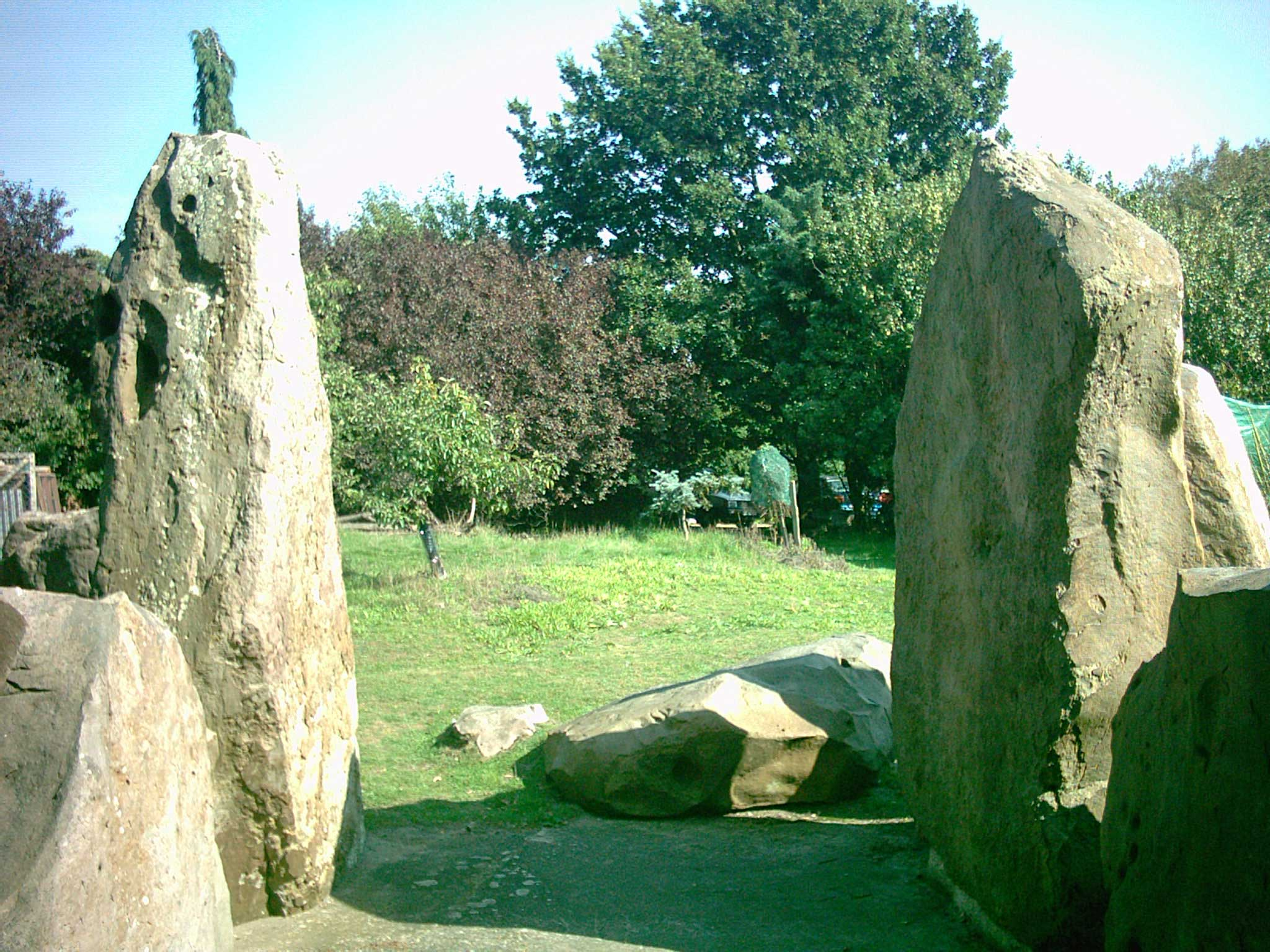
View looking east through the burial chamber of Chestnuts Long Barrow

From the available evidence, it was clear that this demolition was not carried out with the intent of collecting building stone nor for the clearance of ground for cultivation. Alexander believed the damage to the chamber was the result of robbery. Supporting this idea is comparative evidence, with the Close Roll of 1237 ordering the opening of barrows on the Isle of Wight in search for treasure, a practice which may have spread to Kent around the same time. Alexander believed that the destruction may have been brought about by a special commissioner, highlighting that the "expertness and thoroughness of the robbery" would have required more resources than a local community could muster. He further suggested that the individuals who damaged the monument might have also been responsible for the damage at Kit's Coty House, Coldrum Long Barrow, and Addington Long Barrow, while Ashbee suggested that the same could also be the case for Lower Kit's Coty House. Rather than robbery, Ashbee thought iconoclasm was the probable cause of the medieval damage to the chamber. He suggested that the burial of the stones indicated that Christian zealots had tried to deliberately destroy and defame the pre-Christian monument.

Excavation also revealed evidence for modern activity around the site. Three post-medieval pits were identified in and around the barrow, as well as a post-medieval attempt to dig into the chamber. Finds from this period included ceramic sherds, clay pipes dated from between the 17th and 19th centuries, stone and clay marbles, brick tile, and bottles dated from between the 18th and 20th centuries. Alexander suggested that this evidence confirmed local accounts that Chestnuts Long Barrow had been used as a popular spot for picnics. There are also accounts that it was used as a well-known rabbit warren; during the late 19th century, the field was used as a paddock.

== Folklore ==
In a 1946 paper published in the Folklore journal, John H. Evans recorded a Kentish folk belief which had been widespread "up to the last generation". This held that it was impossible to successfully count the number of stones in the Medway Megaliths. The countless stones motif is not unique to Kent, having been recorded at other megalithic monuments in Britain and Ireland. The earliest textual evidence for it is in an early 16th-century document, where it applies to Stonehenge in Wiltshire, although an early 17th-century document also applied it to The Hurlers, a set of three stone circles in Cornwall. Later records reveal that the folk story had gained widespread distribution in England and single occurrences in both Wales and Ireland. The folklorist S. P. Menefee suggested that it could be attributed to an animistic understanding that these megaliths had lives of their own.

== Antiquarian and archaeological investigation ==
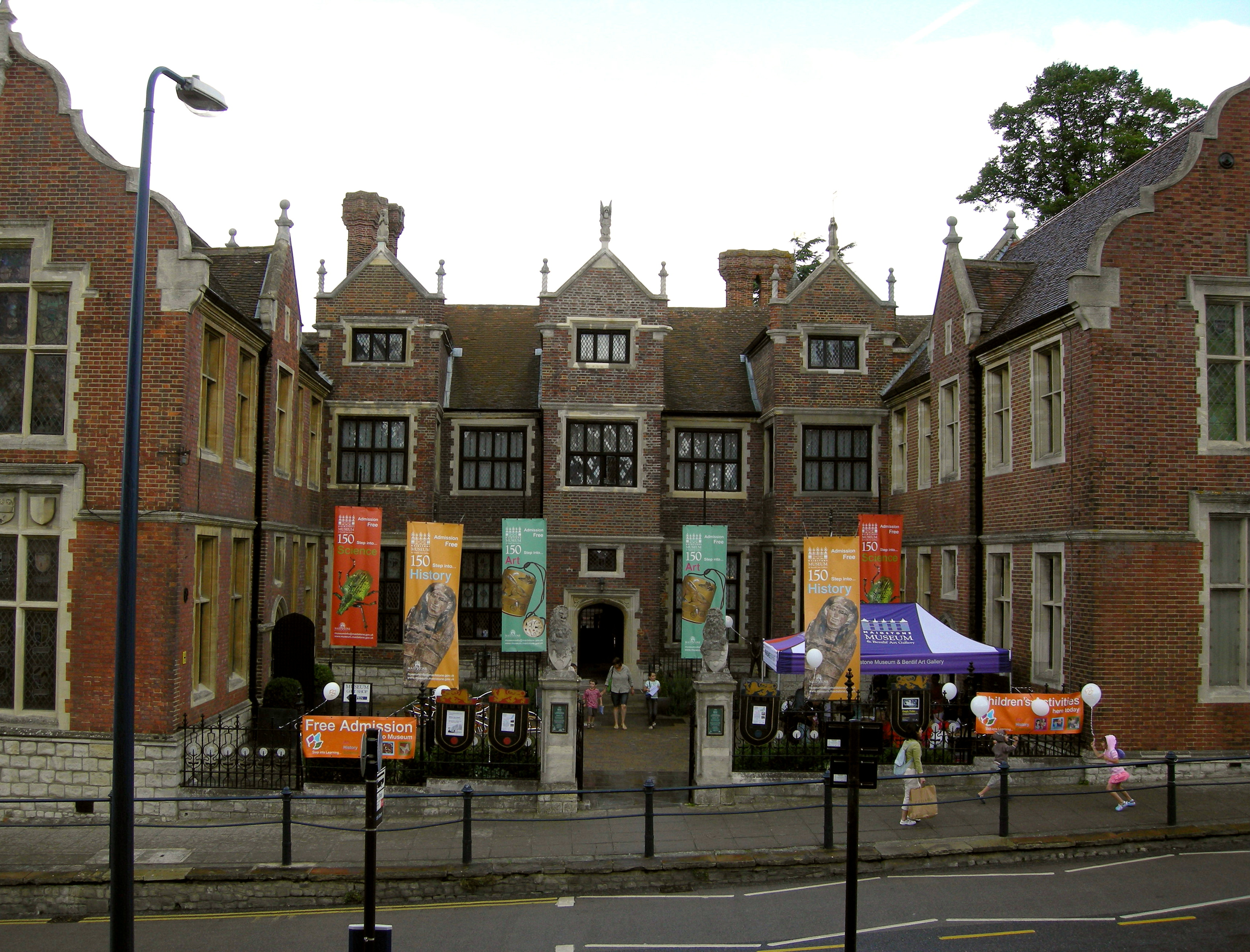
Finds from the 1957 excavation are stored at Maidstone Museum

Antiquarians have been aware of Chestnuts Long Barrow since the 18th century. The earliest possible reference to the monuments was provided by the antiquarian John Harris in an ambiguous comment in his History of Kent in Five Parts, published in 1719. In 1773, the site was described in print by the antiquarian Josiah Colebrooke in a short article for Archaeologia, the journal of the Society of Antiquaries of London. He described it as one of the "temples of the antient Britons". Colebrook's analysis was echoed in the 18th-century writings of Edward Hasted, W. H. Ireland, and John Thorpe. In the early 1840s, the Reverend Beale Post conducted investigations into the Medway Megaliths, writing them up in a manuscript that was left unpublished; this included Addington Long Barrow and Chestnuts Long Barrow, which he collectively labelled the "Addington Circles".

In the late 1940s, the site was visited by the archaeologists John H. Evans and Albert Egges van Giffen, with the former commenting that they examined the site in its "overgrown state". In 1953, the archaeologist Leslie Grinsell reported that several small trees and bushes had grown up within the megaliths. That year, the field was prepared for horticultural use, being levelled and ploughed, although the area around the megaliths was left undisturbed. At this time, 16 megaliths were visible, lying at various angles. A 15-metre (50-foot) high holly tree stood in the centre of them, and there was no sign of a mound. The landowner, Richard Boyle, opened a few test trenches in the area, during which he discovered Mesolithic flint tools. A large number of surface finds were discovered in both the field and a quarry 30 metres (100 feet) to the east.

In the latter part of the 1950s, with plans afoot to build a house adjacent to Chestnuts Long Barrow, the Inspectorate of Ancient Monuments initiated an excavation of the site under the directorship of John Alexander. The excavation, which lasted five weeks in August and September 1957, was funded by Boyle, with the support of the Inspectorate, and largely carried out by volunteers. Following excavation, the fallen sarsen megaliths were re-erected in their original sockets, allowing for the restoration of part of the chamber and façade. The finds recovered from the excavation were placed in Maidstone Museum. Alexander's subsequent excavation report was described by Ashbee as "comprehensive" and "a model of its kind", and by Jessup as "a notable example of modern archaeology in the field".
