= Finnish Olympic Sauna =

Historic sauna in Aylesford, England

- Type: Sauna
- Location: Cobdown Park, Aylesford ME20 6DD, England
- Coordinates: 51.3015°N 0.4534°E
- Built: 1948
- Architect: Toivo Jäntti

Listed Building – Grade II
- Official name: Finnish Olympic Sauna
- Designated: 15 January 2024
- Reference no.: 1487251

The Finnish Sauna Bath London 1948, also known in the British context as the Finnish Olympic Sauna or the Cobdown Sauna (after its current location), is a sauna facility located in Cobdown Park, Aylesford, Kent, England.

It was built by the Finnish timber building supplier Puutalo for use by the athletes and other members of the Finnish team at the London 1948 Olympics, in line with Finland's tradition of building 'Olympic saunas' for its athletes' use going back to the Paris 1924 games.

The sauna was originally located in the athletes' village in Richmond Park, London, from where it was moved to the Reed Paper Mill in Aylesford a year later, and eventually from there to its current location nearby in 1957.

Of single-storey, wooden, prefabricated construction, the building was designed by Finnish architect Toivo Jäntti. It comprises the sauna room as well as a washroom, a dressing/massage room, and a kitchen.

The facility was in regular use until 2020, when it was closed down for safety reasons pending refurbishment.

It is thought to be England's oldest purpose-built sauna still in use, and the oldest surviving Finnish 'Olympic sauna' anywhere in the world.

In January 2024, the building received Grade II listed status from Historic England.
