= Kit's Coty House =

Dolmen in England

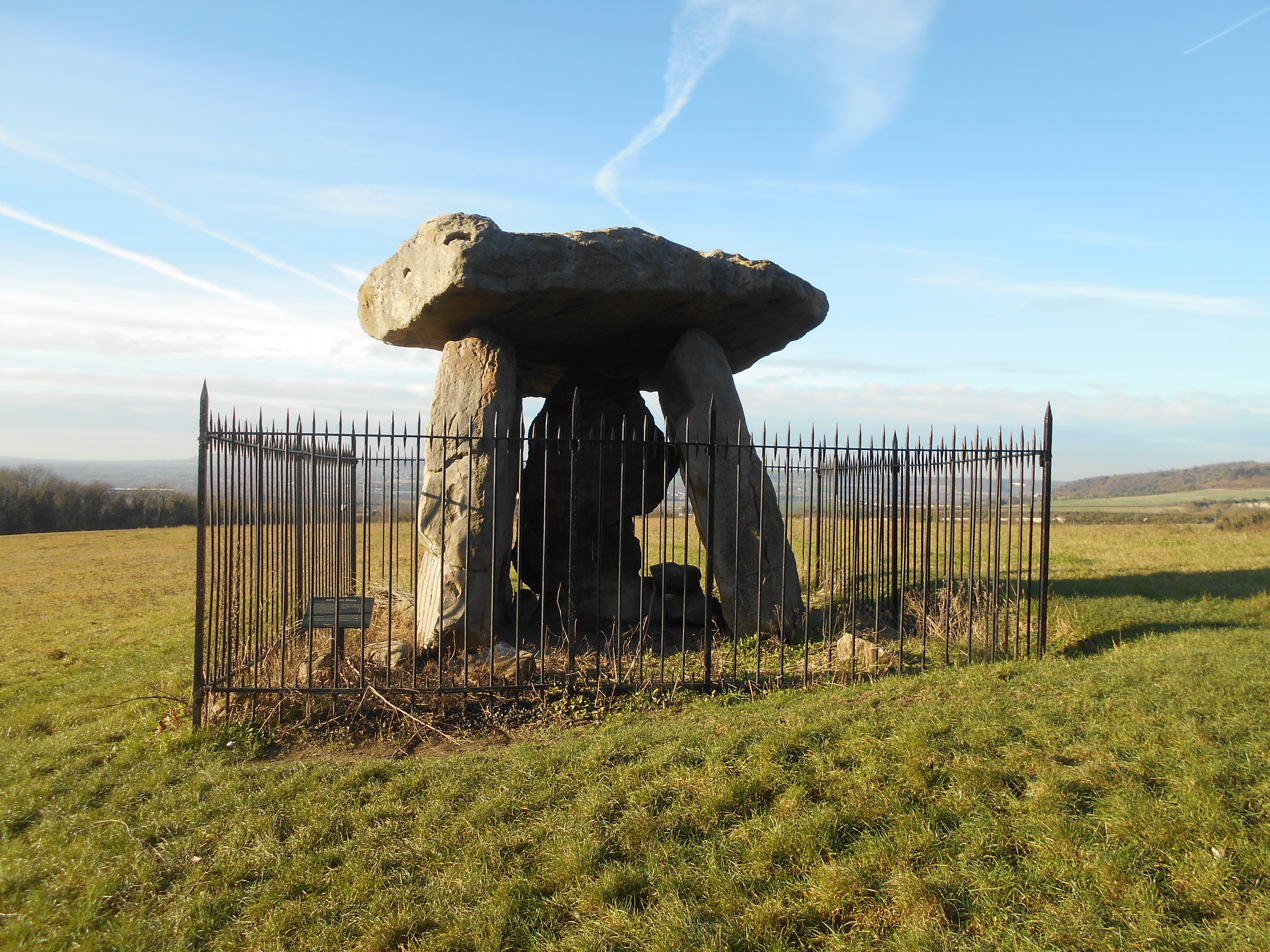
- The monument with the Medway Valley behind

- Location within Kent
- Coordinates: 51°19′12″N 0°30′11″E
- Type: Long barrow

Kit's Coty House or Kit's Coty is a chambered long barrow near the village of Aylesford in the southeastern English county of Kent. Constructed circa 4000 BCE, during the Early Neolithic period of British prehistory, today it survives in a ruined state.

Archaeologists have established that the monument was built by pastoralist communities shortly after the introduction of agriculture to Britain from continental Europe. Although representing part of an architectural tradition of long barrow building that was widespread across Neolithic Europe, Kit's Coty House belongs to a localised regional variant of barrows produced in the vicinity of the River Medway, now known as the Medway Megaliths. Of these, it lies near to both Little Kit's Coty House and the Coffin Stone on the eastern side of the river. Three further surviving long barrows, Addington Long Barrow, Chestnuts Long Barrow, and Coldrum Long Barrow, are located west of the Medway.

They were among the first ancient British remains to be protected by the state, on the advice of General Augustus Pitt-Rivers, the first Inspector of Ancient Monuments. The site is now under the ownership of non-departmental public body English Heritage, and is open to visitors all year round.

Kit's Coty can be reached on foot along a track that appears at the junction where the Pilgrim's Way and Rochester Road meet. The chamber is encircled by iron railings. It lies approximately 2 kilometres north of another of the Medway Megaliths, Little Kit's Coty House.

The name Kit's Coty allegedly means "Tomb in the Forest" according to signs at the site, possibly related to the Ancient British *kaitom, later *keiton, meaning "forest". The site is the namesake of Kitscoty, a village in Alberta, Canada. The inclusion of the term "House" in the site's name has confused some visitors, who have gone to the site expecting a built dwelling.

== Context ==
Interactive map of Kit's Coty House

The Early Neolithic was a revolutionary period of British history. Between 4500 and 3800 BCE, it saw a widespread change in lifestyle as the communities living in the British Isles adopted agriculture as their primary form of subsistence, abandoning the hunter-gatherer lifestyle that had characterised the preceding Mesolithic period. This came about through contact with continental societies, although it is unclear to what extent this can be attributed to an influx of migrants or to indigenous Mesolithic Britons adopting agricultural technologies from the continent. The region of modern Kent would have been a key area for the arrival of continental European settlers and visitors, because of its position on the estuary of the River Thames and its proximity to the continent.

Britain was largely forested in this period; widespread forest clearance did not occur in Kent until the Late Bronze Age (c.1000 to 700 BCE). Environmental data from the vicinity of the White Horse Stone, a putatively prehistoric monolith near the River Medway, supports the idea that the area was still largely forested in the Early Neolithic, covered by a woodland of oak, ash, hazel/alder and Maloideae. Throughout most of Britain, there is little evidence of cereal or permanent dwellings from this period, leading archaeologists to believe that the Early Neolithic economy on the island was largely pastoral, relying on herding cattle, with people living a nomadic or semi-nomadic life.

=== Medway Megaliths ===
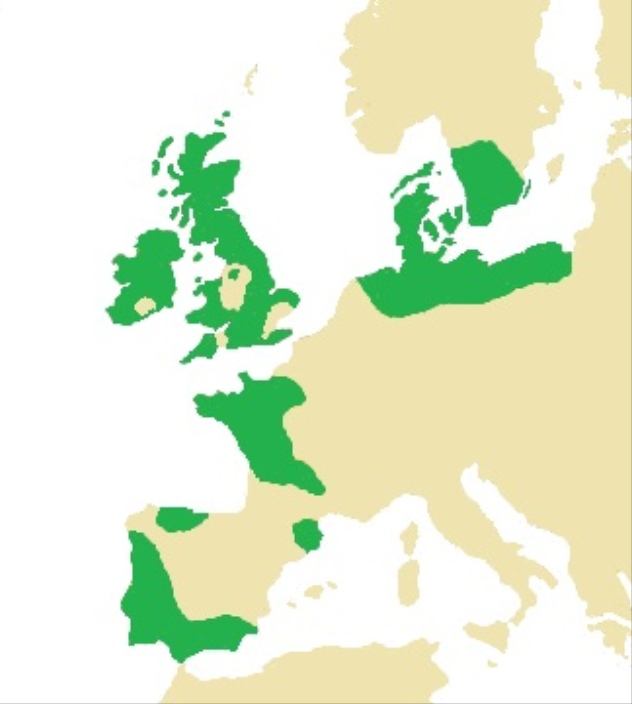
The construction of long barrows and related funerary monuments took place in various parts of Europe during the Early Neolithic (distribution pictured)

Across Western Europe, the Early Neolithic marked the first period in which humans built monumental structures in the landscape. These structures included chambered long barrows, rectangular or oval earthen tumuli which had a chamber built into one end. Some of these chambers were constructed out of timber, although others were built using large stones, now known as "megaliths". These long barrows often served as tombs, housing the physical remains of the dead within their chamber. Individuals were rarely buried alone in the Early Neolithic, instead being interred in collective burials with other members of their community. These chambered tombs were built all along the Western European seaboard during the Early Neolithic, from southeastern Spain up to southern Sweden, taking in most of the British Isles; the architectural tradition was introduced to Britain from continental Europe in the first half of the fourth millennium BCE. Although there are stone buildings—like Göbekli Tepe in modern Turkey—which predate them, the chambered long barrows constitute humanity's first widespread tradition of construction using stone.

Although now all in a ruinous state and not retaining their original appearance, at the time of construction the Medway Megaliths would have been some of the largest and most visually imposing Early Neolithic funerary monuments in Britain. Grouped along the River Medway as it cuts through the North Downs, they constitute the most southeasterly group of megalithic monuments in the British Isles, and the only megalithic group in eastern England. The archaeologists Brian Philp and Mike Dutto deemed the Medway Megaliths to be "some of the most interesting and well known" archaeological sites in Kent, while the archaeologist Paul Ashbee described them as "the most grandiose and impressive structures of their kind in southern England".

The Medway Megaliths can be divided into two separate clusters: one to the west of the River Medway and the other on Blue Bell Hill to the east, with the distance between the two clusters measuring at between 8 and 10 kilometres (5 and 6 mi). The western group includes Coldrum Long Barrow, Addington Long Barrow, and the Chestnuts Long Barrow. The eastern group consists of Smythe's Megalith, Kit's Coty House, Little Kit's Coty House, the Coffin Stone, and several other stones which might have once been parts of chambered tombs, most notably the White Horse Stone. It is not known if they were all built at the same time, or whether they were constructed in succession, while similarly it is not known if they each served the same function or whether there was a hierarchy in their usage.

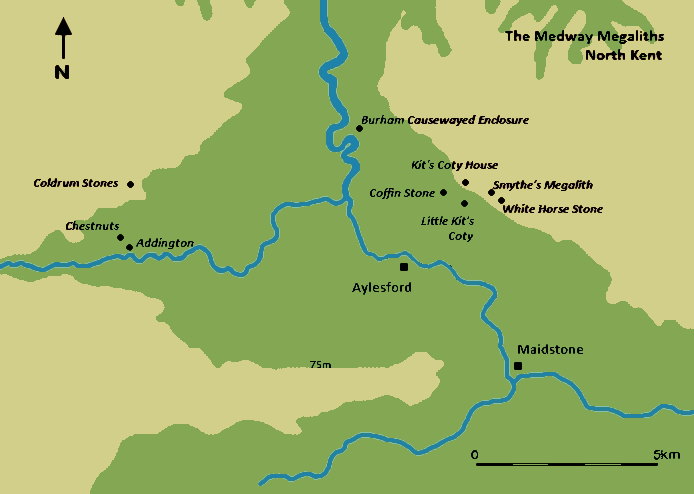
Map of the Medway Megaliths around the River Medway

The Medway long barrows all conformed to the same general design plan, and are all aligned on an east to west axis. Each had a stone chamber at the eastern end of the mound, and they each probably had a stone facade flanking the entrance. They had internal heights of up to 3.0 metres (10 feet), making them taller than most other chambered long barrows in Britain. The chambers were constructed from sarsen, a dense, hard, and durable stone that occurs naturally throughout Kent, having formed out of sand from the Eocene epoch. Early Neolithic builders would have selected blocks from the local area, and then transported them to the site of the monument to be erected.

These common architectural features among the Medway Megaliths indicate a strong regional cohesion with no direct parallels elsewhere in the British Isles. Nevertheless, as with other regional groupings of Early Neolithic long barrows—such as the Cotswold-Severn group in south-western Britain—there are also various idiosyncrasies in the different monuments, such as Coldrum's rectilinear shape, the Chestnut Long Barrow's facade, and the long, thin mounds at Addington and Kit's Coty. These variations might have been caused by the tombs being altered and adapted over the course of their use; in this scenario, the monuments would be composite structures.

The builders of these monuments were probably influenced by pre-existing tomb-shrines they were aware of. Whether those people had grown up locally, or moved into the Medway area from elsewhere is not known. Based on a stylistic analysis of their architectural designs, the archaeologist Stuart Piggott thought that the plan behind the Medway Megaliths had originated in the area around the Low Countries; conversely, Glyn Daniel thought their design derived from Scandinavia, John H. Evans thought Germany, and Ronald F. Jessup suggested an influence from the Cotswold-Severn group. Ashbee noted that their close clustering in the same area was reminiscent of the megalithic tomb-shrine traditions of continental Northern Europe, and emphasised that the Medway Megaliths were a regional manifestation of a tradition widespread across Early Neolithic Europe. He nevertheless stressed that a precise place of origin was "impossible to indicate" with the available evidence.

== Design and construction ==
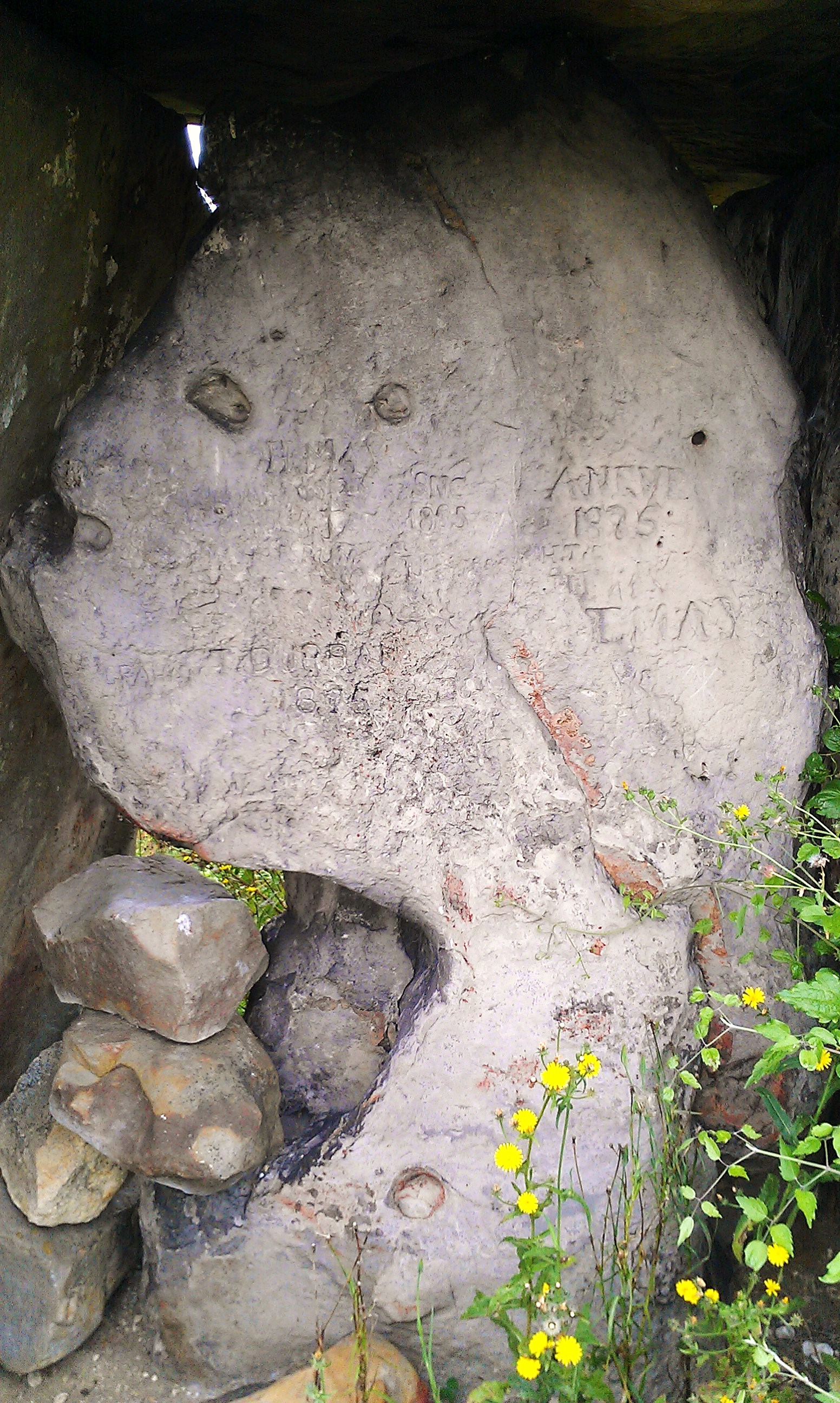
The back slab of the megalith, engraved with much graffiti.

The surviving part of the monument represents three stones covered by a capstone. The H-shaped entrance to the tomb survives. It is made of sarsen (a fine-grained, crystalline sandstone) and consists of three orthostats supporting a horizontal capstone. The archaeologist Timothy Champion suggested that these stones "give some idea of the scale of the sculpture". The front part of the chamber, as well as a possible façade, are now gone.

The mound and flanking ditches have largely been ploughed flat but remain visible from aerial photographs. A 1981 survey found the mound to be circa 70 metres long and 1 metre high. Champion suggested that in total, the long-barrow would have been about 80m long. As a result of chalk rubble in the plough soul, it estimated that it had once been c.11 to 15 metres wide. An area of dark soil suggested that there had been a wide ditch on the southern side.

Ashbee noted that various worn pottery sherds had been found in the soil on the barrow. In 1897, John Evans recounted as having found a leaf-shaped arrowhead—likely of Neolithic date—near to the site.

=== The General's Tombstone ===
At the western end of the monument was a megalith known as "the General's Tombstone", which was destroyed in 1867. This may once have been part of the long barrow's structure.

== Damage and dilapidation ==
Ashbee suggested that when the barrow was being slighted, the kerbstones might have been dragged away or buried under the ditches.

== Folklore, folk tradition, and modern Paganism ==
In 1722, the antiquarian Hercules Ayleway noted—in a letter written to his friend, the fellow antiquarian William Stukeley—a local belief that the Lower Kit's Coty House and Kit's Coty House were erected in memory of two contending kings of Kent who died in battle.

In 1946, Evans recorded a local folk tale that held that the chamber at Kit's Coty House was erected by three witches who lived on Blue Bell Hill. According to this story, a fourth witch helped them put the capstone on.

Several modern Pagan religions are practised at the Medway Megaliths, the most publicly visible of which is Druidry. Research conducted among these Druids in 2014 revealed that some Druidic ceremonial activity had taken place at Kit's Coty.

== Antiquarian and archaeological investigation ==
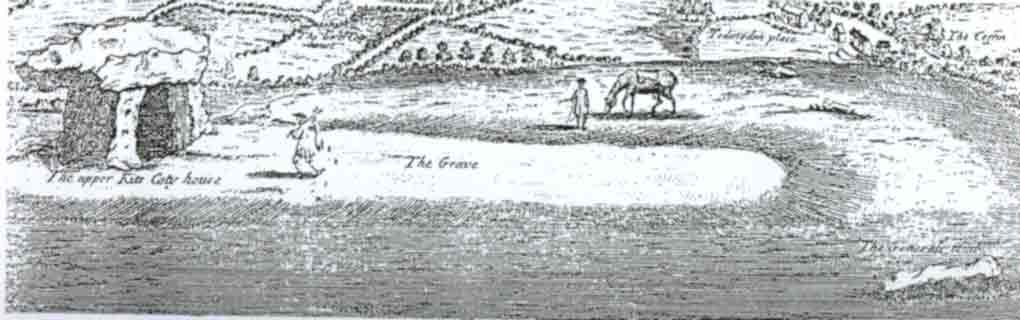
Stukeley's 1722 prospect of Kit's Coty House with its remnant long barrow still just visible and labelled "The Grave"

Kit's Coty House was briefly mentioned in John Twyne's De Rebus Albionicis (written c.1550, but not published until 1590), and in William Camden's Britannia (1586): Camden reported the popular tradition that it was the tomb of the 5th-century British prince Catigern, supposedly killed at the Battle of Aylesford in 455.

In 1590, a group of antiquaries visited the site. One of them, John Stow, wrote:

It was one great flat stone in the mydst standinge up right, & ij othar the lyke or greatar stones, on eche syd one in closynge the ij edge sydes of the mydle stone, and then one greatar flat stone lyenge flat over and above the othar thre. And about one quoyts cast from this monument lyethe one othar very greate stone, moche parte therof in the erthe.

Stow published a version of this report in his Annals in 1592; while another of the group, William Lambarde, published his own description in the 1596 edition of his Perambulation of Kent, drawing a comparison with Stonehenge. Camden described the monument in greater detail from personal observation in the expanded 1610 English translation of Britannia:

under the side of a hill I saw foure, huge, rude, hard stones erected, two for the sides, one transversall in the midest betweene them, and the hugest of all piled and laied over them in manner of the British monument which is called Stone-heng but not so artificially with mortis and tenents. Verily the unskilfull common people terme it at this day, of the same Catigern, Keiths or Kits Coty house.

In 1659, Thomas Philipot wrote about the site, again describing it as the tomb of Catigern.

The antiquarian John Aubrey made mention of the monument in his unpublished manuscript on British archaeological sites, the Monumenta Britannica. There he included a drawing of the site produced by the classical scholar Thomas Gale. Aubrey then directly cited Philipot's earlier work. There is no direct evidence that Aubrey visited the site but Ashbee thought it "inconceivable that he did not" given that he made frequent visits to Kent, using a road which would have taken him very close to Kit's Coty House.

William Stukeley visited the site in 1722 and was able to sketch the site whilst it was still largely intact. Before this, Samuel Pepys also saw it and wrote:

Three great stones standing upright and a great round one lying on them, of great bigness, although not so big as those on Salisbury Plain. But certainly it is a thing of great antiquity, and I am mightily glad to see it.

Stukeley included four engravings of Kit's Coty House in his two volumes of Itinerarium Curiosum. A 1722 print of the site showed the chamber, mound, and the General's Tombstone.

In c.1783, James Douglas set one of his workmen to dig on the western side of the monument, and produced a watercolour painting illustrating the scene.

In 1880, the archaeologist Flinders Petrie included the stones at Addington in his list of Kentish earthworks. In 1893, the antiquarian George Payne mentioned the monument in his Collectanea Cantiana, describing it as a "fallen cromlech" and noting that there were various other megaliths scattered in the vicinity, suggesting that these were part of the monument of another like it, since destroyed.

In his 1924 publication dealing with Kent, the archaeologist O. G. S. Crawford, then working as the archaeological officer for the Ordnance Survey, listed Kit's Coty House alongside the other Medway Megaliths and reprinted one of Stukeley's engravings of it.

The author George Orwell visited the site on 21 August 1938, as detailed in his domestic diary of that date. He describes it as "a druidical altar or something of the kind. ... The stones are on top of a high hill & it appears they belong to quite another part of the country." The stones are actually well down the slope of Blue Bell Hill, 1.32 km to the north.

In January 1981, Kent Archaeological Rescue Unit carried out a survey of the site.

=== Management by English Heritage ===
Ashbee suggested that Kit's Coty House was "the best known" of the Medway Megaliths, while Champion thought it "perhaps the best-known monument in Kent". In 2005, Philp and Dutto referred to Kit's Coty as an "important monument" that was "amongst the best known in Britain".
