= Britain's Bravest Manufacturing Company =

British veterans' organisation

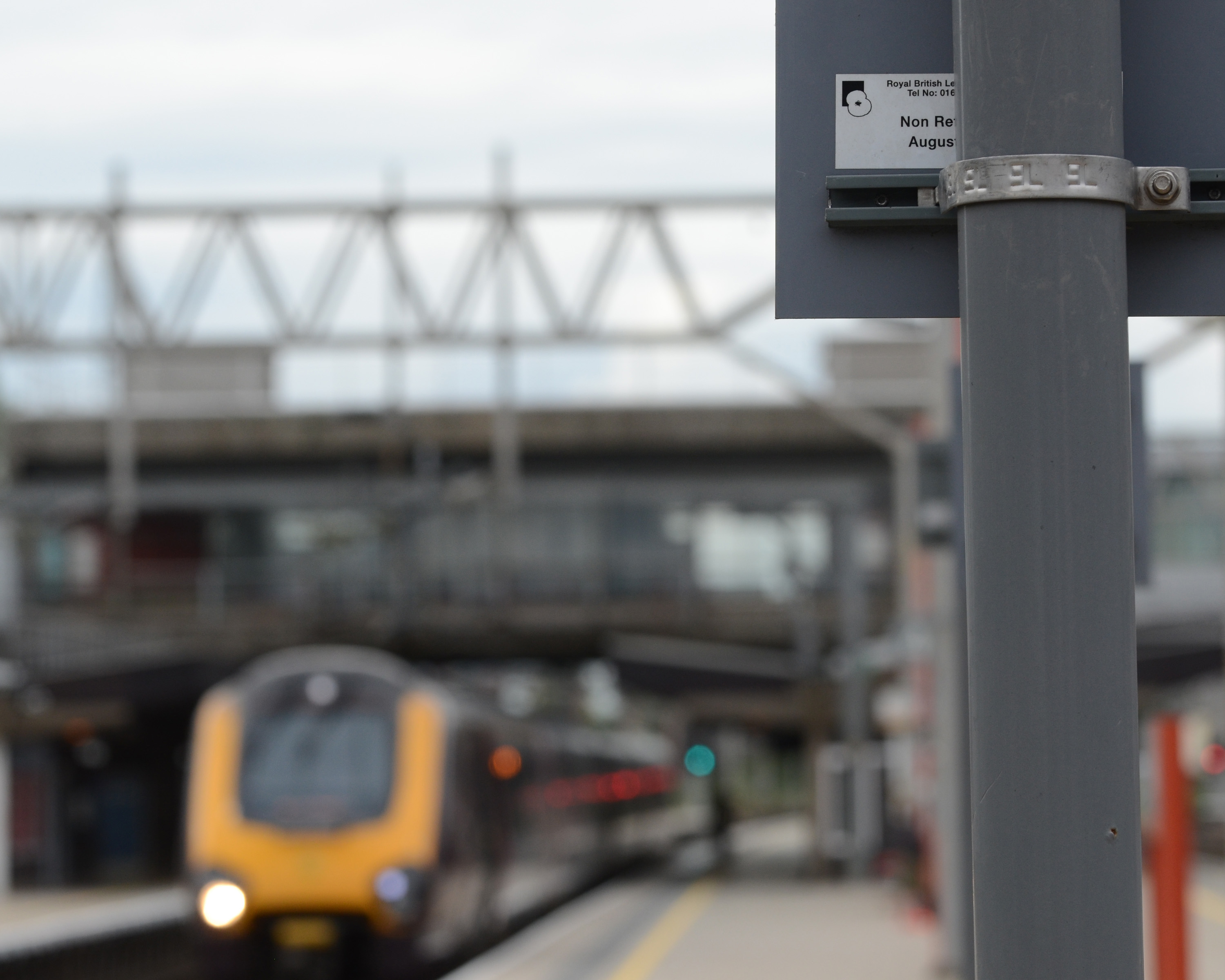
- BBMC sign on Stafford railway station from when the company was it was known as the RBLI's social enterprise.
- Type: Social enterprise
- Industry: Manufacturing
- Predecessor: Royal British Legion Industries (RBLI)
- Founded: 1919 in Aylesford, Kent, England
- Headquarters: Aylesford, England
- Area served: United Kingdom
- Key people: Steve Sherry (Chief Executive)
- Number of employees: 110
- Parent: Royal British Legion Industries
- Website: Website

Britain's Bravest Manufacturing Company (BBMC) is a social enterprise company based in England, which employs Armed Forces veterans and people with disabilities. It aims to produce four things: signs, wooden pallets, print & mail and fulfilment.

== History ==
The company is a division of national charity Royal British Legion Industries (RBLI), which was founded in 1919 as Industrial Settlements Inc. RBLI's mission was to help veterans from the First World War during their rehabilitation. The company had taken possession of Preston Hall in Aylesford and was providing care to tuberculous ex-servicemen. Some of the men found that having something to do whilst recuperating, helped not only to pass the time, but also to help engage their brains and bodies. This is how the company's manufacturing division, now Britain's Bravest Manufacturing Company, was born. Britain's Bravest Manufacturing Company currently has two factories, one in Kent and another in Surrey which manufactures the same products in the range. Previously known simply as RBLI's social enterprise, the division was rebranded as Britain's Bravest Manufacturing Company in April 2016.

The factory in Aylesford operates from a 70-acre (28 ha) site and its aim is to provide veterans with long-term careers. Some of the workers arrive directly from the forces whilst some have spent some time in the civilian world before going to BBMC.

== Ethos ==
The company is run on a social care ethos with the intent and focus being on the ex-service men and women who work in the manufacturing side. They produce signs, wooden pallets and print & mailing items. In 2015–2016, the company turnover was £5 million, though this a surplus and was re-invested in the company rather being seen as profit. The signs that the company produce have mostly been used on the UK railway network with Network Rail being the most numerous consumer (with Railtrack and British Rail before it) in a relationship that spans 25 years. In the financial year 2015–2016, BBMC supplied 110 signs and made £493,000 from Network Rail. The market for signs has changed in recent years with 60% of signs manufactured used by the railway industry and 40% for the road industry.

The main aim of Britain's Bravest Manufacturing Company is to provide work to ex-service personnel and disabled people, however they also promote other causes of the main RBLI charity including LifeWorks, an employment support programme which helps veterans around the UK to find work in various industries.
