= Lowey of Tonbridge =

The Lowey of Tonbridge is the name of a large tract of land given to Richard Fitz Gilbert (1024–1090) in West Kent, England by William the Conqueror after the Norman conquest of England.

Richard was a cousin of William's, both being descended from Richard "The Fearless" the first Duke of Normandy. The Lowey (also known as Lowry), which simply means "Freedom" or "Liberty", gave Richard huge powers over the region and he used this power to extract taxes from the local population to finance the building of Tonbridge Castle, which became the main de Clare family residence for the next 250 years.

Richard used his influence and power to expand the Lowey so by the time of the Domesday Book it included much of Surrey as well as Kent. This continuous expansion of the estate put the de Clare family into dispute with the Archbishops of Canterbury and the king was asked to intervene twice to decide how large it should actually be.

When the de Clare family got on the wrong side of the crown, the castle and its Lowey was the first thing the king seized back from them often by force and this happened in the reigns of kings William II, John and Henry III. The castle and Lowey were returned to the family once the dispute had been resolved.

After the death of Gilbert de Clare, 8th Earl of Gloucester at the Battle of Bannockburn in 1314 aged only 23 without an heir, Hugh the younger de Spencer, who had married the earl's oldest sister could not wait for Edward II to decide how his estate should be divided, and seized the Lowey and castle without permission. His tenure was quite short-lived as he was executed by Queen Isabella, the wife of Edward II.

The Lowey had two large deer parks, North Frith and South Frith, whose names still survive today.

The Lowey survived well into the 19th century; in fact Tonbridge was one of England's largest parishes.
