= Smythe's Megalith =

Neolithic monument in Kent, England

- Clement Smythe's 1822 sketch of the chamber at Smythe's Megalith. It was destroyed the same day it was discovered.

- Location within Kent
- 51°19′N 0°31′E (approx.)
- Type: Long barrow

Smythe's Megalith, also known as the Warren Farm Chamber, was a chambered long barrow near the village of Aylesford in the south-eastern English county of Kent. Probably constructed in the 4th millennium BCE, during Britain's Early Neolithic period, it was discovered in 1822, at which point it was dismantled. Built out of earth and at least five local sarsen megaliths, the long barrow consisted of a roughly rectangular earthen tumulus with a stone chamber in its eastern end. Human remains were deposited into this chamber.

Archaeologists have established that the monument was built by pastoralist communities shortly after the introduction of agriculture to Britain from continental Europe. Although representing part of an architectural tradition of long barrow building widespread across Neolithic Europe, Smythe's Megalith belonged to a localised regional variant produced in the vicinity of the River Medway, now known as the Medway Megaliths. Several of these still survive: Coldrum Long Barrow, Addington Long Barrow, and Chestnuts Long Barrow are on the river's western side, while Kit's Coty House, the Little Kit's Coty House, and the Coffin Stone are on the eastern side nearer to Smythe's Megalith. Close to the site of the lost monument is the White Horse Stone, a standing stone that may have once been part of another chambered long barrow.

The site may have been ransacked during the Middle Ages, as other Medway Megaliths were. By the early 19th century it was buried beneath soil, largely due to millennia of hillwash coming down from the adjacent Blue Bell Hill. In 1822, it was discovered by farm labourers ploughing the land; the local antiquarians Clement Smythe and Thomas Charles were called in to examine it. Shortly after, the labourers pulled away the stones and dispersed most of the human remains, destroying the monument. Smythe and Charles produced, but did not publish, reports on their findings, and these have been discussed by archaeologists since the mid-20th century.

== Location ==
Smythe's Megalith was located on the south-facing combe of Blue Bell Hill, within the vicinity of Warren Farm, near the village of Aylesford in the south-eastern English county of Kent. The location where it was found lies in a large field now to the east of the A229 dual carriageway. Nothing of the monument can now be seen and the specific location cannot be publicly accessed.

== Context ==
The Early Neolithic was a revolutionary period of British history. Between 4500 and 3800 BCE, it saw a widespread change in lifestyle as the communities living in the British Isles adopted agriculture as their primary form of subsistence, abandoning the hunter-gatherer lifestyle that had characterised the preceding Mesolithic period. This came about through contact with continental European societies, although it is unclear to what extent this can be attributed to an influx of migrants or to indigenous Mesolithic Britons adopting agricultural technologies from the continent. The region of modern Kent would have been key for the arrival of continental European settlers and visitors, because of its position on the estuary of the River Thames and its proximity to the continent.

Britain was then largely forested; widespread forest clearance did not occur in Kent until the Late Bronze Age (c.1000 to 700 BCE). Environmental data from the vicinity of the White Horse Stone, a putatively prehistoric monolith near the River Medway, supports the idea that the area was still largely forested in the Early Neolithic, covered by a woodland of oak, ash, hazel/alder and amygdaloideae. Throughout most of Britain, there is little evidence of cereal or permanent dwellings from this period, leading archaeologists to believe that the island's Early Neolithic economy was largely pastoral, relying on herding cattle, with people living a nomadic or semi-nomadic life.

=== Medway Megaliths ===
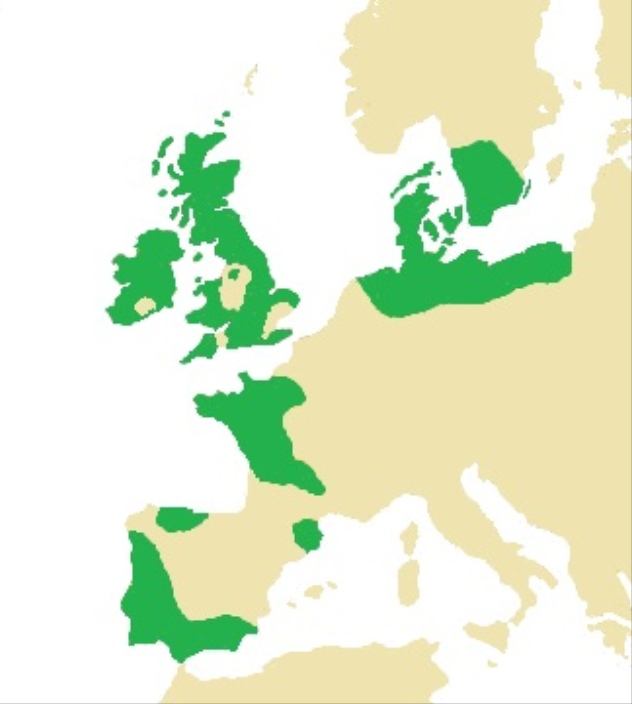
The construction of long barrows and related funerary monuments took place in various parts of Europe during the Early Neolithic (known distribution pictured)

Across Western Europe, the Early Neolithic marks the first period in which humans built monumental structures in the landscape. These constructs include chambered long barrows, rectangular or oval earthen tumuli which had a chamber built into one end. Some of these chambers were constructed from timber, although others were built using large stones, now known as "megaliths". The long barrows often served as tombs, housing the physical remains of the dead within their chamber. Individuals were rarely buried alone in the Early Neolithic, instead being interred in collective burials with other members of their community. These chambered tombs were built all along the Western European seaboard during the Early Neolithic, from southeastern Spain up to southern Sweden, taking in most of the British Isles; the architectural tradition was introduced to Britain from continental Europe in the first half of the fourth millennium BCE. Although there are stone buildings—like Göbekli Tepe in modern Turkey—which predate them, the chambered long barrows constitute humanity's first widespread tradition of construction using stone.

Although now all ruined and not retaining their original appearance, at the time of construction the Medway Megaliths would have been some of the largest and most visually imposing Early Neolithic funerary monuments in Britain. Grouped along the River Medway as it cuts through the North Downs, they constitute the most southeasterly group of megalithic monuments in the British Isles, and the only megalithic group in eastern England. The archaeologists Brian Philp and Mike Dutto deemed the Medway Megaliths to be "some of the most interesting and well known" archaeological sites in Kent, while the archaeologist Paul Ashbee described them as "the most grandiose and impressive structures of their kind in southern England".

The megaliths can be divided into two separate clusters: one to the west of the River Medway and the other on Blue Bell Hill to the east, with a distance between the two clusters of between 8 and 10 kilometres (5 and 6 miles). The western group includes Coldrum Long Barrow, Addington Long Barrow, and the Chestnuts Long Barrow. The eastern group consists of Smythe's Megalith, Kit's Coty House, Little Kit's Coty House, the Coffin Stone, and several other stones which might have once been parts of chambered tombs, most notably the White Horse Stone. It is not known if they were all built at the same time, or whether they were constructed in succession, while similarly it is not known if they each served the same function or whether there was a hierarchy in their usage.

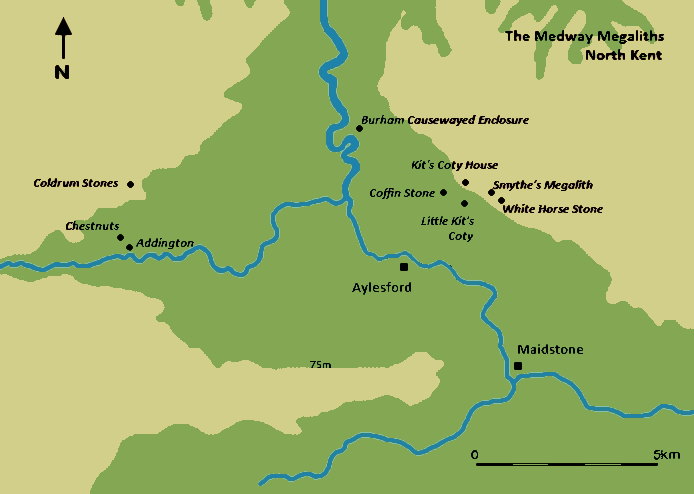
Map of the Medway Megaliths around the River Medway

The Medway long barrows all conformed to the same general design plan, and all aligned on an east to west axis. Each had a stone chamber at the eastern end of the mound, and they each probably had a stone facade flanking the entrance. The chambers were constructed from sarsen, a dense, hard, and durable stone that occurs naturally throughout Kent, having formed out of silicified sand from the Eocene epoch. Early Neolithic builders would have selected blocks from the local area, and then transported them to the site of the monument to be erected.

These common architectural features among the Medway Megaliths indicate a strong regional cohesion with no direct parallels elsewhere in the British Isles. For instance, they would have been taller than most other chambered long barrows in Britain, with internal heights of up to 3.8 metres (10 feet). Nevertheless, as with other regional groupings of Early Neolithic long barrows—like the Cotswold-Severn group in south-western Britain—there are also various idiosyncrasies in the different monuments, such as Coldrum's rectilinear shape, the Chestnut Long Barrow's facade, and the long, thin mounds at Addington and Kit's Coty. These variations might have been caused by the monuments being altered over the course of their use.

The builders were probably influenced by pre-existing tomb-shrines. It is not known if these people had grown up locally, or moved into the Medway area from elsewhere. Based on a stylistic analysis of their architectural designs, the archaeologist Stuart Piggott thought that the plan behind the Medway Megaliths had originated in the area around the Low Countries; conversely, Glyn Daniel thought their design derived from Scandinavia, John H. Evans thought Germany, and Ronald F. Jessup suggested an influence from the Cotswold-Severn group. Ashbee noted that their close clustering in the same area was reminiscent of the megalithic tomb-shrine traditions of continental Northern Europe, and emphasised that the megaliths were a regional manifestation of a tradition widespread across Early Neolithic Europe. He nevertheless stressed that a precise place of origin was "impossible to indicate" with the available evidence.

== Design ==
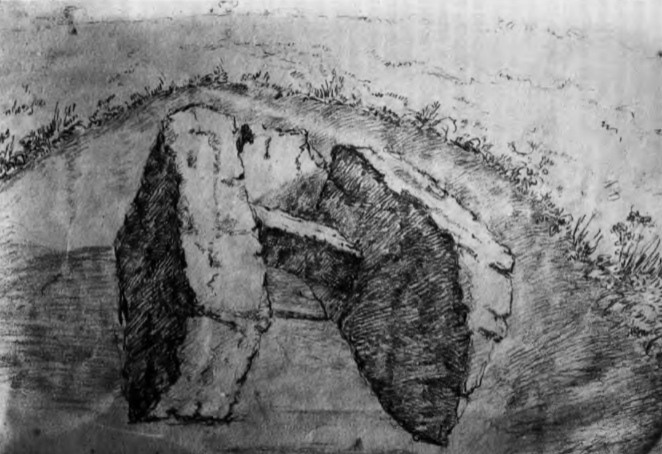
One of Clement Smythe's two illustrations of the monument

The part of the chambered long barrow that was discovered was a stone chamber composed of four large stones. The stones used were sarsens. The northern stone measured 2.3 metres (7 ft 6 in) by 1.4 metres (4 ft 9 in) by 0.36 metres (1 ft 2 in). The southern stone measured 2.1 metres (7 ft) by 1.8 metres (5 ft 9 in) by 0.69 metres (2 ft 3 in). The third stone, on the western side, measured 0.91 metres (3 ft) by 1.2 metres (4 ft) by 0.46 metres (1 ft 6 in). A fourth, smaller stone, measuring 0.91 metres (3 ft) by 0.61 metres (2 ft) by 0.30 metres (1 ft), was placed to prevent the north stone falling onto its southern counterpart. This may have once been used to divide the chamber in two. Given the recorded dimensions of the stones, Ashbee suggested that the chamber may have once measured 6.1 metres (20 ft) in length and could have included as many as ten sarsen stones in its original construction. He also suggested that it would have had a height of around 1.2 metres (4 ft), making it one of the smaller chambers in the Medway region; the chamber at Kits Cot House, for instance, reached over 1.8 metres (6 ft) in height, and that at Chestnuts Long Barrow reached a height of about 2.7 metres (9 ft).

Below these megaliths was a flat stone, measuring 1.2 metres (4 ft) in length and 0.91 metres (3 ft) in width. Lying atop this stone were human remains, reportedly aligned in an east to west orientation. Ashbee noted that such paving stones are rare in recorded chambered tombs, and suggested that it might instead have once been a cover stone that sat atop the chamber, but which had been knocked down at some point in the monument's history. In this scenario, the bones found atop it would have to have been disturbed from their original position. Also on the flat stone, near to the human remains, was the skull of a mole. A small sherd of unglazed pottery was also found with the bones. This need not have dated from the original period of the site's construction; as found at other, better-recorded sites, chambered long barrows could remain open for centuries or millennia after they were built, during which time other material was placed inside. For instance, small sherds of Beaker pottery, dating from the Late Neolithic, were found at Kit's Coty House, and the sherd found at Smythe's Megalith might also date from this period.

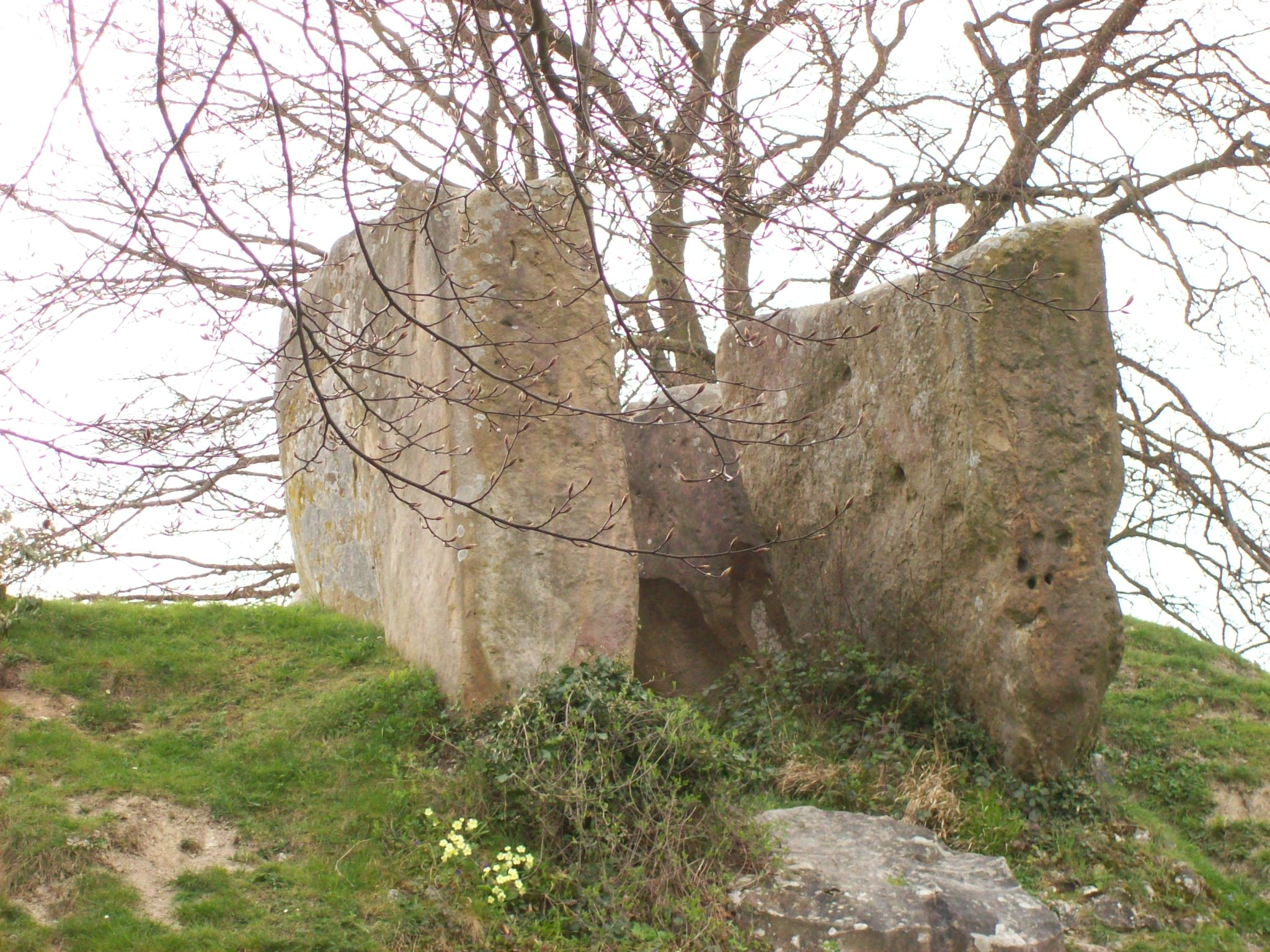
The Smythe's Megalith chamber may have looked like the surviving (and reconstructed) example at Coldrum Long Barrow (pictured)

At the time of the site's discovery, there was no apparent barrow, in part because the ground level of the area had been raised by millennia of hillwash coming down from further up Blue Bell Hill. However, as a result of what is known of this architectural style from better-recorded sites, it is apparent that this stone chamber would have been located at the eastern end of a long earthen barrow. Ashbee noted that this could have reached a length of 55 metres (180 feet). It may be that kerbstones also lined the sides of this barrow, as is evident at several other of the Medway Megaliths; Ashbee suggested that this could have contained as many as 110 or 120 sarsen stones. The monument may have had ditches flanking its sides, and chalk rubble collected in digging these ditches may have been piled up to help form the barrow.

During the Early Neolithic, the site may have been close to other chambered long barrows; the White Horse Stone, for instance, is nearby and may have once been part of the chamber of a long barrow. Various sarsen stones have been found in the vicinity of both, again perhaps reflecting the remnants of since-destroyed long barrows. To the south of the White Horse Stone was a building—termed "Structure 4806" by its excavators in the 2000s—that was constructed in the Early Neolithic period. Radiocarbon dating from the site suggests a usage date of between 4110–3820 and 3780–3530 calibrated BCE. 18 metres (59 ft) long and 8 metres (26 ft) wide, it was a longhouse of a type known from across various parts of Europe. If it had been a domestic residence, its size would mean that it was only "occupied by a small number of occupants, probably no more than a small family group". A smaller, circular building approximately 3.75 metres (12 ft) in diameter was present just to the south-east of the longhouse; there was little dating evidence for this, but what existed suggested a Late Neolithic origin. The archaeologists who excavated these buildings suggested that they might have been "houses of the living" that were intervisible with the "houses of the dead", including Smythe's Megalith. Alternately, they suggested that the longhouse was "part of the funerary tradition", used in preparing "the remains of the dead or for communal activities such as feasting".

=== Human remains ===
Analysis of the bones found in the chamber took place in the 1820s. At the time, it was noted that most of the bones were broken into small pieces—something the examiner believed had been caused by the workmen who recovered them—but that they included pieces of skull, ribs, thigh, leg, and arm bones. There were two right sides of mandibles and two portions of ulnae including the olecranon, indicating that the remains of at least two individuals were present in the chamber. Analysis of the recovered teeth showed that the molars were worn down and flattened, indicating that the deceased had been of middle age.

== Later history ==
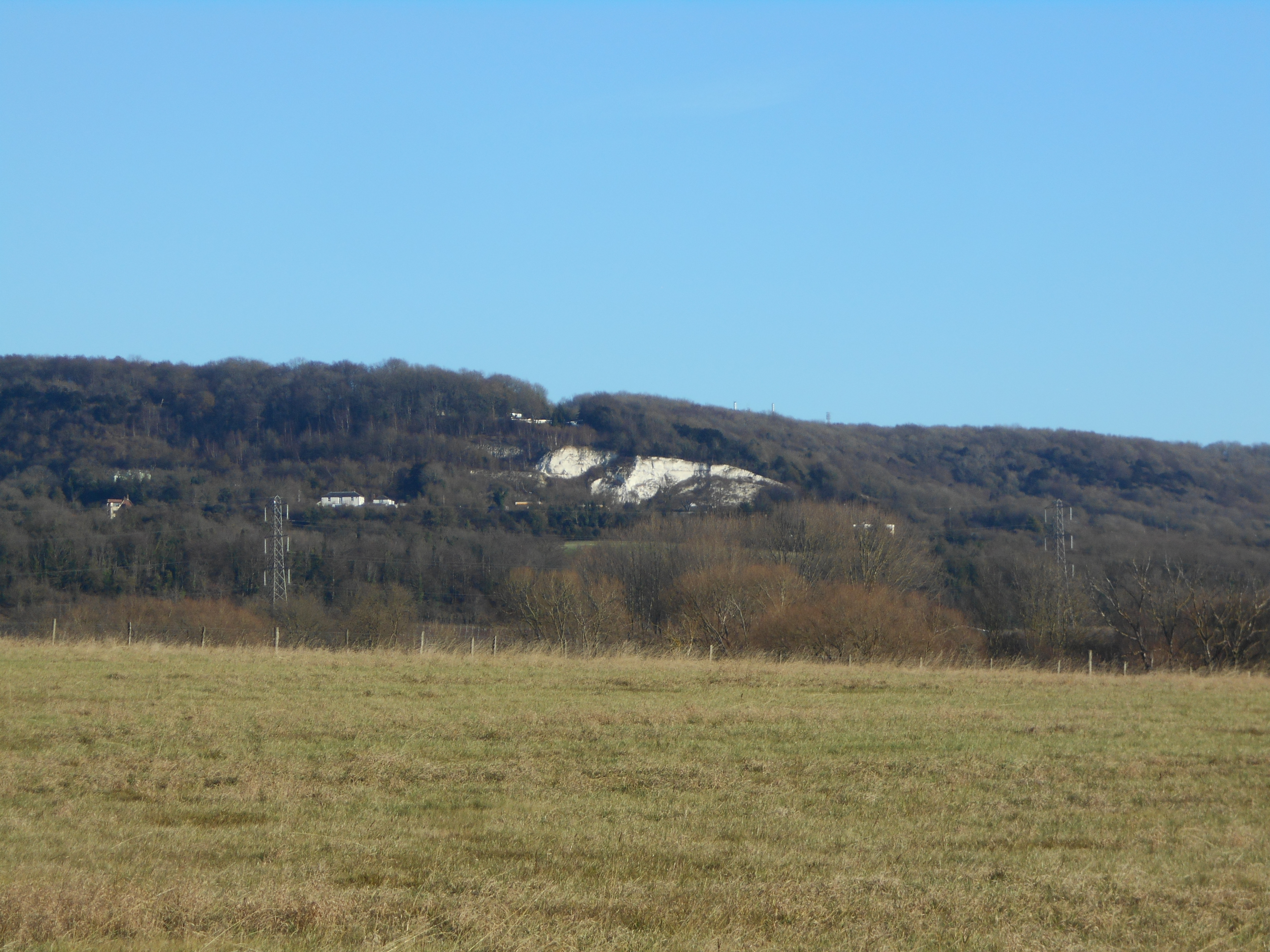
Smythe's Megalith was found on the lower slope of Blue Bell Hill.

Around 200 metres (660 ft) away from the Neolithic houses, a settlement was established on a spur of higher ground during the Late Bronze Age and Iron Age. This included several round houses and deep pits cut into the underlying chalk. These pits were perhaps originally used for corn storage, although were later infilled with ceramics, iron objects, animal bone, and two human burials. The archaeologists who investigated the site believed that this material was not just domestic refuse but had been deposited with greater meaning as part of a ritualistic act.

Ashbee suggested that the chambered long barrow may have remained visible into the Middle Ages, and at this point may have been damaged by individuals digging into it. In support of this idea, he highlighted that the archaeological excavation of Chestnuts Long Barrow had confirmed that that long barrow had been deliberately damaged in the 12th or 13th century. Similar claims of medieval destruction have also been made for Lower Kit's Coty House, Kit's Coty House, Coldrum Long Barrow, and Addington Long Barrow. Ashbee suggested that this destruction was probably due to iconoclasm, believing that the burial of the stones likely indicated that medieval Christian zealots had tried to deliberately destroy and defame the pre-Christian monument.

Conversely, the archaeologist John Alexander believed that this damage resulted from a robbery by medieval treasure hunters. Supporting this idea is comparative evidence, with the Close Roll of 1237 ordering the opening of barrows on the Isle of Wight in search for treasure, a practice that may have spread to Kent around the same time. Alexander believed that the destruction may have been brought about by a special commissioner, highlighting that the "expertness and thoroughness of the robbery"—as evidenced at Chestnuts—would have necessitated resources beyond that which a local community could likely produce.

== Discovery and investigation ==
In 1822, (Note: In his original report, Smythe claimed that the monument was discovered in "the summer of 1823", and this date was copied by Evans in his 1948 publication, and subsequently also by Philp and Dutto. Ashbee later noted that such a date was incorrect, for the monument was discovered in early 1822, after which a report about it appeared in the Maidstone Journal in July.) workmen were ploughing in a field at Warren Farm when they found that their ploughs were repeatedly striking stones beneath the surface. Removing the topsoil, they discovered three large stones several inches below. The farm's owner, George Fowle of Cobtree Manor, called in two men from Maidstone to inspect the monument: the antiquarian and historian Clement Taylor Smythe, and Thomas Charles, a doctor who lived in Maidstone and who had founded a museum at Chillington House. With Smythe present, the workmen removed the soil around the three stones, also revealing a smaller stone as part of the construct. As it was revealed, Smythe became aware of its similarity to the nearby Kit's Coty House. The stones were then removed, likely with the assistance of horses, destroying what remained of the monument.

The following day, the workmen returned to the site, where they dug deeper and revealed a flat stone on which the human remains were found; Smythe was not present on this occasion. The workmen threw most of the human remains to the side, but some were collected by Smythe and analysed by Charles.

=== Reporting ===
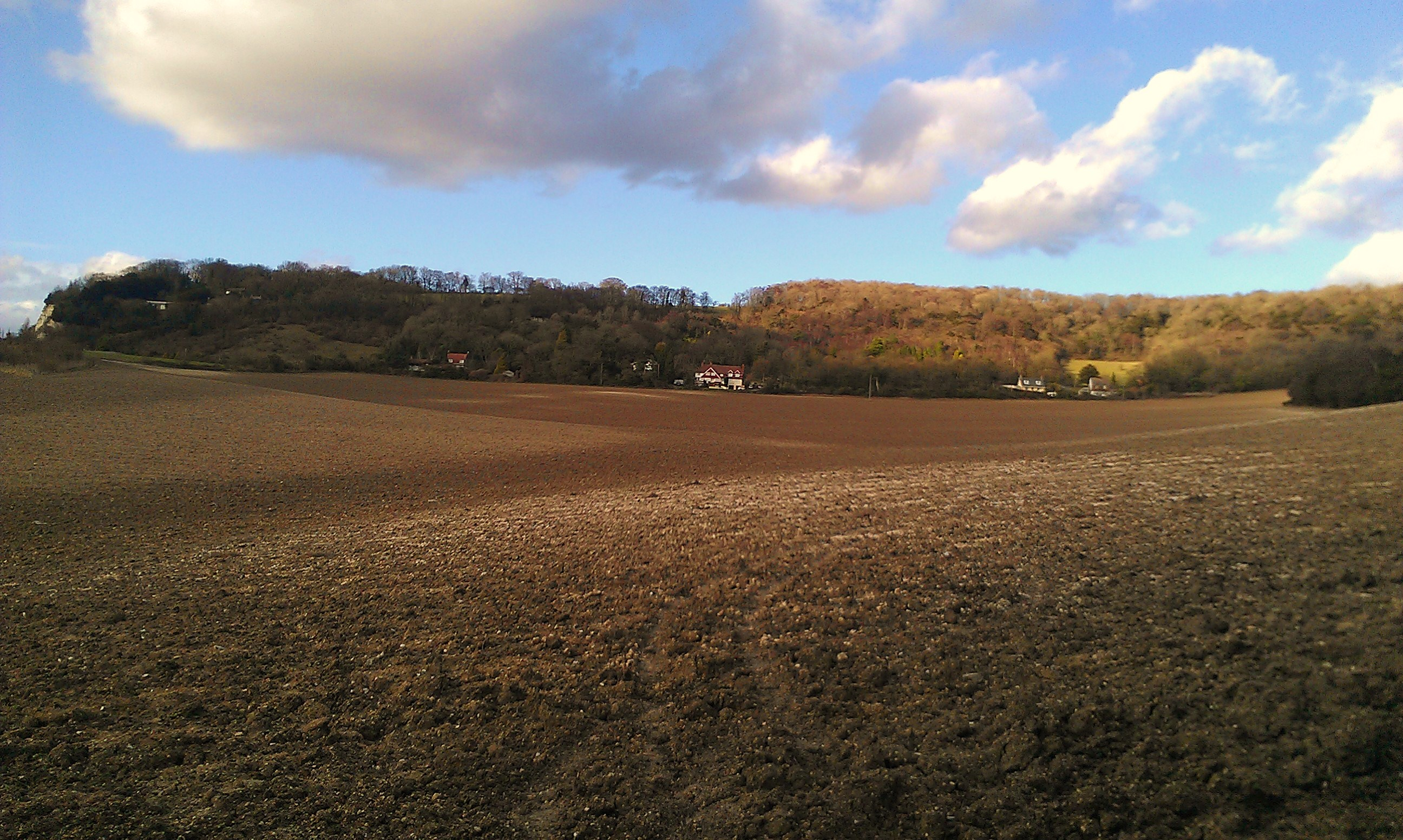
The field in which Smythe's Megalith was found, photographed in February 2014

A brief article announcing the discovery appeared in the Maidstone Journal on 4 July 1822. The information included in that article was largely repeated in an issue of the Gentleman's Magazine later that year. The latter also featured some brief discussion as to who the deceased individuals in the chamber had been, speculating that it was "some chief slain in the battle fought here between Vortimer, King of Britain, and the Saxons". A second description of the site appeared in Gentleman's Magazine in 1834, written by S. C. Lampreys.

About a year after the discovery, Smythe wrote an account in which he included both a sketch and plan of the chamber. Smythe's original report was not published at the time, but deposited in the archive of Maidstone Museum. In this unpublished document, he referred to the monument as a "British Tomb" or a "Druidical Monument". The document was only published in 1948, in an article written for the Archaeologia Cantiana journal by the archaeologist John H. Evans. Evans noted that "meagre and incomplete as it is", "we must be grateful" for this document "when we remember the unrecorded destruction wrought throughout the centuries upon this interesting and isolated megalithic necropolis".

Alongside Smythe's report, a second brief account was produced and placed in the museum, likely written by Charles and again published in Evans' 1948 article. Ashbee later related that both of the reports written in the 1820s were "brief but valuable" and "in many ways in advance of their age". He noted that the destruction of prehistoric monuments during this "age of agricultural development" would have been quite commonplace and thus these antiquarians' records—written "almost half a century before the emergence of the outlines of present-day prehistory" as a field of scholarly study—were particularly important.

In the 1920s, the archaeologist O. G. S. Crawford accessed the Maidstone Museum archives to determine the probable location of Smythe's Megalith. He then included the site in his 1924 Ordnance Survey guide to archaeological sites in southeastern England. In 1955, several substantial stones were also found in the area. In 2000, Ashbee stated that some of the kerbstones had "recently come to light, buried in the ditches" of the monument.
