= Addington Long Barrow =

Chambered long barrow in Kent, England

Coordinates: 51.307913°N 0.370144°E

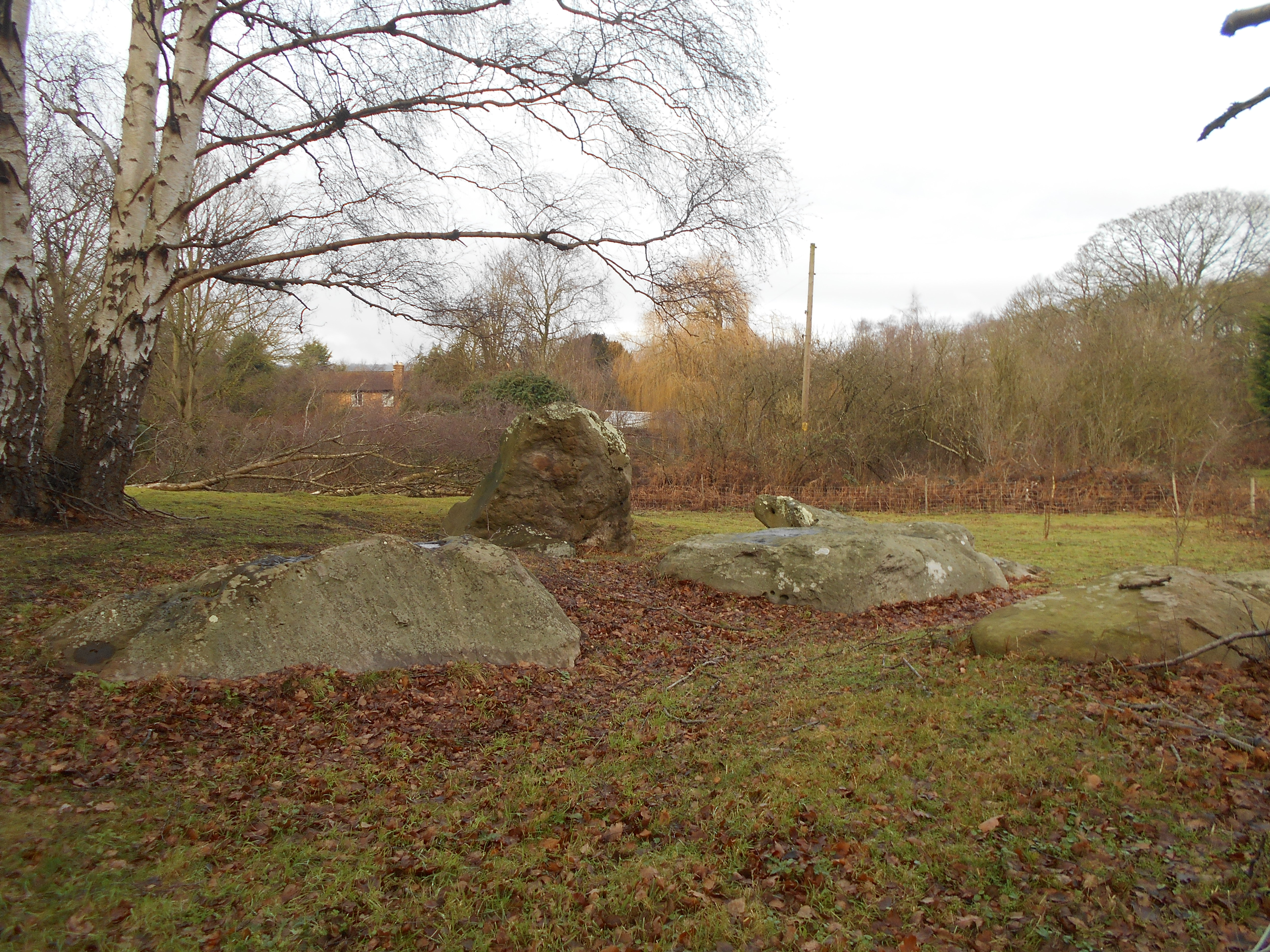
- View of the damaged burial chamber

- Location within Kent
- Location: Addington, Kent
- Type: Long barrow

Addington Long Barrow is a chambered long barrow located near the village of Addington in the southeastern English county of Kent. Probably constructed in the fourth millennium BCE, during Britain's Early Neolithic period, today it survives only in a ruined state. Built of earth and about fifty megaliths of local sarsen, the long barrow consisted of a sub-rectangular earthen tumulus enclosed by kerb-stones. Collapsed stones on the northeastern end of the chamber probably once formed a stone chamber in which human remains might have been deposited, though none have been discovered.

Archaeologists have established that the monument was built by pastoralist communities shortly after the introduction of agriculture to Britain from continental Europe. Although representing part of an architectural tradition of long barrow building that was widespread across Neolithic Europe, Addington Long Barrow belongs to a localised regional variant of barrows produced in the vicinity of the River Medway, now known as the Medway Megaliths. Of these, it lies near to both Chestnuts Long Barrow and Coldrum Long Barrow on the western side of the river. Two further surviving long barrows, Kit's Coty House and Little Kit's Coty House, as well as the destroyed Smythe's Megalith and possible survivals such as the Coffin Stone and White Horse Stone, are located on the Medway's eastern side.

After the Early Neolithic, the long barrow fell into ruins, with a small road being built through the centre of the monument by the 19th century at the latest. Local folklore grew up around the site, associating it with the countless stones motif. The ruin attracted the interest of antiquarians in the early 18th century, and was studied by local archaeologists in the 20th. Both it and the nearby Chestnuts Long Barrow are on private land and are no longer (as of October 2019) accessible to the public.

== Location ==
The monument lies approximately 250 metres (820 ft) north of Addington Parish Church. It is accessible from the A20 via two minor roads. The area in which the barrow is located is sometimes termed Addington Park. The site is privately owned, although it is visible from a road that cuts through the middle of the barrow. Geologically, it is located on the Lower Greensand.

== Context ==
The Early Neolithic was a revolutionary period of British history. Between 4500 and 3800 BCE, it saw a widespread change in lifestyle as the communities living in the British Isles adopted agriculture as their primary form of subsistence, abandoning the hunter-gatherer lifestyle that had characterised the preceding Mesolithic period. The change came about through contact with continental European societies, although it is unclear to what extent this can be attributed to an influx of migrants or to indigenous Mesolithic Britons adopting agricultural technologies from the continent. The region of modern Kent would have been key for the arrival of continental European settlers and visitors, because of its position on the estuary of the River Thames and its proximity to the continent.

Britain was then largely forested; widespread forest clearance did not occur in Kent until the Late Bronze Age (c.1000 to 700 BCE). Environmental data from the vicinity of the White Horse Stone, a putatively prehistoric monolith near the River Medway, supports the idea that the area was still largely forested in the Early Neolithic, covered by a woodland of oak, ash, hazel/alder and Amygdaloideae (stone-fruit trees). Throughout most of Britain, there is little evidence of cereal or permanent dwellings from this period, leading archaeologists to believe that the island's Early Neolithic economy was largely pastoral, relying on herding cattle, with people living a nomadic or semi-nomadic life.

=== Medway Megaliths ===
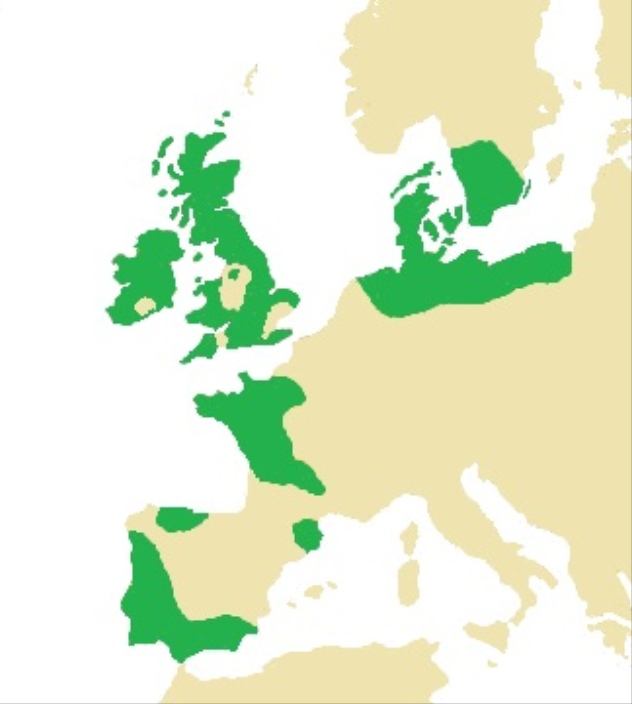
The construction of long barrows and related funerary monuments took place in various parts of Europe during the Early Neolithic (known distribution pictured)

Across Western Europe, the Early Neolithic marked the first period in which humans built monumental structures in the landscape. These structures included chambered long barrows: rectangular or oval earthen tumuli that had a chamber built into one end. Some of these chambers were constructed out of timber, while others were built using large stones, now known as "megaliths". These long barrows often served as tombs, housing the physical remains of the dead within their chamber. Individuals were rarely buried alone in the Early Neolithic, instead being interred in collective burials with other members of their community. These chambered tombs were built all along the Western European seaboard during the Early Neolithic, from southeastern Spain up to southern Sweden, including most of the British Isles; the architectural tradition was introduced to Britain from continental Europe in the first half of the fourth millennium BCE. While there are stone buildings—like Göbekli Tepe in modern Turkey—which predate them, the chambered long barrows constitute humanity's first widespread tradition of construction using stone.

Although now all in a ruinous state, at the time of construction the Medway Megaliths would have been some of the largest and most visually imposing Early Neolithic funerary monuments in Britain. Grouped along the River Medway as it cuts through the North Downs, they constitute the most southeasterly group of megalithic monuments in the British Isles, and the only megalithic group in eastern England. The Medway Megaliths can be divided into two clusters between 8 kilometres (5.0 miles) and 10 kilometres (6.2 miles) apart: one to the west of the River Medway and the other on Blue Bell Hill to the east. Addington Long Barrow is part of the western group, which also includes Coldrum Long Barrow and Chestnuts Long Barrow. The eastern group consists of Smythe's Megalith, Kit's Coty House, and Little Kit's Coty House, while various stones on the eastern side of the river, most notably the Coffin Stone and White Horse Stone, may also have been parts of such structures. It is not known if they were all built at the same time, or whether they were constructed in succession; nor is it known if they each served the same function or whether there was a hierarchy in their usage.

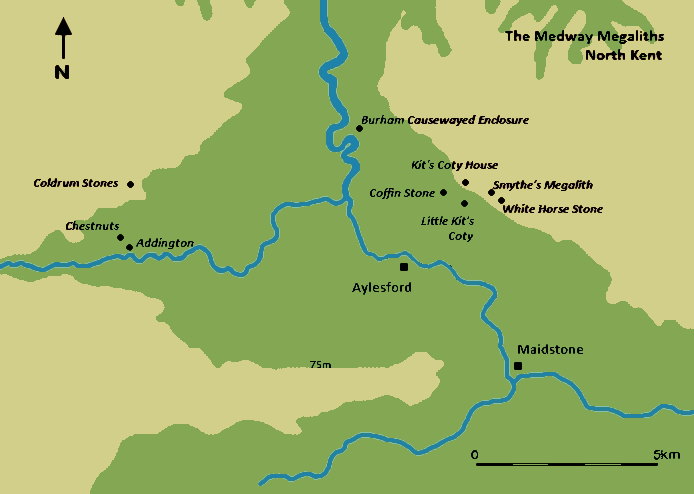
Map of the Medway Megaliths around the River Medway

The Medway long barrows all conformed to the same general design plan, and are all aligned on an east to west axis. Each had a stone chamber at the eastern end of the mound, and they each probably had a stone facade flanking the entrance. They had internal heights of up to 3.0 metres (10 feet), making them taller than most other chambered long barrows in Britain. The chambers were constructed from sarsen, a dense, hard, and durable stone that occurs naturally throughout Kent, having formed out of sand from the Eocene epoch. Early Neolithic builders would have selected blocks from the local area, and then transported them to the site of the monument to be erected.

These common architectural features among the Medway Megaliths indicate a strong regional cohesion with no direct parallels elsewhere in the British Isles. Nevertheless, as with other regional groupings of Early Neolithic long barrows—such as the Cotswold-Severn group in south-western Britain—there are also various idiosyncrasies in the different monuments, such as Coldrum's rectilinear shape, the Chestnut Long Barrow's facade, and the long, thin mounds at Addington and Kit's Coty. These variations might have been caused by the tombs being altered and adapted over the course of their use; in this scenario, the monuments would be composite structures.

The Medway Megaliths' builders were probably influenced by pre-existing tomb-shrines elsewhere that they were aware of. Whether the builders had grown up locally, or moved into the Medway area from elsewhere is not known. Based on a stylistic analysis of their architectural designs, the archaeologist Stuart Piggott thought that the plan behind the Medway Megaliths had originated in the area around the Low Countries, while fellow archaeologist Glyn Daniel believed that the same evidence showed an influence from Scandinavia. John H. Evans instead suggested an origin in Germany, and Ronald F. Jessup thought that their origins could be seen in the Cotswold-Severn megalithic group. Alexander thought their closest similarities were with long barrows along the Atlantic coast, perhaps imitating those of either Ireland or Brittany. The archaeologist Paul Ashbee noted that their close clustering in the same area was reminiscent of the megalithic tomb-shrine traditions of continental Northern Europe, and emphasised that the Medway Megaliths were a regional manifestation of a tradition widespread across Early Neolithic Europe. He nevertheless stressed that a precise place of origin was "impossible to indicate" with the available evidence.

== Design and construction ==
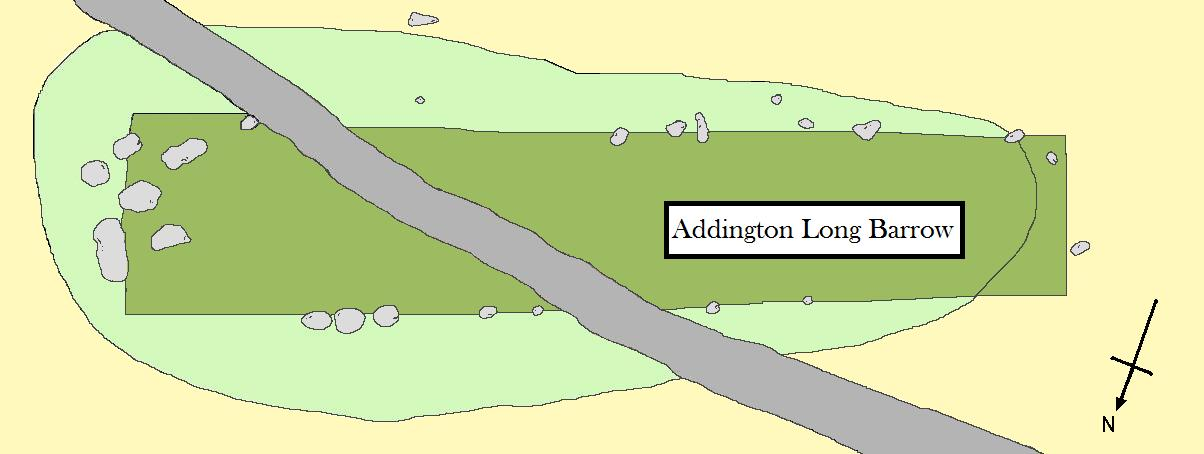
Plan of the monument.

Rectangular in shape, Addington Long Barrow is on a northeast to southwest alignment. In 1950, Evans described the monument as having twenty-two sarsen stones, eight of which, at the northeast end, would have originally formed the burial chamber. In 1981, investigators from Kent Archaeological Rescue Unit expanded that number, identifying twenty-five sarsens in the monument. Given the dimensions of the chambered tomb, they suggested that it probably once included about fifty stones.

Upon construction, the barrow would have been about 60 metres (200 ft) long. The sides would have been straight but the monument tapered in width from 14 metres (46 ft) at its eastern end to 11 metres (36 ft) at its western end. It thus formed a "truncated wedge-shape". The earthen tumulus currently stands at about 1 metre (3 ft 3 in) in height, although would have been much taller when first created. Evans described the tumulus as having been "of immense size", believing that the long barrow would have been "a most imposing structure" when built. No evidence has been found of ditches formed by quarrying for the earth to form the mound.

A stone chamber was set within the northeastern end of the long barrow, although it had been pulled down at some point in the monument's history, while much of the mound was left standing. Jessup suggested that this chamber had been a false portal, an architectural feature resembling a doorway but which does not allow entry to the tomb, an idea supported by Daniel.

=== Meaning and purpose ===
Britain's Early Neolithic communities placed greater emphasis on the ritual burial of the dead than their Mesolithic forebears. Archaeologists have suggested that this is because Early Neolithic Britons adhered to an ancestor cult that venerated the spirits of the dead, believing that they could intercede with the forces of nature for the benefit of their living descendants. The archaeologist Robin Holgate stressed that rather than simply being tombs, the Medway Megaliths were "communal monuments fulfilling a social function for the communities who built and used them". Thus, it has been suggested that Early Neolithic people entered the tombs—which doubled as temples or shrines—to perform rituals honouring the dead and requesting their assistance. For this reason, the historian Ronald Hutton termed these monuments "tomb-shrines" to reflect their dual purpose.

In Britain, these tombs were typically located on prominent hills and slopes overlooking the landscape, perhaps at the junction between different territories. The archaeologist Caroline Malone noted that the tombs would have served as one of various landscape markers that conveyed information on "territory, political allegiance, ownership, and ancestors". Many archaeologists have subscribed to the idea that these tomb-shrines were territorial markers between different tribes; others have argued that such markers would be of little use to a nomadic herding society. Instead it has been suggested that they represent markers along herding pathways. The archaeologist Richard Bradley suggested that the construction of these monuments reflects an attempt to mark control and ownership over the land, thus reflecting a change in mindset brought about by the transition from the hunter-gatherer Mesolithic to the pastoralist Early Neolithic. Others have suggested that these monuments were built on sites already deemed sacred by Mesolithic hunter-gatherers.

== Later history ==
=== Destruction ===
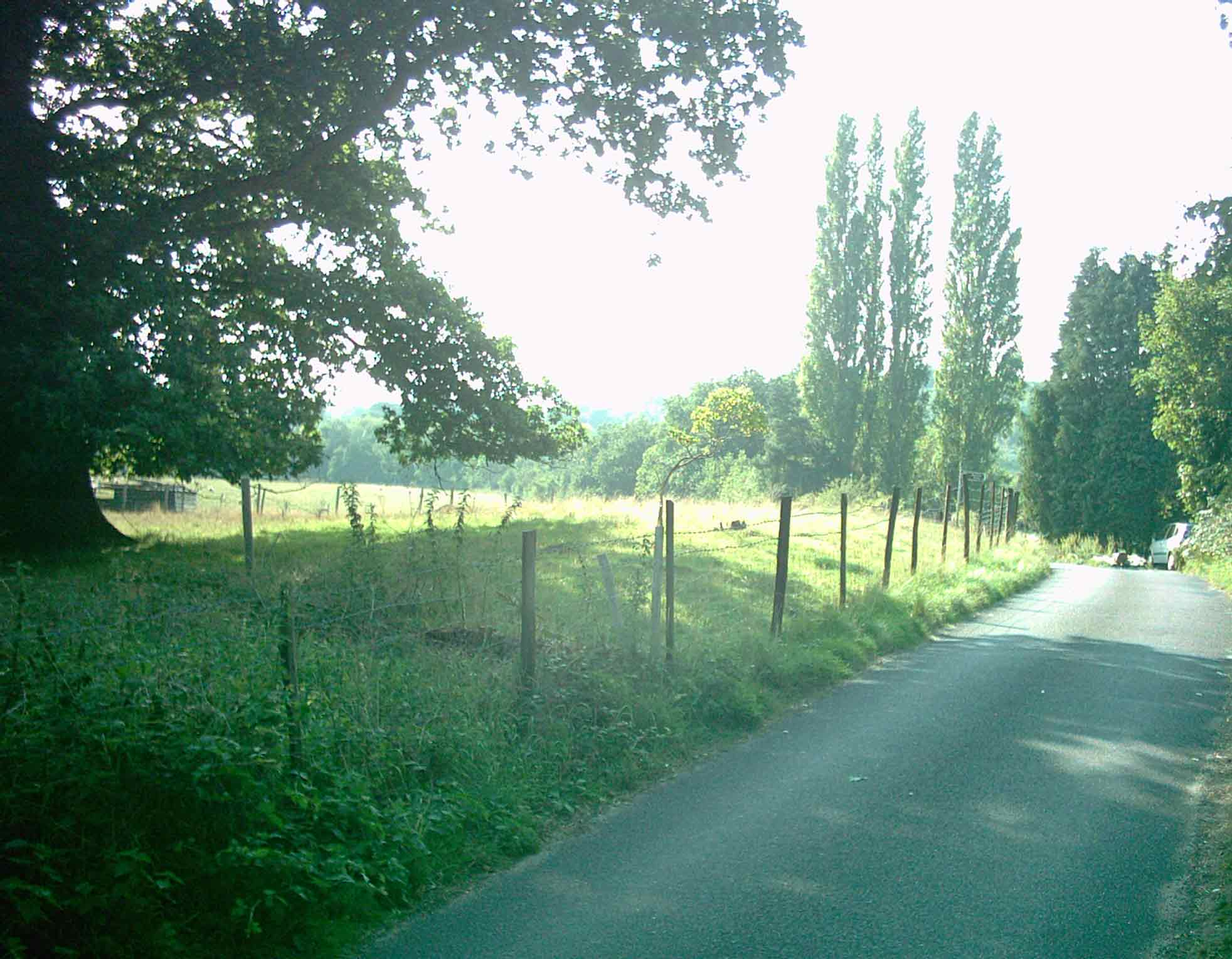
West-facing view of the remnant barrow, which extends away from the camera on the left-hand side of the road between the fence and the tree

All the surviving megalithic tombs from the Early Neolithic period have suffered from neglect and the ravages of agriculture. Following the demolition of the tomb's chamber, some of the sarsens around Addington Long Barrow had been buried, while others had been left visible. Various buildings in Addington are partly made of sarsen stone, some perhaps removed from the long barrow. Ashbee also suspected that sarsens from the monument had been broken up for use in the repairs and extensions to the local church in the nineteenth century. The barrow was further damaged by the construction of the small road running through the middle of it.

Claims that people in the Middle Ages deliberately dug into and damaged the long barrows have been made for other Medway Megaliths, including Smythe's Megalith, Chestnuts Long Barrow, Lower Kit's Coty House, Kit's Coty House, Coldrum Long Barrow, and Addington Long Barrow. Ashbee suggested that this destruction was probably due to iconoclasm, believing that the burial of the stones likely indicated that medieval Christian zealots had tried to deliberately destroy and defame the pre-Christian monument.

Conversely, the archaeologist John Alexander believed that this damage resulted from a robbery by medieval treasure hunters. Supporting this idea is comparative evidence, with the Close Roll of 1237 ordering the opening of barrows on the Isle of Wight in search for treasure, a practice that may have spread to Kent around the same time. Alexander believed that the destruction may have been brought about by a special commissioner, highlighting that the "expertness and thoroughness of the robbery"—as evidenced at Chestnuts—would have necessitated resources beyond that which a local community could likely produce.

=== Folklore and folk tradition ===
When Thomas Wright investigated the site in about 1850, he was aided by a local man who believed that a crock of gold would be unearthed there.

In a 1946 paper published in the Folklore journal, John H. Evans recorded a Kentish folk belief which had been widespread "Up to the last generation"; this was that it was impossible for any human being to successfully count the number of stones in the Medway Megaliths. The countless stones motif is not unique to Kent but has been recorded at other megalithic monuments in Britain and Ireland. The earliest textual evidence for it is found in an early 16th-century document, where it applies to Stonehenge in Wiltshire, although an early 17th-century document also applied it to The Hurlers, a set of three stone circles in Cornwall. Later records reveal that it had gained widespread distribution in England, as well as a single occurrence each in Wales and Ireland. The folklorist S. P. Menefee suggested that it could be attributed to an animistic understanding that these megaliths had lives of their own.

== Antiquarian and archaeological investigation ==
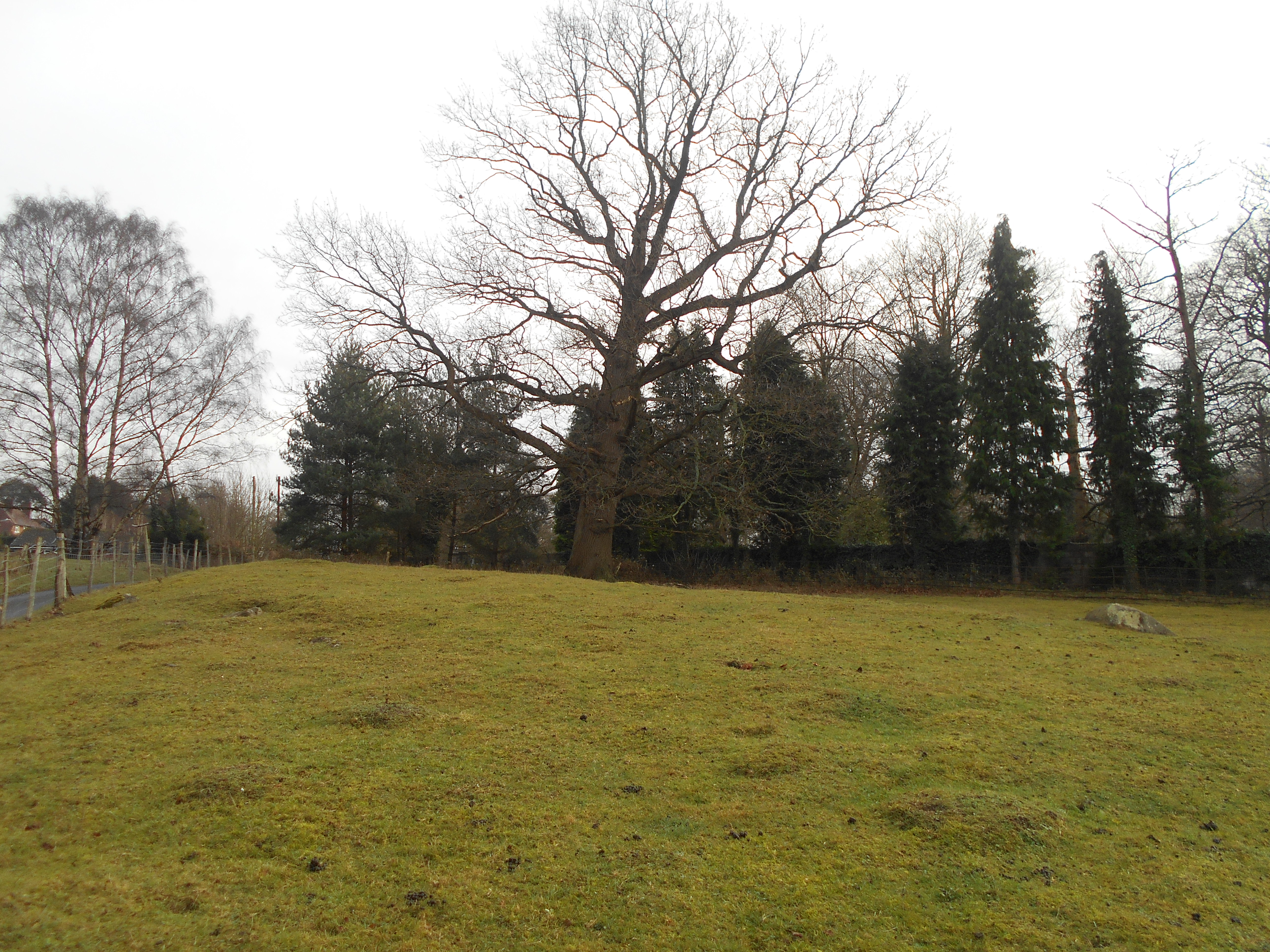
The barrow survives on the south side of the road as a low mound with small sarsens

The antiquarian John Harris mentioned Addington Long Barow in his History of Kent, published posthumously in 1719. He noted that the area where the barrow stood was known locally as "the Warren", and that an "old clerk" informed him that an oak tree had formerly grown in the centre of the stones. The monument was next recorded by the antiquarian Josiah Colebrooke in a short article for Archaeologia, the journal of the Society of Antiquaries of London, in 1773. Aided by the minister of the parish, the Reverend Buttonshaw, Colebooke enquired among elderly locals as to whether they knew of the oak tree mentioned by Harris, but none had. Colebrooke believed that the Britons had retreated to near Addington after their defeat at the fifth-century Battle of Aylesford, and that it was here that they buried their military leader, Categern. The later archaeologist John H. Evans described Colebrooke's descriptions and drawings as "almost completely worthless" because the antiquarian mistook the rectangular chambered tomb for a stone circle. Colebrook's analysis was echoed in the 18th-century writings of Samuel Pegge, Edward Hasted, and John Thorpe.

In 1827, the road passing through the tomb was widened and deepened. To achieve this, workmen removed two of the sarsens from the revetment kerb and placed them in the corner of the wood to the south of the monument. In the early 1840s, the Reverend Beale Post conducted investigations into the Medway Megaliths, writing them up in a manuscript that was left unpublished; this included Addington Long Barrow and Chestnuts Long Barrow, which he collectively labelled the "Addington Circles". Thomas Wright recorded that in 1845 a local parson, the Reverend Lambert Blackwell Larking, dug into a chamber at Addington, discovering "fragments of rude pottery". From the context in which Wright wrote, it seems that Addington Long Barrow is referred to, although it remains possible that Chestnuts was the barrow in question. In the early 1860s, Charles Roach Smith visited the site alongside Charles Warne and Charles Moore Jessop, the latter of whom described it as a "Celtic" monument in a subsequent article for Gentleman's Magazine.

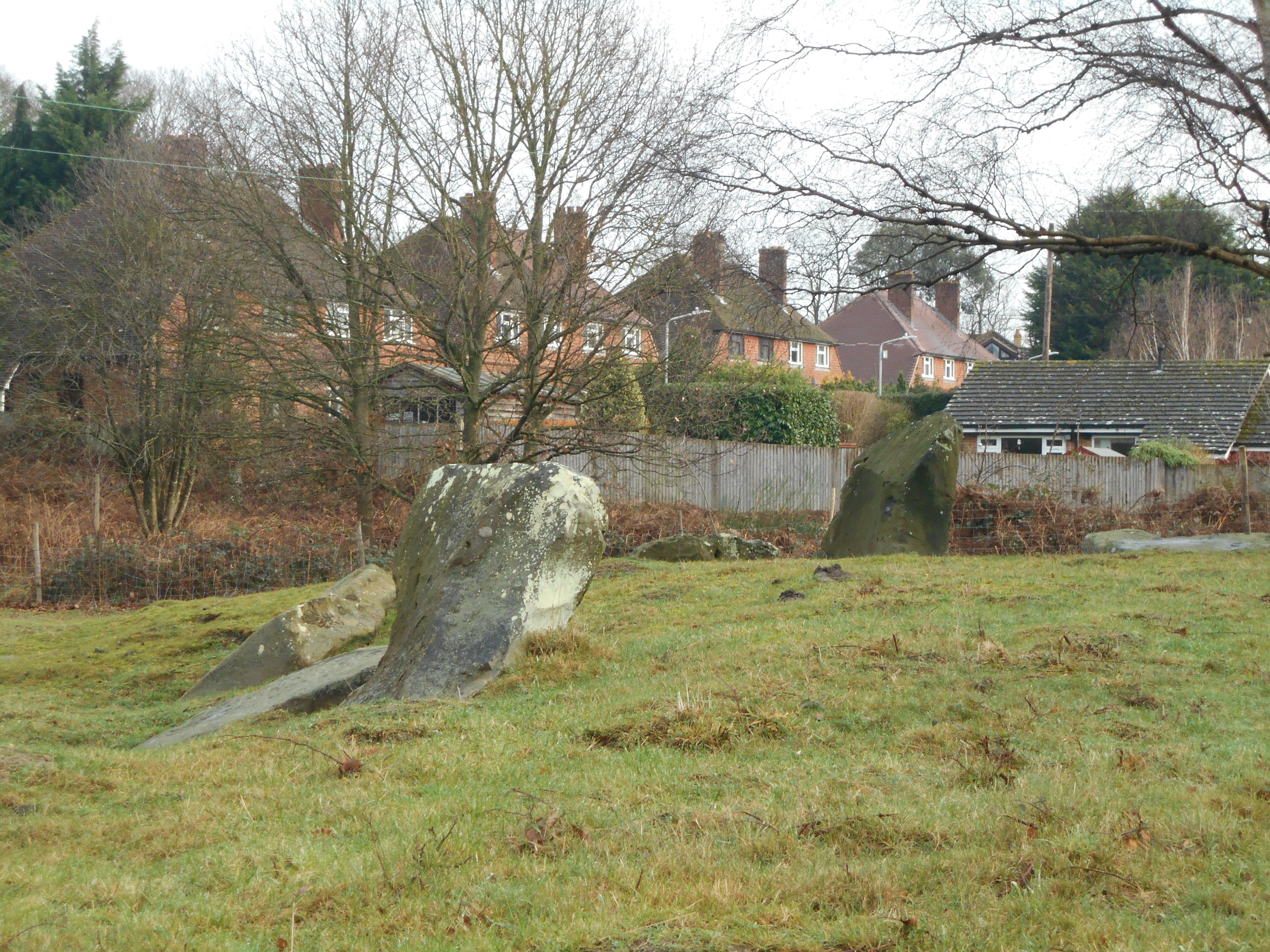
Stones from the chamber of the Addington Long Barrow

In 1871, Edwin Dunkin published a basic plan of the monument, noting that there were similar chambered tombs around Britain. In 1880, the archaeologist Flinders Petrie included the Addington stones in his list of Kentish earthworks; he commented that "with extraordinary perversity [they] have been hitherto described as forming a circle, though they appear to be very plainly in two lines". He published a small, basic plan of the monument. The barrow then received a mention in George Payne's Collectanea Cantiana, published in 1893. Payne noted a folk tradition that stone avenues connected Coldrum to the Addington Long Barrow, although he commented that he was unable to discover any evidence of this feature. The earliest published photographs of the monument, taken by George Clinch, appeared in a 1908 volume of the Victoria County History series. In his 1924 publication dealing with Kent, the archaeologist O. G. S. Crawford, then working as the archaeological officer for the Ordnance Survey, listed the Addington Long Barrow alongside the other Medway Megaliths.

Ronald Jessup included the Addington site in his 1970 book, South East England, there describing it as "mostly overgrown". In 1981, members of the Kent Archaeological Rescue Unit conducted a measured survey of the monument. In 2005, Ashbee noted that he had found evidence of recent metal detectoring activity at the site. In May 2007, the archaeologist Brian Philp was conducting his regular inspection of the monument when the current landowner pointed out to him an area where the road was subsiding. Philp alerted Kent County Council, who arranged for contractors to investigate the reason for the subsidence, which proved to be decades of rabbit burrowing beneath the tarmac. Archaeologists from Kent Archaeological Unit visited the site during the work, discovering a buried sarsen. Comparison with older records revealed that this stone had once been upright but had been buried where it stood in the 19th century by workmen who were replacing the trackway with a paved road.
