= Cossington =

Cossington is the name of:

In Australia

- Cossington (Turramurra), a heritage-listed house in the Sydney suburb of Turramurra

In England

- Cossington, Kent, a small settlement in Kent, home of a possible megalithic site
- Cossington, Leicestershire, a village in the Soar Valley in Leicestershire
- Cossington, Somerset, a village on the Polden Hills between Bridgwater and Street in Somerset
