= Coffin Stone =

Archaeological artifact in Kent, England

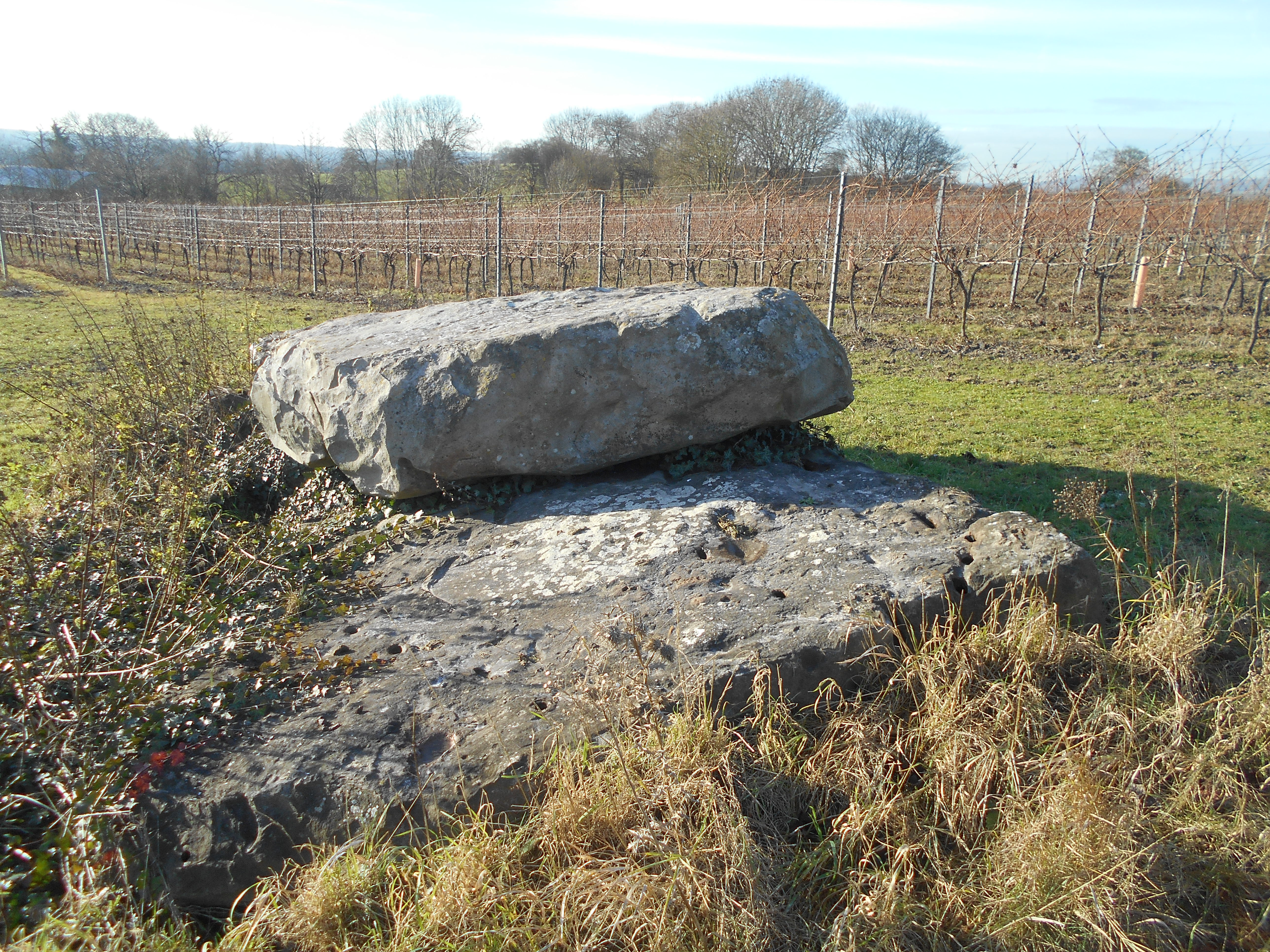
- The site in 2017. The topmost stone was placed there by a farmer, and the Coffin Stone is beneath

- Location within Kent
- 51.317806°N 0.495659°E
- Type: Monolith; putative long barrow

The Coffin Stone, also known as the Coffin and the Table Stone, is a large sarsen stone at the foot of Blue Bell Hill near Aylesford in the south-eastern English county of Kent. Now lying horizontally, the stone probably once stood upright nearby. Various archaeologists have argued that the stone was part of a now-destroyed chambered long barrow constructed in the fourth millennium BCE, during Britain's Early Neolithic period.

If a chambered long barrow did indeed previously exist on the site, it would have been built by pastoralist communities shortly after the introduction of agriculture to Britain from continental Europe. Long-barrow building was an architectural tradition widespread across Neolithic Europe. It consisted of various localized regional variants; one of these was in the vicinity of the River Medway, examples of which are now known as the Medway Megaliths. The Coffin Stone lies on the eastern side of the river, not far from the chambered long barrows of Little Kit's Coty House, Kit's Coty House, and the (now destroyed) Smythe's Megalith. Three other examples, the Coldrum Long Barrow, Addington Long Barrow, and Chestnuts Long Barrow, remain on the western side of the river.

The Coffin Stone is a rectangular slab lying flat that measures 4.42 metres (14 ft 6 in) in length, 2.59 metres (8 ft 6 in) in breadth, and about 0.61 metres (2 ft) in width. Two smaller stones lie nearby and another large slab is now located atop it. In the 1830s it was reported that local farmers found human bones near the stone. An archaeological excavation of the site led by Paul Garwood took place in 2008–09; it found that the megalith was placed in its present location only in the 15th or 16th centuries. The archaeologists found no evidence of a chambered long barrow at the location, and suggested that the Coffin Stone might once have stood upright in the vicinity.

== Location ==
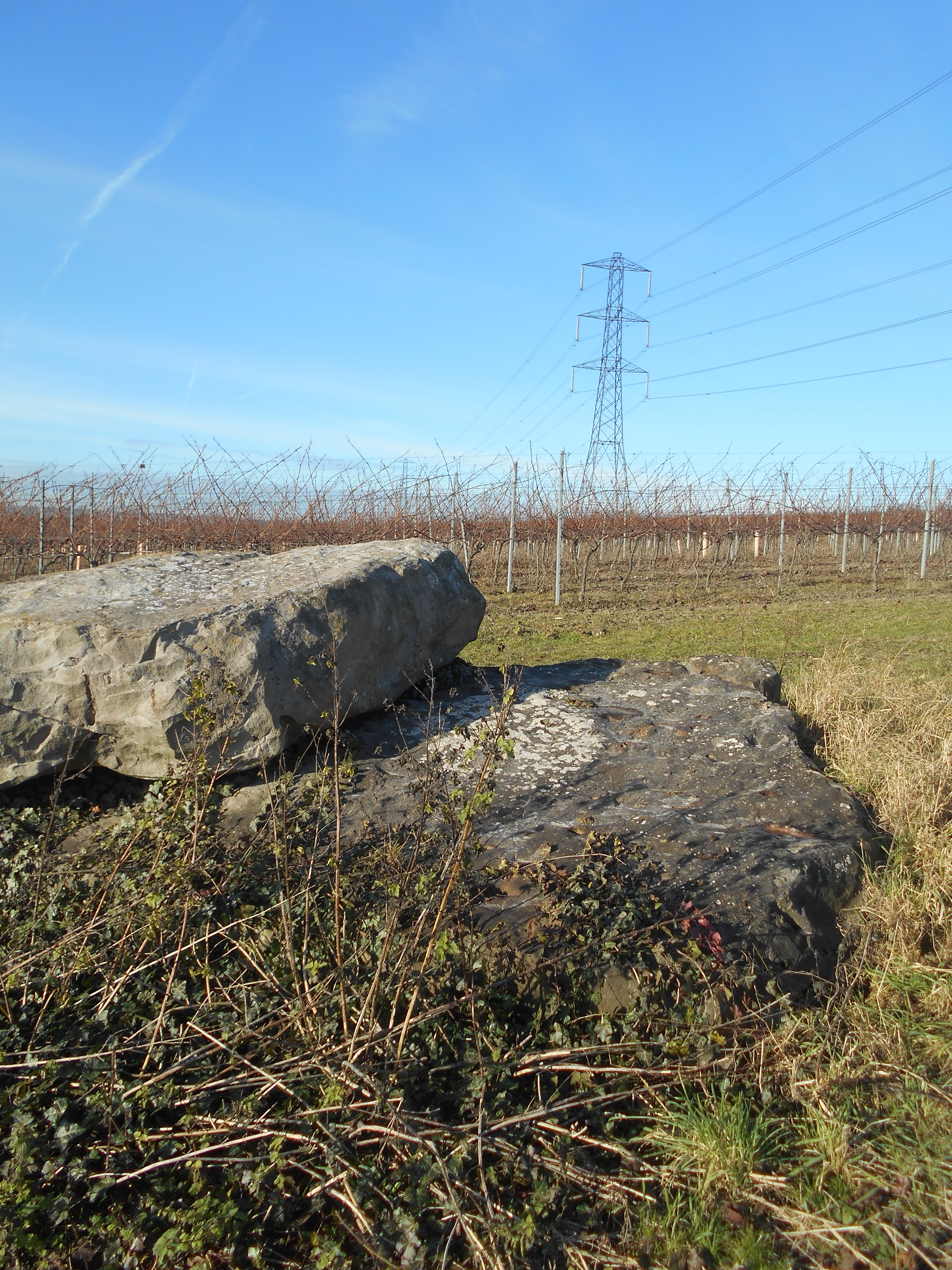
The Coffin Stone in a vineyard

The Coffin Stone is in Great Tottington Farm, which is now used as a vineyard. As of 2005, the site was not signposted, but could be reached via a stile along the Pilgrims' Way. The Coffin Stone is situated about 400 metres (1,300 ft) north-west of Little Kit's Coty House. It is also a short distance north of the Tottington springhead.

== Context ==
The Early Neolithic was a revolutionary period of British history. Between 4500 and 3800 BCE, it saw a widespread change in lifestyle as the communities living in the British Isles adopted agriculture as their primary form of subsistence, abandoning the hunter-gatherer lifestyle that had characterised the preceding Mesolithic period. This came about through contact with continental societies; it is unclear to what extent this can be attributed to an influx of migrants or to indigenous Mesolithic Britons adopting agricultural technologies from continental Europe. The region of modern Kent was a key area for the arrival of continental settlers and visitors, because of its position on the estuary of the River Thames and its proximity to the continent.

Britain was largely forested in this period; widespread forest clearance did not occur in Kent until the Late Bronze Age (c.1000 to 700 BCE). Environmental data from the vicinity of the White Horse Stone, a putatively prehistoric monolith near the River Medway, supports the idea that the area was still largely forested in the Early Neolithic, covered by a woodland of oak, ash, hazel/alder and Maloideae (apples and their allies). Throughout most of Britain, there is little evidence of cereal grain farming or permanent dwellings from this period, leading archaeologists to believe that the Early Neolithic economy on the island was largely pastoral, relying on herding cattle, with people living a nomadic or semi-nomadic life.

=== Medway Megaliths ===
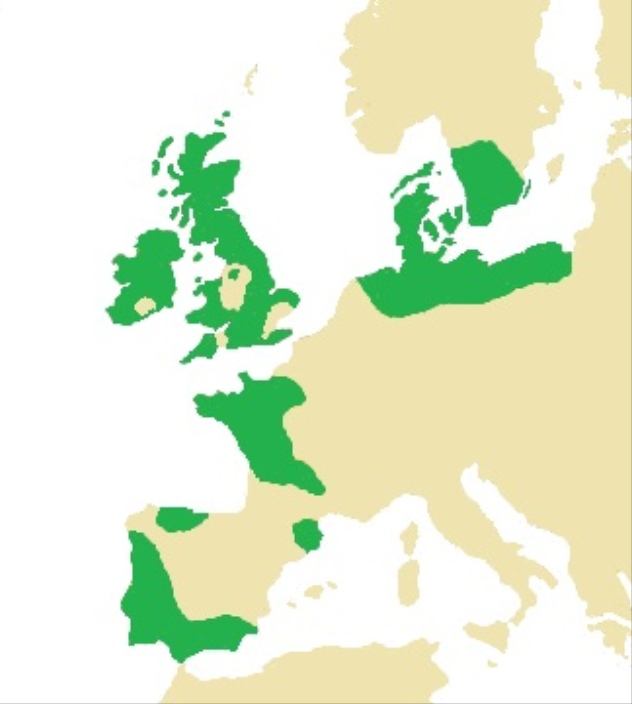
The construction of long barrows and related funerary monuments took place in various parts of Europe during the Early Neolithic.

Across Western Europe, the Early Neolithic marked the first period in which humans built monumental structures. These included chambered long barrows, rectangular or oval earthen tumuli that had a chamber built into one end. Some of these chambers were constructed out of timber, and others were built using large stones, now known as "megaliths". Long barrows often served as tombs, housing the physical remains of the dead within their chamber. Individuals were rarely buried alone in the Early Neolithic, instead being interred in collective burials with other members of their community. Chambered tombs were built all along the Western European seaboard during the Early Neolithic, from southeastern Spain to southern Sweden, taking in most of the British Isles; the architectural tradition was introduced to Britain from continental Europe in the first half of the fourth millennium BCE. There are stone buildings—like Göbekli Tepe in modern Turkey—that predate them, but the chambered long barrows constitute humanity's first widespread tradition of construction using stone.

Although now all in a ruinous state and not retaining their original appearance, at the time of construction the Medway Megaliths would have been some of the largest and most visually imposing Early Neolithic funerary monuments in Britain. Grouped along the River Medway as it cuts through the North Downs, they constitute the most southeasterly group of megalithic monuments in the British Isles, and the only megalithic group in eastern England. The archaeologists Brian Philp and Mike Dutto deemed the Medway Megaliths to be "some of the most interesting and well known" archaeological sites in Kent, while the archaeologist Paul Ashbee described them as "the most grandiose and impressive structures of their kind in southern England".

The Medway Megaliths can be divided into two separate clusters: one to the west of the River Medway and the other on Blue Bell Hill to the east, between 8 and 10 kilometres (5.0 and 6.2 mi) apart. The western group includes Coldrum Long Barrow, Addington Long Barrow, and the Chestnuts Long Barrow. The eastern group consists of Smythe's Megalith, Kit's Coty House, Little Kit's Coty House, and several other stones that might have once been parts of chambered tombs, most notably the White Horse Stone. It is not known if they were all built at the same time, and it is not known if they each served the same function or whether there was a hierarchy in their usage.

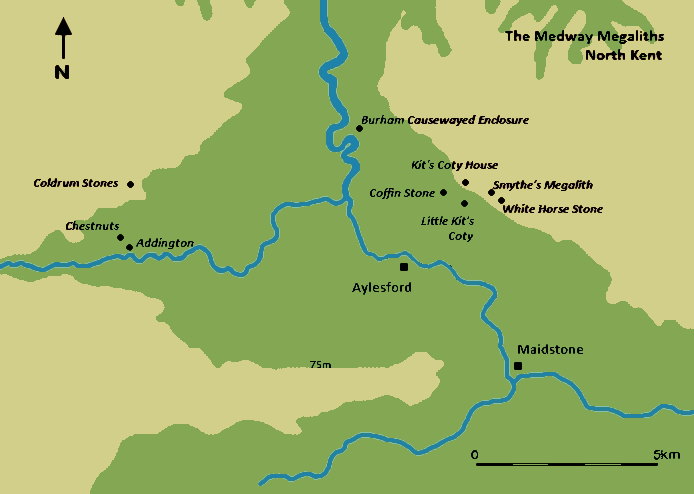
Map of the Medway Megaliths around the River Medway

The Medway long barrows all conformed to the same general design plan, and are all aligned on an east to west axis. Each had a stone chamber at the eastern end of the mound, and they each probably had a stone facade flanking the entrance. They had internal heights of up to 3.0 metres (10 feet), making them taller than most other chambered long barrows in Britain. The chambers were constructed from sarsen sandstone, a dense, hard, and durable stone that occurs naturally throughout Kent, having formed out of sand from the Eocene epoch. Early Neolithic builders would have selected blocks from the local area, and then transported them to the site of the monument to be erected.

These common architectural features among the Medway Megaliths indicate a strong regional cohesion with no direct parallels elsewhere in the British Isles. Nevertheless, as with other regional groupings of Early Neolithic long barrows—such as the Cotswold-Severn group in south-western Britain—there are also various idiosyncrasies in the different monuments, such as Coldrum's rectilinear shape, the Chestnut Long Barrow's facade, and the long, thin mounds at Addington and Kit's Coty. These variations might have been caused by the tombs being altered and adapted over the course of their use; in this scenario, the monuments would be composite structures.

The builders of these monuments were probably influenced by pre-existing tomb-shrines they were aware of. Whether those people had grown up locally, or moved into the Medway area from elsewhere is not known. Based on a stylistic analysis of their architecture, the archaeologist Stuart Piggott thought that the plan behind the Medway Megaliths had originated in the area around the Low Countries; Glyn Daniel thought their design derived from Scandinavia, John H. Evans thought Germany, and Ronald F. Jessup suggested an influence from the Cotswold-Severn group. Ashbee found their close clustering reminiscent of the megalithic tomb-shrine traditions of continental Northern Europe, and emphasised that the Medway Megaliths were a regional manifestation of a tradition widespread across Early Neolithic Europe. He concluded that a precise place of origin was "impossible to indicate" with the available evidence.

== Description ==
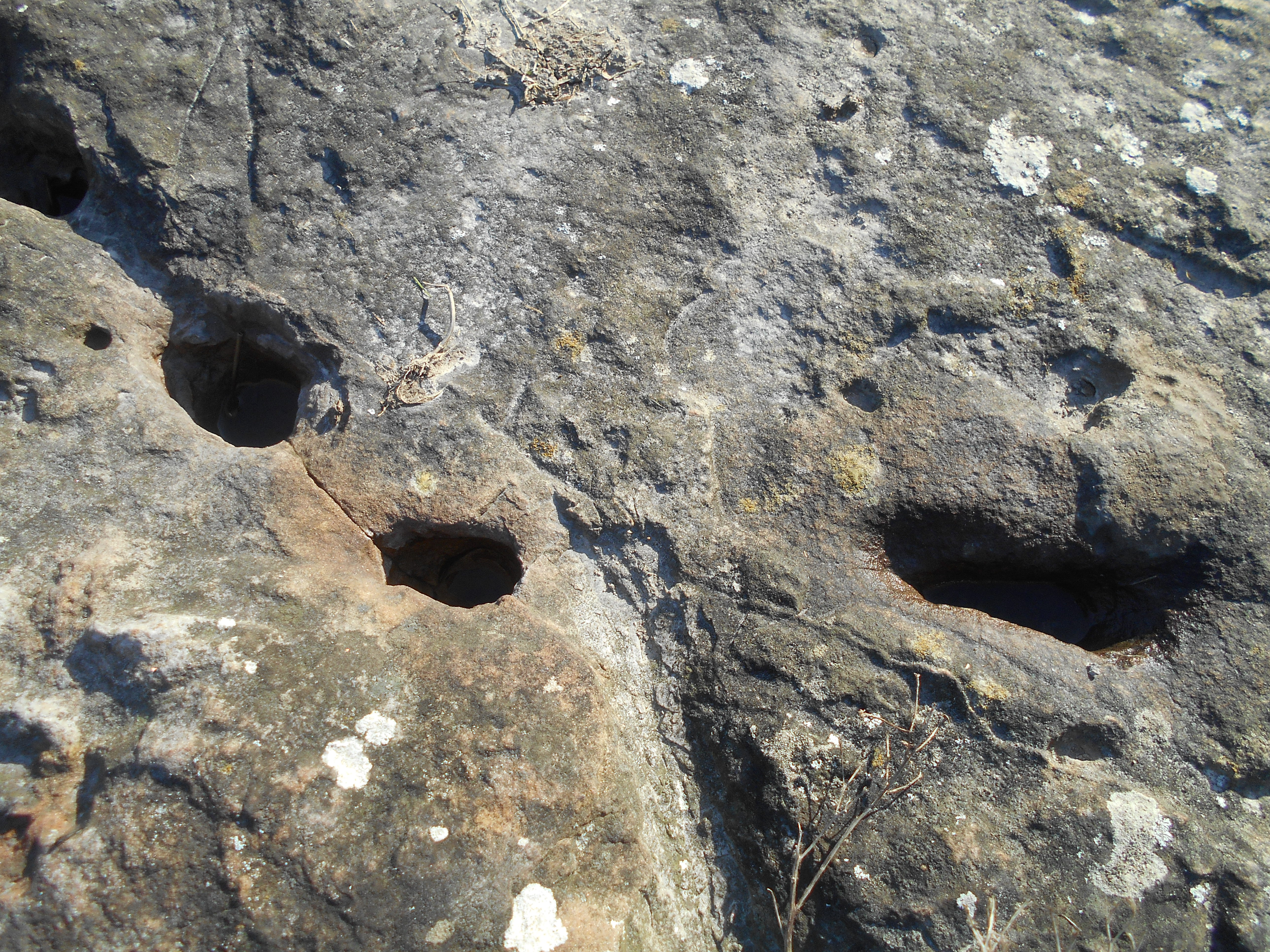
Detail of weathering on the Coffin Stone

The Coffin Stone is a large rectangular slab. In the 1870s, it was measured as being 4.42 metres (14 ft 6 in) in length, 2.59 metres (8 ft 6 in) in breadth, and about 0.61 metres (2 ft) in width. (Note: The placement of a large slab atop the Coffin Stone has hindered the production of accurate later measurements. In 2006, Philp and Dutto could only suggest that it was "about 4.40m by 2.80m by at least 50 cm" in size.) The archaeologist Timothy Champion suggested that "the Coffin Stone" was "an appropriate name" for the megalith given its appearance. Given the size of the megalith, it is likely that—had this been part of a chamber—the chamber could have measured as much as 3.75 metres (12.3 ft) in height and would have been the largest of all the known Medway Megaliths. There may have been a stone façade in front of the chamber, and if so, these may be the stones now found in the Tottington's western springhead. At some point in the twentieth century, another large sarsen slab was placed on top of the Coffin Stone.

In Evans' view, the nineteenth-century discovery of human remains at the site "strongly suggests" that the Coffin Stone was the remnant of a destroyed chambered long barrow. Jessup agreed, suggesting that "in all probability" it was part of such a monument. Some archaeologists have argued that evidence of a barrow could be visibly identified; Ashbee noted that a mound was visible "in much reduced form until the 1950s but can today [2005] hardly be traced". In 2007, Champion noted that the trace of the mound could still be seen. Had this once been a long barrow then it may have been flanked by kerbstones; various stones found nearby may have once been these. Had there been a barrow, it is likely that ditches would have flanked its sides. Archaeological investigation in the 2000s found no clear evidence of a chambered long barrow having stood on the site.

== Antiquarian and archaeological investigation ==
=== Antiquarian descriptions ===
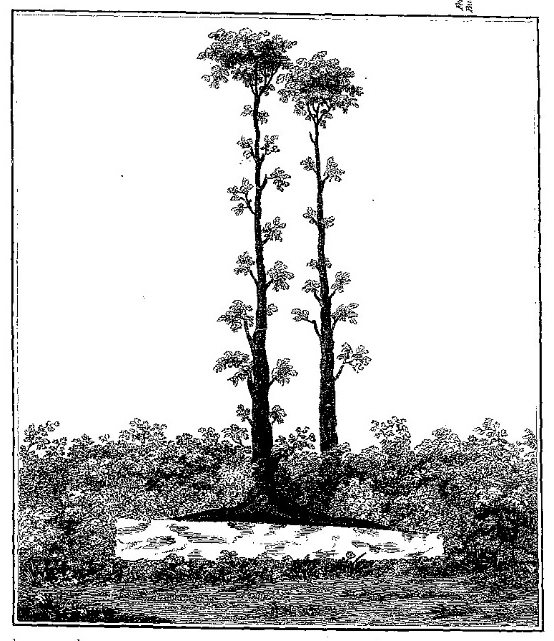
Illustration of the Coffin Stone with a tree growing over it; published in John Thorpe's 1788 book Custumale Roffense

The antiquarian William Stukeley made note of the Coffin Stone in his posthumously published 1776 work Itinerarium Curiosum. This book contained the first published illustration of the monument. Stukeley had been alerted to the site by his friend Hercules Ayleway, who in a 1722 letter told Stukeley of "a large stone 15-foot long, called the coffin". The site was next described by John Thorpe in his 1788 book Custumale Roffense; he believed that it was Stukeley himself who had given it the name of the "coffin stone". Thorpe visited the site and provided two illustrations of it; one of these showed a spindly tree growing from around the stone.

Circa 1840, the antiquarian Beale Poste visited the site and drew a sketch of it. In his unpublished manuscript on Kentish antiquities, he reported that in 1838 or 1839 a sack full of human remains had been recovered close to the Coffin Stone. In 1871, E. H. W. Dunkin provided an account of the site in The Reliquary. He related that as well as being known as "The Coffin", it was also called "The Table Stone". He believed that it had once stood upright on that same spot, representing "a sepulchral memorial or mênhir of some ancient British chieftain". Dunkin recorded that human remains—including two human skulls, other bones, and charcoal—had been found nearby during the 1836 removal of a hedge that "concealed more than one-half of the stone". He also noted that fragments of Roman pottery had been found nearby, and that local farmers had been moving sarsen blocks to the adjacent springhead; "more than fifty blocks, large and small, lie about the yard". In 1872, James Fergusson referenced the site in his Rude Stone Monuments in All Countries; Their Age and Uses, referring to the presence of "two obelisks, known to country people as the coffin-stones—probably from their shape".

In 1893, the antiquarian George Payne described the monument in his Collectanea Cantiana, noting that locally it was known as both the Coffin Stone and the General's Stone. Ashbee later suggested that Payne was actually confusing the Coffin Stone with the General's Stone, which was a separate megalith found several hundred metres away, in the same field as Kit's Coty House. In his 1924 publication dealing with Kent, the archaeologist O. G. S. Crawford, then working as the archaeological officer for the Ordnance Survey, listed the Coffin Stone alongside the other Medway Megaliths. In his 1927 book In Kentish Pilgrimland, William Coles Finch included a plate of the Coffin Stone; the photograph featured his son standing on it and shows various broken sarsens piled up at the monument's eastern end. Finch's plate was the first published photograph of the megalith, and was likely also the last published depiction of it before another large sarsen was placed over it. Finch measured the sarsen and found it to be wider than Thorpe had reported, also making note of plough damage and breakages. In a 1946 article on the folklore involving the Medway Megaliths, Evans noted that the Coffin Stone, like several other megalithic features in the area, was associated with a burial following the fifth-century Battle of Aylesford. The idea that one or more of these monuments had been linked to the battle was first mooted by early modern antiquarians, before entering local folklore.

=== Archaeological investigation ===
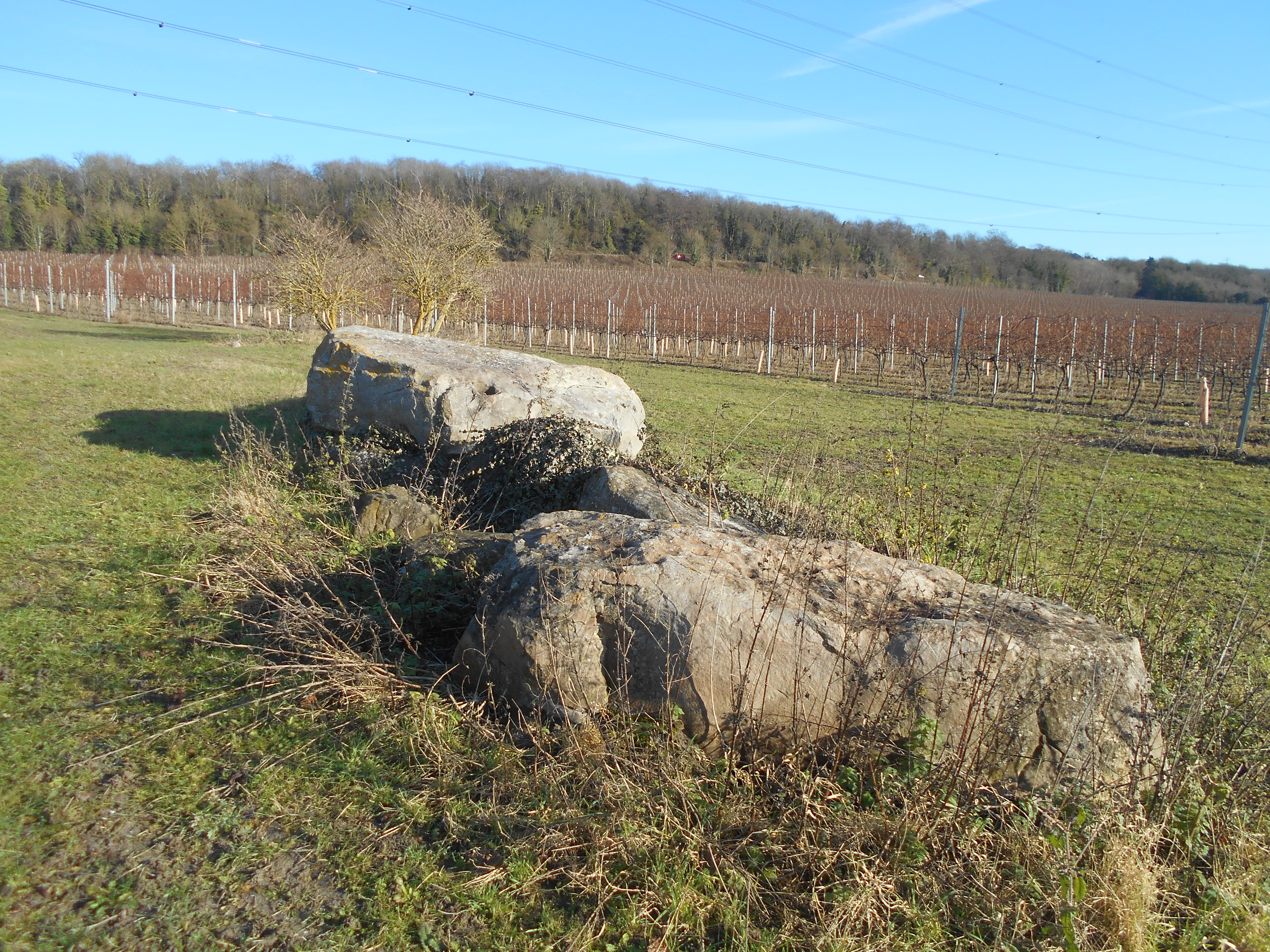
The Coffin Stone with Blue Bell Hill in the background

In 2005, Ashbee noted that he had raised the issue of the site's preservation with English Heritage and that their representative had informed him that they would not consider according it legal protection because they thought it a natural feature. The idea that the stone might have been natural had previously been voiced by the archaeologist Glyn Daniel on his visit to the site. Ashbee commented that "it has, however, for long been manifest that English Heritage is more concerned with commercialisation than affording appropriate protection to our national monuments".

Ashbee noted that any evidence for a chambered tomb at the site might be ascertained through geophysics or excavation. Led by the archaeologist Paul Garwood, a programme of field surveys, geophysical research, and excavations took place at the site as part of the Medway Valley Prehistoric Landscapes Project during 2008 and 2009. This found evidence for prehistoric activity in the vicinity of the megalith but was unable to accurately date these archaeological features. The investigators established that there was no evidence that a chambered long barrow had once stood there. They determined that the stone had been moved to its present location at some point in the post-medieval period (1450 to 1600). There was a large hollow in the chalk nearby which was akin to that found by excavators near to the Cuckoo Stone in Wiltshire; the archaeologists interpreted this as an extraction hollow, suggesting that the Coffin Stone had once stood upright at that spot.
