= Great Tottington =

British manor farm

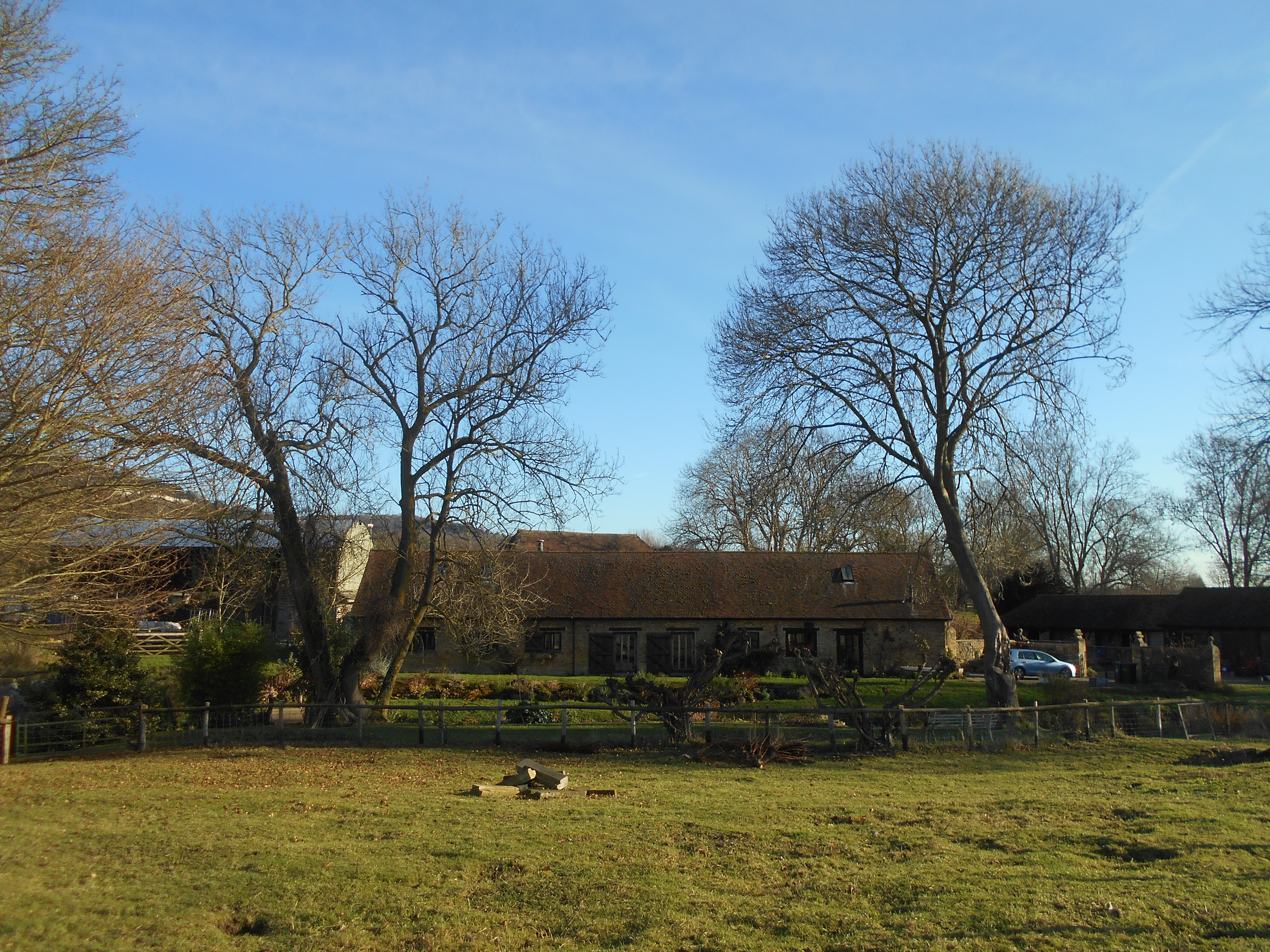
Great Tottington Farm

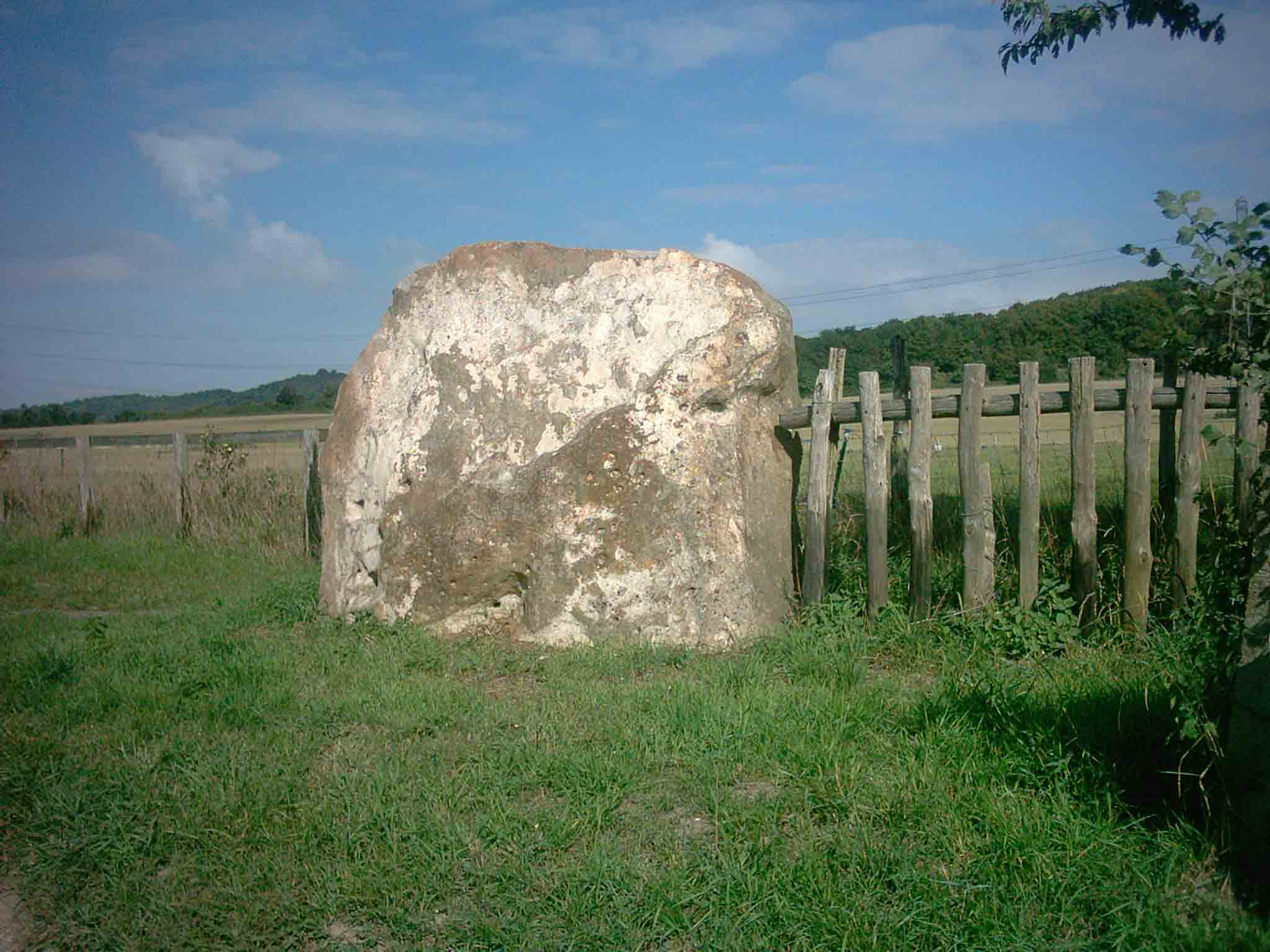
A sarsen standing at the entrance to Great Tottington. It is not recorded in the literature and was likely erected by the farmer

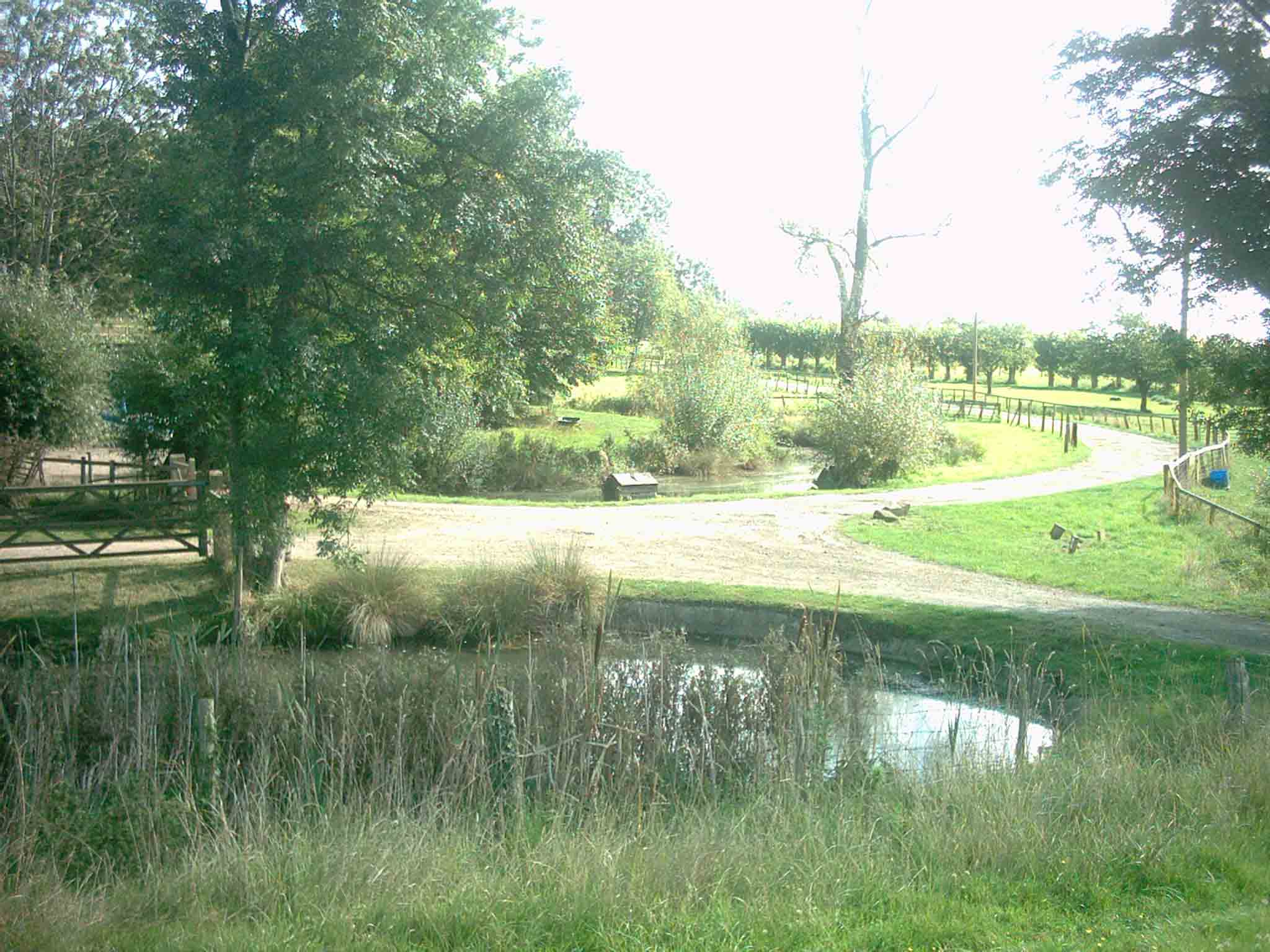
One of the spring-fed ponds at Great Tottington

Great Tottington is a moated manor farm near Maidstone in the English county of Kent. It is also the site of a spring, around which are scattered numerous sarsen stones which may be the remains of a Neolithic monument and part of the Medway megaliths. Further stones lie around the farmyard. Rather than being genuine megaliths, they may be a recent collection of natural stones brought to the site by eighteenth century farmers clearing the surrounding land. The destruction visited on the megalithic sites of the Medway valley during the eighteenth and nineteenth centuries makes conclusive diagnosis difficult.

In 1872 James Fergusson visited the area and noted:

...nearer the village [Aylesford] exists or existed, a line of great stones, extending from a place called Spring Farm, in a north-easterly direction, for a distance of three quarters of a mile, to another spot known as Hale Farm passing through Tollington [sic], where the greater number of the stones are now found. In front of the line near the centre at Tollington lie two obelisks, known to the country people as the coffin stones – probably from their shape. They are 12 feet long by 4 to 6 broad, and about 2 to 3 feet thick. They appear to be partially hewn, or at least shaped, so as to resemble one another.

A footnote records that one stone was almost completely underground, and the other partially buried, and that the dimensions were obtained by probing underground.

Theories that the stones are the remains of a stone circle or avenue have been suggested. If the stones are prehistoric however, it is more likely that they were brought from the nearby site of the chambered long barrow known as the Coffin Stone.
