= Cossington, Kent =

Farm settlement in Kent, England

Cossington is a small farm settlement on Blue Bell Hill north of Maidstone in the English county of Kent.

It is the site of a spring and also the site of a now lost group of sarsen stones thought to possibly be the remains of a Neolithic chambered long barrow and one of the Medway megaliths. The area is very close to the nearby sites of Kit's Coty House and the Countless Stones.

Little is known of the stones at Cossington; the lack of available knowledge and antiquarian interest at the site may mean that they may not be megalithic remains but natural periglacial stones. The upstanding stones may have been destroyed in the nineteenth century to provide building stone for the military garrisons at Sheerness and Chatham further downstream in the Medway valley.

In 1980 four stones buried in a pit were found in the area by a local farmer who broke his plough on them. The precise location has not been shared by the archaeologist who excavated them, apparently for fear of treasure hunters.
