= John Amyas Alexander =

English archaeologist (1922–2010)

John Amyas Alexander (27 January 1922 – 17 August 2010) was an archaeologist for more than 50 years and Fellow of St John's College, Cambridge. He was an influential teacher, a founder member of Rescue (the Trust for British Archaeology), an energetic fieldworker, and particularly active in promoting African archaeology. He served as President of the Rome Forum for African Archaeology and was Vice-President of both the Council for British Archaeology and The Prehistoric Society.

John Alexander in 1960

== Early years ==
John Alexander was born near Brighton, and grew up in Haywards Heath, Sussex. His electrician father, having fought in and survived the First World War, died in a motorbike accident two years after the end of the war, when John and his younger brother were four and two years old. The boys were looked after by female relatives for some years, until their mother Lily was able to qualify as a teacher to support the family. From 1933 to 1941, he was educated at Varndean School (formerly Varndean Boys School) in Brighton. He was keen on drama, and recalled that in a school production he once played Juliet to Paul Scofield's Romeo.

In March 1942, John enlisted in the Royal Electrical and Mechanical Engineers, and was discharged to a commission in the Indian Army Ordnance Corps in August 1943, serving in Burma as a Captain until December 1946, when he was discharged with the rank of Major.

In 1946, he obtained a place at Cambridge University assisted by a scheme for those whose education had been interrupted by the war. He was admitted to Pembroke College to study Modern History. While leading a walking tour in Austria during the long summer vacation, John met Yvonne Villeneau, daughter of a French family resident in London. They married, and John achieved his BA (Hons), in 1948. John then took up a teaching post at the secondary school at Hantoub, south of Khartoum in what was then Anglo-Egyptian Sudan, working for the Sudan Government Service, moving to Ahlia School, Omdurman in 1950. This was the start of a lifelong warm relationship with the people and culture of the Sudan. He was already following up an interest in archaeology, as related by Peter Shinnie, with whom he worked for the Sudan Antiquities Service during this time.

== Archaeology ==
In 1951, John and Yvonne returned to England and John undertook a Postgraduate Academic Diploma in Prehistoric Archaeology at the Institute of Archaeology in London (now part of UCL), studying under the visionary Gordon Childe, and specialising in pre-Roman Yugoslavia. Archaeology as a modern academic discipline was then coming into being, and John was inspired by the combination of fieldwork and theory that it offered. After competing the Dip Arch, John undertook a PhD in Archaeology at Cambridge University, focusing on the European Iron Age, which he gained in 1960. From 1956 to 1957, he held a Yugoslav Government Research Fellowship, which later formed the basis of his book 'Yugoslavia before the Roman Conquest'

He then became a Lecturer in Archaeology, initially for the University of London, and then from 1970 for the Department of Archaeology at the University of Cambridge, becoming a Fellow and Lecturer in Archaeology for St John's College in 1976, when he retired from the Department. During this time he also taught in the extramural departments of both Universities and conducted several practical Summer Schools. In 1967, he spent three months as Visiting Senior Lecturer at the University of Ghana, and in 1971 the same length of time as visiting professor at the University of Ibadan in Nigeria.

== Digs ==
1980–87: Director, Qasr Ibrim excavations (Egyptian Nubia)

== Publications ==
- Yugoslavia before the Roman conquest by John Alexander ed. Glyn Daniel Thames and Hudson, 1972, 175 pp. illus., maps, plans.
- Alexander, John (1988). "The Saharan divide in the Nile Valley: The evidence from Qasr Ibrim". The African Archaeological Review. 6: 73–90. doi:10.1007/BF01117113. S2CID 161151825.
