= Paul Ashbee =

British archaeologist

- Born: 23 June 1918; Bearsted, near Maidstone, Kent
- Died: 19 August 2009 (aged 91)
- Citizenship: British
- Education: University of London
- Known for: Leading authority on Neolithic and Bronze Age barrows
- Scientific career
- Fields: Archaeology

Paul Ashbee (23 June 1918 – 19 August 2009) was a leading British archaeologist, noted for his many excavations of barrows, or burial mounds, and for co-directing the Sutton Hoo digs (with Rupert Bruce-Mitford) from 1964 to 1972. He was also president of the Just William Society. He died of cancer on 19 August 2009, aged 91.

== Personal life ==
The only child of cabinet maker Lewis Ashbee and Hannah Mary Elisabeth, daughter of house decorator William Edward Birch Brett, of Thanet, Kent, Paul Ashbee was born in Bearsted, near Maidstone, Kent. He made national headlines when he uncovered the remains of a Roman villa on a farm at Thurnham when still a teenager. He joined the Royal West Kent Regiment for the duration of the war, followed by the Control Commission for Germany. Although without any qualifications he studied for a diploma in European prehistoric archaeology at the University of London in 1952, followed by a diploma in education at Bristol University and a MA at Leicester University. He became an assistant history master at Britain's first comprehensive school, Forest Hill School, Forest Hill, London where he stayed until 1966. He married Richmal Disher in 1952; the niece and literary executor of Richmal Crompton, she was a history student and they met at a dig at Verulamium, St Albans in 1949. She died in 2005, after which Ashbee became president of the Just William Society.

== Archaeology ==
Ashbee went into archaeology (during school holidays) after service in the army through the Second World War. He excavated widely across southern Britain and is best known as a leading authority on Neolithic and Bronze Age barrows. From 1976 to 1980 he was the President of the Cornwall Archaeology Society, and was also a commissioner of the Royal Commission on the Historical Monuments of England for 10 years.

=== Excavations ===
- 1949–50 — cemetery at Porthcressa, St Mary's, Isles of Scilly
- 1950–52 — assistant to Rupert Bruce-Mitford on the early medieval settlement at Mawgan Porth
- 1955 — barrow at Tregulland, north-east of Bodmin Moor
- 1960 — barrow at Wilsford, Normanton Down, Wiltshire
- 1964–71 — co-director with Rupert Bruce-Mitford at Sutton Hoo
- 1970–? — replacement of the capstones of the entrance grave at Bant's Carn and the multi-period settlement at Halangy, St Mary's, Isles of Scilly

== Selected works ==
- Ashbee, Paul (October–November 1954). "Excavation of the Great Barrow at Bishop's Waltham: Possible Burial of a Chief". The Archaeological News Letter. 5 (6). Linden Publicity: 109–110.
- Ashbee, Paul; Ashbee, Richmal C. L. (December 1954). "Excavation of a Barrow at Hindlow". The Archaeological News Letter. 5 (7). Linden Publicity: 134–135.
- 1960 The Bronze Age Round Barrow in Britain, Littlehampton Book Services Ltd, ISBN 978-0460076173
- 1970 The Earthen Long Barrow in Britain, University of Toronto Press, ISBN 978-0802015723
- 1974 Ancient Scilly, David & Charles, ISBN 978-0715365687
- 1978 The Ancient British, Geo Abstracts, ISBN 978-0860940142
- 1996 Halangy Down, St Mary's, Isles of Scilly, Excavations 1964–1977, Cornish Archaeology No 35
- 2005 Kent in Prehistoric Times, The History Press, ISBN 978-0752431369
