= George Lynn =

George Lynn may refer to:

- George Lynn (astronomer) (1676–1742), British astronomer and antiquary
- George Lynn (composer) (1915–1989), American composer, conductor, pianist, organist, singer, and music educator
- George Lynn (cricketer) (1848–1921), English cricketer
- George Lynn (actor) (1906–1964), American film and television actor
