= Parisi (tribe) =

British Celtic tribe from the area of East Riding of Yorkshire, England

Approximate supposed territory of the Parisi

The Parisi were a British Celtic tribe located somewhere within the present-day East Riding of Yorkshire, in England, known from a single brief reference by Ptolemy in his Geographica of about AD 150. Many academics connect them with the Arras material culture and some with the more widely known Parisii of Gaul.

== Etymology ==
The origin of the name is uncertain; Celticists John T. Koch and Raimund Karl propose a Celtic linguistic origin, meaning "the commanders", similar to the Welsh verb peri (to cause, command or have done, from Proto-Celtic *k^{w}er-). Linguist Eric Hamp also links the name to this verb and suggests a meaning of "fighters". Xavier Delamarre prefers to link the ethnic name to the P-Celtic root *pario- "cauldron" and translates Parisi as "they of the cauldrons" (taking their name after a distinctive type of vessel used by the Iron Age Celts).

== Geography ==
The Parisi are known from a description in Ptolemy's Geographica (Geographica II, 3, 10) which locates them to near Opportunum Sinus ("Good harbour"). (Note: Thought to be Bridlington bay, though this is not certain, also identified as Holderness or Spurn Head by 19th century authors. The bay at Filey has also been posited as a possible location.) Ptolemy is presumed never to have visited Roman Britain, compiling his work from existing sources, probably in Alexandria.

The tribe is inferred to have been surrounded by the Brigantes, and with the Coritani south of them across the Humber. Ptolemy mentions the Parisi in association with Petvaria, a town thought to be located close to Brough, East Riding of Yorkshire. (Note: The Roman settlement at Petuaria has been presumed to be at Brough, on the basis of an inscription found on a stone at an excavation as Bozzes (field) in Brough in 1937.) Ptolemy also mentions a promontory Promontarium Ocellum, which may be either Spurn Head or Flamborough Head.

The translation and interpretation of Ptolemy's work has not been consistent over time, with differing interpretations creating potential contradictions in the spatial relationship between Opportunum Sinus and Petuaria. A more recent interpretation (2005) places both the Parisi and Petuaria on the Opportunum Sinus which leads to the common interpretation of Opportunum Sinus to be impossible geographically – an alternative feature – the inlet near Brough to Walling Fen has been suggested. Brough/Petuaria also had a harbour in Roman times (further inland than the current Brough Haven) which has long since silted up, further supporting this interpretation.

The Parisi are also mentioned in the forgery De Situ Britanniae originally credited to Richard of Cirencester (14th century AD): the Parisi's towns supposedly included Petuaria and a place Portus Felix, the locations of which were uncertain, and subject to speculation in the 19th century.

== Culture ==
A 2026 study presented evidence for matriclans, matrilineality and matrilocality in the Arras material culture and likewise the Parisi tribe, the likely creators of that material culture.

== Possible links to Gaul ==
Burials in East Yorkshire dating from the pre-Roman Iron Age are distinguished as part of the Arras material culture, which show significant differences from surrounding areas. Arras burials generally lack grave goods, although chariot burials and burials with swords are known. There are similar chariot burials in the La Tene material culture found in western and central Europe, strengthening the potential link to the similarly named Parisii of Gaul. There is no known significant genetic connection between the Parisi and the Celtic peoples of Gaul, meaning archaeological similarities are likely due to cultural diffusion rather than mass migration of people.
