= Portus Felix =

Roman port in the East Riding of Yorkshire, England

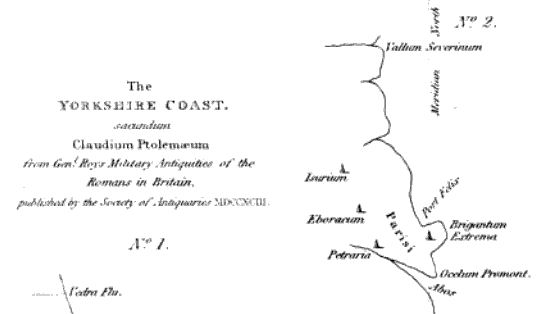
Portus Felix on Roy's 1793 map of the Roman Yorkshire coast

Portus Felix (or Sinus Salutaris meaning good harbour) was a small coastal town in the Roman province of Britannia, in the area that became the East Riding of Yorkshire. Filey is considered to be the probable location of the port settlement. Sewerby and Bridlington (formerly known as Burlington) have also been suggested.

The name of Portus Felix does not appear in the Ravenna Cosmography's list of all known places in the world in about 700 AD. Portuosus Sinus on Gabrantuicorum bay is in Ptolemy's Geographia and may be the same place. Charles Bartram's forged 14th-century manuscript De Situ Britanniae included the place names Petuaria and Portus Felix in the region of Ocellum occupied by the Parisi tribe.

On William Roy's 1793 map of Ptolemy's Geographia, the Parisi tribe is shown as inhabiting the area of Holderness peninsula in the East Riding of Yorkshire, north of Promontarium Ocellum (believed to be Spurn Head). Port Felix is shown above Brigantum Extrema (Flamborough Head), indicating its location as Filey Bay.

In 1857 the foundations of a 4th-century Roman signal station were discovered at the Carr Naze cliff edge on Filey Brigg, at the northern end of Filey Bay. The structure is 50 metres long with a square tower 14 meters wide, a defensive ditch and ramparts from a later era. Excavations at the time of the find and subsequently in the 1920s and 1990s uncovered Roman pottery and hoards of coins. The site is a protected Scheduled Monument.
