= Speculum Historiale =

Speculum Historiale can refer to:

- Speculum historiale de gestis regum Angliae ('Historial Mirror of the Deeds of the Kings of England') by Richard of Cirencester
- The third section of the Speculum Maius by Vincent of Beauvais
