= Beale Poste =

English antiquarian

Beale Poste (1793– April 15, 1871) was an English antiquary and Anglican cleric.

Beale was the second son of William Poste, a scion of an old Kentish family with his seat near Maidstone. The father was one of London's four common pleaders and sent Beale to Trinity Hall at Cambridge. The son dropped out and travelled in Europe. Upon his return, he was ordained, married Mary Jane Cousins in 1817, and returned to school to graduate LLB in 1819. He was curate at High Halden and then Milstead.

At Milstead, he devoted himself to archaeology and was one of the earliest members of the British Archaeological Association, writing for their journal. He moved to Bydews Place near Maidstone around 1851 and remained there until his death. His wife predeceased him by two years. The couple had three sons and four daughters. The third son, Edward, became director of Britain's civil service examinations.

B.B. Woodward credited him with the anonymous translation of Karl Wex's article on Charles Bertram's Description of Britain which appeared in the Gentleman's Magazine in October 1846.

== Bibliography ==
His works include:

- History of the College of All Saints (Maidstone: 1847)
- The Coins of Cunobeline and of the Ancient Britains (1853)
- Britannic Researches (1853)
- Britannia Antiqua (1857)
- Celtic Inscriptions on Gaulish and British Coins (1861)
