= Roman Roads in Britain =

Book written by Thomas Codrington

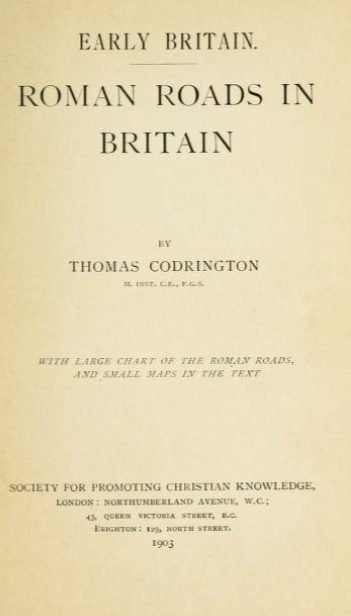
- Title page for Roman Roads in Britain (1903)
- Author: Thomas Codrington
- Language: English
- Publisher: Society for Promoting Christian Knowledge
- Publication date: 4 May 1903

Roman Roads in Britain (1903) was a book written by Thomas Codrington and published by the Society for Promoting Christian Knowledge in autumn 1903. Codrington deplored the impact of the spurious Itinerary attributed to Richard of Cirencester by the eighteenth-century forger Charles Bertram, published in 1757 as De Situ Britanniae ("On the Situation of Britain"). For nearly a hundred years this forgery had a major impact on antiquarian understanding of the Roman roads of Britain. It was not until 1847 that Friedrich Carl Wex used intertextual analysis to debunk the forgery. This was subsequently confirmed by John E. B. Mayor when he published an edition of a genuine text by Richard of Cirencester. However Codrington bemoaned "Though that was long ago shown to be a forgery, statements derived from it, and suppositions founded upon them, are continually repeated, casting suspicion sometimes undeserved on accounts which prove to be otherwise accurate." (RRIB, Preface). Furthermore, the mass production of Ordnance Survey maps in the late 19th century had further popularised Bertram's fabrications (RRIB, Introduction).

== Second Edition ==
The Second Edition was published in 1905, and involved the New York publisher E. S. Gorham. The chief revisions were the inclusion of information submitted by readers and gathered in an appendix.

== Third edition ==
The third edition was published in 1918, printed on larger and better quality paper than earlier editions. The material included in the appendix was integrated into the main text. Codrington noted that whilst new evidence of Roman roads had come to light, other remains and traces noted in the first edition had vanished. Nevertheless, as he had not been able to verify such changes he left his previous account unaltered. Although there were an additional 20,000 words, nothing substantial was altered.

Francis J. Haverfield, a professor of ancient history, reviewed this edition, saying that whilst he appreciated the accuracy of the surveying, "the surveyor has excluded the geographer". He also expressed dissatisfaction that Codrington had not effectively reviewed previous studies of the Roman Roads, and fails to address more detailed issues arising in particular circumstances.

== Online version ==
- Roman Roads in Britain
