= William Stukeley =

English antiquarian (1687–1765)

William Stukeley FRS FSA
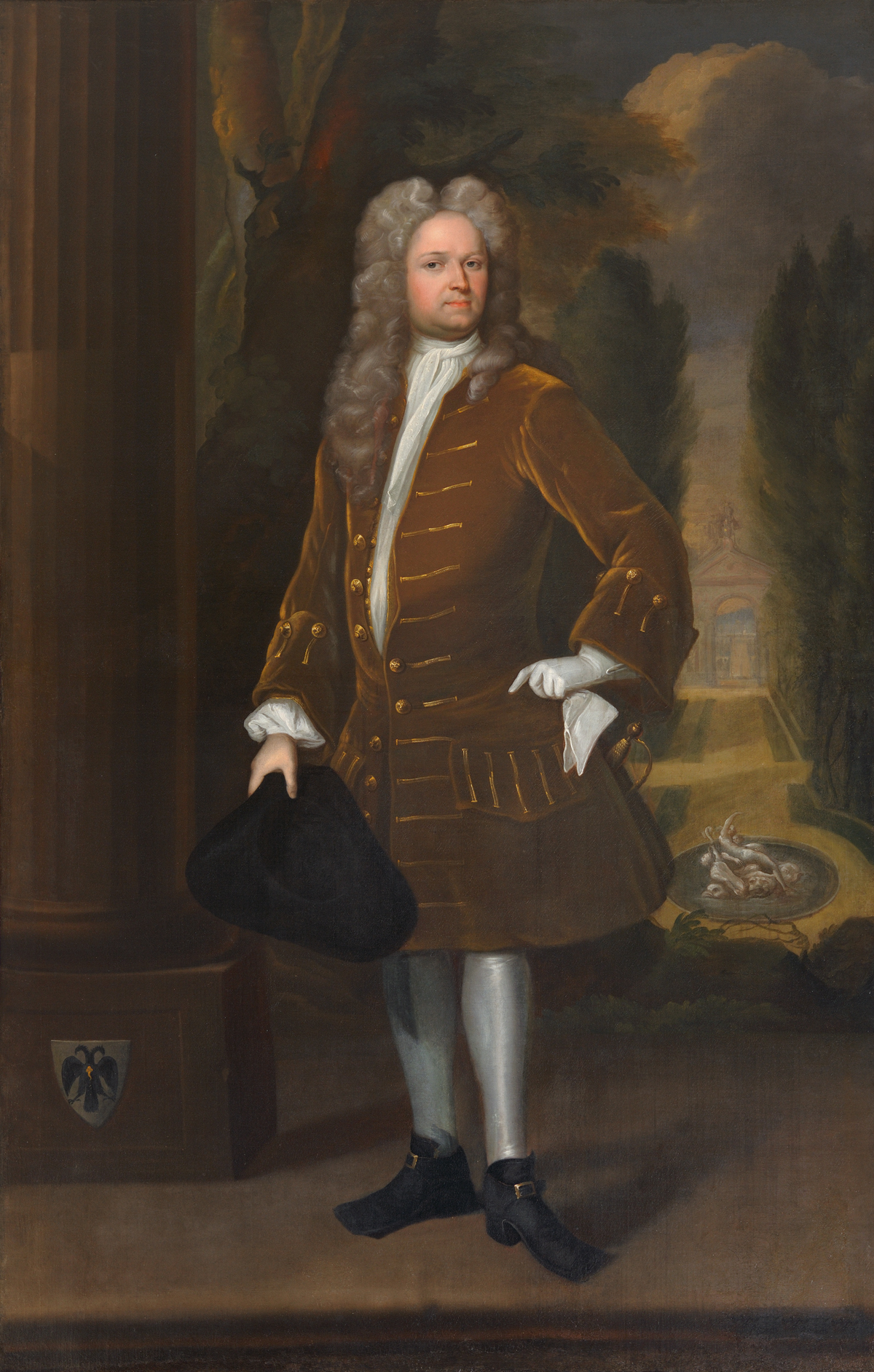
- Portrait attributed to Richard Collins, c. 1728–29
- Born: 7 November 1687; Holbeach, Lincolnshire, England
- Died: 3 March 1765 (aged 77); Kentish Town, Middlesex, England
- Education: Corpus Christi College, Cambridge
- Scientific career
- Fields: Archaeology

William Stukeley (7 November 1687 – 3 March 1765) was an English antiquarian, physician, and Anglican clergyman. A significant influence on the later development of archaeology, he pioneered the scholarly investigation of the prehistoric monuments of Stonehenge and Avebury in Wiltshire. He published over twenty books on archaeology and other subjects during his lifetime.

Born in Holbeach, Lincolnshire as the son of a lawyer, Stukeley worked in his father's law business before attending Bene't College, Cambridge. In 1709 he began studying medicine at St Thomas' Hospital, Southwark, before working as a general practitioner in Boston, Lincolnshire. From 1710 till 1725 he embarked on annual tours of the countryside, seeking out archaeological monuments and other features that interested him; he wrote up and published several accounts of his travels. In 1717, he returned to London and established himself within the city's antiquarian circles. In 1718 he was elected a Fellow of the Royal Society and became the first secretary of the Society of Antiquaries of London. In 1721 he became a Freemason and in 1722 co-founded the Society of Roman Knights, an organisation devoted to the study of Roman Britain. In the early 1720s, Stukeley developed a particular interest in Stonehenge and Avebury, two prehistoric stone circles in Wiltshire. He visited them repeatedly, undertaking fieldwork to determine their dimensions.

In 1726 Stukeley relocated to Grantham, Lincolnshire, where he married. In 1729 he was ordained as a cleric in the Church of England and appointed vicar of All Saints' Church in Stamford, Lincolnshire. He was a friend of the Archbishop of Canterbury William Wake, who encouraged him to use his antiquarian studies to combat the growth of deism and freethought in Britain. To this end, Stukeley developed the belief that Britain's ancient druids had followed a monotheistic religion inherited from the Biblical Patriarchs; he called this druidic religion "Patriarchal Christianity". He further argued that the druids had erected the stone circles as part of serpentine monuments symbolising the Trinity. In 1747 he returned to London as rector of St George the Martyr, Holborn. In the last part of his life, he became instrumental in British scholarship's acceptance of Charles Bertram's forged Description of Britain and wrote one of the earliest biographies of his friend, Isaac Newton.

Stukeley's ideas influenced various antiquaries throughout the eighteenth and early nineteenth centuries, in addition to artists like William Blake, although had been largely rejected by archaeologists by the second half of the nineteenth century. He is nevertheless regarded as an important forerunner of archaeology for his emphasis on methodically measuring and documenting ancient sites. He has since become the subject of multiple biographies and academic studies by scholars like Stuart Piggott, David Boyd Haycock, and Ronald Hutton.

== Biography ==
=== Childhood and university: 1687–1708 ===
Stukeley was born on 7 November 1687 in his parental home in Holbeach, Lincolnshire. He was the eldest child in a family of four boys and one girl; it is possible that he was named after William of Orange, who soon after became King of England. His paternal grandfather, John Stukeley (1623–1675), was a country gentleman who possessed a small estate at Uffington, Lincolnshire and who accrued a large number of debts by the time of his death. John had two sons; the elder, Adlard, was apprenticed to the legal profession, while the younger, also called John, was initially trained as a farmer before joining Adlard in a family law firm. On 28 May 1686, John married the teenage daughter of Robert Bullen in Pinchbeck, Lincolnshire; their first child was miscarried, with William being their second.

In 1692, at the age of five, Stukeley began an education at Holbeach's Free School, where he learned to read and write. By the age of thirteen, he was the top-rated pupil at his school. As a schoolchild, he began collecting Roman coins after a hoard was found nearby and also developed interests in botany and medicine. In 1700, he was taken out of school to work in his father's legal business. With his father he travelled south to London on various occasions, where he purchased many books and scientific instruments. He was nevertheless bored by his law activities, and when he requested that he be allowed to study at university, his father agreed.

He began studying at Cambridge University in November 1703 as a pensioner at Bene't College. Among the classes that he took during his studies were Classics, Ethics, Logic, Metaphysics, Divinity, Mathematics, and Philosophy. In his spare time, he dissected animals and searched for fossils in the gravel pits outside the town; in 1708 he dissected a hanged man. Outside of term time, he travelled to London, there taking anatomy courses with George Rolf and becoming acquainted with the poet John Gay. In February 1706 his father died, with his uncle passing away three weeks later. He returned home to sort out the family's financial affairs. In 1707 his mother then died, leaving him in charge of his younger siblings; to pay off family debts, he sold off their furniture and let out their Holbeach home. He also attracted local attention for dissecting a local who had committed suicide. In January 1909 he returned to Cambridge to defend his thesis, on the title of "Catamenia pendent a plethora". By this point he was taking a growing interest in architecture, producing careful pen-drawings of medieval buildings. He considered embarking on the fashionable Grand Tour of continental Europe to see the ancient ruins of Greece and Italy, but likely decided against it on financial grounds.

=== Medical career: 1709–1716 ===
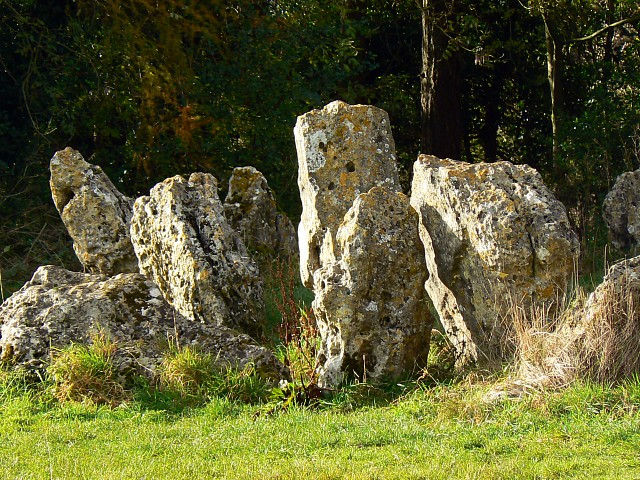
The Rollright Stones, which Stukeley visited, describing it as "the greatest Antiquity we have yet seen... a very noble, rustic, sight" which could "strike an odd terror upon the spectators".

In August 1709, Stukeley moved to London to further pursue medicine under doctor Richard Mead at St Thomas' Hospital. In March 1710, he left the city to practice medicine in the countryside, establishing a practice in Boston, Lincolnshire. He took with him a black servant, which would have been a status symbol at the time. Little is known of the time that he spent in the town, although in 1713 he was accorded Freedom of the Town. His brother, Adlard, moved in with him and in Boston was apprenticed to a local apothecary. Stukeley also formed a local botanic society that went on weekly plant-collecting trips in the local area. In 1715 he produced a print of Boston's St Botolph's Church, which he dedicated to the Marquis of Lindsey. Many of his travels around Lincolnshire were written up in what appears to be his first book, Iter Domesticum, although the year of its publication is not known.

From 1710 until 1725, Stukeley embarked on a horseback expedition through the countryside at least once a year, taking notes on the things that he observed. In 1710, for example, he first visited the prehistoric ceremonial complex, the Rollright Stones. At the time, his interests were not purely antiquarian, for he also took notes on landscape gardens and other more recent constructions that he encountered. In 1712, Stukeley embarked on an extensive tour of western Britain, taking in Wales before returning to England to visit Grantham, Derby, Buxton, Chatsworth, and Manchester. He later published an account of these travels in Western Britain as Iter Cimbricum. Stukeley's later biographer Stuart Piggott related that this book was "not yet the characteristic product of a field archaeologist" but rather "differs little from that which could be written by any intelligent gentleman of the period".

Stukeley befriended the antiquary Maurice Johnson and joined Johnson's learned society, the Spalding Gentlemen's Society, which was based in Spalding, Lincolnshire. A 1714 letter indicates that Johnson recommended several books on British history to Stukeley, apparently at the latter's request; the suggested titles included Julius Caesar's De Bello Gallico, John Milton's The History of Britain, Robert Brady's An Introduction to the Old English History, Peter Heylin's Help to English History, and Richard Rowlands' A Restitution of Decayed Intelligence in Antiquities concerning the most noble and renowned English Nation. Another letter to Johnson, this time from May 1714, reveals that Stukeley was assembling a series of chronological tables of all British kings since Brutus of Troy; following the medieval historian Geoffrey of Monmouth, Stukeley believed that the legendary Brutus was a real historical figure. In September 1716, he wrote an account of Richborough Castle, a Roman military fort in Kent. That same year, he described having made a model of the Neolithic/Bronze Age stone circle of Stonehenge.

=== Return to London: 1717–1725 ===
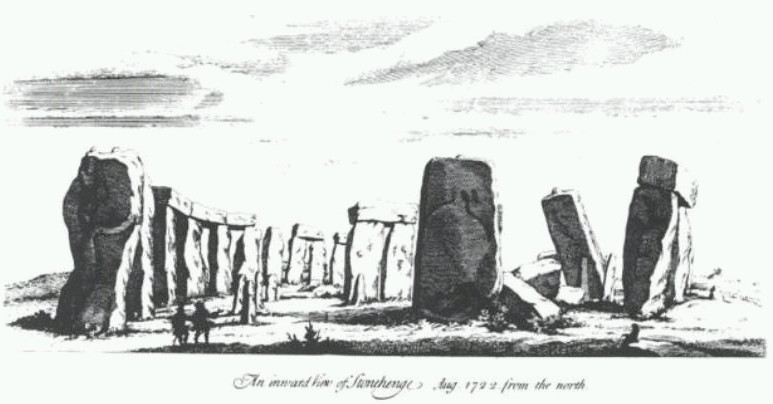
An inward view of Stonehenge from August 1722

By May 1717, Stukeley had returned to London, living in Great Ormond Street. Once in the city he began to circulate within its antiquarian circles. At Mead's nomination, in early 1718 he was elected as a Fellow of the Royal Society, then under the presidency of the scientist Isaac Newton. Stukeley befriended Newton and visited him at his home on several occasions; he was part of a coterie in the society who supported Newtonian philosophy.

Stukeley lectured to the society on a "fossil crocodile or porpoise" in 1719 (a plesiosaur now on display in the Natural History Museum, London), arguing that it was evidence for the Genesis flood narrative; in February 1720, he lectured to the society on female human anatomy, illustrated with drawings of a cadaver he had autopsied. Following Edmond Halley's resignation as society secretary, in November 1721, Stukeley put himself forward as a potential replacement; he unsuccessfully ran against Newton's favoured candidate, James Jurin. This upset some of Stukeley's friendships in the group and cooled his relationship with Newton for several years.

Also in 1718, Stukeley joined the newly founded Society of Antiquaries of London and became its first secretary. In 1721–22 he was partly instrumental in setting up the society's committee on coins. He nevertheless appears to have taken little active part in the society's business. He retained his interest in medical matters, and in June 1719 took a medical doctorate in Cambridge, enabling him to join the London College of Physicians in 1720.

In October 1720, he was one of the physicians who conducted an autopsy of a deceased elephant in Hans Sloane's Chelsea garden. In March 1722 he gave the Goulstonian Lecture at the Royal College theatre; his topic was the human spleen. He published his lectures as On the Spleen in 1722, appending to it his "Essay Towards the Anatomy of the Elephant". According to Stukeley biographer David Boyd Haycock, On the Spleen was significant as "his first major publication, and his only one in anatomy".

Stukeley developed a friendship with two brothers who shared many of his antiquarian interests, Roger and Samuel Gale. From his father, the former Dean of York Thomas Gale, Roger had inherited a copy of the Monumenta Britannica, a work produced by seventeenth-century antiquarian John Aubrey. He showed it to Stukeley, who produced a transcription of Aubrey's document in either 1717 or 1718. Piggott suggested that it was Aubrey's manuscript that first brought Avebury to Stukeley's attention. Circa 1718, Stukeley first visited the site, accompanied by the Gale brothers. In 1719, he visited again, also taking in Stonehenge before traveling to Oxford to meet Thomas Hearne, an antiquarian who was highly critical of Stukeley. That summer, he spent time in Great Chesterford in Essex, where he identified a Romano-British temple from crop marks in a field.

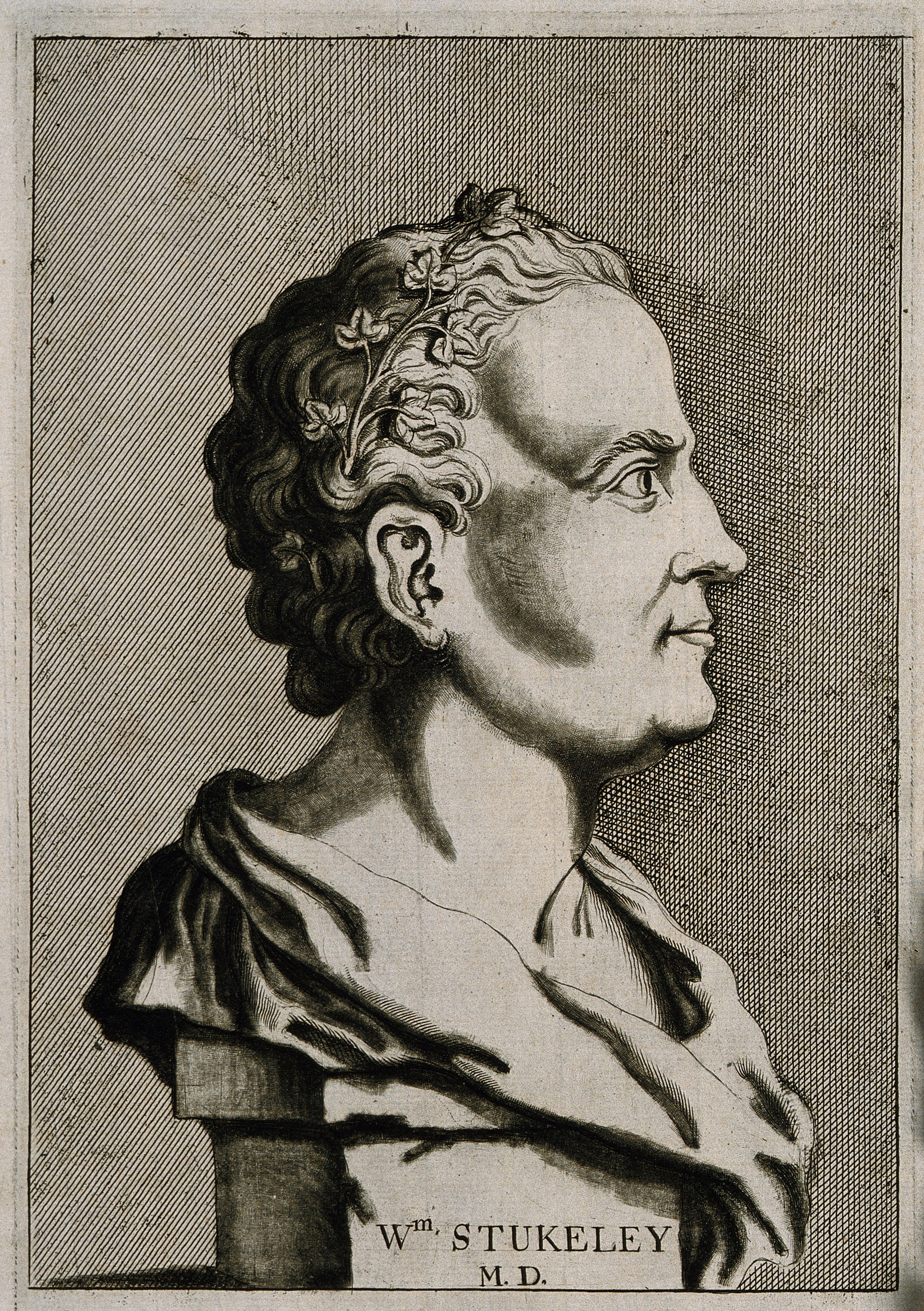
A 1776 line engraving of Stukeley, based on a 1727 illustration by I. Whood

Stukeley devoted much attention to Avebury during the 1720s. The records he produced of how the monument and its various features looked at the time has been important for later archaeologists for by the early twentieth century—when the earliest sustained archaeological investigation of the site took place—many of these features had been lost. He witnessed locals breaking up megaliths in the circle and although powerless to stop them it may have been this observation that led him to produce a detailed record of the site.

In January 1721, Stukeley was initiated as a Freemason. He suspected that Freemasonry was the "remains of the mysterys of the antients [sic]". By 1723 he was the Master of the Masonic Lodge meeting at Fountain Tavern on London's Strand. In July 1722, he and several friends formed the Society of Roman Knights, an organisation devoted to the study of Roman Britain. The group began with sixteen members before attracting new recruits over the following two years. In admitting women as well as men, the Society was unprecedented within British society at the time; the Society of Antiquaries for instance would not admit female members for another two centuries. Members of the Roman Knights each took a name from the Romano-British period; Stukeley's was "Chyndonax", the name of a priest listed in a Greek inscription reputedly found in a glass cinerary urn in 1598. Through the society he also became close friends with Francis Seymour-Conway, 1st Marquess of Hertford and Heneage Finch, 5th Earl of Winchilsea; he encouraged the latter to carry out archaeological fieldwork, as at Julliberrie's Grave in Kent.

In August 1721, Stukeley and Roger Gale set forth on another tour, visiting Avebury and Stonehenge before going to Gloucester, Hereford, Ludlow, Wolverhampton, Derby, and finally reaching Grantham in October. He wrote up his notes of the journey as Iter Sabrinum.

He returned to Avebury in the summer of 1722 — this time with the artists Gerard Vandergucht and John Pine, who had both become Roman Knights that year — before proceeding to Stonehenge and Silchester. In September and October he embarked on another tour, this time taking in Cambridge, Boston, Lincoln, Dunstable, Leminster and Rochester, largely following Roman roads. He published a description of this tour as Iter Romanum.

In 1723, he travelled from London to Newbury and Marlborough before visiting Stanton Drew stone circles, and then heading back east to Bath, Exeter and Dorchester. These tours were written up as Iter Dumnoniense and Iter Septimum Antonini Aug. He also wrote an account of Dorchester's Maumbury Rings in October 1723 as Of the Roman Amphitheater at Dorchester.

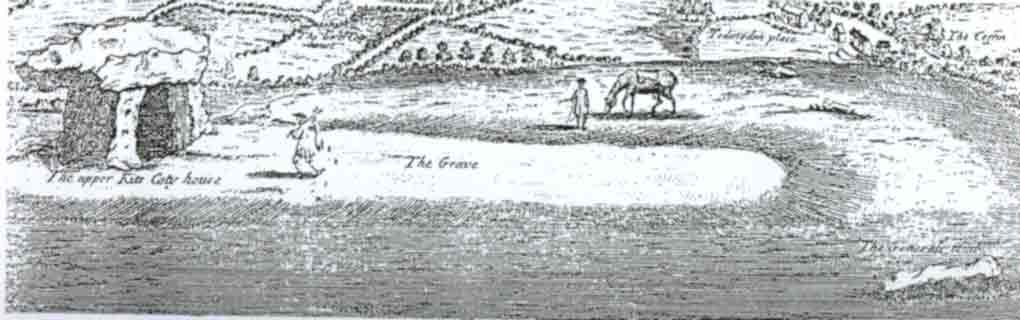
Stukeley's drawings such as this 1722 prospect of Kit's Coty House in Kent have provided valuable information on monuments since damaged.

It was while at Avebury in 1723 that he began a draft of the History of the Temples of the Ancient Celts. This work drew upon his fieldwork at both Avebury and Stonehenge as well as his field-notes from other prehistoric sites and information obtained from the 'Templa Druidum' section of John Aubrey's Monumenta Britannica. The work also cited Biblical and Classical texts. In the book, Stukeley discussed how prehistoric people might have erected such monuments using sledges, timber cradles, rollers and levers. He devoted much space to refuting the suggestion, made by Inigo Jones and J. Webb, that Stonehenge had been erected by the Romans, instead attributing it to the prehistoric—or as he called it, "Celtic"—period. The druids are mentioned only briefly in the book, when Stukeley suggested that they might be possible creators of the stone circles.

In 1724, Stukeley returned to Avebury and Stonehenge, returning via Ringwood and Romsey before heading up to Lincoln and then back down to Kent later in the year. This was the final year in which he conducted fieldwork at Avebury. The Oxford English Dictionary lists that the first known use of the word relationship is from 1724, in his writings. In 1725, Stukeley engaged in the last of his great tours, this time with Roger Gale.

This took him from Dunstable up into the Midlands, where he visited Coventry, Birmingham, Derby and Buxton before heading west to Chester and then north for Liverpool and the Lake District; there he visited stone circles like Long Meg and Her Daughters and Castlerigg stone circle. From there, Stukeley and Gale travelled further north to Whitehaven and then Hadrian's Wall, following it along to Newcastle before heading south back to London via Durham and Doncaster.

=== Marriage and the clergy: 1726–46 ===
In 1726, Stukeley left London and relocated to Grantham in Lincolnshire. The reasons for his decision to do so are obscure. It may be that he left the city due to frustration that his antiquarian research was not being financially supported by wealthier benefactors. On his move to Grantham, Stukeley resigned as secretary of the Society of Antiquaries. Stukeley struggled to earn a living as a physician in Grantham; he also established a Freemasonic lodge in the town, although it never appeared on the roll of the Grand Lodge of England. In December 1727 he married Frances Williamson, daughter of a gentleman from Allington. The couple's attempts to conceive children met with failure, and Frances suffered two miscarriages. In October 1728, Stukeley buried the second of the two unborn infants in his garden, performing a funeral ceremony that drew upon his interest in ancient Roman practices. Frances subsequently bore Stukeley three further daughters.

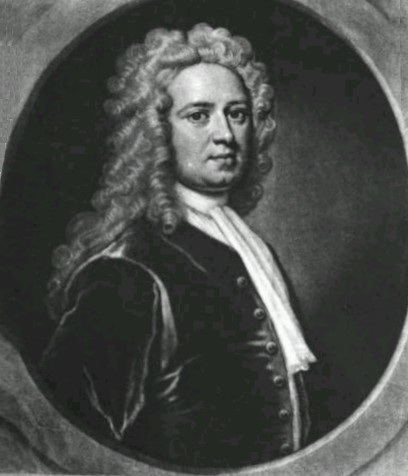
Illustration of Stukeley

Stukeley was friendly with the Archbishop of Canterbury William Wake, who shared his interest in antiquarianism. Stukeley asked his friend if he may become a cleric in the Church of England, a request which Wake granted in June 1729. Wake ordained him as a deacon in Croydon on 20 July 1729. Given his intellectual pursuits, Wake saw Stukeley as a welcome recruit in the Church of England's conflict with Freethought.

In October 1729, the Lord Chancellor Peter King granted Stukeley the living of All Saints' Church, Stamford, taking up residence in the town in early 1730. He enjoyed the town's medieval architecture, and began to write a history of the settlement in the form of a dialogue. He also enjoyed gardening while living in the town, in 1738 building a "Hermitage" in his garden, which featured niches, a stone arch and a fountain.

According to Piggott, Stukeley's ordination was "the essential turning-point in his whole life". His reasons for joining the clergy are not known for certain. One possibility is that he sought the steady income supplied by a Church of England living, having for a while complained about how little he earned as a doctor. Alternately, he may have believed that becoming a cleric would be a secure position from which he could pursue the unorthodox ideas he was developing. His decision to join the clergy concerned friends like Robert Gale. To Piggott, Stukeley sought to use his fieldwork "as ammunition in a holy war against the Deists". Stukeley would write that his purpose in becoming a cleric was "to combat the deists from an unexpected quarter", describing his "resentment of that deluge of profaneness and infidelity that prevails so much at present, and threatens an utter subversion of religion in general".

In 1736, he co-founded a local antiquarian and literary society, The Brazen Nose, with six other founder-members (George Lynn being one of them). It held weekly meetings at which they discussed a varied range of subjects; the first meeting involved discussions of astronomy, lunar maps, a wasp's nest, a medieval seal, and a bladder stone the size of a walnut that had been retrieved from a small dog. The society eventually lapsed, and Stukeley's attempt to revive it in 1746 proved unsuccessful. He also remained interested in the local discovery of antiquities; he became aware of a large, silver Romano-British dish uncovered at Risley Park, Derbyshire in 1729 and read an account of it to the Society of Antiquaries in 1736. In October 1742, Stukeley was alerted to the discovery of the Royston Cave by local politician William Goodhall. He wrote about the site in his 1743 book, Palaeographia Britannica No. I', in which he argued that the cave's decorated chamber was established as a hermitage for a Lady Roisia de Vere circa 1170. A 1744 pamphlet was then issued by the Reverend Charles Parkin, arguing that the carvings were Anglo-Saxon in origin. Stukeley was affronted by the suggestion, and wrote his 1746 Origines Roystonianae II in response to it. In 1740, he was removed as a member of the Society of Antiquaries for not renewing his membership dues.

In 1740, he published Stonehenge, a book that he described as being devoted to the subject of "Patriarchal Christianity". He believed that learned people would read the book to learn about stone circles and druids, and that in doing so they would encounter the ancient proto-Christian of Britain and thus recognise how similar it was to modern Anglicanism. In doing so, he believed, they would reject the ideas promoted by deism and the freethinkers.

In the winter of 1737, Stukeley's wife died at the age of forty. By February 1737/38, he suggested to Samuel Gale that they live together, although this plan never came to fruition. In 1739, Stukeley married the Gale brothers' sister, bringing her to live with him at Stamford. Her marriage portion of £10,000 allowed Stukeley to maintain two houses from 1740 onward; summers were spent at Stamford while winters were spent in his home in Gloucester Street, London. Also in 1739, he went into business producing medicinal oils with the daughter of John Rogers, a recently deceased apothecary whose wares Stukeley had previously championed.

When in London, he regularly attended meetings of the Royal Society. In December 1741, he was appointed an associate member of the Egyptian Society, a group led by Lord Sandwich as its first president. Through the society, Stukeley became friends with the 2nd Duke of Montagu, regularly visiting the latter's home at Boughton House, Northamptonshire. Inspired by the medieval Gothic buildings, he began designing various Gothic plans of his own. This included a Gothic bridge and a mausoleum designed for the Duke of Montagu's estate, although neither were ever built.

In 1746, Stukeley drew up a very careful account of Charles I's journey from Oxford to the Scottish army camp near Newark in 1646.

=== Final years: 1747–1765 ===
In late 1747, Stukeley became the rector for St George the Martyr, Queen Square, a parish in Bloomsbury, London. He moved permanently to the city in February 1748. Stukeley was a friend of Isaac Newton and wrote a memoir of his life in 1752. This is one of the earliest sources for the story of the falling apple that inspired Newton's formulation of the theory of gravitation. In the 1750s, he became a regular attendee at Royal Society events. However, within the group he found himself increasingly sidelined under the presidency of Martin Folkes; although the pair retained a cordial relationship, Stukeley felt that Folkes was responsible for a decline in the quality of the society and was likely upset by Folkes' mocking attitude towards Christianity.

Following Sloane's death in 1753, Stukeley was selected as a trustee to help establish the British Museum, reflecting his standing in London antiquarian circles. He was also involved in the running of the Foundling Hospital, where he became acquainted with the illustrator William Hogarth.

In 1753, a Late Bronze Age tool hoard was uncovered during landscaping at Kew Gardens; Stukeley was invited to come and inspect the discovery the following year, at which point he met with the Princess Augusta of Saxe-Gotha, who had an interest in antiquarian matters. In 1754, he was re-admitted to the Society of Antiquaries. That same year, one of Stukeley's parishioners died, leaving his book collection to the Bodleian Library and Lincoln College, Oxford. Stukeley was left as one of his executors, and, in May 1755, transported the book collection to Oxford. Following the 1755 Lisbon earthquake, Stukeley developed an active interest in the subject, presenting papers on earthquakes to the Royal Society and, in 1750, publishing Philosophy of Earthquakes, Natural and Religious.

In June 1747, Stukeley had received a letter from Charles Bertram, an Englishman living in Denmark. In their ensuing correspondence, Bertram claimed to possess a copy of a manuscript allegedly produced by a 14th-century monk from Winchester known as Richard of Cirencester, which in turn contained an account and map of Roman Britain. Stukeley expressed caution regarding Bertram's claims, asking for detailed information regarding the original manuscript's provenance, with Bertram responding that he could not provide any because he had been sworn to secrecy by the man who supplied him with it. Stukeley unsuccessfully attempted to buy the manuscript from Bertram, stating that he would deposit it in the library of the British Museum. In March and again in April 1756, Stukeley read papers on Bertram's manuscript to the Society of Antiquaries of London. He published these in 1757 as An Account of Richard of Cirencester, Monk of Westminster, and of his Works, which reproduced the map but not the text of the original manuscript, instead consisting of Stukeley's own commentary. At the time, many antiquarians regarded it as a genuine text, although a few had suspicions; in 1795, Thomas Reynolds declared that Bertram's document was a forgery, although this would be widely recognised only in the 19th century. This discovery damaged Stukeley's reputation among later scholars, bolstering his reputation for credulity. Stukeley had similarly been taken in by another forgery, James Macpherson's Ossian poems, writing to Macpherson in praise of his alleged discovery.

Stukeley also displayed a growing interest in the Roman Emperor Carausius and his coinage. In 1750, he and John Kennedy saw a sketch of a silver coin that had been discovered at Silchester and donated to the King of France. Both of them misread the legend on the reverse of the coin, believing that it read "ORIVNA"; it had actually read "FORTVNA", but with the "F" largely eroded. In 1751, Kennedy published his Dissertation on Oriuna, in which he claimed that Oriuna was the guardian goddess of Carausius. Stukeley disagreed, believing that Oriuna was Carausius' wife; he published this argument as Palaeographia Britannica No. III in 1752.

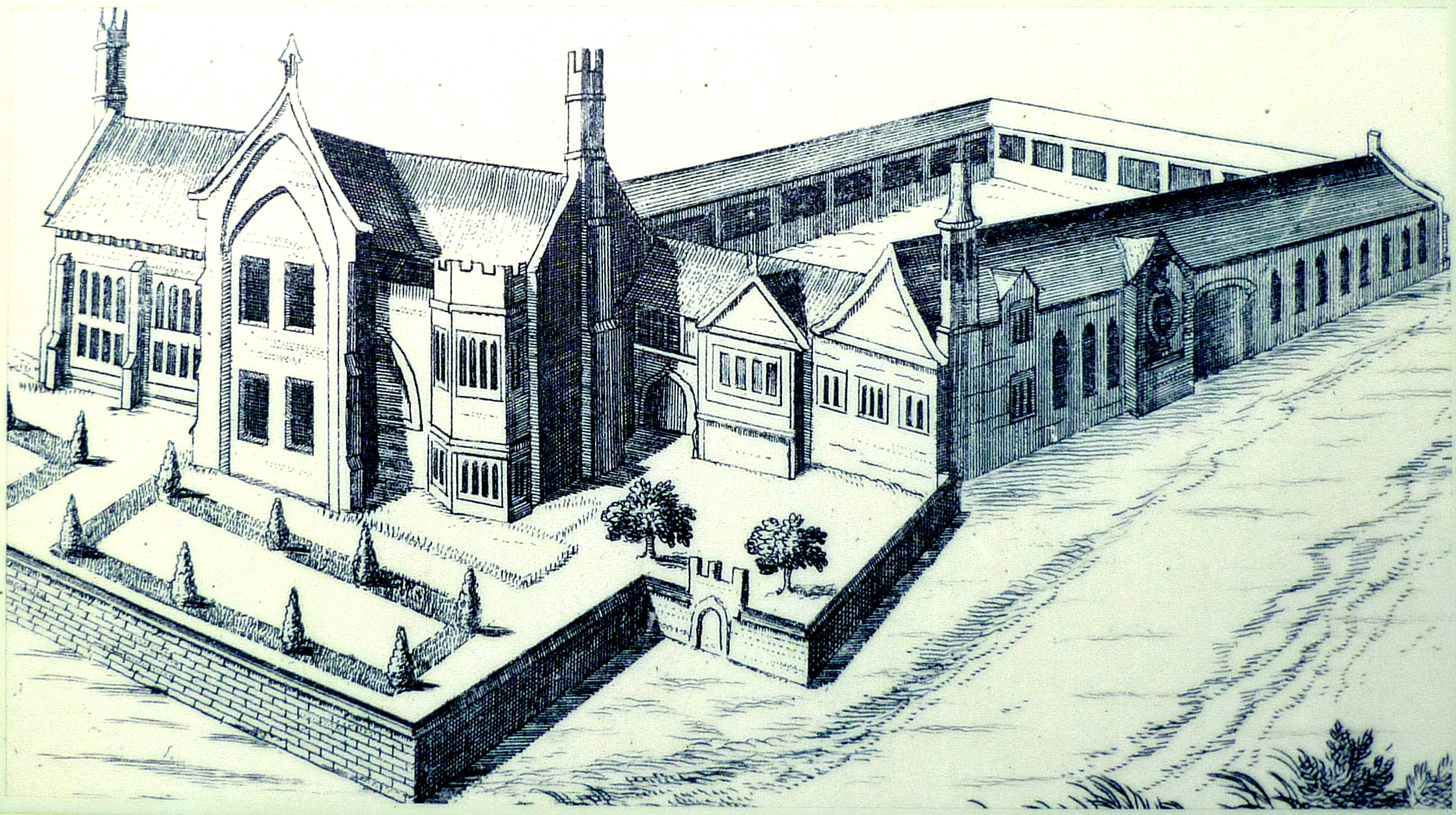
A 1721 view of Gloucester Blackfriars by Stukeley

The last decade of Stukeley's life was — according to Piggott — "relatively uneventful". He had re-joined the Society of Antiquaries but the papers presented there were increasingly treated un-seriously, while at the Royal Society, his papers were turned down and not published in its Transactions. He retained his concern with the destruction of ancient monuments, in particular the pillaging of Hadrian's Wall for stone, imploring Princess Augusta to intervene and raising the issue in a November 1757 report for the Society of Antiquaries. He also raised concerns about the sturdiness of the Eleanor cross at Waltham Cross and ensured it was renovated.

In 1757, Stukeley's second wife died. In 1759, Stukeley purchased a cottage in the (then largely rural) area of Kentish Town, to the north of London. In 1763, he published Paleographia Sacra, or Discourses on Sacred Subject as a collection of some of his Sunday sermons.

In early 1765, Stukeley suffered a stroke, fell into a coma and remained in this state for three days before dying in his bed on 3 March, aged 77. He was buried without a monument in the churchyard of St Mary Magdalene's Church, East Ham, which he is said to have selected as his resting-place on a visit there during his lifetime.

== Ideas ==
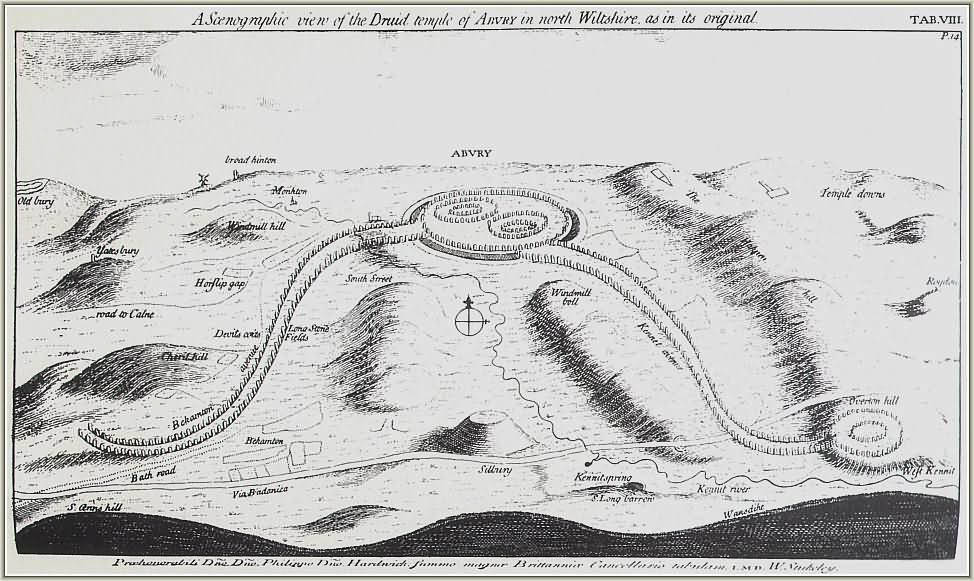
Stukeley's serpent interpretation of the megaliths at Avebury in Wiltshire. Silbury Hill is in the foreground.

Hutton noted that Stukeley "always had a strong streak of mysticism and interpreted ancient remains in accordance with set notions concerning the nature of primeval religion." He had a strong belief in immanent or inherent divinity. His belief in an immanent and interconnected divinity led him to adopt ideas from Pythagoreanism and Neoplatonism: from the former he adopted the belief that music and numbers expressed the divine order, while from the latter he adopted the notion of hidden correspondences between various parts of the natural world.

Few of Stukeley's ideas were wholly original, being based on earlier sources. His general framework for understanding Britain's prehistoric past derived from his belief in the literal truth of Biblical mythology, including the Creation of the world in 4004 BC and events like the Genesis flood narrative. There is no evidence that when he started investigating Avebury and Stonehenge in 1719, he regarded them as having been erected by the druids. At the time, many antiquarians believed that they had been created in more recent periods; Inigo Jones believed Stonehenge had been built by Romans, Walter Charleton by Danish invaders in the Anglo-Saxon period, while Edmund Bolton attributed it to the ancient British but not specifically the druids. In adopting the idea that the druids had erected these monuments, he was following the ideas of Aubrey, which he had read in unpublished manuscript form.

Stukeley believed that the druids were part of "an oriental colony" of Phoenicians who had settled in Britain between the end of Noah's flood and the time of Abraham. He stated that the druids were "of Abraham's religion intirely [sic]" and that, although never having encountered divine revelation, had concluded through their own reasoning that God existed as a Trinity. He also stated that their religion was "so extremely like Christianity, that in effect in differ'd from it only in this; they believed in a Messiah who was to come into this world, as we believe in him that is come."

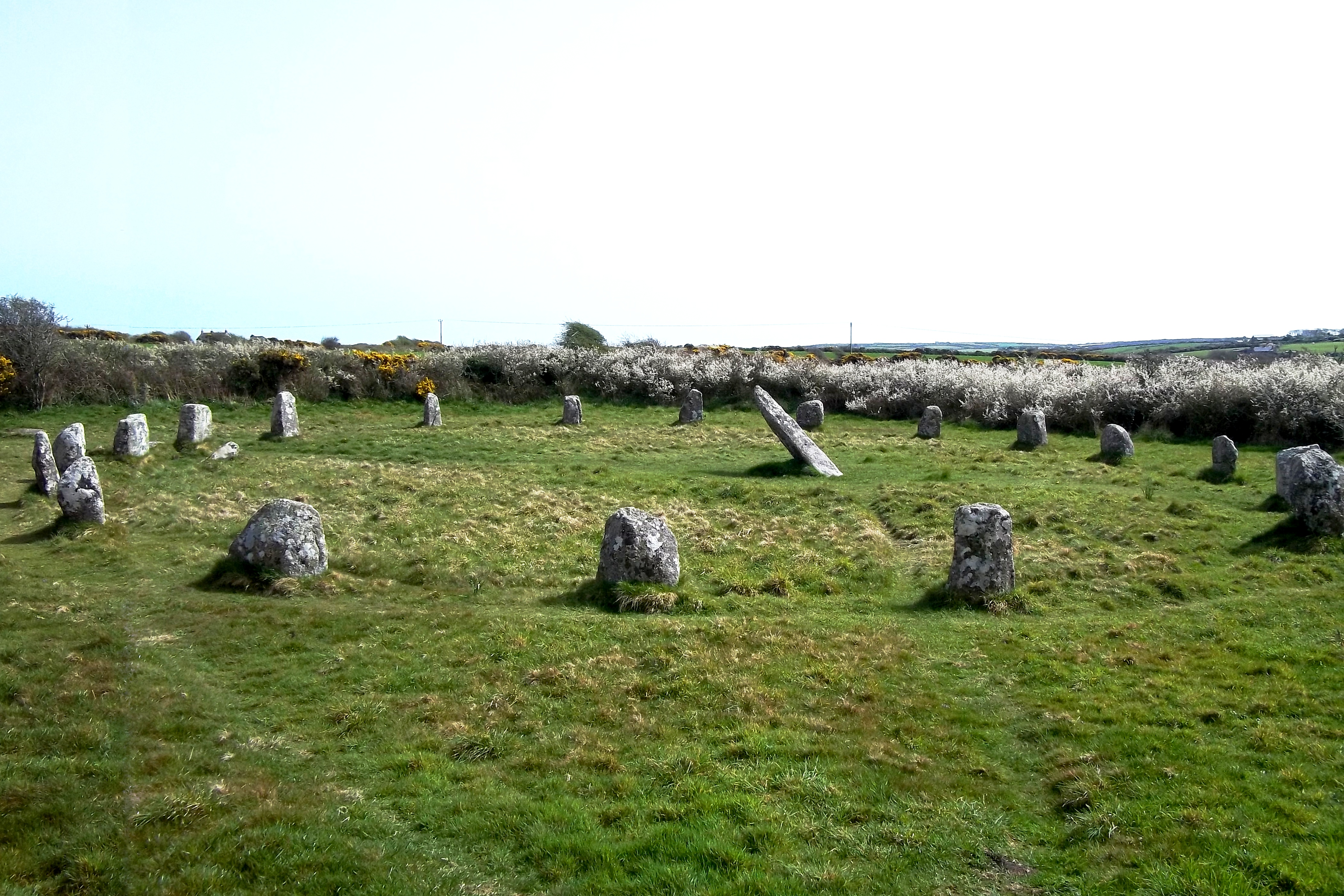
Stukeley believed that the Boscawen-Un stone circle in Cornwall was built by Hercules, whom he regarded as a Phoenician druid

He believed that the leader of the Phoenician druids had been Hercules, who had landed in western Britain and created the Boscawen-Un circle in Cornwall. The idea that Hercules had arrived in south-west Britain was not original to Stukeley, having been adopted from Aylett Sammes' Britannia Antiqua Illustrata from 1676. Stukeley also believed that, because of Britain's isolated location, the druids had preserved the ancient monotheistic religion and that "the true religion has chiefly, since the repeopling of mankind after the flood, subsisted in our land".

His idea that the druids once formed a monotheistic priesthood akin to those of modern Christians also owed an influence from older sources. Michael Drayton's 1612 poem Poly-Olbion had for instance portrayed them as wise, monotheistic sages and philosophers.

By the time he became a cleric, he had come to believe that the ancient Egyptians, Plato and the druids all accepted the existence of the Trinity. By June 1730, he was claiming that Avebury was a symbolic depiction of the Trinity. He believed that ancient humans had venerated the components of the cosmos, such as the heavenly bodies and the four elements, and that they recognised the numbers and musical harmonies from which the cosmos had been created.

The idea that Britain was God's chosen nation was a recurrent idea in Stukeley's thought. He thought that Britons should emulate the ancient Romans. Stukeley believed that God had created the Roman Empire to prepare for the arrival of Jesus and to assist in the spread of Christianity throughout Europe. In this, he believed that the ancient Romans had replaced the Jews as God's chosen people. In his view, the Roman Empire collapsed because its inhabitants had corrupted Christianity with what he called "superstitious fopperys" and that this perverted mixture survived as the Roman Catholic Church. Like many English people of his time, he believed that the Church of England, which had split from the Roman Catholic Church during the 16th-century English Reformation, had gained special favour from God; in Stukeley's words, it represented "the main support of religion now upon the face of the earth". Haycock noted that "a leading theme in Stukeley's antiquarian work" was "the resurrection of British history as an archetype for world history, and of Britain as a country historically fit to lead the world into the future". He criticised Britons who favoured archaeological remains encountered abroad during the Grand Tour, claiming that they were neglecting their own national heritage and adopting continental habits and vices such as effeminacy.

=== Fieldwork ===
Stukeley placed an emphasis on measuring and recording historical sites and encouraged his various correspondents to do the same. He engaged in excavation by digging in and around archaeological sites, relating that doing so was "like an anatomical dissection". He recognised the principle of stratigraphy, that different layers of soil reflected different periods in the development of a site.

From the 1720s, he believed that the prehistoric complex at Avebury was laid out to represent a snake with its head and tail. By 1724, he was arguing that the snake was a symbol of Christ, with its shedding of skin echoing the resurrection and the circle or head representing the unity and wholeness of God. Using Halley's arguments about the gradual shift in the compass over time, Stukeley calculated that Stonehenge was built in 460 BC and Avebury in 1860 BC.

== Personal life ==
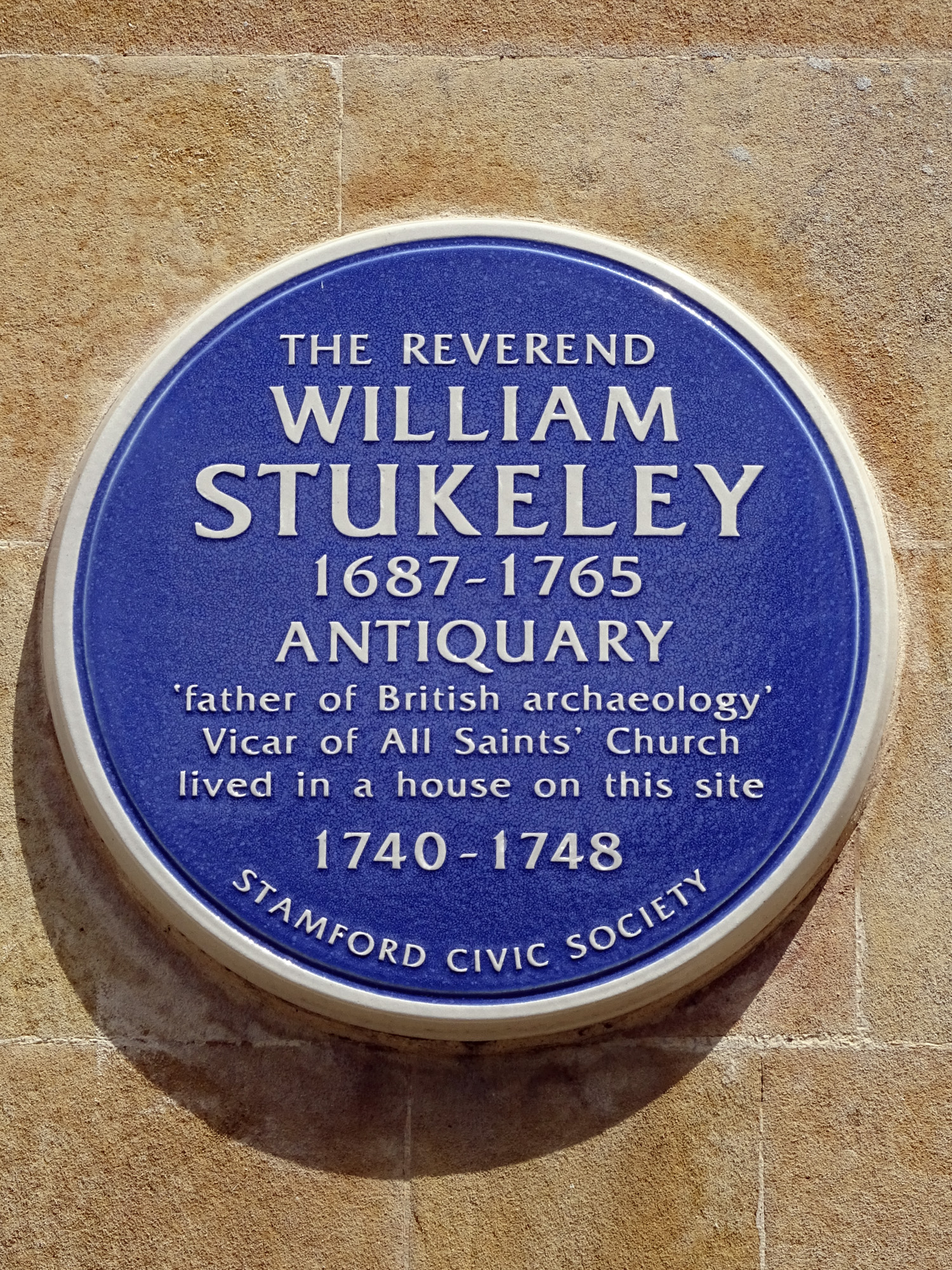
Blue plaque devoted to Stukeley erected in 2010 in Stamford, Lincolnshire

Piggott described Stukeley as "a gregarious creature" who enjoyed conversation and being flattered. Haycock referred to Stukeley's "amiable personality", while Piggott also highlighted "an immensely likeable quality" to Stukeley's personality, as evidence highlighting that when the reverend was laid up in bed in Queens Square on one occasion, over 120 friends and parishioners either visited him or sent him a message of sympathy. He also regarded the antiquary as displaying a "charm and pleasant oddness" as well as a "cheerfulness and disarming ingenuousness". Piggott also noted that in later life, Stukeley became "self-opinionated" and "dogmatic".

After the antiquarian's death, Bishop Warburton stated that in Stukeley displayed "a mixture of simplicity, drollery, absurdity, ingenuity, superstition and antiquarianism, that he afforded me that kind of well-seasoned repast, which the French call an Ambigu, I suppose from a compound of things never meant to meet together."

According to Hutton, Stukeley had "a profound and lifelong love of structure, form and design" that was reflected in his interest in the medieval profession as well as antiquities. He had an enthusiasm for gardening, and was fond of both city and countryside, enjoying the ability of traveling between the two. Fond of pets, he reported feeling great grief following the death of his cat, Tit, in the 1740s. While living in Boston, he aligned himself with the Tories. He suffered from gout, having his first attack of the disease in 1709.

Stukeley's decision, in 1722, to adopt the pseudonym of Chyndonax reflected his inclinations towards identifying with the druids in a personal capacity. This was bolstered by the tendency of friends in the Society of Roman Knights to refer to him, both in conversation and correspondence, as "the Druid".

By 1740, he was beginning to depict the stone circles at Avebury, which are circular, as ovals in his illustrations so that they better fitted the shape of a serpent's head, which he believed they symbolised.

== Reception and legacy ==
In Stukeley we see, thanks to a remarkable volume of evidence, the eighteenth-century antiquary larger than life-size. He is unrepresentative and yet representative: individual, eccentric, an 'original' but with all his characteristics no more than a slight exaggeration of those of his fellow antiquaries. He is almost a corporate sum of his contemporaries, with all their achievements and their intellectual crotchets concentrated and magnified in one man.

— Stuart Piggott, 1985

Haycock noted that Stukeley's books Stonehenge and Abury were well received, and that scholars "should not lose sight of his achievements behind the screen of his failings." He noted that Stukeley was "not a lone figure hypothesising wildly in his study" but "participating in a philosophical debate" that attracted the attention of various Enlightenment figures, including Newton, adding that Stukeley had established himself in "a firm position in London's intellectual society". By the early 1720s, Stukeley had a growing reputation as the country's main authority on druids and ancient monuments, having no obvious competitor given the comparative novelty of studying stone circles. However, by the 1750s, some of Stukeley's contemporaries were criticising the accuracy of some of his plans, and some were also accusing his interpretations of being speculative.

Haycock observed that Stukeley's "influence upon antiquarian studies for the century or so after his death" was "profound". For instance, in his 1796 book Indian Antiquities, Thomas Maurice drew upon Stukeley's publications as part of his argument that the druids were a group of Indian brahmins who had travelled west. According to Haycock, the "most famous propagator of Stukelian ideas in the early nineteenth century" was the artist and poet William Blake, who had read both Abury and Stonehenge and been influenced by them. In the nineteenth century, many of Stukeley's interpretations were being adopted and expanded by several antiquarian clergymen, including William Lisle Bowles, D. James and John Bathurst Deane. The Wiltshire archaeologist Richard Colt Hoare gave Stukeley's work some additional respectability when praising his use of fieldwork; Hoare concurred with Stukeley that sites like Stonehenge and Avebury were likely "Celtic" but did not endorse the idea that they were built by druids, believing that such information was unknowable.

By the third quarter of the nineteenth century, the tide had turned against Stukeley's ideas in British archaeological circles. In 1889, Augustus Pitt Rivers noted, in his presidential address to the Wiltshire Archaeological and Natural History Society, that Stukeley's name "has been handed down to us chiefly as an example of what to avoid in archaeology". According to his biographer, Stuart Piggott, Stukeley was the "central figure of early eighteenth-century archaeology". The historian Ronald Hutton called him "perhaps the most important forefather of the discipline of archaeology", while the archaeologist Paul Ashbee referred to Stukeley as "a pioneer unmatched in the history of archaeology".

The first edition of Piggott's biography of Stukeley was published in 1950, with a revised edition released in 1985. Piggott thought him "one of the most curious and complex of the English eccentrics, pathetic, charming, admirable, and laughable by turns." Piggott believed that Stukeley's folios of Avebury and Stonehenge were his "most important contributions to archaeology". He noted that the antiquarian's plan of Avebury, "though failing by modern standards of accuracy, was nevertheless a very much better achievement than anything that had been produced before". Piggott's ultimate assessment was that Stukeley "was not a good scholar: he was uncritical of his literary sources and his reading was discursive rather than profound. His value to archaeology in his own day and now lies in his capacity to observe and record facts in the open air." He situated Stukeley's intellectual failings within the wider context of British intellectual decline in the years following 1730.

Tied to a view of antiquity that dealt in thousands rather than millions of years, dedicated to a religious struggle he considered fundamental to the survival of society as he knew it, Stukeley's view of the past inevitably eventually became outdated. Yet so confident was he in his standpoint, that even when it came under increasing scrutiny in the final years of his life, he refused to waver.

— David Boyd Haycock, 2002

Piggott referred to the "varying quality" of Stukeley's work, believing there to have been a "lamentable decline in his later life". He believed that Stukeley had moved from a "neutral empiricism to an often wildly speculative religious interpretation" of prehistoric archaeology. In 2005, Hutton noted that there had been "a considerable change of attitude" to Stukeley among scholars over the previous few years, as they had rejected the division into two halves of his life which Piggott had constructed.

Stukeley was the first person to identify the Stonehenge Avenue and Stonehenge Cursus, giving these features the names by which they are now known.

Piggott noted that Stukeley's speculations on druids, "which seem to us so childishly fantastic", shaped the literary mood of the romantic revival. Haycock noted that, along with Macpherson and Thomas Gray, Stukeley "helped create the principal historical and literary foundations for the 'Druidical revival' that flourished in the last decades of the eighteenth century".

== Bibliography ==
A bibliography of Stukeley's published work was published in the 2002 biography by Haycock:

Year of publication	Title	Publishing location
1720	An Account of a Roman Temple, and other Antiquities, near Graham's Dike in Scotland	London
1722	On the Spleen, its Description and History, Uses and Diseases... To which is Added Some Anatomical Observations in the Dissection of an Elephant	London
1723	Of the Roman Amphitheater at Dorchester	London
1724	Itinerarium Curiosum, Or, An Account of the Antiquitys and Remarkable Curiositys in Nature or Art, Observ'd in Travels thro' Great Brittan. Illustrated with Copper Prints. Centuria I	London
1733	A Letter to Sir Hans Sloane, Bart. President of the College of Pbibliography: Stukeley's Principal Manuscriptphysicians, London, And of the Royal Society; About the Cure of the Gout, By Oils externally apply'd	London
1735	Of the Gout	Dublin
1736	Palaeographia Sacra: Or, Discourses on Monuments of Antiquity that Relate to Sacred History. Number 1. A Comment on an Ode of Horace, Shewing the Bacchus of the Heathen to be the Jehovah of the Jews	London
1740	Stonehenge: A Temple Restor'd to the British Druids	London
1742	National Judgements the Consequence of a National Profanation of the Sabbath. A Sermon Preached before the Honourable House of Commons, at St Margaret's, Westminster	London
1743	Abury: A Temple of the British Druids	London
1743	Palaeographia Britannica: Or, Discourses on Antiquities in Britain. Number I	London
1746	Palaeographia Britannica: Or, Discourses on Antiquities in Britain. Number II	Stamford
1750	The Philosophy of Earthquakes, Natural and Religious	London
1750	The Healing of Disease, A Character of the Messiah: A Sermon	London
1752	Palaeographia Britannica: Or, Discourses on Antiquities in Britain. Number III	London
1756	The Philosophy of Earthquakes, Natural and Religious, third edition	London
1757	The Medallic History of Marcus Aurelius Valerius Carausius, Emperor in Britain, Volume I	London
1757	An Account of Richard of Cirencester, Monk of Westminster, and of his Works: With his Antient Map of Roman Britain; And the Itinerary Thereof	London
1759	The Medallic History of Marcus Aurelius Valerius Carausius, Emperor in Britain, Volume II	London
1763	Palaeographia Sacra. Or, Discourses on Sacred Subjects	London
1763	A Letter from Dr Stukeley to Mr MacPherson, On his Publication of Fingal and Temora, With a Print of Cathmor's Shield	London
1776	Itinerarium Curiosum, Or, An Account of the Antiquitys and Remarkable Curiositys in Nature or Art, Observ'd in Travels thro' Great Brittan. Centuria 2	London
1882	The Family Memoirs Volume I	Surtees Society vol. lxxiii
1883	The Family Memoirs Volume II	Surtees Society vol. lxxvi
1887	The Family Memoirs Volume III	Surtees Society vol. lxxx
1936	Memoirs of Sir Isaac Newton's Life	London
1980	The Commentarys, Diary, and Common-Place Book of William Stukeley	London

== Sources ==
- Brown, Cornelius (1904). History of Newark-on-Trent; being the life story of an ancient town. Vol. II. Newark: Whiles.
- Haycock, David Boyd (2004). "Stukeley, William (1687–1765)". Oxford Dictionary of National Biography (online ed.). Oxford University Press. doi:10.1093/ref:odnb/26743. (Subscription, Wikipedia Library access or UK public library membership required.) The first edition of this text is available at Wikisource: Lee, Sidney, ed. (1898). "Stukeley, William" . Dictionary of National Biography. Vol. 55. London: Smith, Elder & Co.

Attribution:
