= The Description of Britain =

Literary forgery by Charles Bertram

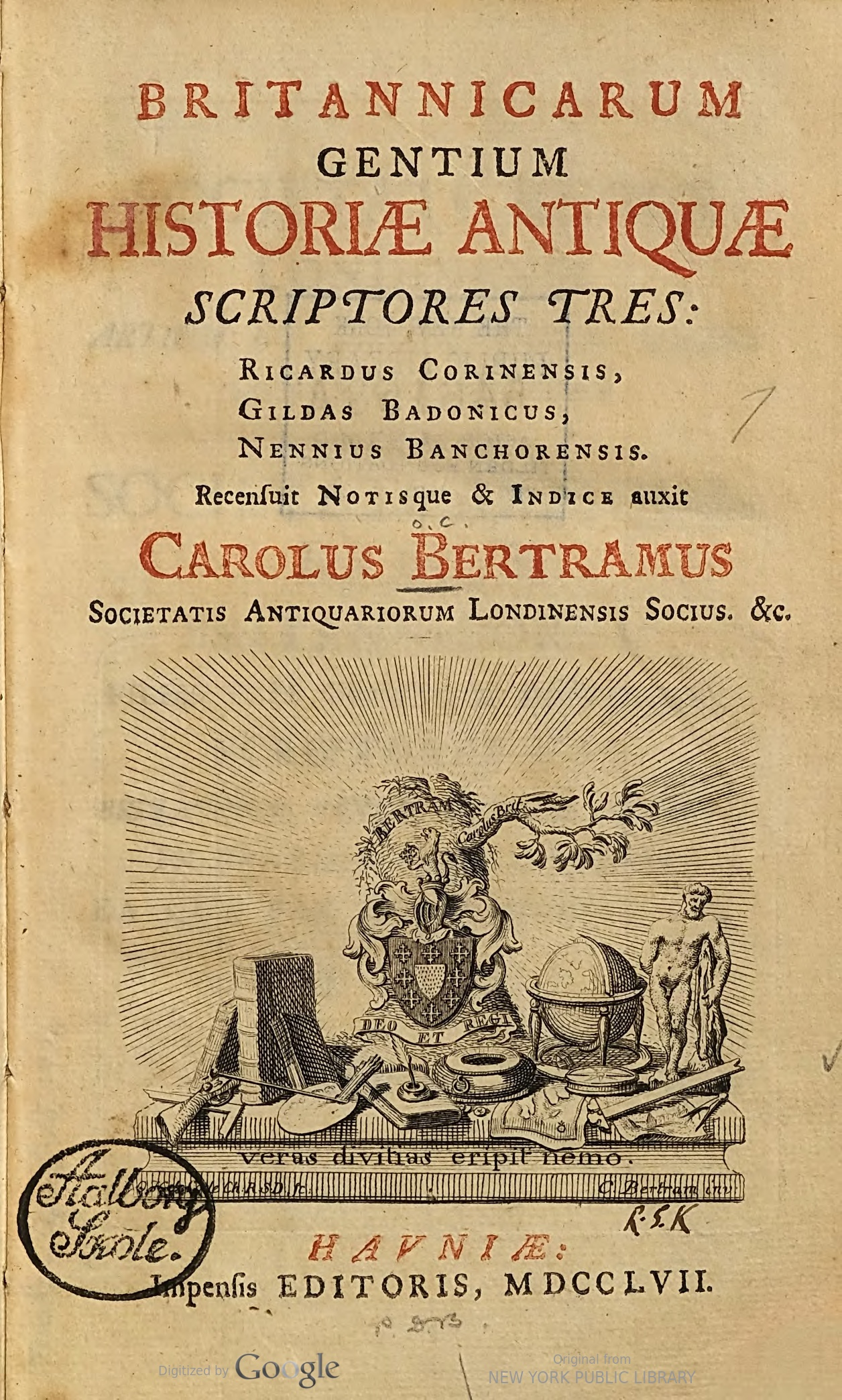
- Title page of Britannicarum Gentium Historiae Antiquae Scriptores Tres (1757), the first publication to include De Situ Britanniae
- Author: Pseudo-Richard of Cirencester (Charles Bertram)
- Original title: Ricardi Corinensis Monachi Westmonasteriensis De Situ Britanniæ Libri Duo
- Translator: Henry Hatcher; J. A. Giles
- Language: Latin
- Subject: Ancient British History
- Genre: Literary forgery
- Publisher: Ludolph Henrich Lillie
- Publication date: 1757
- Publication place: Denmark
- English publication date: 1809
- Media type: Print (Hardcover)
- Pages: 81 (Note: Bertram's 1757 Three Authors comprised 144 pages of text, along with 99 pages of preface, notes, indices, etc. Pseudo-Richard's text ran for 60 pages and was accompanied by 21 pages of notes in Latin.)

The Description of Britain, also known by its Latin name De Situ Britanniae ("On the Situation of Britain"), was a literary forgery perpetrated by Charles Bertram on the historians of England. It purported to be a 15th-century manuscript by the English monk Richard of Westminster, including information from a lost contemporary account of Britain by a Roman general (dux), new details of the Roman roads in Britain in the style of the Antonine Itinerary, and "an antient [sic] map" as detailed as (but improved upon) the works of Ptolemy. Bertram disclosed the existence of the work through his correspondence with the antiquarian William Stukeley by 1748, provided him "a copy" which was made available in London by 1749, and published it in Latin in 1757. By this point, his Richard had become conflated with the historical Richard of Cirencester. The text was treated as a legitimate and major source of information on Roman Britain from the 1750s through the 19th century, when it was progressively debunked by John Hodgson, Karl Wex, B. B. Woodward, and John E. B. Mayor. Effects from the forgery can still be found in works on British history and it is generally credited with having named the Pennine Mountains.

== "Discovery" ==
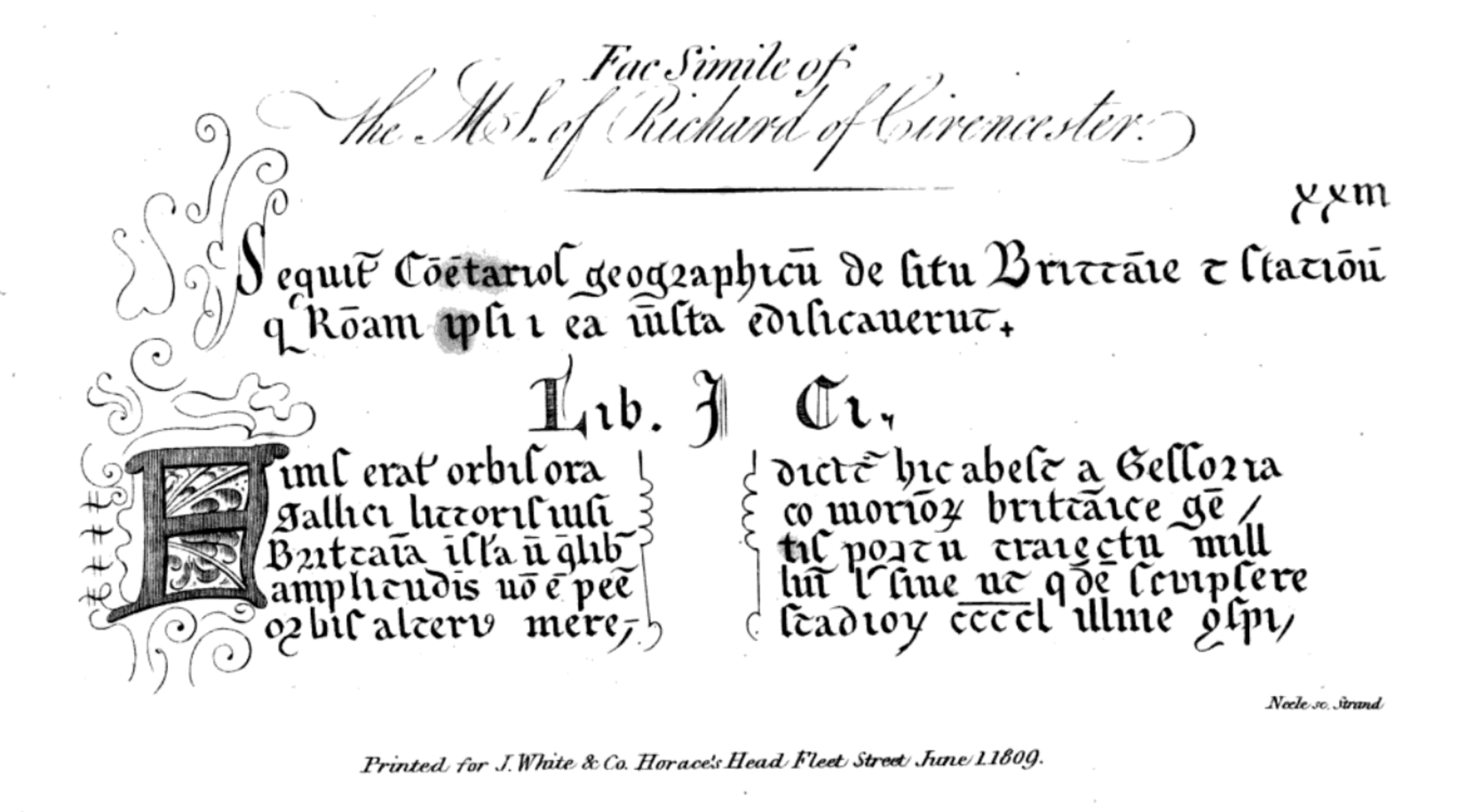
Bertram's facsimile of the first page of De Situ Britanniae, with the notes added for Hatcher's 1809 edition.

Charles Bertram was an English expatriate living in Copenhagen who began a flattering correspondence with the antiquarian William Stukeley in 1747 and was vouched for by Hans Gram, the royal librarian to King Frederick V. After a few further letters, Bertram mentioned "a manuscript in a friend's hands of Richard of Westminster,... a history of Roman Brittain... and an antient map of the island annex'd." A "copy" of its script was shown to David Casley, the keeper of the Cotton Library, who "immediately" described it as around 400 years old. Stukeley thereafter always treated Bertram as reliable. He "press'd Mr Bertram to get the manuscript into his hands, if possible... as the greatest treasure we now can boast of in this kind of learning." Stukeley received the text piecemeal over a series of letters which he made available at the Royal Society's Arundel Library in London in 1749. He had received a drawing of Bertram's map by early 1750, which he also placed at the library.

== Authorship ==
Bertram described his text's author as "Richard, monk of Westminster" (Latin: Ricardus monachus Westmonasteriensis). There had been a monk named Richard at Westminster Abbey in the mid-15th century and this was the approximate date offered by Bertram to Stukeley. Stukeley preferred instead to identify Bertram's "Richard of Westminster" with Richard of Cirencester (Ricardus de Cirencestria), who had lived at Westminster in the late 14th century and was known to have journeyed to Rome and to have compiled another history known as the Historial Mirror. Bertram fully adopted the suggestion and published his account under the name Ricardus Corinensis, from the archaic Latin form of Cirencester's name.

It has since become clear that the text was the work of an 18th-century forger. Bertram claimed to have borrowed the text from a friend who admitted he had come by it as an act of theft from an English library. Its complete absence from other manuscript lists and the lack of any trace of it among Bertram's surviving papers in Copenhagen has generally led to the conclusion that Bertram himself was Pseudo-Richard.

== Text ==
Stukeley read his analysis of the work and its itineraries before the Society of Antiquaries and published his paper with its extracts in 1757. He was excited that the text provided "more than a hundred names of cities, roads, people, and the like: which till now were absolutely unknown to us" and found it written "with great judgment, perspicuity, and conciseness, as by one that was altogether master of his subject". His account of the itineraries included an engraving reorienting Bertram's map to place north at the top.

Later in 1757, (Note: This is the usual dating, derived from the volume's title page. In fact, the colophon shows the edition was actually printed in 1758.) at Stukeley's urging, Bertram published the full text in a volume alongside Gildas's Ruin of Britain and the History of the Britons traditionally ascribed to Nennius. The collection, in Latin, was titled Britannicarum gentium historiae antiquae scriptores tres (Three writers of ancient histories of the British nations). Bertram's preface noted that the work "contains many fragments of a better time, which would now in vain be sought for elsewhere". (Note: Latin: Longe melioris ævi multos pannos purpuræ, & fragmenta egregia continet, quæ singula frustra albi quæsiveris...) The preface goes on to note that, "considered by Dr. Stukeley... a jewel... worthy to be rescued from destruction", Bertram printed it "from respect for him". (Note: Latin: Opusculum ipsum quod attinet, a Domino supra nominato, & singulis, quibus videre contigit, habitum est κειμήλιον, dignum, quod impressum ab interitu liberetur. Reverentiam erga ipsum quodammodo testandi gratia, imprimi illud curavi.) The volume included a map as well, differing from Stukeley's in several features apart from its orientation.

It contained 18 routes (Latin: itinera) of the type found in the Antonine Itinerary, (Note: These are excerpted and compared with other sources in Dyer.) compiled from fragmentary accounts of a Roman general, adding over 60 new and previously unknown stations to those mentioned in the legitimate account. Best of all, it filled up the entire map of Scotland with descriptions and the names of peoples, the part of Britain about which the least was known with any certainty. It would later be determined that it was actually a clever mosaic of information gleaned from the works of Caesar, Tacitus, William Camden, John Horsley, and others, enhanced with Bertram's own fictions.

== Map ==
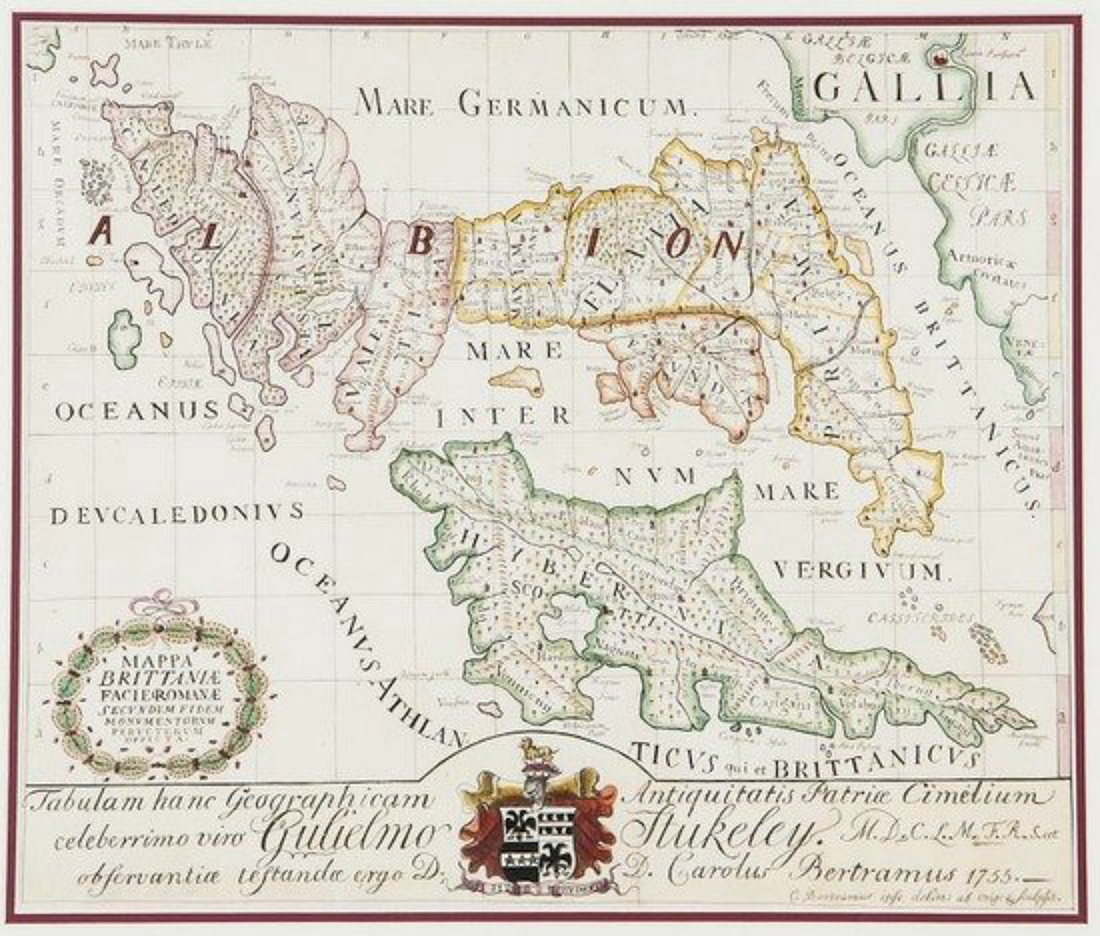
Bertram's 1755 engraved map.

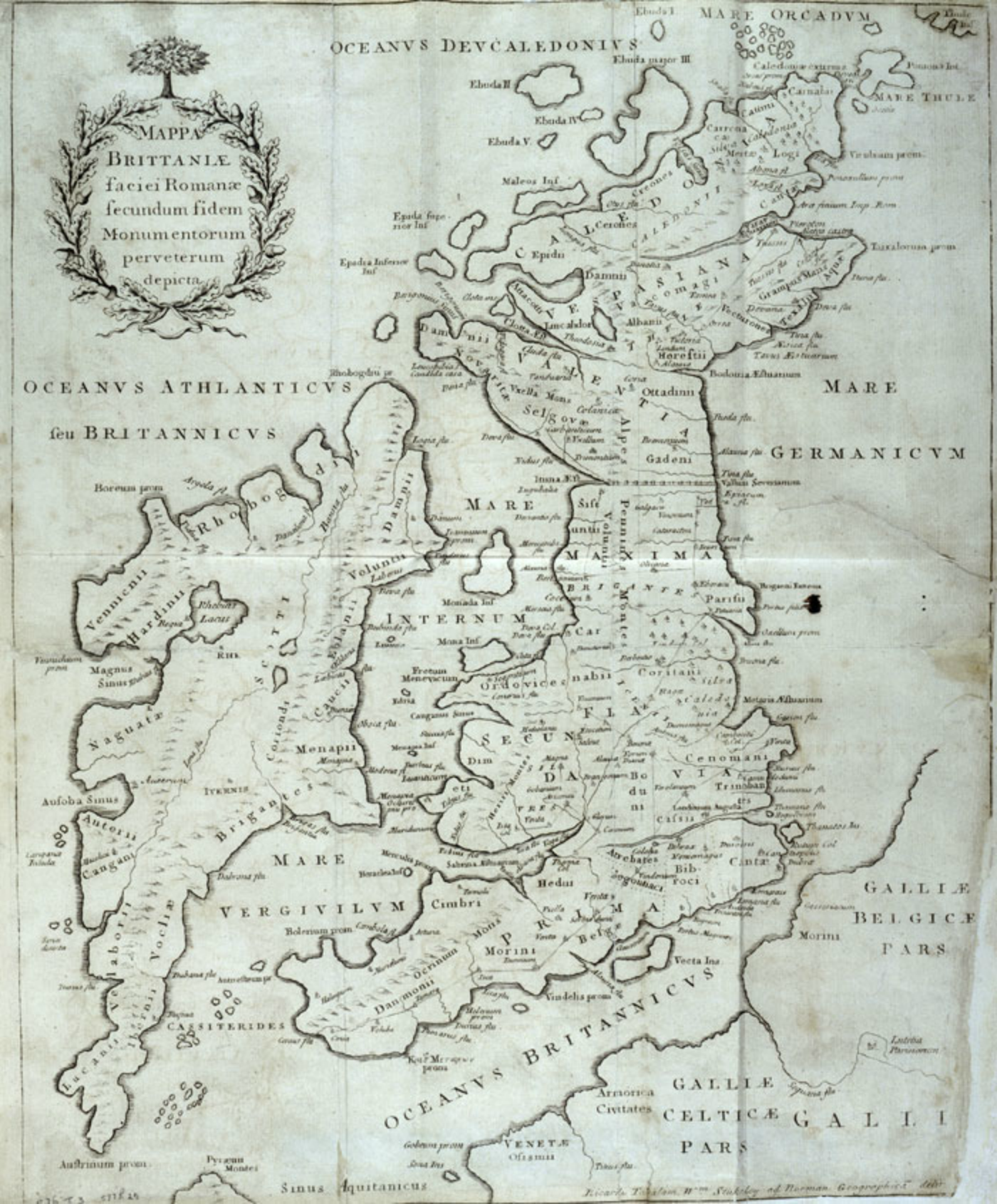
Stukeley's 1757 revision, cleaning up the text and reoriented to face north.

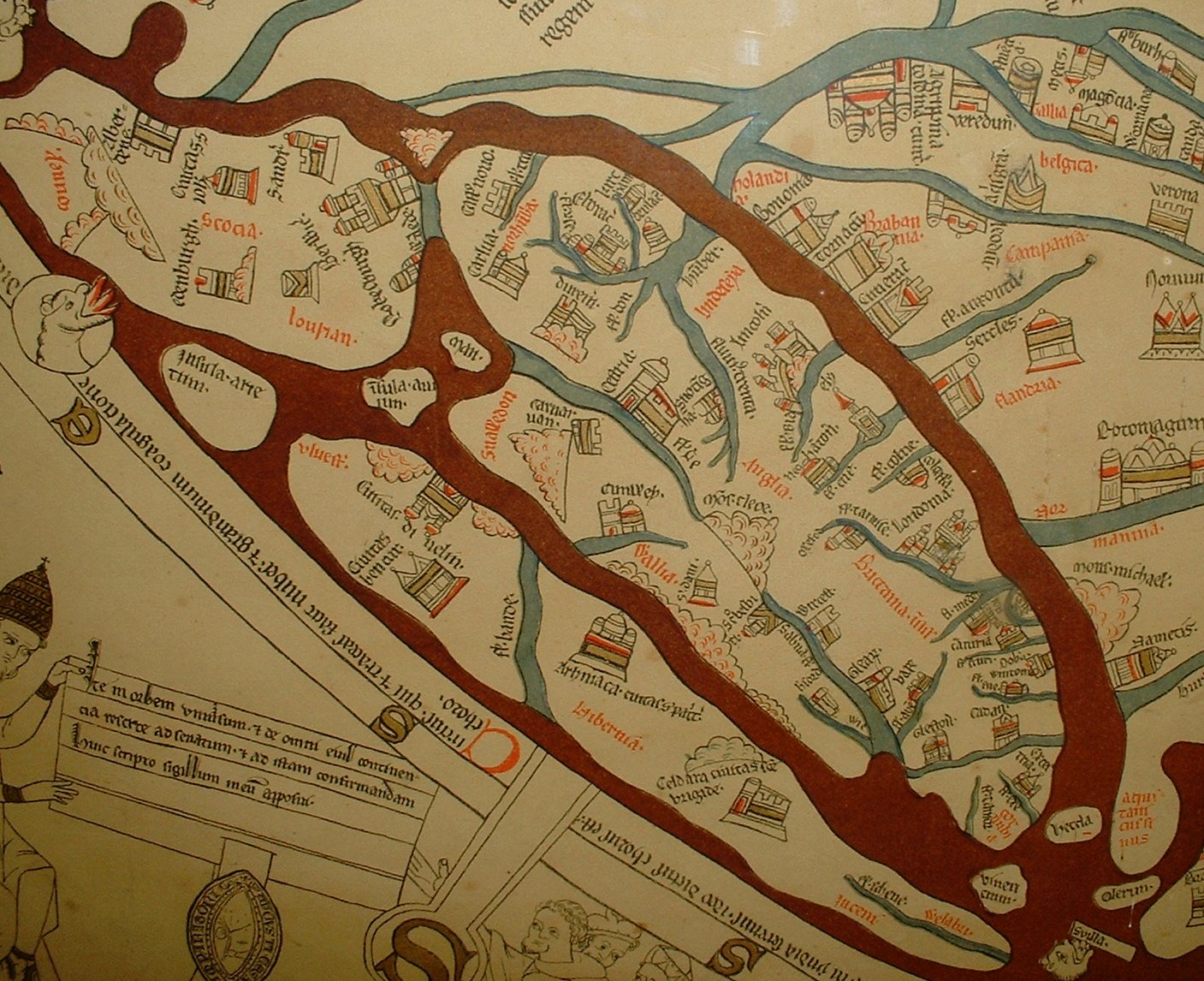
A redrawn British section of the genuine Hereford Mappa Mundi, c. 1300.

Bertram's letters to Stukeley proposed that the map accompanying the text was even older than Pseudo-Richard's text. His letters state that he bought a copperplate to engrave it himself. Either this original copperplate or a freehand drawing was sent to Stukeley in late 1749 or early 1750 and formed the basis of the version reoriented and published by Stukeley in his 1757 Account.

Bertram's own engraving appeared in his 1757 Three Authors but was dated to 1755. It retained the "original" map's orientation, placing east at the top of the map, but did not disguise that Bertram had tidied it up. It is inscribed with a note that it was engraved and done entirely by Bertram. Stukeley later employed this version for the 2nd edition of his own Itinerarium Curiosum, published posthumously in 1776.

== Reception ==
=== Acceptance ===
Once it had been accepted as genuine, The Description of Britain exerted a profound effect upon subsequent theories, suppositions, and publications of history. It was the premier source of information—sometimes the only source—for well over 100 years.

Contemporary authoritative works include Gibbon's Decline and Fall of the Roman Empire, which is well-footnoted with his sources of information. De Situ Britanniae appears among his references to sources on ancient Britain, usually cited to its emended author, Richard of Cirencester. Major-General William Roy's technical ability at surveying was the inspiration for the creation of the Ordnance Survey. He spent much of his research on ancient Scottish history trying to follow the fictional itineraries described in De Situ Britanniae. His historical work, Military Antiquities of the Romans in Britain, relies on the forgery and is consequently deficient as a contribution to history, though his maps are still held in the highest regard. William Forbes Skene, in his introduction to Celtic Scotland, written after De Situ Britanniae was debunked, disparaged several once-influential histories that relied on it, including Pinkerton's Enquiry, Chalmers's Caledonia, Roy's Military Antiquities, and Robert Stuart's Caledonia Romana.

No serious modern historian cites an argument based on the fictional De Situ Britanniae, but conclusions based upon it are still cited indirectly. For example, the influential and respected Barry Cunliffe's Iron Age Communities in Britain places the ancient Selgovae people far to the east of their only known location, contradicting their placement by the sole legitimate source, Ptolemy. This misplacement relied on William Roy's attempt to make the map of the peoples of ancient Scotland fit De Situ Britanniae.

=== Debunking ===
Enough doubts had arisen by 1838 that the English Historical Society did not include The Description of Britain in its list of important historical works. Still, the end did not come until 1845. In that year the German writer Friedrich Carl Wex effectively challenged the authority of the Description in the Rheinisches Museum. He had been working on a new edition of Tacitus's Agricola. Consulting the Description, he found that it included impossible transcription errors that had been introduced to editions of Tacitus by Venetian printers in the 15th century. His work was translated into English and printed by the Gentleman's Magazine in October 1846.

British scholars were slow to accept the truth. Some of the routes mentioned by the work had seemed to have been subsequently borne out, and excuses were made for the known errors. Further evidence of the falsity of The Description of Britain came out in the following years, however, until no serious effort could be made in defence of the document. Bertram had on several occasions adopted variant readings and hypotheses unknown before Camden. Scholars continued to hem both out of embarrassment (the same information that Wex used had been available to them all along) and because they now knew that their accounts of history had been based on a fiction rather than legitimate information. The final confirmation that the Description was spurious came in 1869, a quarter century after Wex's publication. As part of the Rolls Series, the Historial Mirror written by the real Richard of Cirencester (his only surviving work) was closely examined over the 1860s by J.E.B. Mayor, the librarian of the University of Cambridge. In his 1869 preface to the second volume of the work, he included a thorough 90-page condemnation of Bertram's manuscript. Blame fell hardest on the reputation of William Stukeley, although it also impugned Gibbon, Roy, and other scholars who had accepted it.

=== Revisionism ===
Once the work was no longer defensible, various accounts came forward claiming that there had been serious doubts about the Description prior to Wex. These were somewhat less than accurate. In general, they attempted to conflate earlier concerns about "Richard of Cirencester"'s supposed sources or about his use of his sources with the more fundamental questions raised by Wex. An example is the 1911 Encyclopædia Britannica account, which asserts that Thomas Reynolds was "sceptical as to the value of Bertram's manuscript". Reynolds had been sceptical of the quality of Richard of Cirencester's information, but did not express any doubts about Bertram or the validity of the manuscript. Another tack of latter reviewers was to downplay the magnitude of the earlier acceptance and reliance on the Description. In 1866 and 1867, B.B. Woodward, the librarian of Windsor Castle, wrote a series of articles for the Gentleman's Magazine that challenged the validity of the text. However, his characterisation of The Description of Britain as "plainly a clumsy forgery by an unpractised hand" is unfair. This same document had been examined in 1749 by David Casley, the keeper of the Cotton Library, and as late as 1840 Sir Frederic Madden of the manuscript department of the British Museum had not only expressed his belief in its validity but also criticised the English Historical Society for its omission of the Description of Britain in its 1838 list of important works.

Many of the errors propounded in the Description were still unchallenged in the early twentieth century, when Thomas Codrington criticised those errors retained by the Ordnance Survey in his book Roman Roads in Britain (1903).

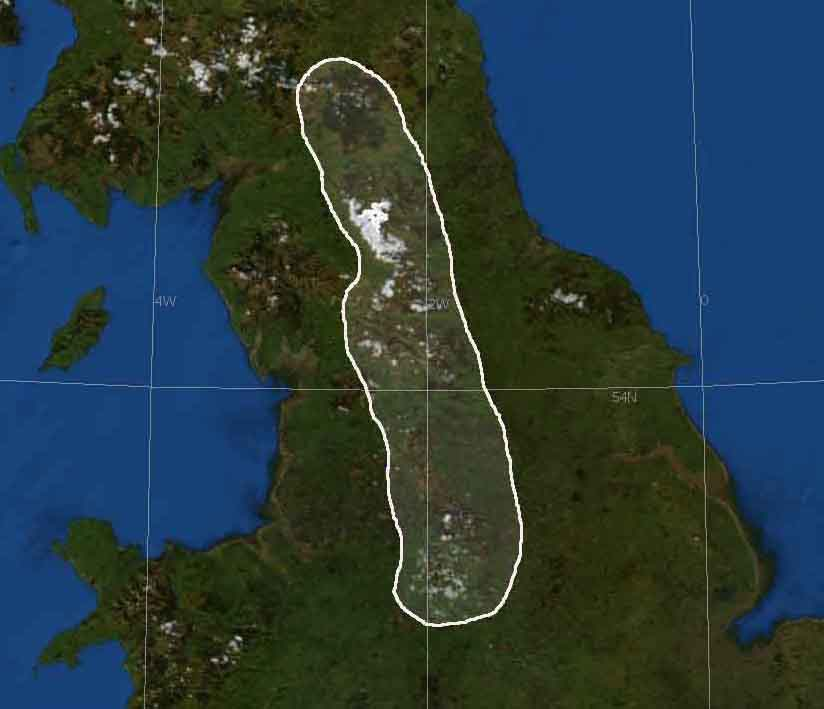
The Pennines, the ‘backbone of England’

== Legacy ==
Thanks to Roy and others' reliance on the Description, a number of its inventions found their way onto the Ordnance Survey maps. Another example of the Description’s legacy were continuing references—including in the 1911 Encyclopædia Britannica—to a naval base at Dumbarton named Theodosia, long after its sole authority had been debunked.

A passage in Bertram was credited in 1853 by Arthur Hussey as originating the name of the Pennines. In 2004, George Redmonds reassessed this, finding that numerous respected writers passed over the origin of the mountains' name in silence even in works dedicated to the topographical etymology of Derbyshire and Lancashire. He found that the derivation from Bertram was widely believed and considered uncomfortable. In fact, the name appears at least as early as Camden as a variant of the Apennines in Italy, and Bertram was responsible (at most) with popularizing it against other contenders such as Defoe's "English Andes".
