= Gilbert Dyer =

English antiquary and bookseller (1743–1820)

- Born: 14 September 1743; Dunstone, Widecombe-in-the-Moor, Devon, England
- Died: 19 October 1820 (aged 77); Exeter, England
- Occupations: Bookseller, antiquarian writer
- Notable work: The Principles of Atheism proved to be unfounded from the Nature of Man; A Restoration of the Ancient Modes of bestowing Names on the Rivers, Hills, &c. of Britain; Vulgar Errors, Ancient and Modern
- Spouse(s): Sarah Sayer (m. 1772); Sarah Finnemore (m. 1789)
- Children: 2

Gilbert Dyer (1743–1820) was an English bookseller, known also as an antiquarian writer.

== Life ==
The son of Gilbert Dyer, a schoolmaster on the eastern side of Dartmoor, he was born in the hamlet of Dunstone in the parish of Widecombe-in-the-Moor, Devon, and baptised on 14 September 1743. After working as his father's assistant, he was appointed in June 1767 master of the school at Tucker's Hall, Exeter, and was there for 21 years.

About 1788 Dyer opened a bookseller's shop opposite the Guildhall in Exeter, and soon became prominent in the trade, in the west of England. He was noted for catalogues and a circulating library. William Hone remarked on their impressive warehouse of theology.

Until a few days before his death Dyer seemed in good health, but he succumbed to a fever. He died at Exeter on 19 October 1820.

== Works ==
Dyer published in 1796 an anonymous tract The Principles of Atheism proved to be unfounded from the Nature of Man, in which he aimed at establishing that man "must have been created, preserved, and instructed by Divine Providence". A Restoration of the Ancient Modes of bestowing Names on the Rivers, Hills, &c. of Britain (reissued 1805) traced place and river names back to Celtic origins. Dyer's subsequent work Vulgar Errors, Ancient and Modern (1816) contained the 1796 tract on atheism, and commentaries on Richard of Cirencester and Antoninus, which had been published in 1814. It also drew on speculations he had contributed to the Monthly Magazine in 1809.

== Family ==
Dyer was twice married: first, on 19 July 1772, to Sarah Sayer of the Cathedral Close, Exeter, by whom he had two children, Sarah, baptised at the cathedral 25 February 1775, and Gilbert, baptised 9 June 1776; and second, in 1789, to Sarah Finnemore of Exeter, who seems to have died on 24 October 1811, aged 83.

== Notes ==
Attribution

This article incorporates text from a publication now in the public domain: Stephen, Leslie, ed. (1888). "Dyer, Gilbert". Dictionary of National Biography. Vol. 16. London: Smith, Elder & Co.
