= Charles Bertram =

British literary forger (1723–1765)

- Born: 1723; London, England, Great Britain
- Died: 8 January 1765 (aged 41–42); Copenhagen, Denmark–Norway
- Occupations: Academic; Presumed forger
- Spouse: Cathrine Gold
- Writing career
- Notable works: Britannicarum Gentium Historiæ Antiquæ Scriptores Tres (The Description of Britain)

Charles Julius Bertram (1723 – 8 January 1765) was an English expatriate in Denmark who "discovered"—and presumably wrote—The Description of Britain (Latin: De Situ Britanniae), an 18th-century literary forgery purporting to be a mediaeval work on history that remained undetected for over a century. In that time, it was highly influential for the reconstruction of the history of Roman Britain and contemporary Scotland, to the extent of appearing in Edward Gibbon's Decline and Fall of the Roman Empire and being used to direct William Roy's initial Ordnance Survey maps. Bertram "discovered" the manuscript around the age of 24 and spent the rest of his life a successful academic and author. Scholars contested various aspects of the Description, but it was not recognized as unquestionably a forgery until 1846.

== Early life ==
Charles Bertram was born in London in 1723. He was the son of an English silk dyer who was usually accounted to have emigrated to Copenhagen, Denmark, among the retinue of Princess Louisa, a daughter of George II, upon her marriage to Crown Prince Frederick of Denmark in 1743. (The prince became King Frederick V three years later.) Other sources suggest the father immigrated earlier, in 1738. The father established himself as a hosier in 1744, and Charles seems to have benefited from the warm reception that Louisa and her retinue received from the Danes. On 5 July 1747, Charles petitioned the University of Copenhagen's Consortium for admission to study history, antiquities, philosophy, and mathematics. This seems to have been granted, although students were generally required to adhere to the Danish Church and Bertram remained Anglican. He became a friend and protégé of Hans Gram, the royal librarian and a member of the privy council. On 23 March 1748, Bertram petitioned the king to be permitted to give public lectures on the English language and became a teacher of English in the Royal Marine Academy in Copenhagen. (Some accounts name him as a professor, rather than a tutor; if so, that status would have been granted some years later, as he was a new undergraduate in 1747.) His 1749 chrestomathy An Essay on the Excellency and Style of the English Tongue has been called the initiation of English-language printing in Denmark. A brother apparently died at sea in 1752, and at some point he married Cathrine Marie Gold.

== The Description of Britain ==
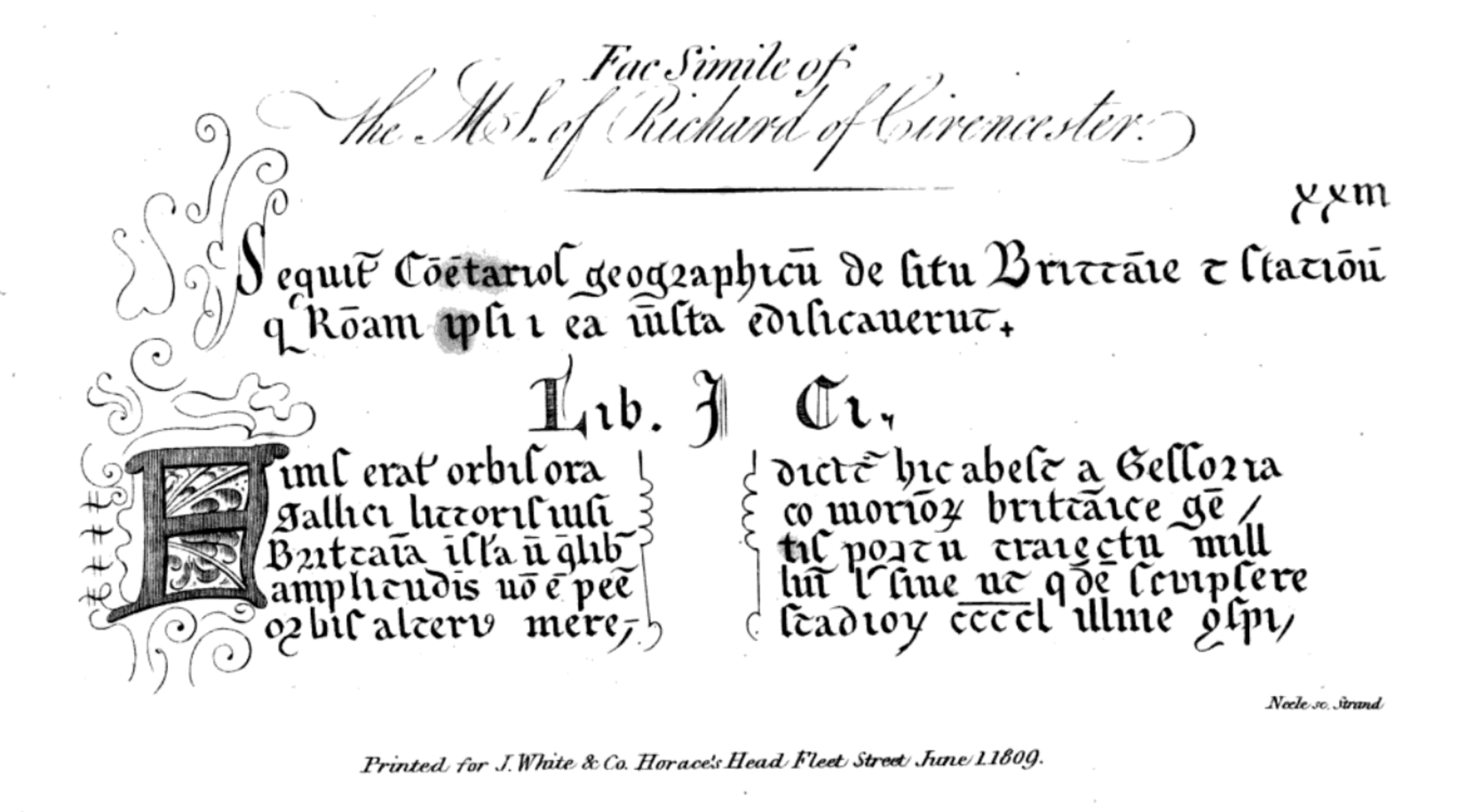
Bertram's "facsimile" of the work's first page

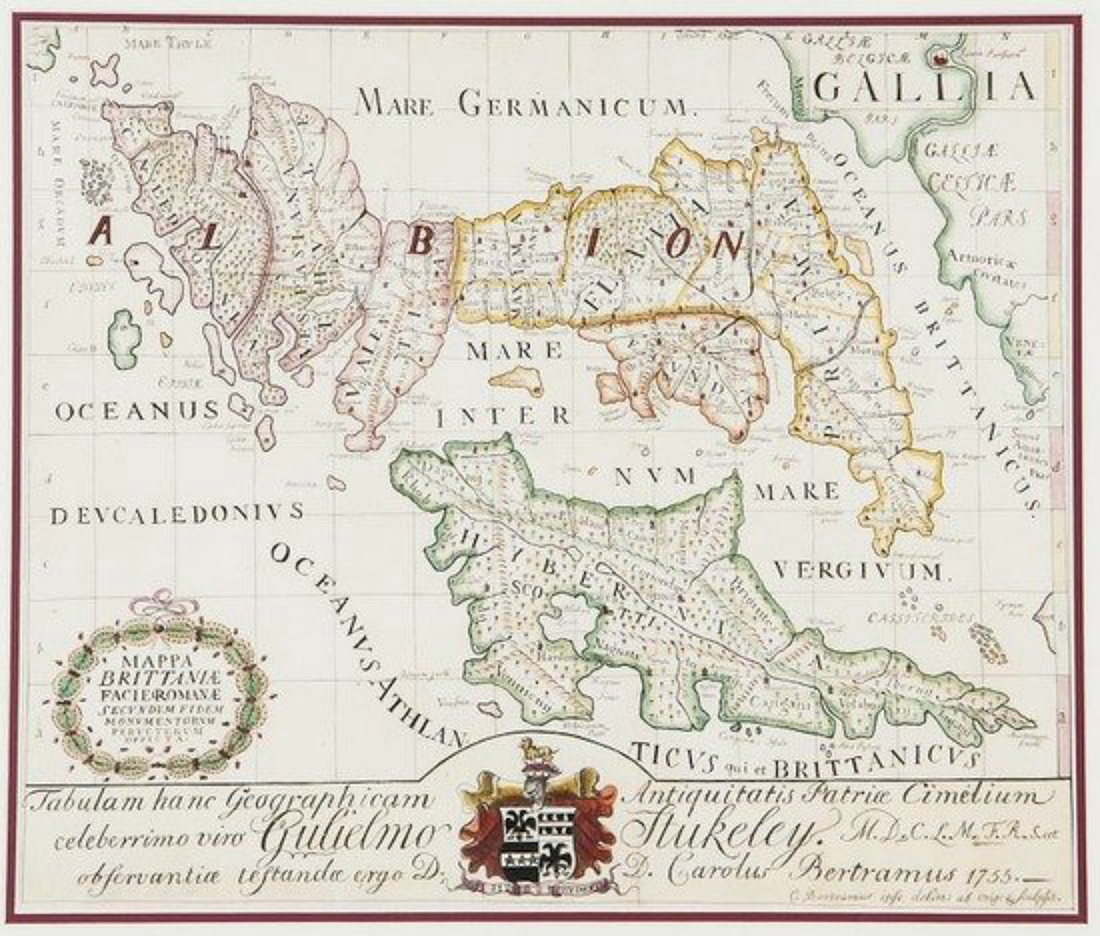
Bertram's 1755 engraved map

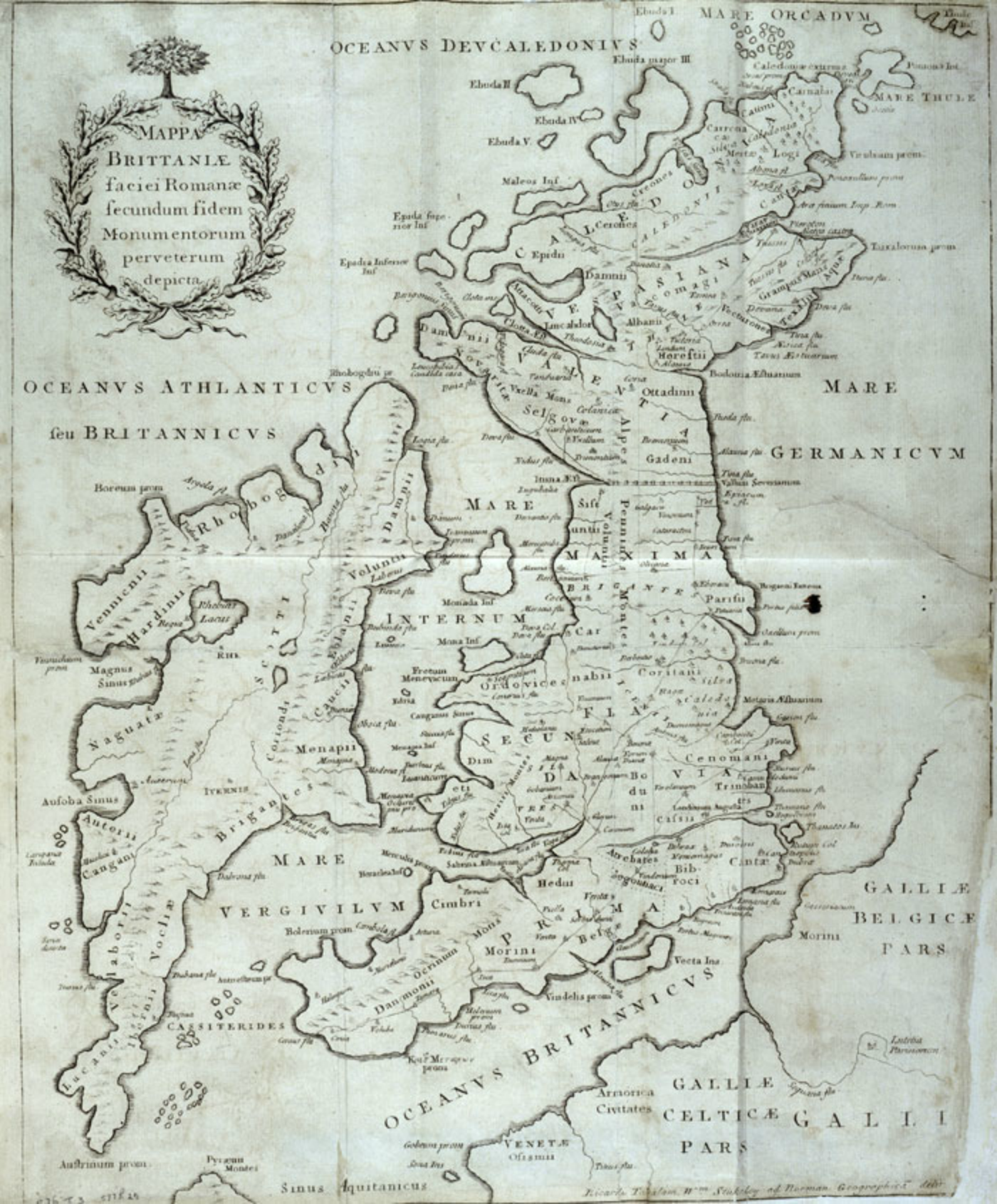
William Stukeley’s 1757 map, based on a drawing sent by Bertram by early 1750, cleaned up and reoriented to face north

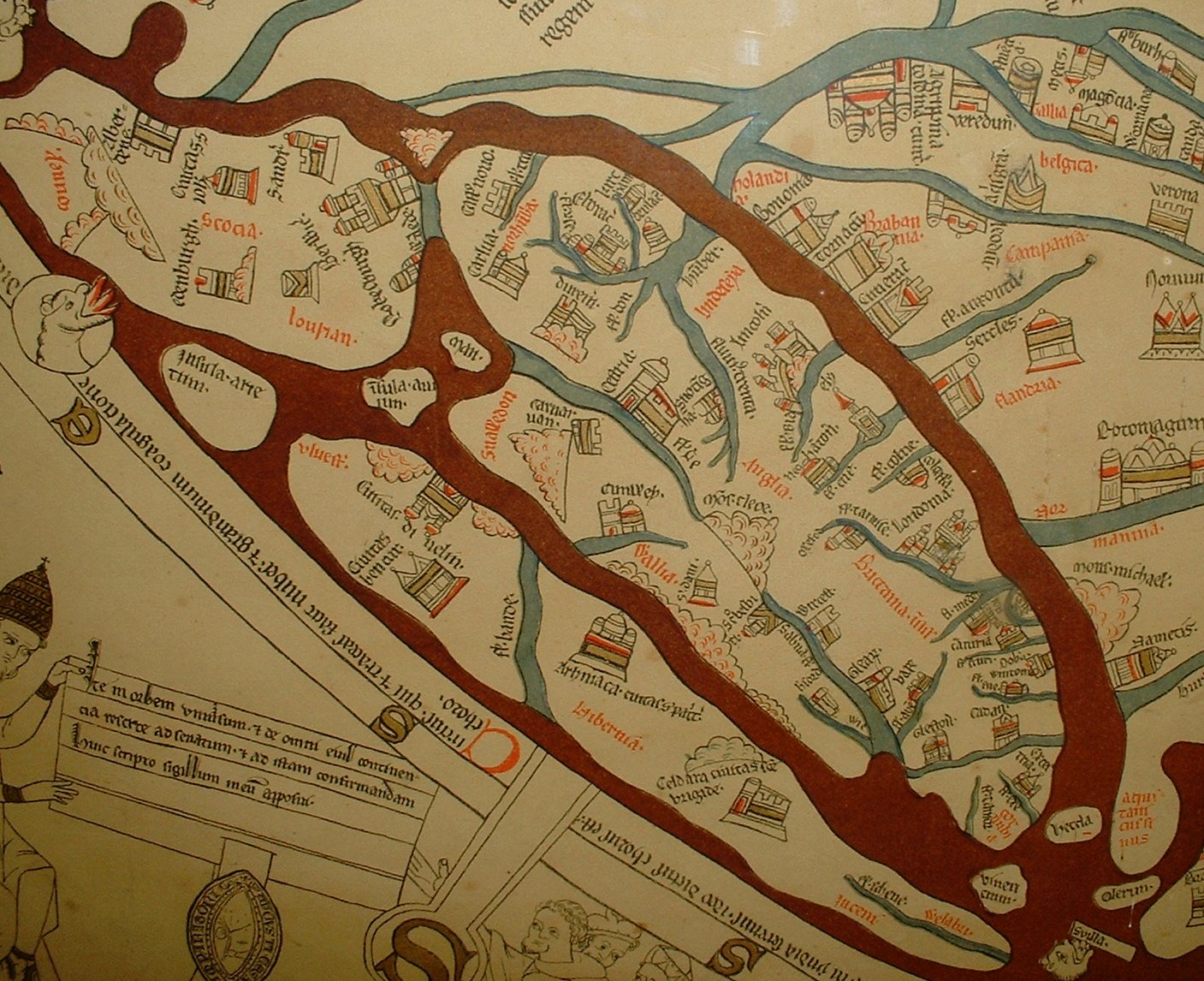
A redrawn section of the genuine Hereford Mappa Mundi, c. 1300

In 1746, Bertram composed a letter to the English antiquarian William Stukeley on Gram's recommendation. He hesitated sending it and Stukeley did not receive it until 11 June 1747. He found it "full of compliments, as usual with foreigners", and his reply brought a "prolix and elaborate Latin epistle" from Gram in Bertram's favour. Gram was widely known and respected in English universities. After a few further letters, Bertram mentioned "a manuscript in a friend's hands of Richard of Westminster, ... a history of Roman Brittain ... and an antient map of the island annex'd." He eventually "confessed" that another Englishman, "wild in his youth, had stolen it out of a larger manuscript in an English Library", permitting its use to Bertram upon his promise of secrecy. Stukeley was considering retirement but, receiving a new position in London and hearing of Gram's death, he renewed the correspondence and received a "copy" of its script made by Bertram. David Casley, the keeper of the Cotton Library, "immediately" described it as around 400 years old. Stukeley thereafter always treated Bertram as reliable. He "press'd Mr Bertram to get the manuscript into his hands, if possible ... as the greatest treasure we now can boast of in this kind of learning." Bertram refused his attempts to purchase the original manuscript for the British Museum, but Stukeley had received copies of the text piecemeal over a series of letters and had a version of the map by early 1750. Beale Poste noted that the volume appeared in no manuscript catalogues of the era but offered that it could have been stolen at the time of the Cotton Library's fire in 1732. There had been a monk named Richard at Westminster Abbey in the mid-15th century and Bertram suggested this date to Stukeley. Stukeley preferred instead to identify Bertram's "Richard of Westminster" with Richard of Cirencester, who had lived at Westminster in the late 14th century and was known to have compiled another history. Stukeley made the text and map available at the Arundel Library of the Royal Society.

Stukeley examined the text for years before reading his analysis of the work and its itineraries before the Society of Antiquaries in 1756 and publishing its itineraries in 1757. He was excited that the text provided "more than a hundred names of cities, roads, people, and the like: which till now were absolutely unknown to us" and found it written "with great judgment, perspicuity, and conciseness, as by one that was altogether master of his subject". His account of the itineraries included a new engraving, reorienting Bertram's map to place north at the top. Later in 1757, (Note: This is the usual dating, derived from the volume's title page. In fact, the colophon shows the edition was actually printed in 1758.) at Stukeley's urging, Bertram published the full text in a volume alongside Gildas's Ruin of Britain, and the History of the Britons traditionally ascribed to Nennius. Bertram's preface noted that the work "contains many fragments of a better time, which would now in vain be sought for elsewhere". (Note: Latin: Longe melioris ævi multos pannos purpuræ, & fragmenta egregia continet, quæ singula frustra albi quæsiveris ...) The preface goes on to note that, "considered by Dr. Stukeley ... a jewel ... worthy to be rescued from destruction", Bertram printed it "from respect for him". (Note: Latin: Opusculum ipsum quod attinet, a Domino supra nominato, & singulis, quibus videre contigit, habitum est κειμήλιον, dignum, quod impressum ab interitu liberetur. Reverentiam erga ipsum quodammodo testandi gratia, imprimi illud curavi.) This volume's map was the earlier one and Stukeley later employed it for his own Itinerarium Curiosum published posthumously in 1776.

The work was studied critically and various aspects of pseudo-Richard's text were universally rejected, including his claimed province of Vespasiana in lowland Scotland. Edward Gibbon considered pseudo-Richard to be "feeble evidence" and John Pinkerton tersely noted that, where the two differ, "Ptolemy must be right and Richard must be wrong." Nonetheless, the legitimacy of the text itself was unquestioned for decades despite no actual manuscript ever being seen by another person. Instead, Bertram always provided credible reasons why the actual document could not be made available and provided copies to satisfy each new request for information.

== Later life ==
Stukeley assisted Bertram in joining the Society of Antiquaries in 1756. Bertram was succeeded as the naval academy's English teacher by the Swedish Carl Mannercrantz. The terminology and accent system he employed in his works, despite claims to originality, seem to broadly mimic Jens Høysgaard's and Bertram passed unmentioned by the Danish Biographical Dictionary. His Royal English–Danish Grammar was undeserving of its appellation and was published, like all his books, at his own expense; nonetheless, it has been noted as "far and away the longest, the most ambitious, and the best" such work in its time. The end of its third volume consisted of blurbs and testimonials, including praise from the German Anglicist Theodor Arnold. Bertram died a respected scholar in Copenhagen on 8 January 1765.

== Legacy ==
The success of the forgery was partially due to the difficulty in finding Bertram's original text, which had a limited printing in Copenhagen. British scholars generally relied on Stukeley's translation, which obscured some of the questionable aspects of the text, until a new volume with the original text and a full translation was published anonymously by Henry Hatcher in 1809. By Hatcher's time, it had become impossible to purchase a copy in London or Copenhagen, and his own edition was produced through the loan of William Coxe's copy. Bertram's letters to Stukeley were acquired by John Britton and studied by Joseph Hunter.

The inability to find a manuscript in Copenhagen after Bertram's death provoked some questions as to its validity. In 1827, John Hodgson fully rejected the text as spurious on account of its absence from Bertram's papers in Copenhagen, errors in the "extract"'s palaeography, and the work's highly unusual Latin style. Enough doubts had arisen by 1838 that the English Historical Society declined to include The Description of Britain in its list of important historical works. In 1846, the German scholar Karl Wex conclusively proved at least some passages of the Description were completely spurious. He had been working on a new edition of Tacitus's Agricola and, consulting the Description, he recognized that it included transcription errors which had been introduced to editions of Tacitus by Venetian printers in the late 15th century. His work was translated into English by Beale Poste and printed by the Gentleman's Magazine in October 1846.

Many British scholars were slow to accept the truth. Some of the routes mentioned by the work had seemed to have been subsequently borne out and excuses were made for the known errors. Further evidence of the falsity of The Description of Britain came out in the following years, however, until no serious effort could be made in defence of the document. Bertram had on several occasions adopted variant readings and hypotheses unknown before William Camden. The final confirmation that the Description was spurious came in the 1860s. Over four articles in 1866 and 1867, Bernard Bolingbroke Woodward thoroughly debunked the work and, in 1869, J. E. B. Mayor complemented this by thoroughly comparing the Description with the Historial Mirror written by the real Richard of Cirencester (his only surviving work), which he had been reviewing and editing for the Rolls Series. Blame fell hardest on the reputation of William Stukeley, although it also impugned Edward Gibbon, William Roy, and other scholars who had accepted it.

== Bibliography ==
Charles Bertram was the author, editor, or translator of the following works:

- An Essay on the Excellency and Style of the English Tongue (1749)
- Rudiments of English Grammar (Latin: Rudimenta Grammatica Anglicanæ, Danish: Begyndelses Grunde til den Engliske Sprog-Kunst; 1750) (in Danish)
- Ethics, from Several Authors, the Words Accented to Render the English Pronuntiation Easy to Foreigners (1751) (in Danish and English)
- The Royal English–Danish Grammar (Danish: Grundig Anvisning til det Engliske Sprogs Kundskab; 3 vols.; 1753, reprinted 1765) (in Danish and English)
- Wohlunterrichterer Schilderer und Mahler (1755) (in German)
- Three Authors on the Ancient History of the British People (Latin: Britannicarum Gentium Historiæ Antiquæ Scriptores Tres; 1757) (in Latin)
- The History of the Britons (Latin: Eulogium Britanniae; 1758) (in Latin)
- On the Great Advantages of a Godly Life (Danish: Betragtning over et gudeligt Levnets store Fordele og allerstørste Vigtighed; 1760) (in Danish)
- A Statistical Account of the Danish Army (1761) (in German) (1762) (in Danish)
