= George Lynn (cricketer) =

English cricketer

Personal information
- Full name: George Henry Lynn
- Born: 31 August 1848; East Grinstead, Sussex, England
- Died: 21 September 1921 (aged 73); East Grinstead, Sussex, England
- Batting: Unknown
- Bowling: Unknown

Domestic team information
- Years: Team
- 1872–1873: Sussex

Career statistics
Competition	First-class
Matches	6
Runs scored	128
Batting average	9.84
100s/50s	–/–
Top score	25
Balls bowled	12
Wickets	1
Bowling average	8.00
5 wickets in innings	–
10 wickets in match	–
Best bowling	1/8
Catches/stumpings	2/–
- Source: Cricinfo, 13 March 2012

George Henry Lynn (31 March 1848 – 21 September 1921) was an English cricketer. Lynn's batting and bowling styles are unknown. He was born at East Grinstead, Sussex.

Lynn made his first-class debut for Sussex against Gloucestershire in 1872. He made seven further first-class appearances for the county, the last of which came against Kent in 1873. In his eight first-class matches for Sussex, he scored a total of 128 runs at an average of 9.84, with a high score of 25. With the ball, he took a single wicket, that of Surrey's Charles Chenery.

He died at the town of his birth on 21 September 1921.
