= George Lynn (astronomer) =

Astronomer and antiquary

George, The Elder Lynn
- Born: 1676
- Died: 1742

George Lynn, the Elder (born 1676 died 1742) was an English astronomer and antiquary, born at Southwick House, near Oundle, Northamptonshire

== Life ==
He was son of George Lynn (d. 1681, aged 34), lord of the manor of Southwick, by his wife, Mary, eldest daughter of Walter Johnston of Spalding. His youngest brother Walter Lynn was a medical writer and inventor. Lynn made observations of the eclipses of Jupiter's satellites at Southwick, 1724–6 and 1730–5, with a thirteen-foot telescope, and laid his results before the Royal Society, as well as an account of the aurora borealis of 8 October 1726. In 1727 he proposed to the society "A Method of Determining Longitude from Falling Stars", which was revived later by Benzenberg. Meteorological registers kept by him over fourteen years were communicated to the same Royal Society in 1740. His observation of twenty-one sunspots on 21 July 1736 obtained no public record. He became in 1719 a member of the Spalding Society, to which he presented an extensive table of logarithms compiled by himself, and he joined William Stukeley in founding The Brazen-Nose Society at Stamford, Lincolnshire in 1736. About the same time he discovered at Cotterstock, within a mile of his home, the tessellated pavement of a Roman villa, and his drawing of it was engraved by George Vertue for the Society of Antiquaries.

== Family ==
By his wife Elizabeth, daughter of Humfrey Bellamy of London, he had two daughters and a son, George, who shared his antiquarian tastes, and has sometimes been confused with him.

George Lynn the younger (1707–1758) was a barrister of the Inner Temple, and joined the Spalding Society in 1723 and the Society of Antiquaries in 1726. He married, in August 1734, a daughter of Sir Edward Bellamy, lord mayor of London in 1735. and through her became possessed of the manor of Frinton in Essex. He died on 16 May 1758, and was succeeded in the lordship of Southwick by a distant relative, who took the name of Lynn, and the estate, owned by the family since 1486, passed by marriage to Mr. George Capron in 1841. On his death, in 1758, a handsome monument by Roubiliac was erected to him in the parish church of Southwick. (Note: Memoirs of William Stukeley, MD (Surtees Society), 1882, i. 427, iii. 38, 49) (Note: Bridges's History of Northamptonshire (Whalley), ii. 469, 472) (Note: Nichols's Literary Anecdotes vi. 72, 116) (Note: Reliquiae Galleanæ, pages 57, 64) (Note: Wolf's Geschichte der Astronomie, page 699) (Note: Whellan's Hist. and Gazetteer of Northamptonshire, 1849, page 743) (Note: Watt's Bibl. British) (Note: The Genealogist, i. 353–4.)
