= Thomas Codrington =

British engineer and antiquarian

- Born: 1829; Wroughton, Wiltshire
- Died: 1918
- Occupation: Engineer
- Engineering career
- Discipline: Civil engineering
- Institutions: Institution of Civil Engineers

Thomas Codrington (1829 in Wroughton, Wiltshire – 1918) was a British engineer and antiquarian of the late Victorian era. With a career background as an Inspector for local government, he published several known works. First was Report on the Destruction of Town Refuse, published by Her Majesty's Stationery Office in 1888. This was only a short pamphlet of 48 pages, including illustrations of furnaces in use at the time.

Codrington went on to write the slightly more substantial 172 page work The Maintenance of Macadamised Roads in 1879, published by E. & F.N. Spon.

For the Roads Improvement Association, Codrington wrote The Roads Improvement Association - Its Teaching Confirmed; he had acted for the RIA in a successful court action in 1885 regarding the state of the roads in Halesowen.

However, by far Codrington's most famous work was also one of his last. Roman Roads in Britain, published originally in 1903, was the first attempt by any author to catalogue fully the evident remains of the Roman transport network in the United Kingdom. Several further editions were subsequently published, and indeed reprinted. The last of these was a reprint of the 3rd edition in 1928.
