= William of Woodford =

English Franciscan friar and theologian

William of Woodford or Wydford, OFM (fl. 1380–1411) was an English cleric and scholastic philosopher, known as an opponent of Wycliffe.

== Life ==
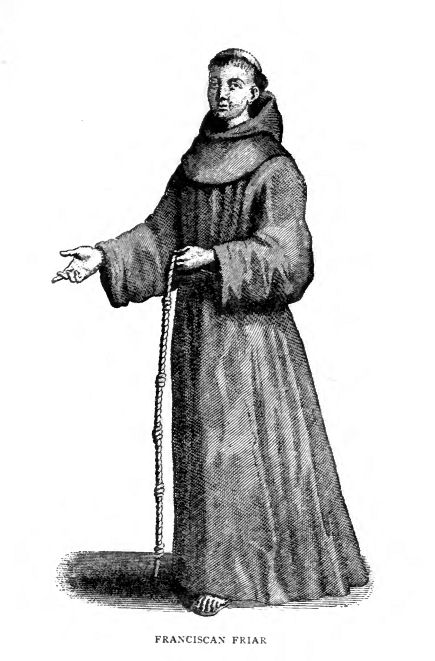
Illustration of a Franciscan friar in Gasquet's English Monastic Life (1904)

Although William of Woodford was erroneously identified by the Irish historian Wadding with William of Waterford (who appears to have flourished about 1433, and wrote a Tractatus de Religione, which he addressed to Cardinal Julian Cesarini (Note: cf. Ware, Writers of Ireland, pp. 87, 88.)), there seems to be no doubt that Woodford was an Englishman. He became a Franciscan and was educated at Oxford, where he graduated D.D.

Woodford taught in the schools and came into friendly contact with Wycliffe. "When I was lecturing concurrently with him on the Sentences", he says, "Wycliffe used to write his answers to the arguments, which I advanced to him, in a notebook which I sent him with my arguments, and to send me back the notebook". (Note: Little, Grey Friars, p. 81) With the development of Wycliffe's views, however, Woodford became increasingly hostile, and when, in his Confessio in 1381, the reformer repudiated transubstantiation, Woodford wrote his earliest extant work in reply. It was entitled Septuaginta Quæstiones de Sacramento Eucharistiæ, and is thought to have been composed as a course of lectures delivered in the Grey Friars' church, London, as a preparation for the Feast of Corpus Christi on 10 June 1381; (Note: Netter, Fasciculi Zizaniorum, Rolls Series p. 517.) five manuscripts at least of this work are extant. (Note: British Library Royal MS. 7 B. iii.; Harley MSS. 31, ff. 1–94 and 42; Exeter College, Oxford MS. 7; St. John's College, Oxford MS. 144) This was the first of a series of works in which Woodford attacked Wycliffe and his followers, and his writings occasionally throw light on Wycliffe's career, though his statements (e.g. that Wycliffe was expelled from Canterbury Hall) are not always to be accepted if lacking corroboration. (Note: cf. Lechler, Wycliffe, 1878, i. 166–8; Church Quarterly Review, v. 129 sqq.; Rashdall, Universities of Europe, ii. 498) He also replied to the attacks of Richard Fitzralph on the mendicant orders.

There is little doubt that Woodford is the William de Wydford whom Margaret, Countess of Norfolk, described in 1384 as her "well-beloved father in God", and for the term of whose life she granted the Minoresses of Aldgate Without a yearly rent of twenty marks from "le Brokenwharf", London. (Note: Calendar of Patent Rolls, 1381–5, p. 452) In 1389 he was regent-master in theology among the minorites at Oxford, and in 1390 was vicar of the provincial minister; in both years he lectured against Wycliffe, and Thomas Netter was one of his pupils. (Note: Fasciculi Zizaniorum, p. 525) Henceforth he seems to have resided principally at the Grey Friars, London, and in 1396 he obtained from Boniface IX sanction for the special privileges he enjoyed in this convent. Bale, Pits, and Wadding state that he died in 1397 and was buried at Colchester, but Sbaralea pointed out that in one of his works Henry was referred to as King; he also says that Woodford was deputed from Oxford to attend a council in London in 1411. Probably he died soon after; he was buried in the choir of Grey Friars church, London. (Note: Cotton MS. Vitellius, F. xii. f. 274 b)

== Works ==
Bale and subsequent bibliographers give a long list of works by Woodford, many of which are lost, and some of which can only be doubtfully attributed to Woodford; (Note: see Little, Grey Friars, pp. 248–9) but the numerous copies extant of the others indicate that Woodford's works were widely read, and he was considered "acerrimus hereticorum extirpator". The following is a list of his extant works:

1. Commentaries on Ezechiel, Ecclesiastes, St. Luke, and St. Paul's Epistle to the Romans (British Library Royal MS. 4, A. xiii.).
2. Determinationes Quatuor, i.e. lectures at Oxford, 1389–90 (Harley MSS. 31 and 42; Bodley MSS. 2224, 2766, 3340; Digby MS. 170, ff. 1–33).
3. De Causis Condempnacionis Articulorum 18 dampnatorum Johannis Wyclif, 1396 (British Library Royal MS. 8, F. xi.; Harley MSS. 31 and 42; Bodley MS. 2766; Merton College MSS. 198 and 318; Corpus Christi College MS. 183, ff. 23 sqq.; printed in Brown, Fasciculus Rerum Expetendarum et Fugiendarum, i. 190–265).
4. De Sacerdotio Novi Testamenti (British Library Royal MS. 7, B. iii.; Merton College MS. 198).
5. Defensorium Mendicitatis contra Armachanum, i.e. Richard Fitzralph, Archbishop of Armagh (Magdalen College, Oxford MS. 75; Cambridge University Library MS. Ff. i. 21).
6. De erroribus Armachani (Cambridge University Library Ff. i. 21; New College MS. 290, ff. 258 sqq.).
7. Responsiones contra Wiclevum et Lollardos (Bodley MS. 2766).
8. De Veneratione Imaginum (Harley MS. 31, ff. 182–205).

== Bibliography ==
- Doyle, Eric (1977). "William Woodford, O.F.M., and John Wyclif’s De Religione". Speculum 52(2): 329–336.
- Doyle, Eric (1983). "William Woodford, O.F.M. (c. 1330-c. 1400)". Franciscan Studies 43: 17–187.
- Pollard, Albert Frederick (1900). "Woodford, William of" . In Lee, Sidney (ed.). Dictionary of National Biography. Vol. 62. London: Smith, Elder & Co. pp. 396–397.
