= Theodor Arnold =

German Anglicist (1683–1771)

Theodor Arnold (1683–1771) was a German Anglicist from Leipzig, at the time a part of the Electorate of Saxony. He was a professor at the University of Leipzig and published numerous English grammars, dictionaries, and translations for German and Danish readers. His works were among the most popular for English-language learning in Germany in the 18th and 19th centuries.

== Bibliography ==
- New English Grammar (Hanover: 1718 & Leipzig: 1823 & 1829)
- Grammatica Anglicana Concentrata, oder Kurtz-gefaßte Englische Grammatica (Leipzig: 1736 & 1781) (in German)
- The Quran (from George Sale's English translation, 1746) (in German)
- A Compleat English Dictionary oder Vollständiges Englisch-Deutsche Wörter-Buch (Leipzig: 1752) (in German)
- A Complet Vocabulary, English and German (Leipzig: 1757 & 1790) (in German)
- Vollständiges Deutsch-Englishes Wörterbuch (Leipzig: 1778 & 1783) (in German)
- Grammatica Anglicana et Danica Concentrata eller Engelske og Danske Grammatika (Copenhagen: 1791) (in Danish)
- Engelske Grammatik (Copenhagen: 1800) (in Danish)
- Fuldstændig Engelsk og Dansk Haand-Ordbog (Copenhagen: 1820) (in Danish)
