= Henry Hatcher =

English antiquarian (1777 – 1846)

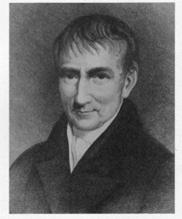
Henry Hatcher

Henry Hatcher (14 May 1777 – 14 December 1846) was an English antiquarian, born in Kemble, Gloucestershire. He is known for his scholarly contributions to books on the History of Wiltshire. The Hatcher Review of the Alderbury & Whaddon Local History Research Group is named in his memory.

== Life ==
In 1790 Henry and his family moved to Colchester. In school he excelled in classics and mathematics and at age fourteen he became a junior assistant at his school, over the next three years he filled similar situations in other establishments. In 1795 he became an amanuensis to the historian William Coxe whom he assisted in the compilation of his historical works, he also assisted Sir Richard Hoare in many of his works.

In May 1817 he married Anne, daughter of Richard Amor, in Durrington, Wiltshire. Anne later died on the 28 February 1846 and later that year Hatcher fell ill, seemingly recovered but then suddenly died on 14 December 1846 at age 69. A monument to his memory was placed by public subscription in Salisbury Cathedral.

Among the manuscripts which he left behind were an Anglo-Saxon glossary and grammar, a treatise on the art of fortification, and a dissertation on military and a physical geography. Hatcher's assistance, especially in the labour of translating Spanish and Portuguese documents, was acknowledged by Coxe in his ‘History of the Bourbon Kings of Spain’; a similar testimony to his aid was given in the ‘Memoirs of the Duke of Marlborough’, and when Coxe's posthumous volume on the Pelham administration appeared, the preface expressed his indebtedness to his ‘faithful and able secretary Mr. Hatcher.’
