= Richard of Cirencester =

Medieval monk and historian, victim of historical forgery

Richard of Cirencester (Latin: Ricardus de Cirencestria; before 1340–1400) was a cleric and minor historian of the Benedictine abbey at Westminster. He was highly famed in the 18th and 19th century as the author of The Description of Britain before it was proved to have been a later forgery in 1846.

== Life ==
His name (as Circestre) first appears on the chamberlain's list of the monks of that foundation drawn up in the year 1355. In 1391, he obtained a licence from the abbot to go to Rome and in this the abbot gave his testimony to Richard's perfect and sincere observance of religion for upwards of thirty years. In 1400 Richard spent nine nights of the infirmary of the abbey, and likely died that January.

His only known extant work are the four books of the Historial Mirror of the Deeds of the Kings of England (Latin: Speculum historiale de gestis regum Angliae), covering the years from 447 to 1066. The manuscript of this is in the university library at Cambridge and was edited in two volumes for the Rolls Series by John Mayor. At the conclusion of the fourth book Richard expresses his intention of continuing his narrative from the accession of William I, and incorporating a sketch of the Conqueror's career from his birth. This design he does not, however, appear to have carried into effect.

The value of the Historial Mirror as a contribution to our historical knowledge is but slight, for it is mainly a compilation from other writers and even in transcribing these the compiler is guilty of great carelessness. He gives, however, numerous charters relating to Westminster Abbey and also a very complete account of the saints whose tombs were in the abbey church, especially concerning Edward the Confessor. The work was, however, largely used by historians and antiquaries until, with the rise of a more critical spirit, its value became more accurately estimated. Besides the Historial Mirror Richard also wrote, according to a 1396 letter from William of Woodford to Archbishop Thomas of Canterbury, a treatise on the offices (De officiis) and there was formerly in the cathedral library at Peterborough another tract ascribed to him entitled Super Symbolum. Of neither of these works, however, does any known copy now exist.

== Richard of Westminster ==
Richard is best known for the historical forgery perpetrated by Charles Bertram known as The Description of Britain (Latin: De situ Britanniae). Bertram's original manuscript ascribed this to "Richard the Westminsterian monk" (Ricardus monachus Westmonasteriensis), but a British academic looking to verify its authenticity discovered that Richard of Cirencester had been at Westminster around the time of the work's supposed composition. It was then published under a variant of his name (Ricardus Corinensis) and the conflation was universally accepted, to the point where Richard's name is more associated with the discredited forgery than with his own works.

== Bibliography ==
- Speculum Historiale de Gestis regum Angliæ
- Tractatus super Symbolum Majus at Minus
- Liber de Officiis Ecclesiasticis
