= Sandlin =

Sandlin is a surname, which may refer to:

== People ==
- Andrew Sandlin, American Christian minister, cultural theologian, and author
- Bryan Sandlin, American politician in the state of Washington
- David Sandlin (artist) (born 1956), Northern Irish-born American artist
- David Sandlin (baseball) (born 2001), American baseball player
- Destin Sandlin (born 1981), American engineer and science communicator
- Edward L. Sandlin (1922–1992), American sound editor
- Jack Sandlin, American politician
- John N. Sandlin (1872–1957), American politician
- Johnny Sandlin (1945–2017), American recording engineer and record producer
- Lee Sandlin (1956–2014), American journalist and essayist
- Lena Sandlin-Hedman (born 1969), Swedish politician
- Max Sandlin (born 1952), American politician
- Nick Sandlin (born 1997), American professional baseball pitcher
- Rosemary Sandlin (born 1946), American politician
- Ronald Sandlin (born c. 1986), American internet marketer
- Stephanie Herseth Sandlin (born 1970), American attorney, university administrator, and politician
- Tim Sandlin (born 1950), American novelist and screenwriter
- Tommy Sandlin (1944–2006), Swedish ice hockey coach
- Willie Sandlin (1890–1949), American World War I soldier

== Other uses ==
- Sandlin Bug, a type of ultralight glider
- Sandlin Goat, a type of ultralight glider

== See also ==
- Sandling (disambiguation)
