= Pilgrims' Way =

Historic walking route in England

Coordinates: 51°17′N 0°4′E

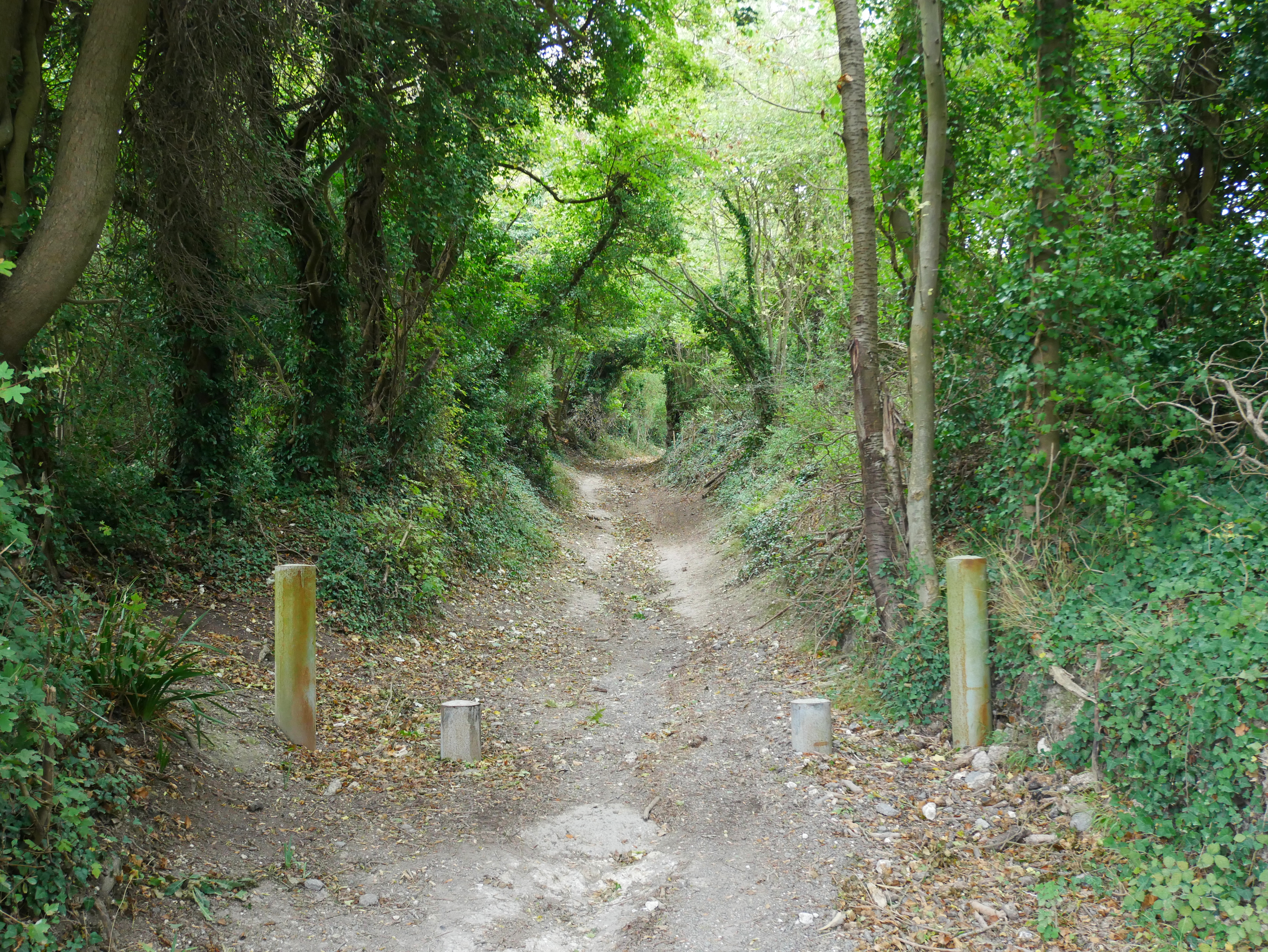
- The Pilgrims' Way as it passes the White Horse Stone, Kent
- Length: 192 km (119 mi)
- Location: South Eastern England, United Kingdom
- Trailheads: Winchester, Hampshire; Shrine of Thomas Becket, Canterbury, Kent
- Use: Hiking, cycling and byway; former pilgrim way
- Season: All year

The Pilgrims' Way (also Pilgrim's Way or Pilgrims Way) (Note: All three usages are noted on Ordnance Survey maps) is the historical route supposedly taken by pilgrims from Winchester in Hampshire, England, to the shrine of Thomas Becket at Canterbury in Kent. This name, of comparatively recent coinage, is applied to a pre-existing ancient trackway dated by archaeological finds to 600–450 BC, but probably in existence since the Stone Age. The prehistoric route followed the "natural causeway" east to west on the southern slopes of the North Downs.

The course was dictated by the natural geography: it took advantage of the contours, avoided the sticky clay of the land below but also the thinner, overlying "clay with flints" of the summits. In places a coexisting ridgeway and terrace way can be identified; the route followed would have varied with the season, but it would not drop below the upper line of cultivation. The trackway ran the entire length of the North Downs, leading to and from Folkestone: the pilgrims would have had to turn away from it, north along the valley of the Great Stour near Chilham, to reach Canterbury.

== History ==
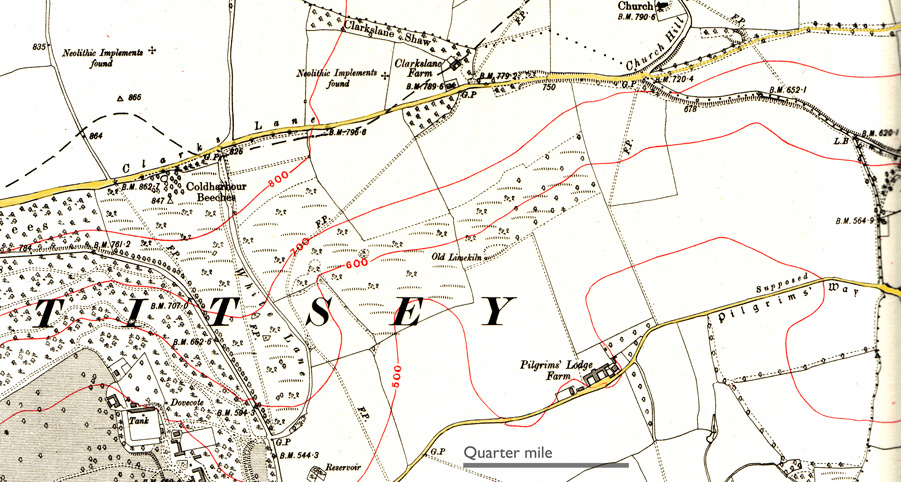
Map of Pilgrims Way near Titsey, Surrey. The upper route, on the brow of the North Downs, is the ancient trackway (note the archaeological finds at the top left); the lower, almost in the valley, is the route surmised by the Ordnance Survey in the 19th century

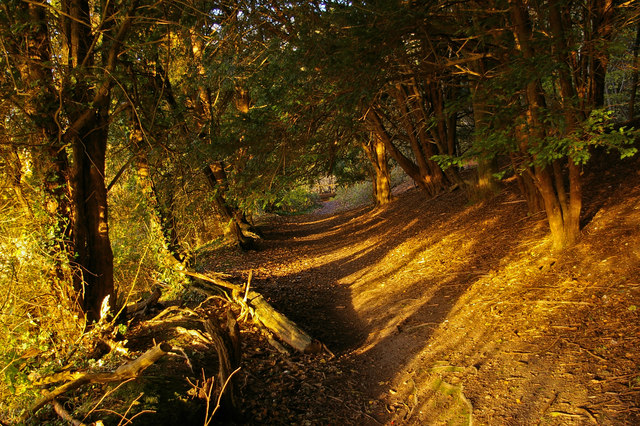
A section of the lower route, eroded into the slope, in Surrey

The prehistoric trackway extended further than the present Way, providing a link from the narrowest part of the English Channel to the important religious complexes of Avebury and Stonehenge, in Wiltshire, where it is known as the Harroway. The way then existed as "broad and ill-defined corridors of movement up to half a mile wide" and not as a single, well-defined track. The route was still followed as an artery for through traffic in Roman times, a period of continuous use of more than 3000 years.

From Thomas Becket's canonization in 1173, until the dissolution of the monasteries in 1538, his shrine at Canterbury became the most important in the country, indeed "after Rome...the chief shrine in Christendom", and it drew pilgrims from far and wide. Winchester, apart from being an ecclesiastical centre in its own right (the shrine of St Swithin), was an important regional focus and an aggregation point for travellers arriving through the seaports on the south coast. It is "widely accepted" that this was the route taken by Henry II on his pilgrimage of atonement for the death of Bishop Thomas, from France to Canterbury in July 1174, although this has been disputed and some evidence points to his having taken a route via London. Travellers from Winchester to Canterbury naturally used the ancient way, as it was the direct route, and research by local historians has provided much by way of detail—sometimes embellished—of the pilgrims' journeys. The numbers making their way to Canterbury by this route were not recorded, but the estimate by the Kentish historian William Coles Finch that it carried more than 100,000 pilgrims a year is surely an exaggeration; a more prosaic estimate—extrapolated from the records of pilgrims' offerings at the shrine—contends an annual figure closer to 1,000. A separate (and more reliably attested) route to Canterbury from London was by way of Watling Street, as followed by the storytellers in The Canterbury Tales by Geoffrey Chaucer.

Conversely, the concept of a single route called the Pilgrims' Way could be no older than the Victorian Ordnance Survey map of Surrey, whose surveyor, Edward Renouard James, published a pamphlet in 1871 entitled Notes on the Pilgrims' Way in West Surrey. While acknowledging that the route was "little studied" and that "very many persons in the neighbourhood had not been aware of it", he nonetheless caused the name to be inserted on the Ordnance Survey map, giving official sanction to his conjecture. Romantic writers such as Hilaire Belloc were eager to follow this up and they succeeded in creating "a fable of...modern origin" to explain the existence of the Way. In fact, the route as shown on modern maps is not only unsuitable for the mass movement of travellers but has also left few traces of their activity. The official history of the Ordnance Survey acknowledges the "enduring archaeological blunder", blaming the enthusiasm for history of the then Director, General Sir Henry James. However, F. C. Elliston-Erwood, a Kentish historian, notes that tithe records dating from before 1815 use the well established name "Pilgrims' Way" to reference and locate pieces of land. Earlier still, surviving thirteenth century documents show a "Pilgrim Road" by the walls of Thornham Castle, Kent, on what is today considered the route.

The Pilgrims' Way is at the centre of the Powell and Pressburger film A Canterbury Tale, with the camera panning along a map of the route at the start of the film.

== Route ==
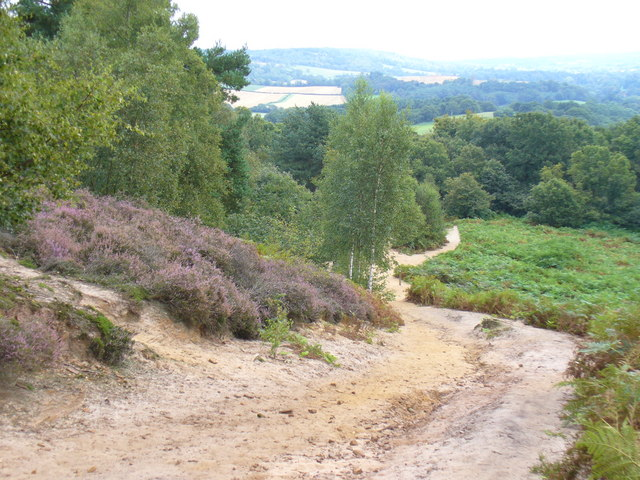
In the Middle Ages the pilgrims' route left the ancient trackway to climb St Martha's Hill

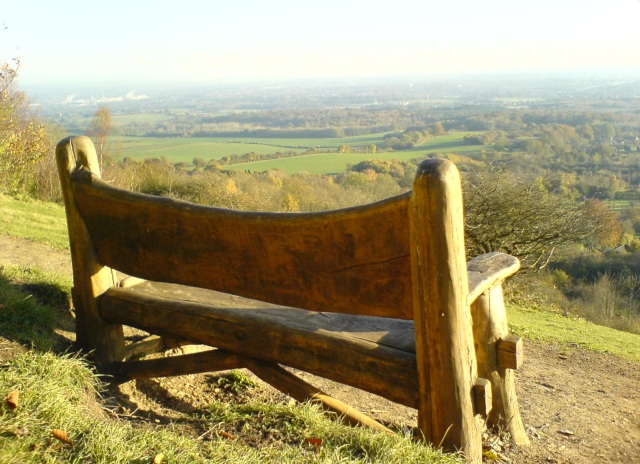
On the Pilgrims' Way near Trottiscliffe, Kent

Anyone walking the 'Pilgrims Way' from Winchester would have started along the Roman road east following the route through New Alresford, Four Marks, Alton and Bentley to Farnham. This roughly follows the modern A31.

The ancient main streets of towns along the route from Farnham (where the old trackway converges with the pilgrims' route) through Guildford, Dorking and Reigate align west to east, strongly suggesting that this was the most important route that passed through them. On modern Ordnance Survey maps, part of the route is shown running east from Farnham via the heights by Guildford Castle, then north of the village of Shere, north of Dorking, Reigate, Merstham, Chaldon, Godstone, Limpsfield and Westerham, through Otford, Kemsing and Wrotham, north of Trottiscliffe, towards Cuxton (where it crossed the River Medway). South of Rochester, the Pilgrims' Way travels through the villages of Burham, Boxley, Detling and continuing in a south-east direction to the north of the villages of Harrietsham and Lenham. The route continues south-east along the top of the Downs past Charing, to Wye and then turns north to follow the valley of the Great Stour through Chilham and on to Canterbury.

Along some stretches the pilgrims' route left the ancient trackway to encompass religious sites, examples being Pewley Down, near Guildford, where the later way passed St Martha's Hill and St Catherine's chantry chapel, some 500 metres to the south. At Reigate the thirteenth-century chapel of St Thomas and a hospice were built for the pilgrims' use, although they were not on the route. Boxley Abbey, with its revered Rood of Grace, was another recognised detour.

== National Trail ==
The North Downs Way National Trail parallels the old Pilgrims' Way between Farnham and Canterbury. Much of the traditional route of the Pilgrims' Way is now part of the modern road network and the Ramblers have previously advised walkers wishing to follow it to use St. Swithun's Way between Winchester and Farnham and the North Downs Way between Farnham and Canterbury as an alternative.

The route also links with the South Downs Way at Winchester.
