= Sandling =

Sandling may refer to:

== People ==
- Richard Sandling, British comedian

== Places ==
- Sandling, a mountain in Altaussee, Austria
- Sandling, Folkestone, a hamlet in Saltwood, Folkestone and Hythe District, Kent, England
  - Sandling railway station, located here
- Sandling, Maidstone, a hamlet near Maidstone, Kent, England

== Other uses ==
- Sandling (Dungeons & Dragons)

== See also ==
- Sandlin (disambiguation)
- Sandlings, a nature reserve in Suffolk, England
