= Sandling, Maidstone =

Hamlet in Kent, England

Coordinates: 51°17′51″N 0°30′23″E

Sandling
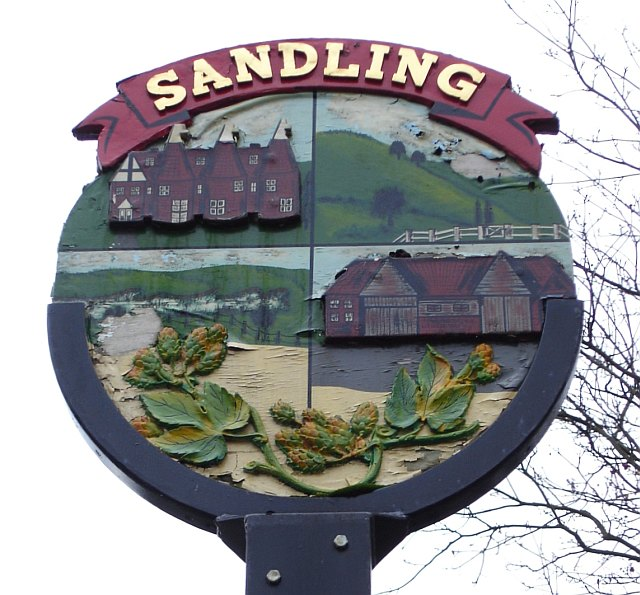
- Sandling sign

- Location within Kent
- Civil parish: Boxley
- District: Maidstone
- Shire county: Kent
- Region: South East
- Country: England
- Sovereign state: United Kingdom

Sandling is a hamlet to the north of the town of Maidstone, Kent, England, at the foot of the North Downs. It falls within the parish of Boxley.

Notable buildings in the hamlet include the remains of the twelfth century Boxley Abbey, the Hospitium or Boxley Abbey Barn, the fifteenth century gatehouse chapel of St Andrew's, the headquarters of the Kent Wildlife Trust at Tyland Barn, and Kent Life open-air museum.

Sandling's sign was erected to mark Boxley Parish Council’s centenary (1895-1995) and is based on ideas submitted by Sandling County Primary School pupils in 1993. It depicts Boarley Oast, the North Downs, the River Medway and Tyland Barn.

Several Stone Age sites border the hamlet, including Kit's Coty House, Little Kit's Coty House, Smythe's Megalith, the Coffin Stone and the White Horse Stone.

The fields in and around Sandling are primarily used for viticulture. Chapel Down tend 156 acres of vines at Boarley Farm.

== Boxley Abbey ==
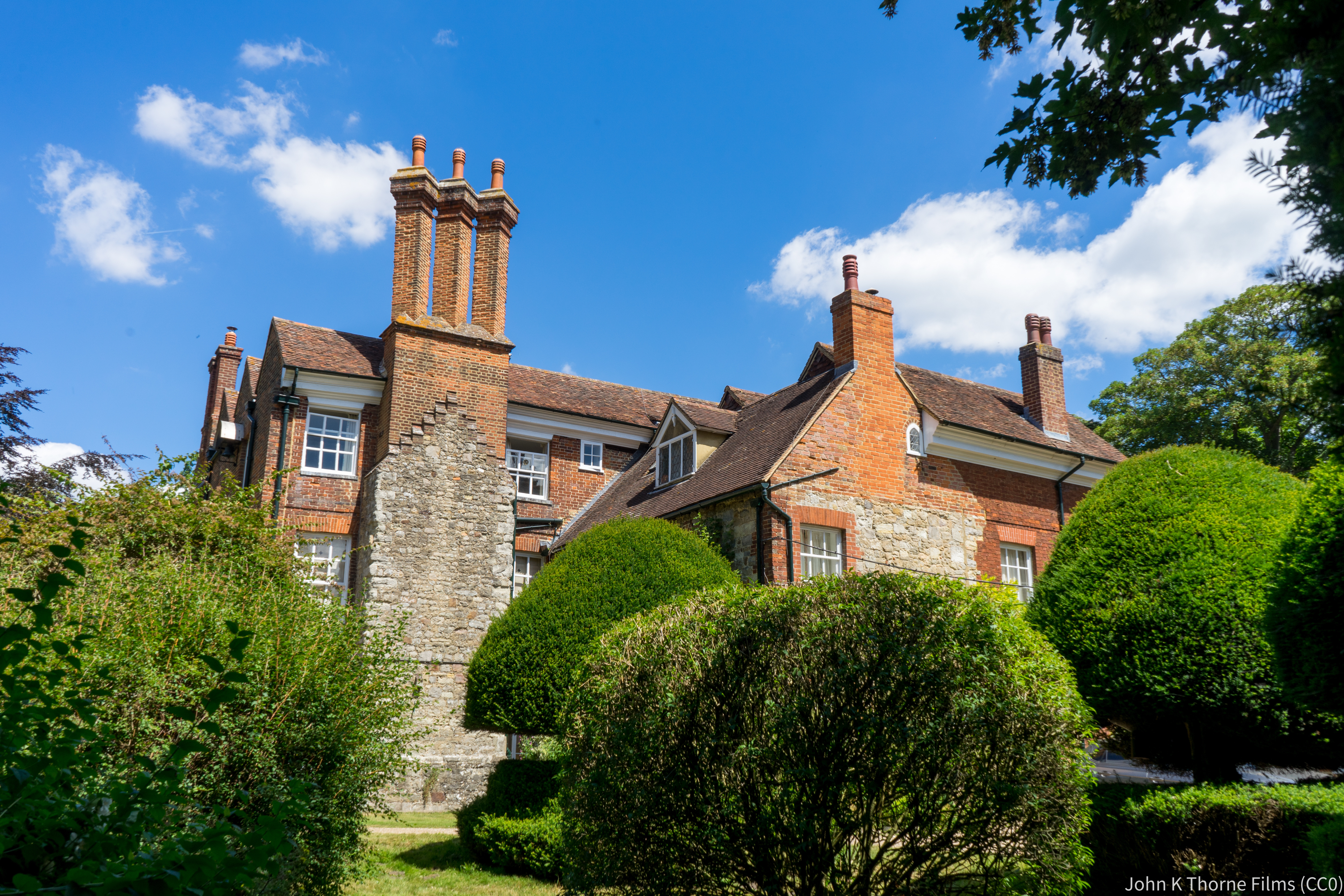
Boxley Abbey House

Boxley Abbey in Sandling was a Cistercian monastery founded circa 1146 CE by William of Ypres.

It was well-known for a relic called the Rood of Grace, a wooden cross with a Jesus figure that was said to move and speak. In 1538, during the Dissolution of the Monasteries, a commissioner sent by Thomas Cromwell examined the Rood of Grace and declared it fake, pointing out the levers and wires that enacted the movement.

The rood was taken down and displayed in Maidstone market so as to demonstrate the purported fraud. It was later sent to London where it was hacked to pieces in front of St Paul's Cathedral and burnt.

Theatrical historian Leanne Groeneveld contends, however, that "puppetry" of this kind was sometimes presented as a theatrical show to a fully cognisant audience. Thomas Cromwell biographer Diarmaid MacCulloch notes that moveable parts, "for devotional and not fraudulent purposes", were a feature of religious statuary at the time.

Following dissolution, sections of Boxley Abbey were transformed into a house with the remainder virtually demolished. Parts survive within the present Boxley Abbey House.

== The Hospitium or Boxley Abbey Barn ==
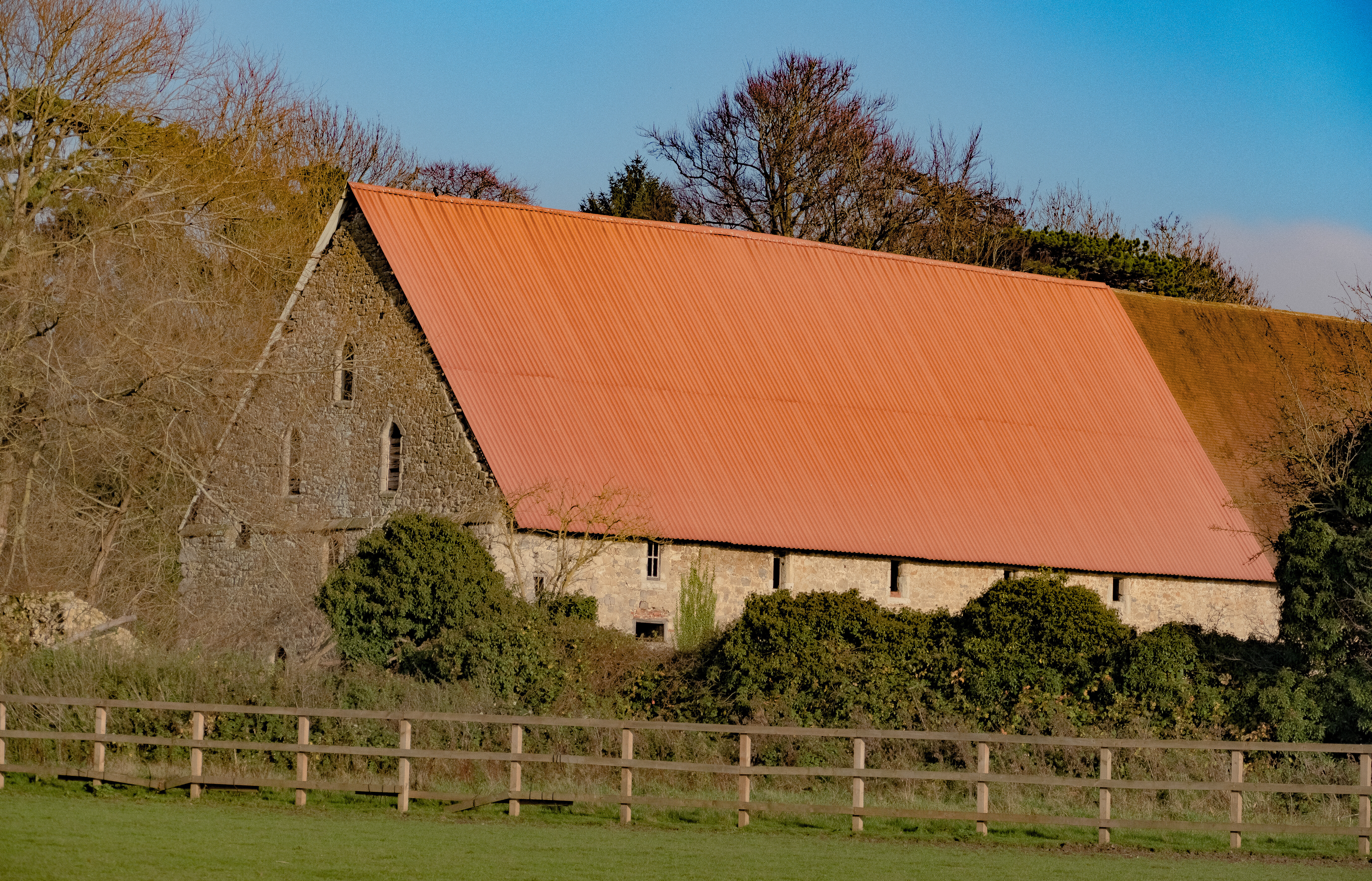
Boxley Abbey Barn

The term hospitium was used across Europe in the Middle Ages to refer to a building or complex of buildings attached to a monastery, where pilgrims and other lesser guests could find hospitality, including dormitory-based accommodation.

Boxley Abbey's Grade I listed Hospitium is 186 feet (57 m) long and was built in the late 13th or early 14th century. It is constructed of Kentish ragstone with two storeys and a plain tiled gable roof and was later used as a tithe barn.

The building is on the Historic England Heritage at Risk Register and is included as part of the Scheduled monument that covers Boxley Abbey.

== St Andrew's Chapel ==
The gatehouse chapel of St Andrew's in Sandling is a Grade II* listed building that dates back to 1484.

It sits 275m south-west of Boxley Abbey's inner gatehouse and most likely served people living or staying outside the boundary, and those not permitted within, such as women and the poor.

It may have been used by people on pilgrimage. Boxley Abbey is on the route of the Pilgrims Way to Canterbury, one of the most important pilgrimage sites in England at the time.

Boxley Abbey and St Andrew's would have been destinations in their own right, however. St Andrew's may have housed the supposed finger of Andrew the Apostle, inlaid heavily with silver, that was displayed at Boxley Abbey. The building still has squints to the north and south that would have allowed glimpses of the relic from outside.

St Andrew's Chapel was purchased by the Society for the Protection of Ancient Buildings (SPAB) in 2018.

== Tyland Barn ==
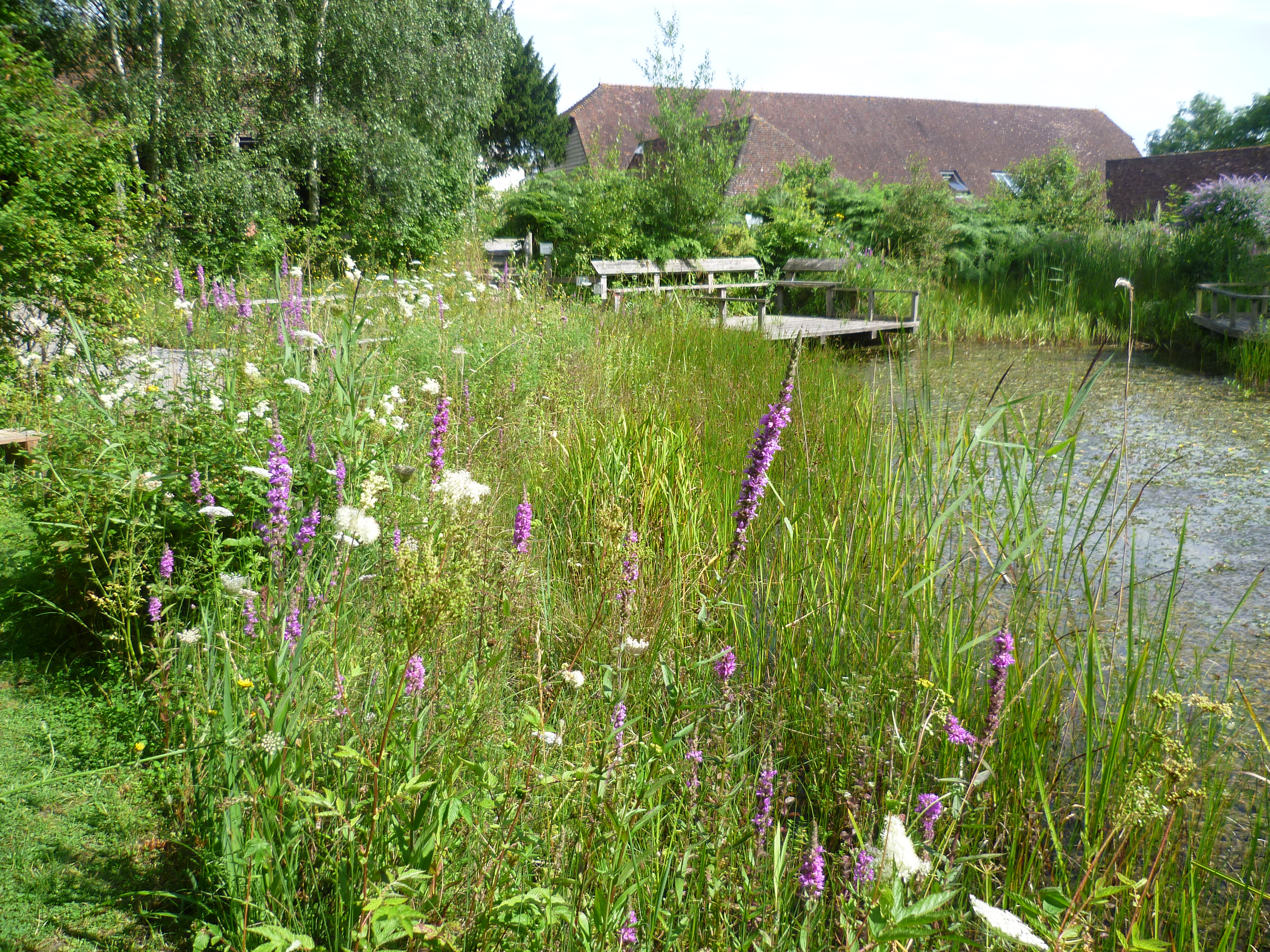
Tyland Barn nature reserve

Tyland Barn is a nature reserve that showcases the various habitats across the county of Kent, including a pond, grassland, chalk bank, shingle beach, scrub and hedges.

The barn is the headquarters of Kent Wildlife Trust, its Wildlife Centre, and the Kent & Medway Biological Records Centre. The Pond Café opened in 2023.

== Kent Life ==
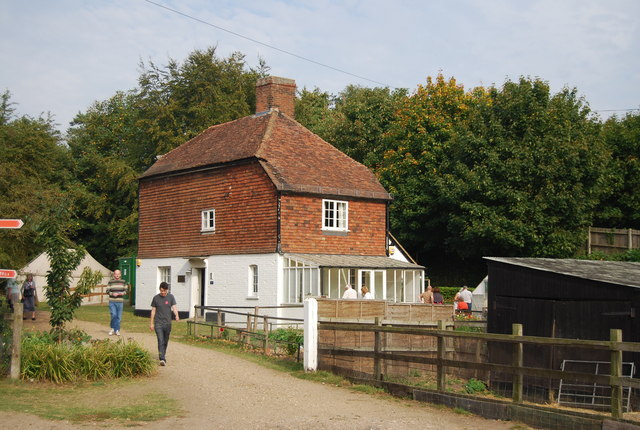
Kent Life open-air museum

Kent Life is an open-air rural life museum on the east bank of the River Medway, which recreates local farming traditions.

It opened in 1985 on the site of Sandling Farm, which was part of the Cobtree Manor Estate bequeathed to the people of Maidstone by Sir Garrard Tyrwhitt-Drake in 1964.

Kent Life is one of the last places in England where hops are grown, harvested, dried and packed in a traditional oast house.

== Medway Megaliths ==
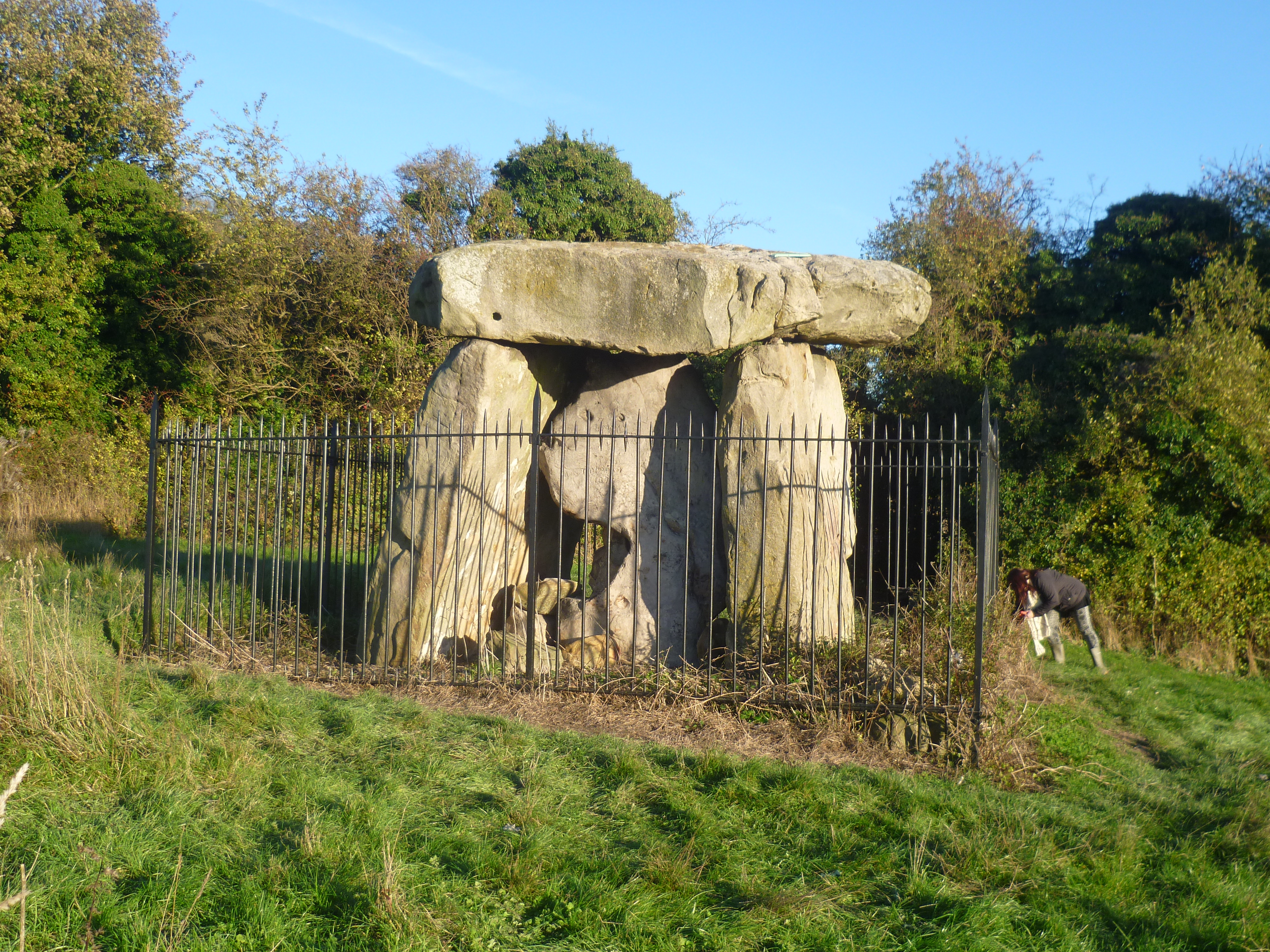
Kit's Coty House

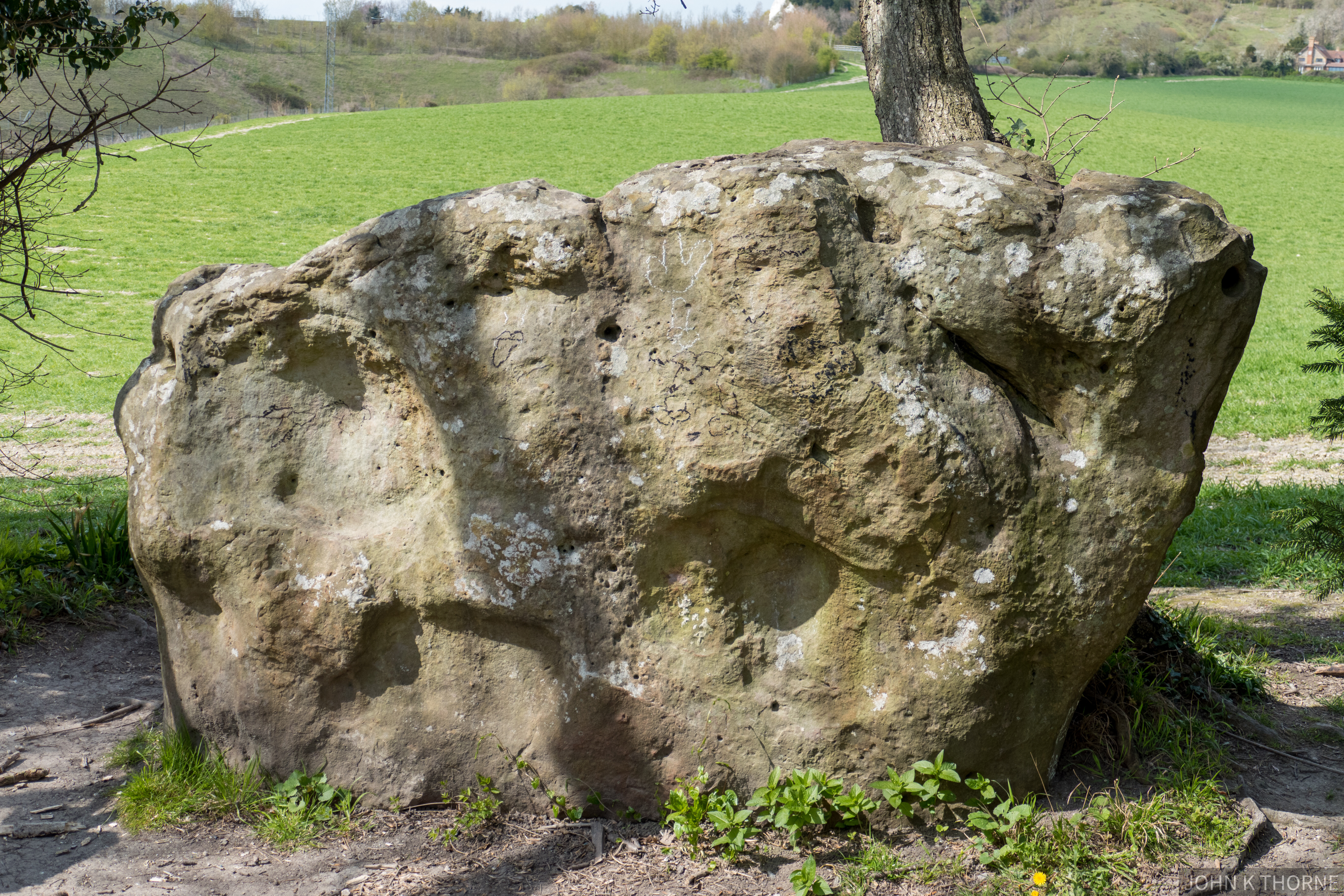
White Horse Stone

The Medway Megaliths, sometimes called the Kentish Megaliths, are a group of Early Neolithic chambered long barrows and other monuments created between the 4th and 3rd millennia BCE.

Some were used as tombs and may also have been the settings for religious rituals. They reflect the hunter-gatherers' evolution into pastoralists.

Kit's Coty House and Little Kit's Coty lie close to Kit's Coty village on Blue Bell Hill. The Coffin Stone is at Great Tottington farm, near Aylesford.

The site of Smythe's Megalith and the White Horse Stone, one of which remains, sit on Sandling's northern border, east of Blue Bell Hill.

== Walks ==
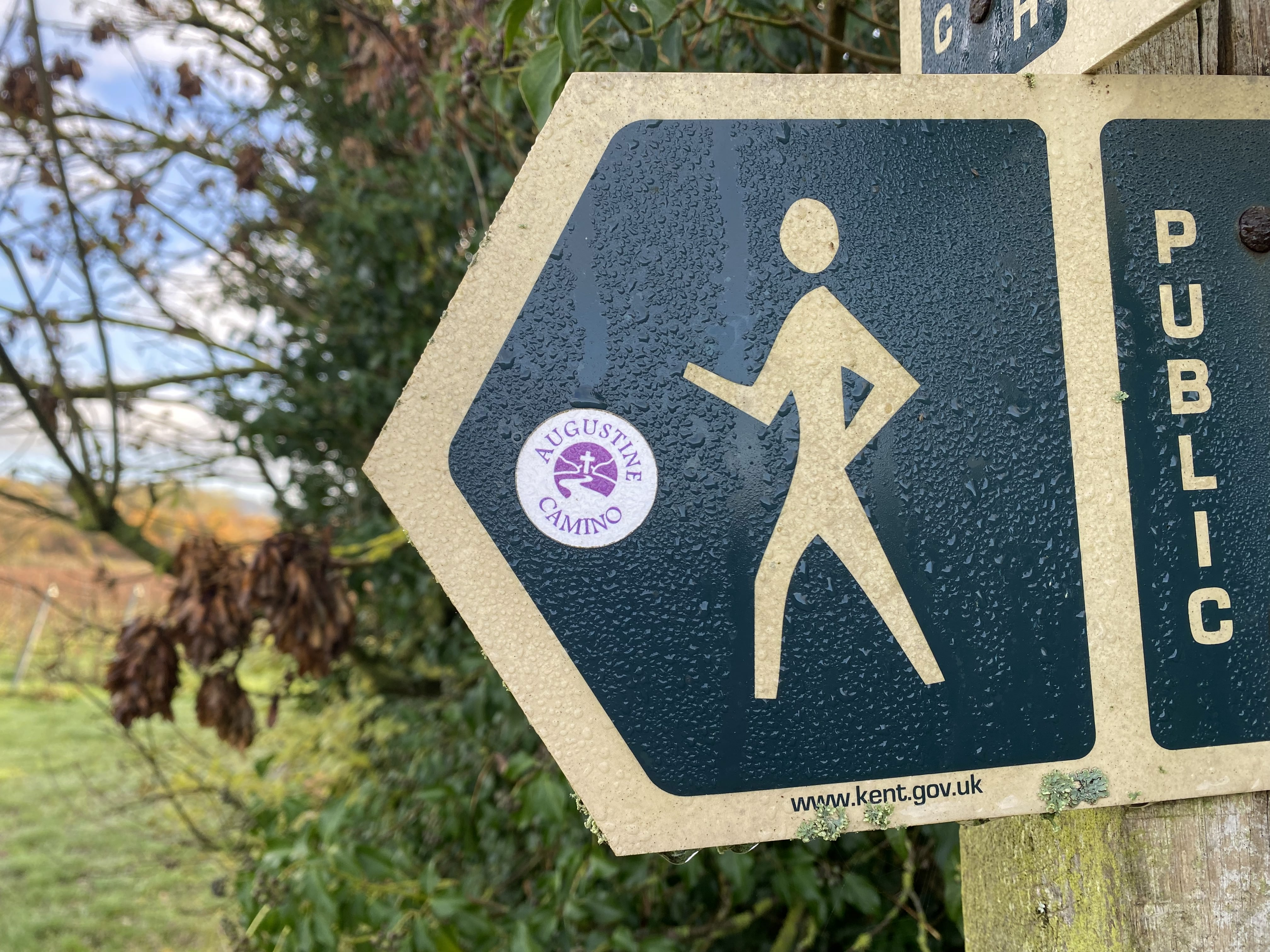
Augustine Camino

Sandling forms part of the Augustine Camino and is close to the North Downs Way.

=== Augustine Camino ===
The Augustine Camino is a week-long pilgrimage from Rochester Cathedral to St Augustine's Church in Ramsgate. Pilgrims walk east along Tyland Lane, heading north at Boxley Abbey before continuing east towards Boxley village.

=== North Downs Way ===
The North Downs Way is a 153 mi/246 km path that runs from Farnham, Surrey, to Dover, Kent. It passes north of Sandling along the Kent Downs Area of Outstanding Natural Beauty.

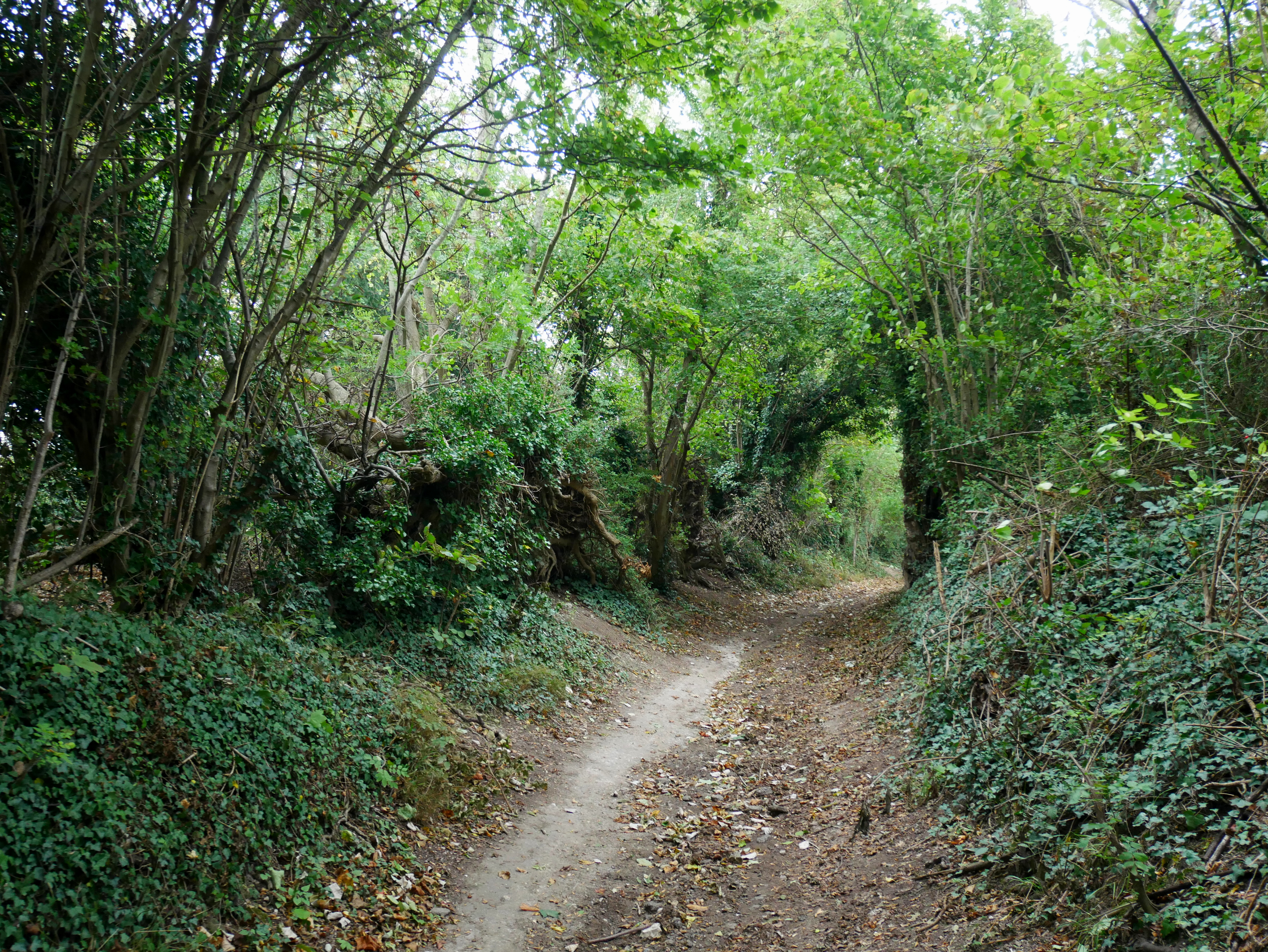
Pilgrims' Way near Sandling

=== Pilgrims' Way ===
The Pilgrims' Way is the path supposedly followed by pilgrims from Winchester, Hampshire to the shrine of Thomas Becket at Canterbury. It runs east to west along a pre-existing ancient trackway that is also part of the North Downs Way.

Both the North Downs Way and the Pilgrims' Way pass the site of Smythe's Megalith and the surviving White Horse Stone, just north of Sandling.

== Activities ==
=== Pumpkin Moon ===
Pumpkin Moon, in Old Chatham Road, produces more than 100 varieties of pumpkins and gourds for families to pick-their-own each Halloween and grows a maize maze in summer.

=== Lower Grange Farm ===
Lower Grange Farm, in Grange Lane, offers activities including climbing, mountain-biking, pioneering, archery, fencing, quad biking, hiking and bushcraft to groups including scouts and schools.

== Habitats ==
Sandling is one of several places in Maidstone to have had white squirrel sightings.

Cuckoo Woods, which lies between the hamlet and neighbouring Penenden Heath, is a sweet chestnut coppice recognised as ancient woodland.
