= Listed buildings in Boxley =

Civil Parish in Kent, England

Boxley is a village and civil parish in the Borough of Maidstone of Kent, England It contains two grade I, four grade II* and 66 grade II listed buildings that are recorded in the National Heritage List for England.

This list is based on the information retrieved online from Historic England.

== Key ==
Grade	Criteria
I	Buildings that are of exceptional interest
II*	Particularly important buildings of more than special interest
II	Buildings that are of special interest

== Listing ==
Name	Grade	Location	Type	Completed (Note: The date given is the date used by Historic England as significant for the initial building or that of an important part in the structure's description.)	Date designated	Grid ref. (Note: The grid reference is based on the British national grid reference system, sometimes known as OSGB36, used by the Ordnance Survey.) Geo-coordinates	Notes	Entry number (Note: The "List Entry Number" is a unique number assigned to each listed building and scheduled monument by Historic England.)	Image	Wikidata
Abbeygate Cottages	II	1-6			26 April 1968	TQ7597958789; 51°18′04″N 0°31′23″E		1336236	Upload Photo	Q26620749
Boxley Grange Farm House	II				20 July 1984	TQ7856660091; 51°18′43″N 0°33′39″E		1336237	Upload Photo	Q26620750
Engine House	II				20 July 1984	TQ7773458831; 51°18′03″N 0°32′53″E		1086230	Upload Photo	Q26376296
Lych Gate to Church of St Mary and All Saints, and Gates Attached	II	The Street			20 July 1984	TQ7744858958; 51°18′08″N 0°32′39″E		1185729	Upload Photo	Q87576253
Watercress Cottage in Garden of Parsonage Farm, and Wall Adjoining	II	The Street			20 July 1984	TQ7740158935; 51°18′07″N 0°32′36″E		1086244	Upload Photo	Q26376371
Railway Bridge No 618	II	Ashford Road			23 January 1987	TQ7726755577; 51°16′18″N 0°32′23″E		1261449	Upload Photo	Q26552397
Newnham Court Farm	II	Bearsted Road			20 July 1984	TQ7809456995; 51°17′03″N 0°33′09″E		1086231	Upload Photo	Q26376300
Abbey Farmhouse	II	Boarley Lane, Sandling			26 April 1968	TQ7586658806; 51°18′04″N 0°31′17″E		1086234	Upload Photo	Q26376316
Boarley Cottage	II	Boarley Lane, Boarley			26 April 1968	TQ7621759400; 51°18′23″N 0°31′36″E		1086232	Upload Photo	Q26376306
Boarley Farm House	II	Boarley Lane, Boarley			26 April 1968	TQ7621659461; 51°18′25″N 0°31′36″E		1086233	Upload Photo	Q26376311
St Andrew's Chapel	II*	Boarley Lane, Boxley Abbey, Sandling			20 October 1952	TQ7573658645; 51°17′59″N 0°31′10″E		1185580	Upload Photo	Q17545206
The Old Mill	II	Boarley Lane, Sandling			20 July 1984	TQ7549558247; 51°17′47″N 0°30′57″E		1185594	Upload Photo	Q26480910
The Old Mill House	II	Boarley Lane, Sandling			20 July 1984	TQ7548858237; 51°17′46″N 0°30′56″E		1086235	Upload Photo	Q26376320
Barn at Boxley Abbey	I	Boxley Abbey			20 October 1952	TQ7602358641; 51°17′59″N 0°31′25″E		1086229	Barn at Boxley Abbey More images	Q4951983
Boxley Abbey House	II*	Boxley Abbey			20 October 1952	TQ7610358681; 51°18′00″N 0°31′29″E		1086228	Boxley Abbey House More images	Q17545110
1, Boxley Cottages	II	Ashford Road, ME14 4AA			30 July 1951	TQ7808155472; 51°16′14″N 0°33′05″E		1336194	Upload Photo	Q26684994
2, Boxley Cottages	II	Ashford Road, ME14 4AA			2 August 1974	TQ7809455476; 51°16′14″N 0°33′06″E		1086388	Upload Photo	Q26377029
Barn Cottage	II	Boxley Road, Harbourland			20 July 1984	TQ7716357948; 51°17′35″N 0°32′22″E		1185597	Upload Photo	Q26480914
Old Harbourland	II	Boxley Road, Harbourland			20 July 1984	TQ7714957935; 51°17′35″N 0°32′22″E		1086236	Upload Photo	Q26376326
Barn 1 Yard South West of Tyland Farmhouse	II	Chatham Road			20 July 1984	TQ7530859284; 51°18′20″N 0°30′49″E		1185717	Upload Photo	Q26481022
Tyland Farmhouse	II	Chatham Road			20 July 1984	TQ7532759298; 51°18′21″N 0°30′50″E		1086237	Upload Photo	Q26376332
Head Stone to Elizabeth, Daughter of Mr John Wise Adjacent to Head Stone to Mr John Wise at Church of St Mary and All Saints	II	The Street			20 July 1984	TQ7747658953; 51°18′07″N 0°32′40″E		1086209	Upload Photo	Q87576258
Grove Green Cottage	II	Grove Green			20 July 1984	TQ7821056217; 51°16′38″N 0°33′13″E		1185718	Upload Photo	Q26481023
Oast Approximately 20 Yards South East of the Cottage	II	Grove Green			20 July 1984	TQ7822556140; 51°16′36″N 0°33′14″E		1086239	Upload Photo	Q26376343
The Cottage	II	Grove Green			20 July 1984	TQ7819156174; 51°16′37″N 0°33′12″E		1086238	Upload Photo	Q26376338
Well House	II	Grove Green			20 July 1984	TQ7826656235; 51°16′39″N 0°33′16″E		1185721	Upload Photo	Q26481025
Harbourland Farmhouse	II	Harbour Land			2 August 1974	TQ7702057789; 51°17′30″N 0°32′15″E		1086346	Upload Photo	Q26376823
Barn Approximately 7 Yards North East of Harp Farmhouse	II	Harp Farm Road			20 July 1984	TQ7744459935; 51°18′39″N 0°32′40″E		1299555	Upload Photo	Q26586948
Harp Farmhouse	II	Harp Farm Road			20 July 1984	TQ7741759926; 51°18′39″N 0°32′39″E		1336238	Upload Photo	Q26620751
Well House, Circa 5 Yards North of Harp Farmhouse	II	Harp Farm Road			20 July 1984	TQ7741859943; 51°18′39″N 0°32′39″E		1086240	Upload Photo	Q26376349
Lock Cottage	II	3, Lock Lane, Sandling			20 July 1984	TQ7486658173; 51°17′45″N 0°30′24″E		1336239	Upload Photo	Q26620752
Ha Ha in Grounds of Vinters Circa 100 Yards North. North West of Grove Lodge	II	New Cut Road, Vinters			20 July 1984	TQ7762656092; 51°16′35″N 0°32′43″E		1336240	Upload Photo	Q26620753
Ha Ha in Grounds of Vinters Circa 120 Yards North of Grove Lodge	II	New Cut Road, Vinters			20 July 1984	TQ7770256085; 51°16′34″N 0°32′47″E		1299556	Upload Photo	Q26586949
Ha Ha in Grounds of Vinters Circa 2 1/2 Yards West of Stretch Circa 100 Yards North North West of Grove Lodge	II	New Cut Road, Vinters			20 July 1984	TQ7753456085; 51°16′35″N 0°32′38″E		1185724	Upload Photo	Q26481028
Ha Ha in Grounds of Vinters Circa 3 1/2 Yards South of Section 150 Yards from Tvs Studios	II	New Cut Road, Vinters			20 July 1984	TQ7761356242; 51°16′39″N 0°32′43″E		1086241	Upload Photo	Q26376355
Ha Ha in Grounds of Vinters with North West Corner Circa 150 Yards South West of Tvs Studios	II	New Cut Road, Vinters			20 July 1984	TQ7761856327; 51°16′42″N 0°32′43″E		1185722	Upload Photo	Q26481026
Ha Ha in Grounds of Vinters, with North End Circa 53 Yard North West of East Lodge	II	New Cut Road, Vinters			20 July 1984	TQ7780056163; 51°16′37″N 0°32′52″E		1086242	Upload Photo	Q26376360
Ha Ha in Grounds of Vinters. Circa 1 1/2 Yards South of Section 3 1/2 Yards South of Stretch 150 Yards from Tvs Studios	II	New Cut Road, Vinters			20 July 1984	TQ7758656190; 51°16′38″N 0°32′41″E		1185723	Upload Photo	Q26481027
Warren Farmhouse	II	Pilgrims Way			20 July 1984	TQ7804559163; 51°18′13″N 0°33′10″E		1086243	Upload Photo	Q26376366
The Stonehouse	II	Sandy Lane, Harbourland			20 July 1984	TQ7729157957; 51°17′35″N 0°32′29″E		1185726	Upload Photo	Q26481030
2 Bee Boles in Garden Wall Circa 40 Yards North West of Yew Tree House	II	The Street			20 July 1984	TQ7729558939; 51°18′07″N 0°32′31″E		1086212	Upload Photo	Q26376217
Boxley House	II	The Street			26 April 1968	TQ7744359259; 51°18′17″N 0°32′39″E		1086210	Boxley House More images	Q26376205
Church of St Mary and All Saints	I	The Street			26 April 1968	TQ7749958942; 51°18′07″N 0°32′41″E		1185730	Church of St Mary and All Saints More images	Q7594543
Court Lodge	II	The Street			20 July 1984	TQ7743958929; 51°18′07″N 0°32′38″E		1336242	Upload Photo	Q26620755
Hatchetts Cottage Styles Cottage	II	The Street			20 July 1984	TQ7746259370; 51°18′21″N 0°32′40″E		1086245	Upload Photo	Q26376376
Head Stone Circa 3 1/2 Yards South of South Vestry of Church of St Mary and All Saints	II	The Street			20 July 1984	TQ7750658928; 51°18′06″N 0°32′42″E		1299558	Upload Photo	Q87576263
Head Stone to ?sam Thawes 1/2 Yard East of South Porch of Church of St Mary and All Saints	II	The Street			20 July 1984	TQ7750058933; 51°18′07″N 0°32′42″E		1336265	Upload Photo	Q87576265
Head Stone to Mr John Wise Adjacent to Tombstone to Mrs Elizabeth Wise at Church of St Mary and All Saints	II	The Street			20 July 1984	TQ7747758954; 51°18′07″N 0°32′40″E		1336266	Upload Photo	Q87576266
Head Stone to Wife of Thomas Sell 4 Yards South of South Vestry of Church of St Mary and All Saints	II	The Street			20 July 1984	TQ7750558926; 51°18′06″N 0°32′42″E		1086206	Upload Photo	Q87576254
Headstone to Mrs Elizabeth Wise, Circa 3 Yards North West of Narthex of Church of St Mary and All Saints	II	The Street			20 July 1984	TQ7747758956; 51°18′07″N 0°32′40″E		1086208	Upload Photo	Q87576257
K6 Telephone Kiosk at Junction with Forest Lane	II	The Street			13 May 1988	TQ7736658991; 51°18′09″N 0°32′35″E		1086173	Upload Photo	Q26376061
Malthouse Cottage and Maltings Adjoining	II	The Street			20 July 1984	TQ7734058926; 51°18′07″N 0°32′33″E		1086213	Upload Photo	Q26376223
Monument to Best Family Circa 20 Yards East of Chancel of Church of St Mary and All Saints	II	The Street			20 July 1984	TQ7753958927; 51°18′06″N 0°32′44″E		1086247	Upload Photo	Q87576260
Monument to John Richard Songen Circa 1 Yard South of Obelisk Monuments to Dunning Family in Churchyard of Church of St Mary and All Saints	II	The Street			20 July 1984	TQ7751758924; 51°18′06″N 0°32′42″E		1086207	Upload Photo	Q87576255
Monument to Members of the Dunning Family Circa 4 1/2 Yards South East of Chancel of Church of St Mary and All Saints	II	The Street			20 July 1984	TQ7751758926; 51°18′06″N 0°32′42″E		1185733	Upload Photo	Q87576262
Parsonage Farm	II*	The Street			20 October 1952	TQ7738858895; 51°18′06″N 0°32′36″E		1185727	Upload Photo	Q17545212
Table Tomb 1/2 Yard South of South Aisle and East of Porch of Church of St Mary and All Saints	II	The Street			20 July 1984	TQ7749958930; 51°18′07″N 0°32′41″E		1185732	Upload Photo	Q87576261
Table Tomb Circa 2 Yards South of Narthex of Church of St Mary and All Saints	II	The Street			20 July 1984	TQ7748058942; 51°18′07″N 0°32′40″E		1086246	Upload Photo	Q87576259
Table Tomb to Charles Family Circa One Yard North of Monument to Best Family in Churchyard of Church of St Mary and All Saints	II	The Street			20 July 1984	TQ7753958929; 51°18′06″N 0°32′44″E		1336244	Upload Photo	Q26620757
Table Tomb to Dunning Family One Yard East of Obelisk Monument to Dunning Family in Churchyard of St Mary and All Saints	II	The Street			20 July 1984	TQ7751958925; 51°18′06″N 0°32′42″E		1086248	Upload Photo	Q26376382
Table Tomb to Lushington Family Circa 9 Yards East of Chancel of Church of St Mary and All Saints	II	The Street			20 July 1984	TQ7752758931; 51°18′07″N 0°32′43″E		1336264	Upload Photo	Q87576272
Table Tomb to Memory of Dr Robert Fowler 1/2 Yard South of South Vestry of Church of St Mary and All Saints	II	The Street			20 July 1984	TQ7750758930; 51°18′07″N 0°32′42″E		1299559	Upload Photo	Q87576264
Table Tomb to Memory of Members of Fowler Family Circa 4 Yards South of Chancel of Church of St Mary and All Saints	II	The Street			20 July 1984	TQ7751258928; 51°18′06″N 0°32′42″E		1336245	Upload Photo	Q26620758
The King's Arms	II	The Street			26 April 1968	TQ7736058975; 51°18′08″N 0°32′34″E		1185825	The King's Arms More images	Q26481120
The Old House	II	The Street			20 July 1984	TQ7736759000; 51°18′09″N 0°32′35″E		1086214	Upload Photo	Q26376229
The Old Vicarage	II	The Street			20 July 1984	TQ7741758826; 51°18′03″N 0°32′37″E		1336241	Upload Photo	Q26620754
Yew Trees House	II	The Street			26 April 1968	TQ7732058898; 51°18′06″N 0°32′32″E		1086211	Upload Photo	Q26376212
Table Tomb 6 Yards South of South Aisle, to East of Porch of Church of St Mary and All Saints	II	The Street			20 July 1984	TQ7749858926; 51°18′06″N 0°32′41″E		1336243	Upload Photo	Q26620756
Stone House	II	Weavering Street			26 April 1968	TQ7861156047; 51°16′32″N 0°33′34″E		1185846	Upload Photo	Q26481140
Walnut Tree Farmhouse	II	Weavering Street			20 July 1984	TQ7827055743; 51°16′23″N 0°33′16″E		1086216	Upload Photo	Q26376240
Weavering Manor	II*	1 and 2, Weavering Street			13 July 1978	TQ7838755792; 51°16′24″N 0°33′22″E		1185828	Upload Photo	Q17545223
Yew Tree House	II	Weavering Street			26 April 1968	TQ7850955903; 51°16′28″N 0°33′28″E		1086215	Upload Photo	Q26376234

== See also ==
- Grade I listed buildings in Kent
- Grade II* listed buildings in Kent

== Sources ==
- Newman, John (2012) [1969], Kent: West and the Weald, The Buildings of England, New Haven and London: Yale University Press, ISBN 978-0-300-18509-6
