= Boxley Abbey Barn =

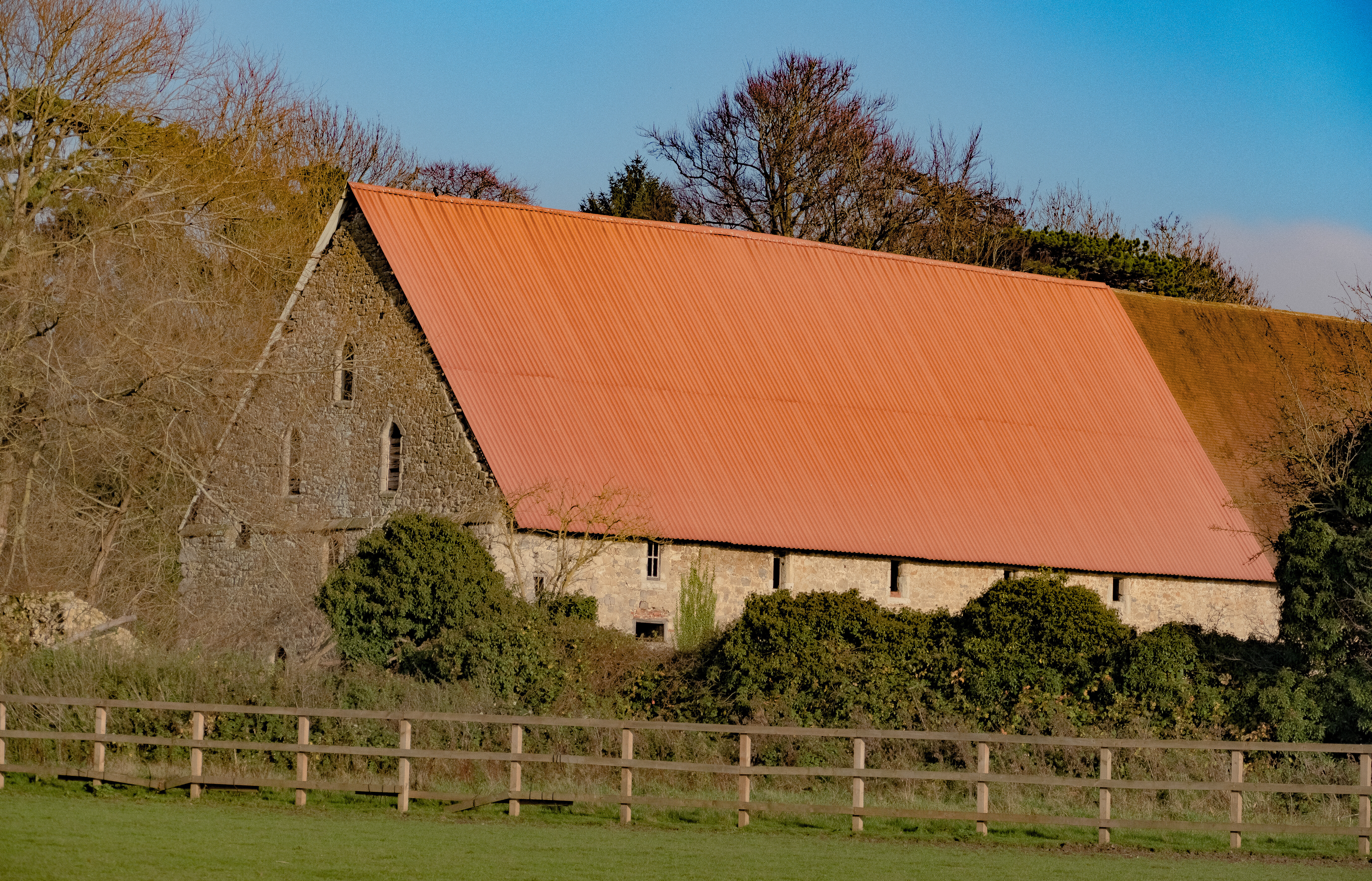
- Boxley Abbey Barn, restored

- Location within Kent

General information
- Location: Boxley, England
- Coordinates: 51.299679°N 0.523554°E
- Completed: Late 13th or early 14th century

Boxley Abbey Barn is a large medieval barn in Sandling near Maidstone in Kent, England.

It is a remnant of the buildings of the mostly demolished Boxley Abbey.

The barn is 186 feet (57 m) long, aligned with its long axis roughly east–west, and was built in the late 13th or early 14th century. It is constructed of local ragstone with two storeys and a plan tiled gable roof. Irregularly sized and placed windows and doors punctuate each of its façades. The building was used by the Abbey as its Hospitium and later as a tithe barn.

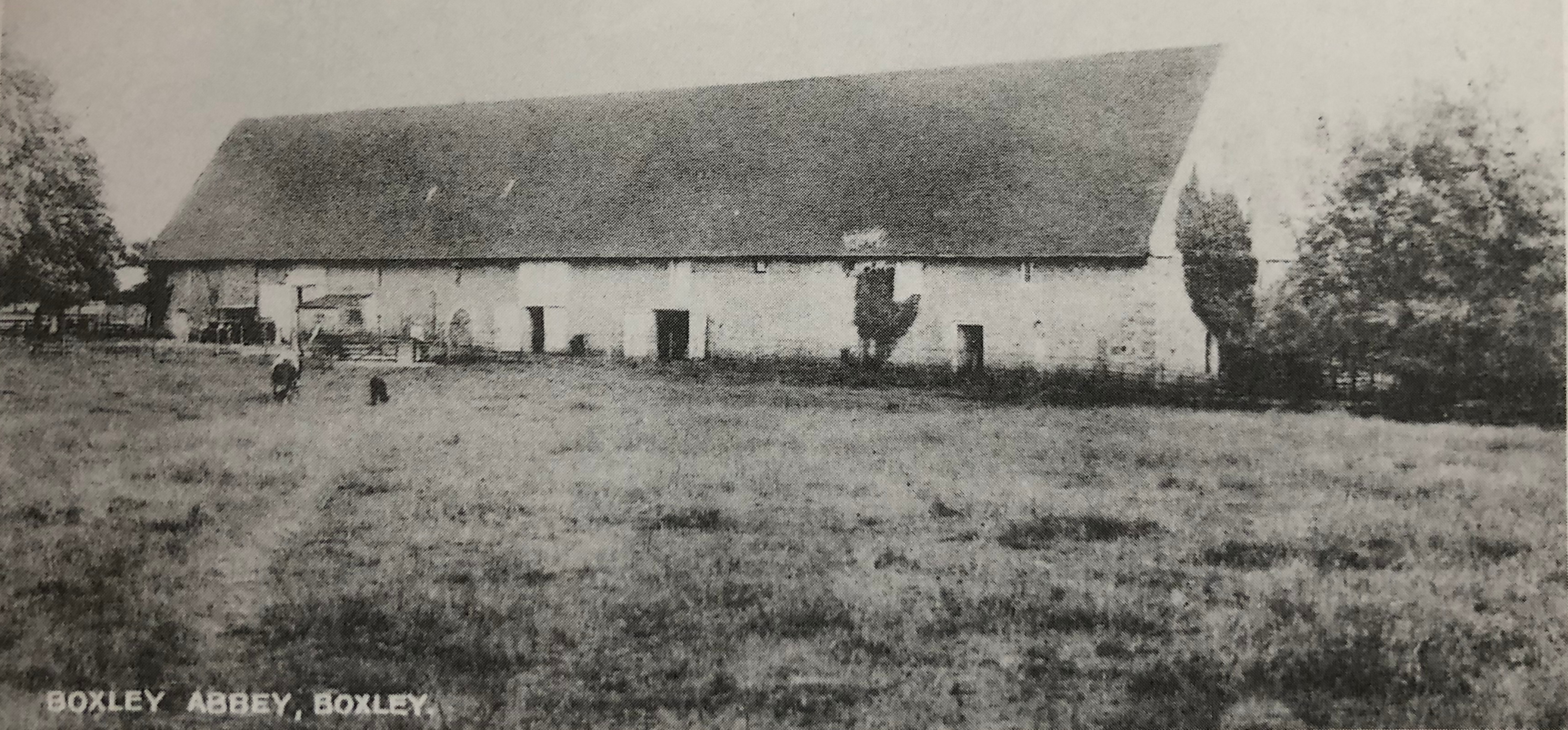
Boxley Abbey Barn, circa 1910

Boxley Abbey Barn is a Grade I listed building and is on the Historic England Heritage at Risk Register. The barn is included as part of the Scheduled monument which covers the site of Boxley Abbey.

== See also ==
- Grade I listed buildings in Maidstone
- List of scheduled monuments in Maidstone
