= Aviad Zigolo MG12 =

Zigolo MG12

General information
- Type: Single-seat kitbuilt ultralight
- National origin: Italy
- Manufacturer: Aviad Francesco Di Martino
- Designer: Francesco Di Martino
- Number built: 56 kits

History
- First flight: 2012

The Aviad Zigolo MG12 is an Italian kitbuilt introductory motor-glider first flown in 2012. It has a small engine and limited gliding performance but is inexpensive to buy and run and simple to build and fly. Kit production began in 2013 and by the following year twenty had been sold.

== Design ==
Designed by Francesco Di Martino, the Zigolo is based on the unpowered Sandlin Goat primary glider. The design priority was to produce a motor-glider which would be inexpensive to build, transport and store. It is marketed as a powered glider but qualifies in the UK as an SSDR (single-seat, deregulated) microlight. Kit build time is quoted as less than 100 hrs. It can be dismantled for transport and reassembled for flight within an hour.

Its structure throughout is based on aluminium tubes, its flying surfaces covered with bonded fabric. It has a high, braced, wing of rectangular plan with blunted tips, rigged with 3° of dihedral. The ailerons occupy the whole of the trailing edges apart from a central gap.

The fuselage is an uncovered tube structure, with the exposed pilot's seat on a pair of tubes which form the basis of the forward section with a curved reinforcing girder under it. The primary wing bracing, V-struts from the wing spars, are attached to them. They meet at the nose, where another tube joins them to the forward spar. Behind the wing the lower fuselage member is a single tube, braced at its forward end by a pair of tubes upwards to the rear spar and at its rear by another long pair to the rear spar. A horizontal pair of tubes from the rear spar to a vertical rudder post, which joins the lower fuselage tube at its base, complete the rear frame. The upper frame supports a straight-edged tailplane with balanced elevators and a balanced rudder which extends from the keel to above the tailplane via an elevator cut-out.

The Zigolo's 18.3 hp (13.6 kW) single-cylinder two-stroke engine is mounted on the fuselage frame in pusher configuration below the wing trailing edge. Its propeller is driven through belt gearing, the top of the propeller disc in the gap between the ailerons. An optional electric engine is also available.

It has fixed landing gear with small mainwheels mounted 1.1 m (3 ft 7 in) apart on split axles hinged from a central pylon below the main fuselage frame. Gas shock absorbers lean in from the axles' extremities to the lower frame. There is a small tailwheel. The Zingalo is fitted with a ballistic parachute mounted on the sloping fuselage member ahead of the pilot.

== Development ==
The Zigolo first flew in 2012 and later that year the prototype was joined by a demonstrator. The first production aircraft appeared at the April 2013 Friedrichshafen show; by then the type had flown more than 300 hrs. Twenty kits had been sold by March 2014 to builders across Europe, China, Japan and the US. There are two on the UK register in 2016.

== Specifications ==
Data from General, Jane's All the World's Aircraft 2015/16; Performance, PilotWeb

General characteristics

- Crew: One
- Length: 5.50 m (18 ft 1 in)
- Wingspan: 11.10 m (36 ft 5 in)
- Height: 1.3 m (4 ft 3 in)
- Wing area: 15.80 m^{2} (170.1 sq ft)
- Empty weight: 95 kg (209 lb)
- Max takeoff weight: 220 kg (485 lb)
- Fuel capacity: 12 L (2.6 imp gal; 3.2 US gal)
- Powerplant: 1 × Vittorazi Moster 185 single cylinder two-stroke, 18.6 kW (24.9 hp)
- Propellers: 2-bladed, 1.4 m (4 ft 7 in) diameter fixed pitch, driven via belt reduction gearing

Performance

- Cruise speed: 67 km/h (41 mph, 36 kn)
- Stall speed: 35 km/h (22 mph, 19 kn)
- Never exceed speed: 93 km/h (58 mph, 50 kn)
- Maximum glide ratio: 11:1 at 52 km/h; 32 mph (28 kn)
- Rate of sink: 1.40 m/s (276 ft/min) engine off, 44 km/h; 28 mph (24 kn)
- Wing loading: 13.9 kg/m^{2} (2.8 lb/sq ft)
