= Tyland Barn =

Nature reserve in Kent, England

Coordinates: 51.306°N 0.515°E

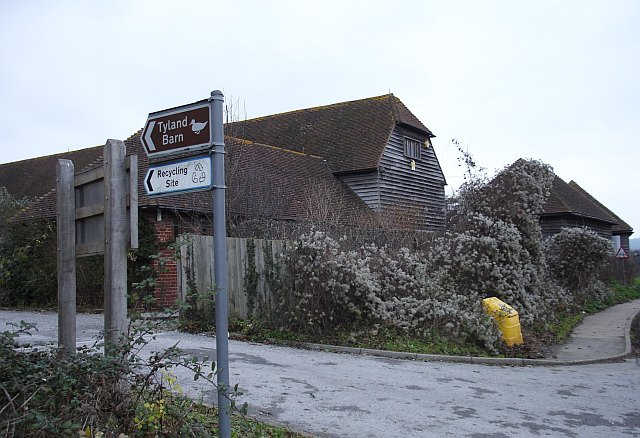
- Interactive map of Tyland Barn
- Type: Nature reserve
- Location: Maidstone, Kent
- Manager: Kent Wildlife Trust

Tyland Barn, in Sandling, north of Maidstone, Kent, is the headquarters of the Kent Wildlife Trust.

It has a nature park which is designed to show the variety of habitats in the county, such as a pond, grassland, a chalk bank, a shingle beach, scrub and hedges.
