= John Hilsey =

English Dominican prior and Bishop of Rochester

The Right Reverend John Hilsey
- Bishop of Rochester
- Church: Church of England
- Diocese: Diocese of Rochester
- Predecessor: John Fisher
- Successor: Nicholas Heath
- Other post: Dominican prior

Orders
- Consecration: 18 September 1535 by Thomas Cranmer

Personal details
- Died: 4 August 1539
- Buried: Rochester Cathedral
- Denomination: Roman Catholic, later Anglican
- Education: Oxford University

John Hilsey (a.k.a. Hildesley or Hildesleigh; died 4 August 1539) was an English Dominican, prior provincial of his order, then an agent of Henry VIII and the English Reformation, and Bishop of Rochester.

== Life ==
According to Anthony Wood, Hilsey was a member of the Hildesley family of East Ilsley in Berkshire. He entered the Order of Preachers at Bristol, and then moved to the Dominican house at Oxford, where in May 1527, he graduated B.D., and proceeded D.D. in 1532; it is probable that he studied also at Cambridge. In May 1533 he was prior of the Dominican house at Bristol, and wrote a letter to Thomas Cromwell, whom he apparently regarded as his patron, and with whom he seems to have had earlier dealings. This was to explain and excuse his conduct in preaching against Hugh Latimer. He had come across Latimer as a preacher against pilgrimages and other religious traditions, but soon decided that Latimer was more concerned with attacking the abuse of the traditions, rather than the traditions themselves.

In April 1534, Cromwell appointed him provincial of his order, and commissioner, along with George Browne, provincial of the Augustinians, to visit the friaries throughout England. The commissioners were to administer to the friars the oath of allegiance to Henry, Anne Boleyn and their issue, to obtain from them an acknowledgment of the King as head of the national church, and to make inventories of their property. The commissioners visited the London houses 17–20 April, went in May to the friaries within easy reach of London and then turned west. On 21 June, he reported to Cromwell from Exeter, and in July he reached Cardiff in pursuit of two Observantine friars who were trying to leave the kingdom.

In 1535, on the martyrdom of Saint John Fisher, Hilsey succeeded him as Bishop of Rochester, consecrated on 18 September by Archbishop Thomas Cranmer at Winchester. He begged Cromwell for his predecessor's mitre, staff and seal, as being himself too poor to procure such things. In January 1536, Hilsey preached at Catherine of Aragon's funeral, alleging that, in the hour of death, she had acknowledged that she had never been Queen of England. In March, he obtained a faculty from Cromwell enabling him to remain prior of the London Dominicans and, when they were dispersed, he received a pension.

In 1536, he exercised the duties of censor of the press for the king. On 12 February 1538 he denounced the Rood of Grace of Boxley Abbey in Kent as a fraud, exhibiting its machinery and breaking it to pieces. On 24 November 1538, he preached at St Paul's Cross on the blood of Hailes Abbey, Gloucestershire as a "feigned relic". He affirmed it to be clarified honey and saffron.

In November 1538, as perpetual commendatory of the Dominicans in London, he surrendered the house into the king's hands. He died on 4 August 1539, and was buried in Rochester Cathedral.

== Works ==
Hilsey was occupied, during his last years, in compiling, at Cromwell's order, a service-book in English. It appeared in after his death in 1539 as the Prymer. This has a dedication by Hilsey to Cromwell and an elaborate 'instruction of the sacrament', besides some shorter explanatory prologues. Less radical than the 1535 Prymer of William Marshall, it was also evangelical with anti-Catholic polemics incorporated and integrated in the text with devotional material, and ultimately was more influential; Hilsey's arrangement of the Epistles and Gospels is substantially the same as in the later prayer books. The book was republished in great part as The Prymer both in Englyshe and Latin in 1540; there was an edition in Edward Burton's Three Primers Put Forth in the Reign of Henry VIII (1834). Hilsey also prepared a juvenile version of his primer, and wrote De veri Corporis Esu in Sacramento which was dedicated to Cromwell and was mentioned in John White's Discosio-Martyrion (1553), on the Catholic doctrine of the Eucharist. Works also ascribed to Hilsey include Resolutions concerning the Sacraments and Resolutions of some Questions relating to Bishops, Priests, and Deaconns, but he apparently only assisted the compilation of these documents. He also helped to compile The Institution of a Christian Man.

== Notes ==
Church of England titles
Preceded by John Fisher	Bishop of Rochester; 1535–1539	Succeeded by Nicholas Heath
