= Boxley =

Village in Kent, England

Coordinates: 51.302424°N 0.542887°E

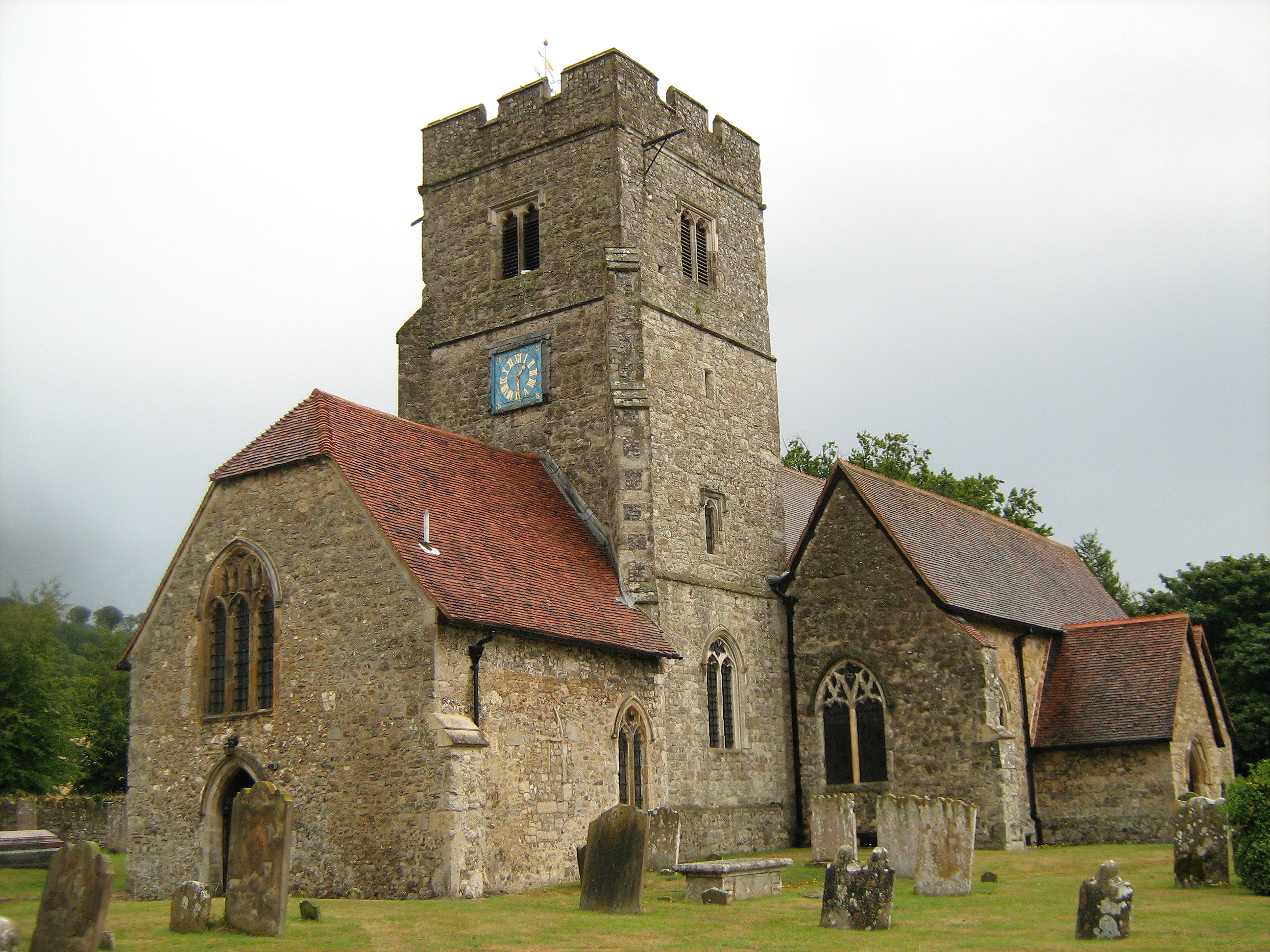
- St. Mary and All Saints, Boxley

- Location within Kent
- Population: 9,554 (2011 Census)
- District: Maidstone
- Shire county: Kent
- Region: South East
- Country: England
- Sovereign state: United Kingdom
- Post town: Maidstone
- Postcode district: ME14
- Police: Kent
- Fire: Kent
- Ambulance: South East Coast
- UK Parliament: Faversham and Mid Kent

Boxley is a village and civil parish in the Maidstone District of Kent, England.

It lies below the slope of the North Downs approximately 2 miles (3.2 km) northeast of the centre of Maidstone town. The civil parish has a population of 7,144 (2001 census), increasing to 9,554 at the 2011 Census, and extends to the north and east of the town including the settlements of Boxley itself, Grove Green, most of Weavering Street, Sandling and the southern extremities of Walderslade and Lordswood at the top of Blue Bell Hill.

The M2 and M20 motorways cross the parish to the north and south of Boxley village and the High Speed 1 railway line passes to the south in cuttings and tunnel. Despite being so close to Maidstone and two motorways, the village is surrounded by woodland, and still retains a village feel. The ruins of Boxley Abbey, in neighbouring Sandling, fall within the parish.

== Notable buildings ==
The St Mary and All Saints parish church in Boxley village and the Abbey Barn, in Sandling, are Grade I listed buildings and the site of the abbey is a scheduled monument. Parsonage Farm in Boxley, Boxley Abbey House and St Andrew's Chapel in Sandling, and Weavering Manor in Weavering Street, are all Grade II* listed.

The Pilgrims' Way trackway and the North Downs Way pass through the parish. Boxley village was used for scenes in the film version of Porridge.

Within the parish are the Kent Life open-air museum, in Sandling, and Vinters Valley Nature Reserve. A 19th-century granary from Boxley was dismantled and re-erected at Kent Life.

"Vinters" was a country house and home to the Whatman family until it was demolished in the 1950s. Susanna Whatman was the first of her family to manage the house and the guide she wrote was published in 1952 - about 200 years after her birth.

The Maidstone Studios are located within the parish.

== See also ==
- Listed buildings in Boxley
