= Boxley Abbey =

Former Cistercian monastery in Kent, England

Coordinates: 51°18′01″N 0°31′29″E

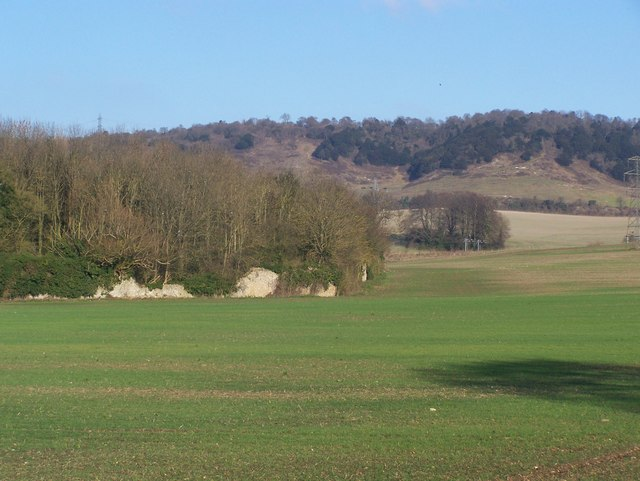
Remains of Boxley Abbey and North Downs

Boxley Abbey was a Cistercian monastery in Sandling, near Maidstone in Kent, England. It sits at the foot of the North Downs and falls within the parish of Boxley.

The abbey was founded around 1146, and dissolved in 1538.

Its ruins can be found north of Maidstone, just northeast of the M20-A229 Sandling Interchange.

== Medieval history ==
The abbey was founded in around 1146 by William of Ypres, leader of King Stephen of England's Flemish mercenaries, and populated by monks from Clairvaux Abbey in Ville-sous-la-Ferté, France. In the mid-12th century, it appears that the permanent abbey buildings were constructed, under the abbacy of Thomas, elected in 1152 or 1153. In 1171, the then abbot was one of those responsible for the burial of the murdered archbishop of Canterbury, Thomas Becket. In 1193 the abbots of Boxley and Robertsbridge journeyed to the continent to search for King Richard I, finally locating him in Bavaria.

The cloister was rebuilt in the late 14th century, as is known from the surviving contract of 1373 between the abbey and the mason Stephen Lomherst. During 1512-13, the abbot appealed to the crown to arrest four of the monks, accusing them of rebelliousness.

== The relics ==
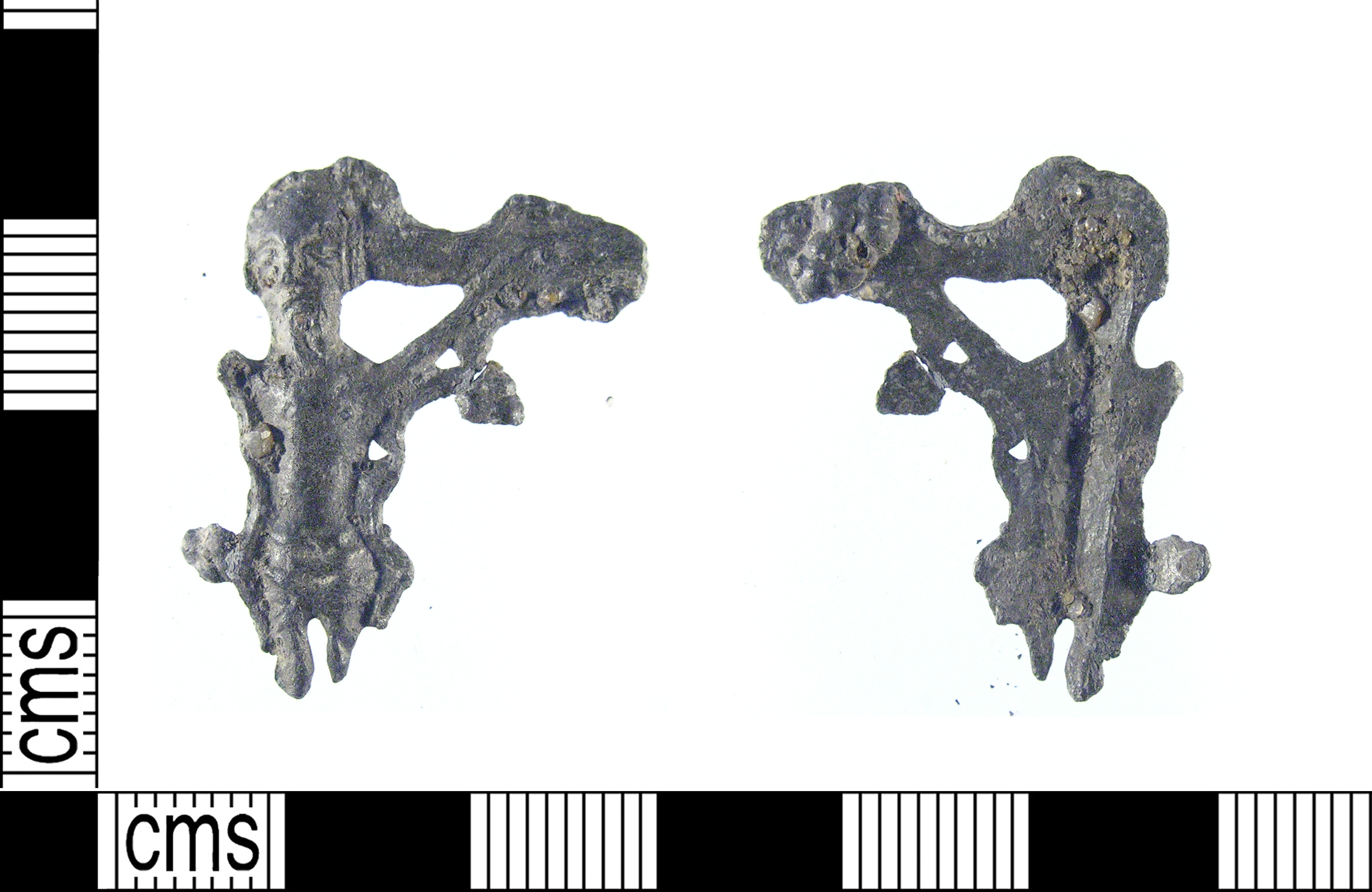
Fragment of cast-lead pilgrims' badge (showing front and back) depicting the Rood

The abbey was famous, and later infamous, for a relic known as the Rood of Grace, a wooden cross, the figure upon which was supposed to miraculously move and speak. In 1538 during the Dissolution of the Monasteries one Geoffrey Chamber, a "commissioner" employed by Thomas Cromwell to oversee the closure of the institution, examined the famed relic and discovered it to be a fake, observing the levers and wires that enacted the so-called miracles. The rood was taken down and displayed in Maidstone market so as to demonstrate the fraud. Finally, it was sent to London and to the accompaniment of a mocking sermon from John Hilsey, Bishop of Rochester, it was hacked to pieces in front of St Paul's Cathedral and burnt.

There is no evidence that any miracles were ever associated with the moving image, notwithstanding the monks' practice of infiltrating hired imposters into the throng to celebrate the supposed cures. However, the presence of wires and levers in themselves does not constitute fraud; theatrical historian Leanne Groeneveld contends that this "puppetry" was presented as a theatrical show to a fully cognisant audience. Diarmaid MacCulloch, a biographer of Thomas Cromwell, notes that moveable parts, "for devotional and not fraudulent purposes", were occasionally a feature of religious statuary made during the twelfth century, the date of this figure.

A legend that an effigy of the infant Saint Rumbold could only be lifted from its plinth by the particularly righteous was exploited by the monks, who engaged or disengaged a hidden bolt under the statue, according to the size of the cash gift on offer. The supposed finger of the apostle Andrew, inlaid heavily with silver, was also on display but was pawned to a local merchant for eleven pounds when the flow of "credulous and devout" visitors ceased.

== The Dissolution and beyond ==
The abbey appears to have been "surrendered" to the king, or dissolved, on 29 January 1537 (in the 28th year of the reign on Henry.) The site of the abbey and many of its manorial estates were granted to Sir Thomas Wyatt in 1540. After the dissolution the west range and abbot's house were transformed into a house with the remainder virtually demolished. Parts survive within the present mainly 19th-century Boxley Abbey House, and there are some fragmentary remains of the church still standing, principally a doorway in the south aisle. Of the buildings round the cloister, the main survivals are in the south range, where the warming room is used as an outbuilding and some ruins of the refectory still stand. Boxley Abbey Barn, a large 13th-century stone building which served as the abbey's Hospitium, also remains. It is a Grade I listed building. The precinct of the abbey is a scheduled monument. It is surrounded by the ruins of the precinct wall, and entered through a ruined gatehouse. The site is private. The parish church of St Mary and All Saints in Boxley village was associated with the abbey. The former chapel of St Andrew was likely associated with the abbey. It was converted to a house at the Dissolution, and is currently (2024) under restoration by the Society for the Protection of Ancient Buildings as their 'Old House Project'.

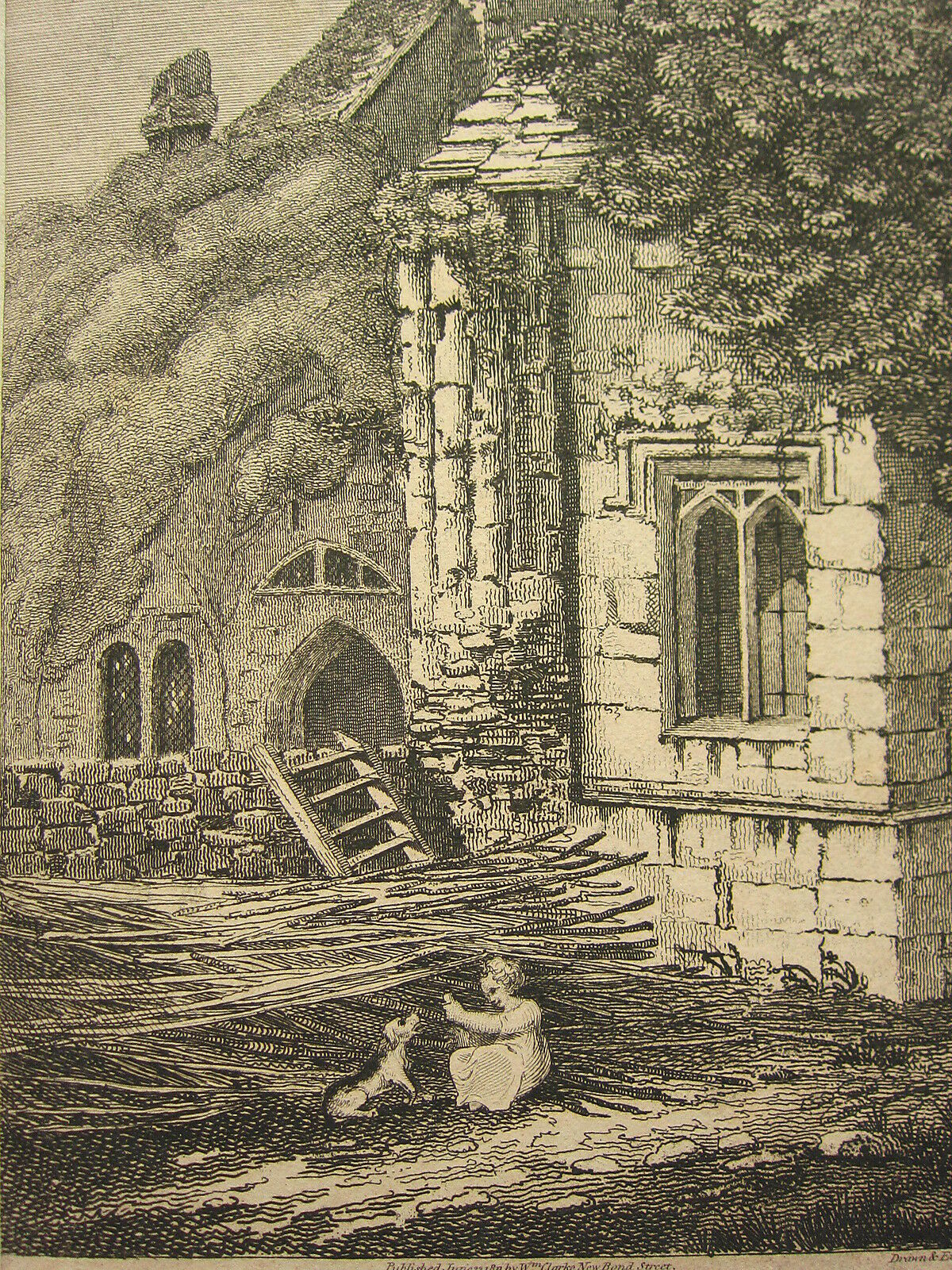
Boxley Abbey ruins, 1811 (now gone)

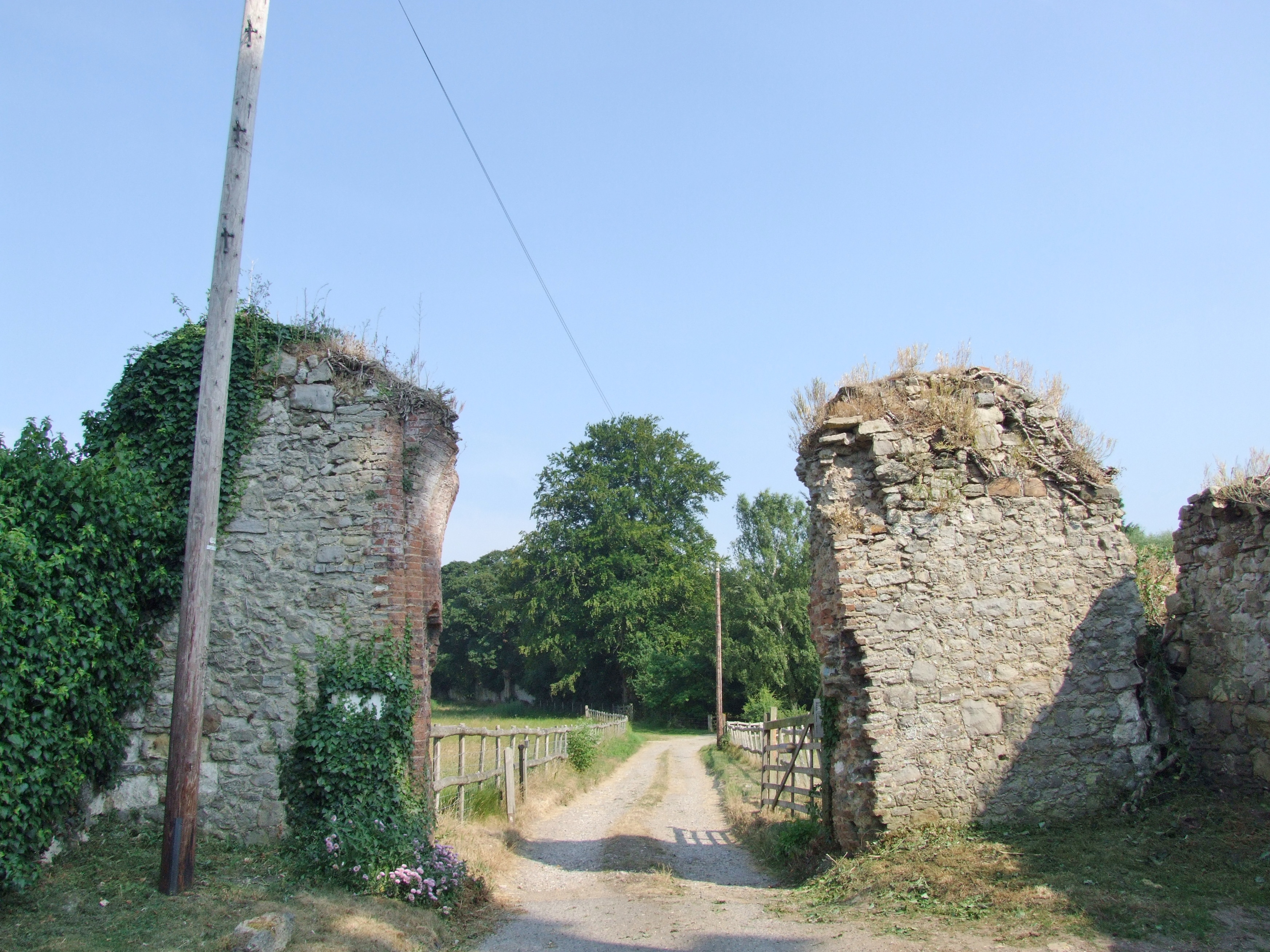
Ruins of the Abbey's gateway

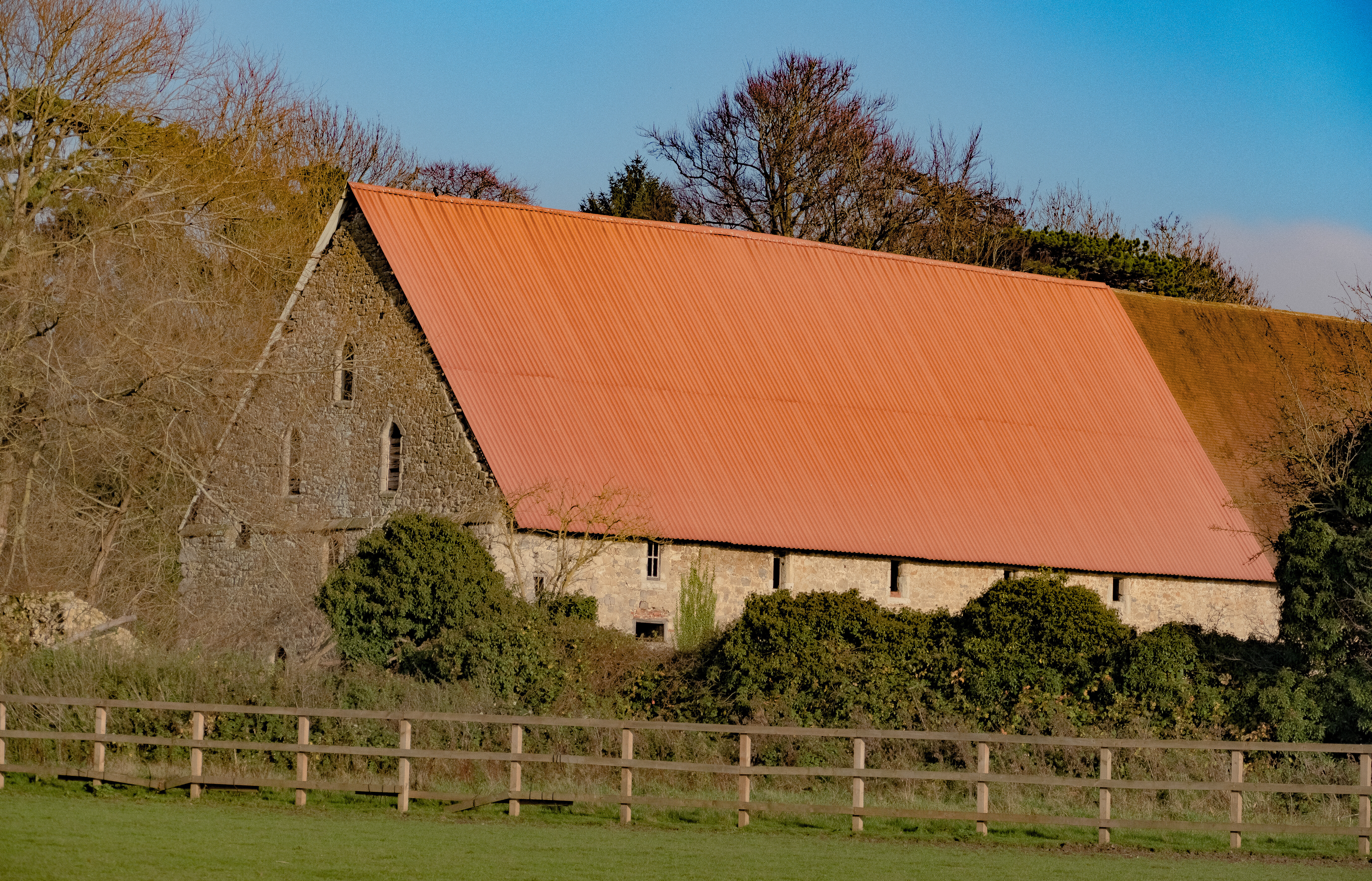
The Abbey's hospitium, now Boxley Abbey Barn, re-roofed

== See also ==
- List of scheduled monuments in Maidstone

== Bibliography ==
- Houses of Cistercian monks: The abbey of Boxley, A History of the County of Kent: Volume 2 (1926), pp. 153–55.
- Anthony New. A Guide to the Abbeys of England And Wales, p75-76. Constable.
