= Sandlin Goat =

American ultralight glider

Goat
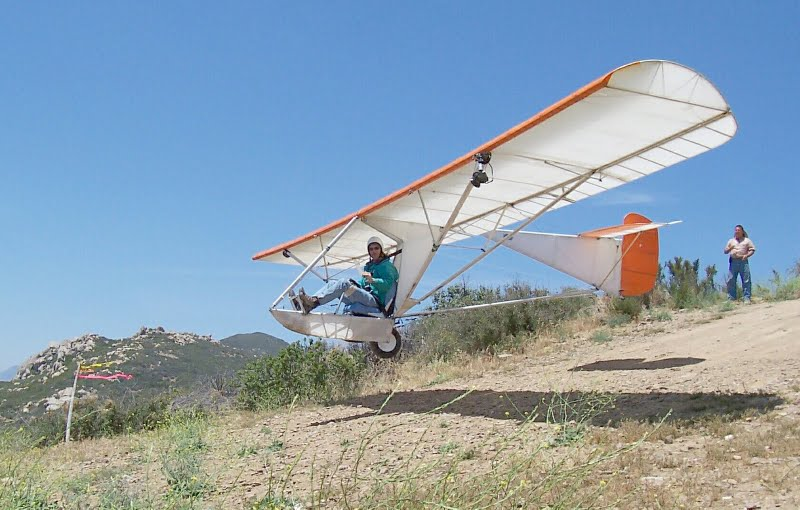
- Sandlin Goat

General information
- Type: Glider
- National origin: United States
- Designer: Mike Sandlin
- Status: Technical drawings available

History
- Introduction date: 2003
- First flight: February 1, 2003
- Developed from: Sandlin Bug
- Variant: Aviad Zigolo MG12

The Sandlin Goat is an American parasol wing, single-seat, ultralight glider that was designed by Mike Sandlin and is provided in the form of technical drawings for amateur construction.

== Design and development ==
The Goat first flew on February 1, 2003. The aircraft was designed as a monoplane development of the biplane Bug. Like the Bug it is intended to be an inexpensive and easy-to-fly three-axis-controlled aircraft similar to a primary glider, although the designer terms it an airchair. The Goat has an empty weight of under 155 lb (70 kg) and so qualifies to be flown under the United States FAR 103 Ultralight Vehicles regulations and does not require registration or a pilot license. The aircraft is made available as technical drawings, not plans, to allow potential builders to study them. Sandlin makes his computer assisted design drawings available free of charge as downloads in .dxf, .dwf and .gif formats and has explicitly released them to the public domain. The Goat 1 drawings consist of 71 sheets. The designer considers his aviation activities a hobby only.

The aircraft is predominately made from bolted-together aluminium tube and covered with heat-shrunk Dacron fabric. The wing ribs are made from fiberglass, graphite rod and epoxy resin over Styrofoam. It has a 36 ft (11.0 m) span wing supported by lift struts and jury struts or, alternatively, cable bracing. Controls are conventional three-axis, with the ailerons and elevator controlled by a center stick and rudder controlled by pedals. The landing gear is a fixed monowheel gear. The pilot sits on an open cockpit seat without a windshield and is secured with a four-point harness. The aircraft is designed to be car-top transportable and can be assembled by one person.

The Goat is designed to be launched by aerotow behind an ultralight aircraft, auto-tow, winch-launch or by rolling it down a slope. It is flown for soaring and is not recommended for aerobatics.

== Operational history ==
One Goat was flown on a cross-country flight of more than 60 mi (97 km) that exceeded 13,000 ft (3,962 m).

== Variants ==
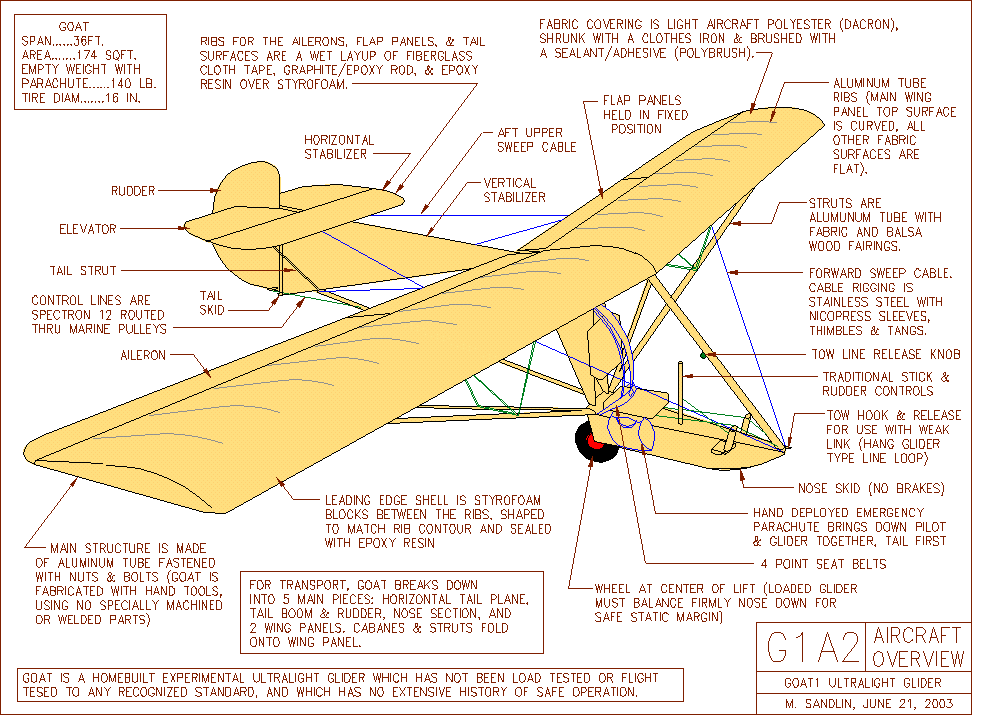
Goat 1 overview, from Sandlin's public domain set of technical drawings

Goat 1
Initial version, first flown February 1, 2003, with "V" lift struts and jury struts that fold onto the wing for transport. Landing gear is a 16 in (41 cm) monowheel. Drawings are still available.
Goat 2
Lighter-weight version, with a kingpost and steel cable-bracing in place of struts and push-pull tubes eliminated in favor of cables. Landing gear is a 14 in (36 cm) monowheel. Drawings no longer available as it has been replaced by the Goat 4.
Goat 3
Short-wing version, with "V" lift struts and jury struts similar to the Goat 1, plus a higher-speed airfoil. Drawings are still available.

Goat 4
Standard-wing version, uses the cable-braced Goat 2 wing with Goat 3 nose and tail. Drawings are still available.

== Specifications (Goat 1) ==
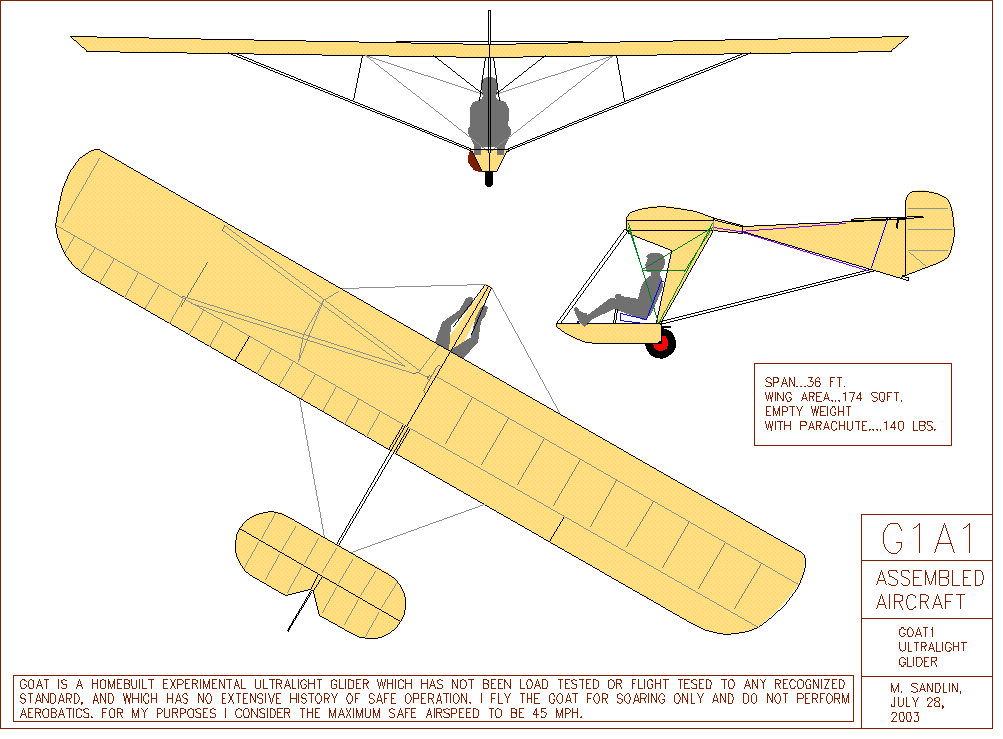
Three-view drawing of the Goat 1

Data from Bertrand and Sandlin

General characteristics

- Crew: one
- Length: 17.08 ft (5.21 m)
- Wingspan: 36 ft (11 m)
- Wing area: 174 sq ft (16.2 m^{2})
- Empty weight: 140 lb (64 kg) with emergency airframe parachute
- Gross weight: 300 lb (136 kg)

Performance

- Stall speed: 22 mph (35 km/h, 19 kn)
- Never exceed speed: 45 mph (72 km/h, 39 kn)
- Wing loading: 1.7 lb/sq ft (8.3 kg/m^{2})

== See also ==
Aircraft of comparable role, configuration, and era

- US Aviation Super Floater

Related lists

- List of gliders
