= Sandlin Bug =

American ultralight glider

Bug
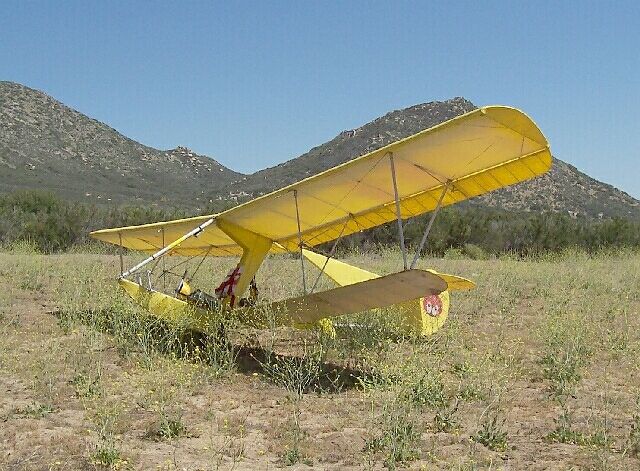
- Sandlin Bug 4

General information
- Type: Glider
- National origin: United States
- Designer: Mike Sandlin
- Status: Technical drawings available

History
- Introduction date: 1999
- First flight: February 1999
- Variant: Sandlin Goat

The Sandlin Bug (Basic Ultralight Glider) is an American biplane, cable-braced, single-seat, ultralight glider that was designed by Mike Sandlin and is provided in the form of technical drawings for amateur construction.

== Design and development ==
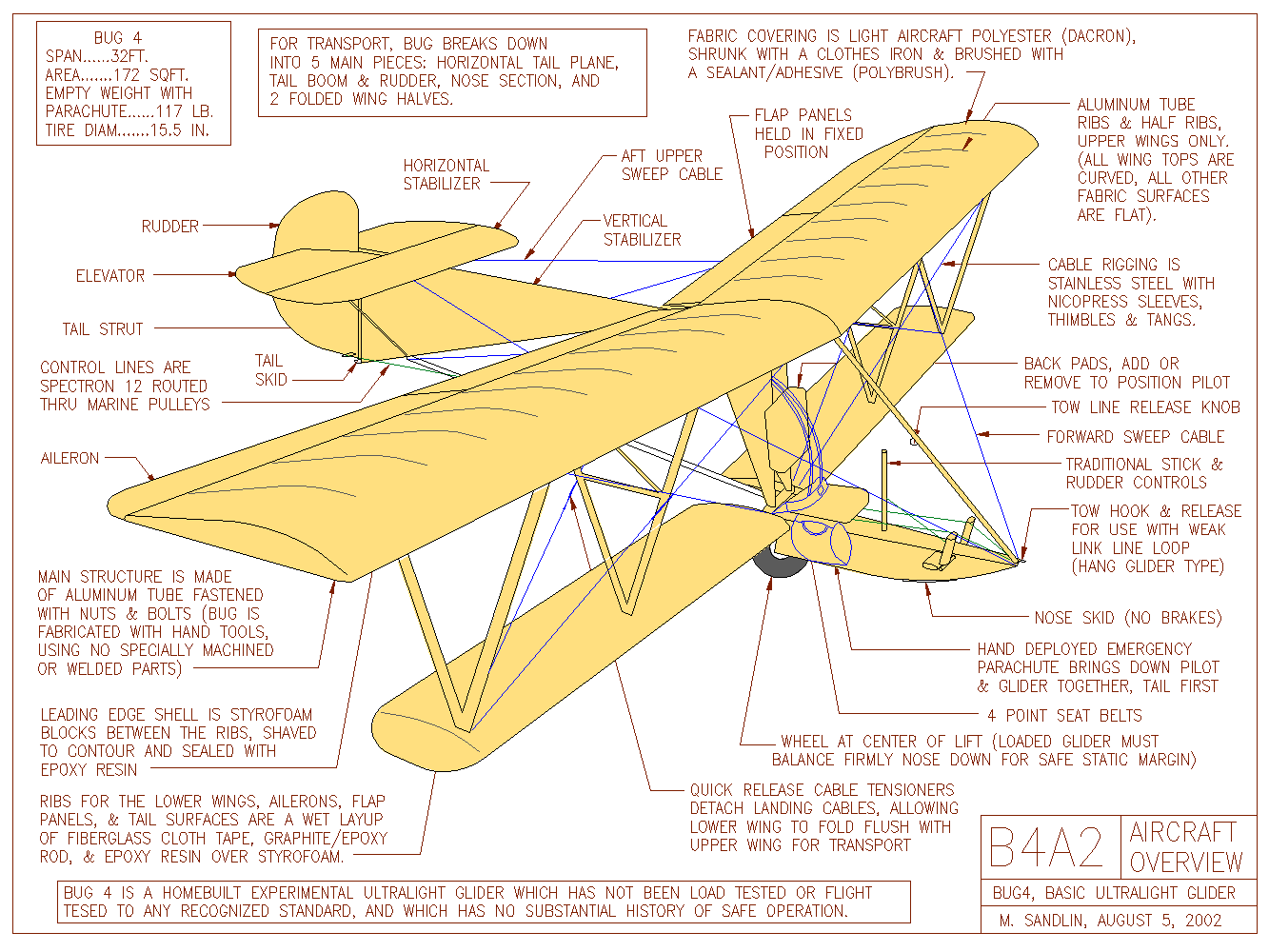
Bug 4 overview, from Sandlin's public domain drawings

The Bug first flew in February 1999. The aircraft was designed to be an inexpensive and easy to fly three-axis controlled aircraft similar to a primary glider, although the designer terms it an airchair. The Bug has an empty weight of under 155 lb (70 kg) and so qualifies to be operated under the United States FAR 103 Ultralight Vehicles regulations. The aircraft is made available as technical drawings, not plans, to allow potential builders to study them. Sandlin makes his computer assisted design drawings available free of charge as downloads in .dxf, .dwf and .gif formats and has explicitly released them to the public domain. The Bug 4 drawings comprise 66 sheets. The designer considers his aviation activities a hobby only.

The aircraft is made from bolted together aluminium tube, braced with steel cables and covered with heat shrunk Dacron fabric. Its 32 ft (9.8 m) span wing uses V-shaped interplane struts. Controls are conventional three-axis, with the ailerons and elevator controlled by a center stick and rudder controlled by pedals. The landing gear is a fixed monowheel gear. The pilot sits on an open cockpit seat without a windshield and is secured with a four-point harness. The aircraft is designed to be car-top transportable and can be assembled by one person.

The Bug is designed to be launched by aerotow behind an ultralight aircraft, auto-tow, winch-launch or by rolling it down a slope. It is flown for soaring and is not recommended for aerobatics.

== Variants ==
Bug 2
Initial version, drawings no longer available.
Bug 4
Improved version, drawings still available.

== Specifications (Bug 4) ==
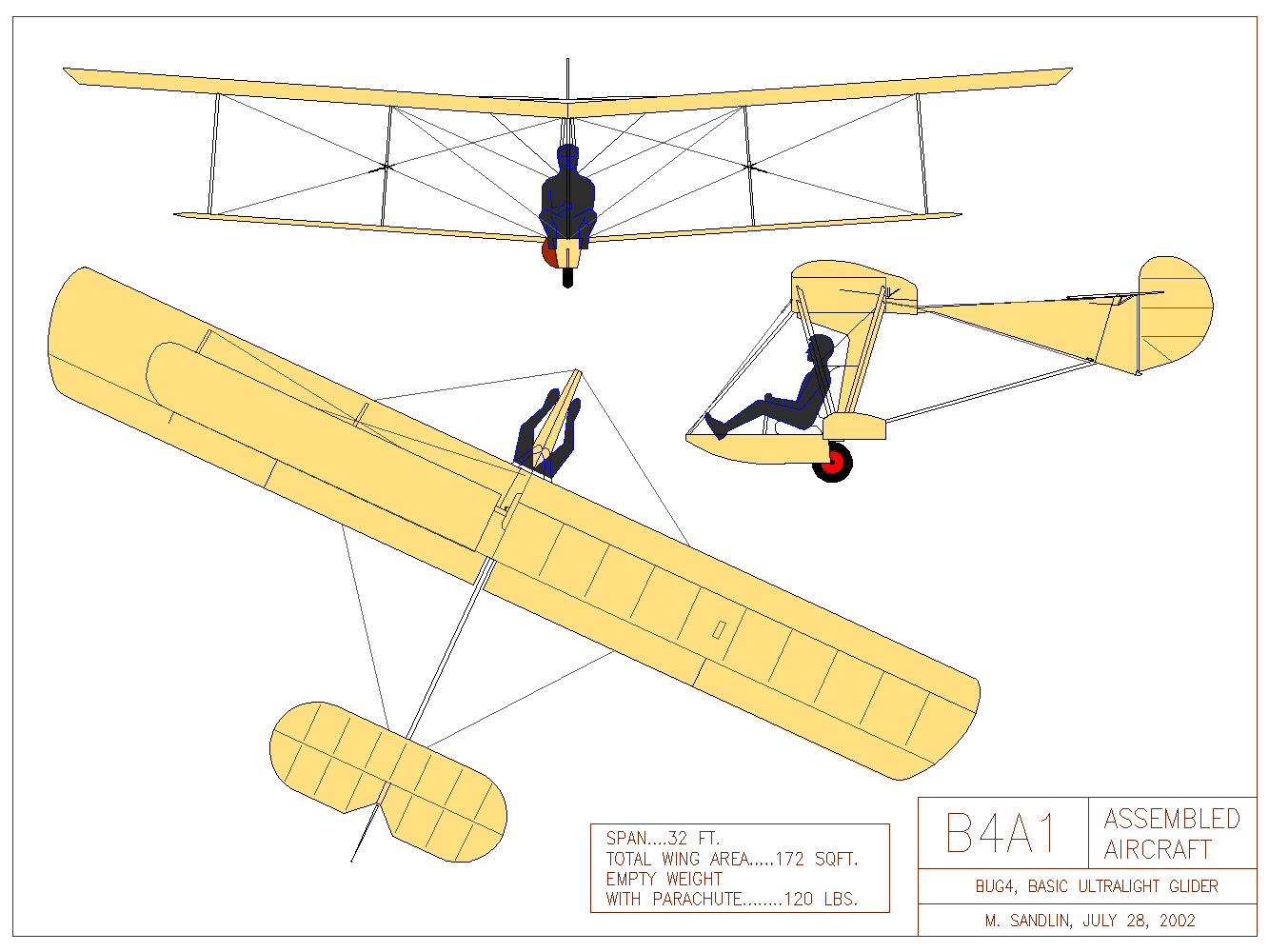
Sandlin Bug three-view, from Sandlin's public domain drawings

Data from Bertrand and Sandlin

General characteristics

- Crew: one
- Length: 17.08 ft (5.21 m)
- Wingspan: 32 ft (9.8 m)
- Wing area: 172 sq ft (16.0 m^{2})
- Empty weight: 120 lb (54 kg) including airframe parachute
- Gross weight: 300 lb (136 kg)

Performance

- Stall speed: 22 mph (35 km/h, 19 kn)
- Never exceed speed: 45 mph (72 km/h, 39 kn)
- Wing loading: 1.7 lb/sq ft (8.3 kg/m^{2})

== See also ==
Aircraft of comparable role, configuration, and era

- US Aviation Super Floater

Related lists

- List of gliders
