= Rood of Grace =

Crucifix kept at Boxley Abbey in Kent in southeast England

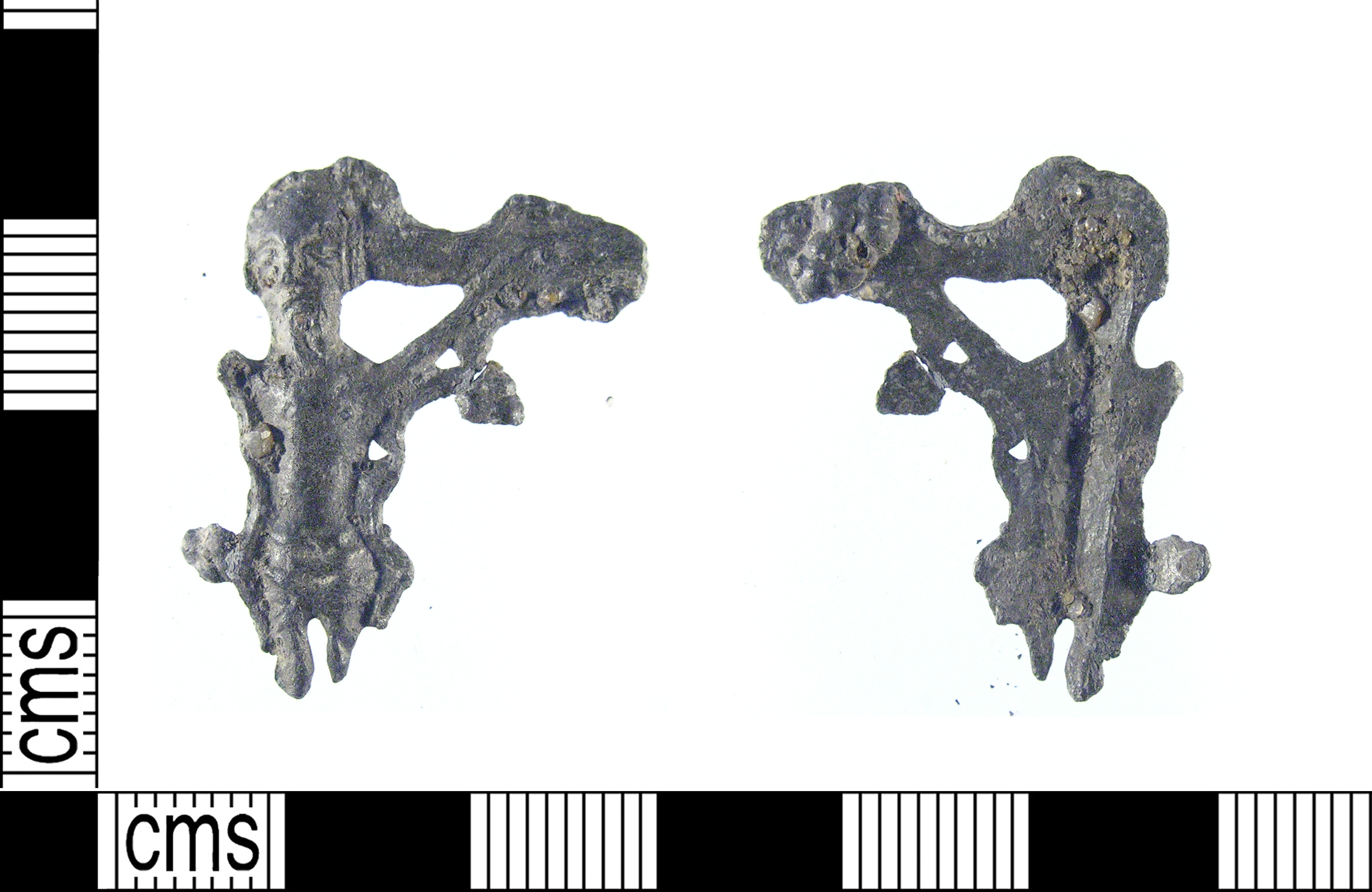
Fragment of cast-lead pilgrims' badge (showing front and back) depicting the Boxley Abbey rood

The Rood of Grace was a crucifix kept at Boxley Abbey in Kent in southeast England. It was a mechanized likeness of Jesus, described by one Protestant iconoclast as an ingenious contraption of wires and rods that made the eyes move like a living thing, and considered spiritually inspirational and a destination for pilgrimages by many of the faithful, including a young Henry VIII.

During the dissolution of the monasteries from 1536 to 1541, aimed mainly at increasing the Crown's revenues, the Rood was used as one argument among many to denounce superstitious religion practices within English Catholicism. However it has been argued that the artificial nature of the work was well-understood by its pre-Reformation audiences, or at least most of them.

== Roman Catholic icon ==
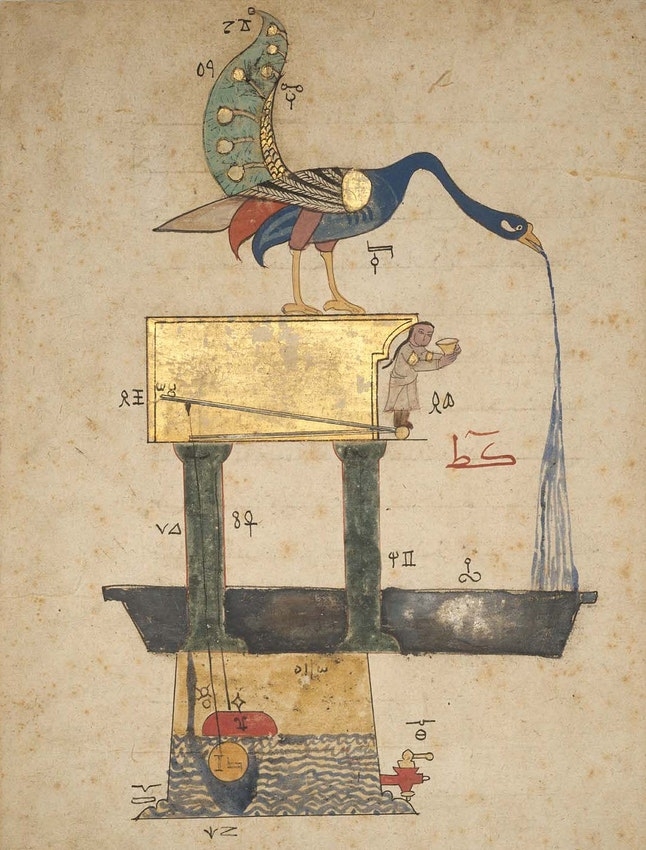
14th-century automaton, powered by water and levers (as was the Rood of Grace)

According to tradition, the Rood was brought to Boxley Abbey on a stray horse. Considering that a miracle, the monks of the abbey took the crucifix. William Lambarde, in his 1570 book, Perambulation of Kent, describes how the Rood was created by an English carpenter taken prisoner by the French in order to ransom himself. According to various reports, the Rood was able to move, shed tears, foam at the mouth, turn and nod its head, and make various facial expressions.

== Protestant response ==
After the dissolution of the monasteries, the Rood was paraded around various market towns, including Maidstone, Kent. On 12 February 1538 John Hilsey, Bishop of Rochester, denounced the Rood of Grace as a fraud, exhibited its machinery and broke it to pieces. The Rood was eventually burned in London along with numerous statues of Roman Catholic saints.

According to Reilly, sermons and reports by the Protestant iconoclasts who attacked the Rood presumed that the Catholic authorities were misrepresenting the Rood; however, "Catholic audiences had seen mechanical theatrical mirabilia or miracles in the medieval cycle plays for generations." (Reilly notes an animated serpent winding around the tree in the garden, mechanical jaws of hell, and cords used to make a dove descend at Pentecost). The Protestant iconoclasts who presented the Rood as a fraud perpetuated by deceitful monks on gullible followers stood to gain politically from spreading that version of the story, yet Groeneveld argues the Rood was, in its time, "acknowledged, even advertised, to be a mechanical marvel".

== See also ==
- List of statues of Jesus
