= Listed buildings in Otham =

Civil Parish in Kent, England

Otham is a village and civil parish in the Borough of Maidstone of Kent, England. It contains three grade I, two grade II* and 21 grade II listed buildings that are recorded in the National Heritage List for England.

This list is based on the information retrieved online from Historic England.

== Key ==
| Grade | Criteria |
|---|---|
| I | Buildings that are of exceptional interest |
| II* | Particularly important buildings of more than special interest |
| II | Buildings that are of special interest |

== Listing ==
| Name | Grade | Location | Type | Completed (Note: The date given is the date used by Historic England as significant for the initial building or that of an important part in the structure's description.) | Date designated | Grid ref. (Note: The grid reference is based on the British national grid reference system, sometimes known as OSGB36, used by the Ordnance Survey.) Geo-coordinates | Notes | Entry number (Note: The "List Entry Number" is a unique number assigned to each listed building and scheduled monument by Historic England.) | Image | Wikidata |
|---|---|---|---|---|---|---|---|---|---|---|
| Bishops | II | Avery Lane | | | 25 July 1952 | TQ8006552642; 51°14′40″N 0°34′42″E | | 1250689 | Upload Photo | Q26542723 |
| Church House | II | Church Road | | | 26 February 1987 | TQ7884754090; 51°15′29″N 0°33′42″E | | 1250722 | Upload Photo | Q26542753 |
| Church of St Nicholas | I | Church Road | | | 23 May 1967 | TQ7891754081; 51°15′28″N 0°33′46″E | | 1250738 | Church of St Nicholas More images | Q7594941 |
| Gore Court | II* | Church Road | | | 25 July 1952 | TQ7906253261; 51°15′01″N 0°33′52″E | | 1250699 | Upload Photo | Q17545274 |
| Monument About 11.5 Metres North West of Nave of Church of St Nicholas | II | Church Road | | | 26 February 1987 | TQ7890854100; 51°15′29″N 0°33′45″E | | 1250769 | Upload Photo | Q26542796 |
| Monument to Thomas Carter About 16 Metres South West of Nave of Church of St Nicholas | II | Church Road | | | 26 February 1987 | TQ7888954065; 51°15′28″N 0°33′44″E | | 1263092 | Upload Photo | Q26553905 |
| The Rectory | II | Church Road | | | 23 May 1967 | TQ7891353781; 51°15′18″N 0°33′45″E | | 1263096 | Upload Photo | Q26553909 |
| Greenhill Cottage | II | Green Hill | | | 23 May 1967 | TQ7980553973; 51°15′24″N 0°34′31″E | | 1263078 | Upload Photo | Q26553892 |
| Greenhill House | II | Green Hill | | | 26 February 1987 | TQ7984154005; 51°15′25″N 0°34′33″E | | 1250823 | Upload Photo | Q26542845 |
| Ivy Cottage | II | Green Hill | | | 15 March 1983 | TQ7981953936; 51°15′22″N 0°34′32″E | | 1250794 | Upload Photo | Q26542820 |
| Barn at TQ 804 530 | II | Holly Farm Road | | | 18 December 1985 | TQ8047753005; 51°14′52″N 0°35′04″E | | 1060931 | Upload Photo | Q26314078 |
| Holly Farmhouse | II | Holly Farm Road | | | 18 December 1985 | TQ8040152952; 51°14′50″N 0°35′00″E | | 1068758 | Upload Photo | Q26321452 |
| Belks White Cottage | II | Otham Street | | | 26 February 1987 | TQ7971553246; 51°15′00″N 0°34′25″E | | 1263042 | Upload Photo | Q26553863 |
| Elizabethan Lodge and Tudor Cottage | II | Otham Street | | | 26 February 1987 | TQ7981953631; 51°15′13″N 0°34′32″E | | 1250866 | Upload Photo | Q26542884 |
| Former Oasthouse About 20 Metres North of Belks | II | Otham Street | | | 26 February 1987 | TQ7972253293; 51°15′02″N 0°34′26″E | | 1263013 | Upload Photo | Q26553839 |
| Garden Wall Terminating About 4 Metres East of South Gable End of Madam Taylors | II | Otham Street | | | 26 February 1987 | TQ7981353669; 51°15′14″N 0°34′31″E | | 1250974 | Upload Photo | Q26542980 |
| Holly Tree House | II | Otham Street | | | 26 February 1987 | TQ7972953251; 51°15′00″N 0°34′26″E | | 1250892 | Upload Photo | Q26542907 |
| Madam Taylors Cottages | II | Otham Street | | | 23 May 1967 | TQ7979153698; 51°15′15″N 0°34′30″E | | 1250967 | Upload Photo | Q26542973 |
| Otham Manor | I | Otham Street | | | 25 July 1952 | TQ7974753504; 51°15′09″N 0°34′28″E | | 1250941 | Otham Manor More images | Q7108551 |
| Rose Cottage | II | Otham Street | | | 26 February 1987 | TQ7970253255; 51°15′01″N 0°34′25″E | | 1250868 | Upload Photo | Q26542886 |
| Synyards, and path between front door and road | I | Otham Street | | | 25 July 1952 | TQ7973453120; 51°14′56″N 0°34′26″E | | 1263084 | Upload Photo | Q7662947 |
| The Limes | II | Otham Street | | | 23 May 1967 | TQ7974653210; 51°14′59″N 0°34′27″E | | 1250856 | Upload Photo | Q26542874 |
| Tulip Cottage and Lilac Cottage | II | Otham Street | | | 26 February 1987 | TQ7972353234; 51°15′00″N 0°34′26″E | | 1250875 | Upload Photo | Q26542891 |
| The Orchard Spot Public House | II | Spot Lane | | | 26 February 1987 | TQ7941354309; 51°15′35″N 0°34′12″E | | 1250979 | Upload Photo | Q26542984 |
| Stoneacre and Path Between Front Door and Road | II* | Stoneacre Lane | | | 25 July 1952 | TQ7998053494; 51°15′08″N 0°34′40″E | | 1250995 | Stoneacre and Path Between Front Door and Road More images | Q7619096 |
| Bicknor Farmhouse | II | Sutton Road | | | 23 May 1967 | TQ7940752207; 51°14′27″N 0°34′08″E | | 1251010 | Upload Photo | Q26543012 |

== See also ==
- Grade I listed buildings in Kent
- Grade II* listed buildings in Kent

== Sources ==
- Newman, John (2012) [1969], Kent: West and the Weald, The Buildings of England, New Haven and London: Yale University Press, ISBN 978-0-300-18509-6
