= Grade I listed buildings in Maidstone =

Maidstone within Kent

There are 42 Grade I listed buildings in Maidstone. The Borough of Maidstone is a local government district in the English county of Kent. The district covers a largely rural area of 152 square miles (394 km^{2}) between the North Downs and the Weald with the town of Maidstone, the county town of Kent, in the north-west. The district has a population of approximately 166,400 in 2016.

In the United Kingdom, the term listed building refers to a building or other structure officially designated as being of special architectural, historical or cultural significance; Grade I structures are those considered to be "buildings of exceptional interest". Listing was begun by a provision in the Town and Country Planning Act 1947. Once listed, severe restrictions are imposed on the modifications allowed to a building's structure or its fittings. In England, buildings are given listed building status by the Secretary of State for Culture, Media and Sport, acting on the recommendation of Historic England.

More than half of the Grade I buildings in Maidstone are Norman- or medieval-era churches or church related buildings. The greatest concentration of Grade I listed buildings is in central Maidstone, where the Archbishop's Palace, Church of All Saints, the Tithe Barn and the College Gateway form a related group next to the River Medway. Non-religious buildings include Allington Castle and Leeds Castle and manor houses such as the 13th-century Nettlestead Place and 14th-century Otham Manor. Later domestic buildings include 15th-century Chilston Park and 16th-century Boughton Place, both at Boughton Malherbe. The most recent buildings included in the list are the 18th-century West Farleigh Hall and Linton Park.

== Buildings ==
| Name | Location | Type | Completed (Note: The date given is the date used by Historic England as significant for the initial building or that of an important part in the structure's description.) | Date designated | Grid ref. (Note: Sometimes known as OSGB36, the grid reference is based on the British national grid reference system used by the Ordnance Survey.) Geo-coordinates | Notes | Entry number (Note: The "List Entry Number" is a unique number assigned to each listed building and scheduled monument by Historic England.) | Image |
|---|---|---|---|---|---|---|---|---|
| Allington Castle | Allington | Castle | 1299 | 30 July 1951 | TQ7522157907; 51°17′36″N 0°30′42″E | A stone-built moated castle developed from a fortified manor house by Stephen de Penchester. It was converted to a mansion in 1492, but was damaged by fire in the late 16th century and was largely a ruin until restored at the beginning of the 20th century. The stonework is laid in an intricate herringbone pattern. | 1239149 | Allington Castle More images |
| Church of the Holy Cross | Bearsted | Parish Church | 13th century | 23 May 1967 | TQ8011055509; 51°16′13″N 0°34′50″E | A rag-stone church with plain-tiled roofs. The tower is topped by three dogs or bears sejant, a pun on the name of the village. The nave and chancel are flanked by an aisle on the north side. The church contains a memorial bust to 17th-century occultist Robert Fludd. | 1086253 | Church of the Holy Cross More images |
| Boughton Place | Boughton Malherbe | Country House | 1520s | 20 October 1952 | TQ8819449629; 51°12′53″N 0°41′36″E | A country house which is the remaining part of a larger courtyard house, now largely demolished. Some historic internal features remain, but 16th-century timber panelling was remove in the 1920s and taken the United States. The house was home to Sir Henry Wotton and many members of his family. | 1060859 | Boughton Place More images |
| Chilston Park | Boughton Malherbe | Country House | Late 15th or early 16th century | 26 April 1968 | TQ8948750137; 51°13′08″N 0°42′43″E | A country house, originally built around a courtyard, but now forming a single block. The house has been modified many times during its history and externally presents the appearance of an early 18th-century house with sash windows and gabled roofs. The house sits in Grade II listed parkland. | 1060856 | Chilston Park More images |
| Boughton Monchelsea Place and Courtyard Buildings | Boughton Monchelsea | Country House | c. 1567–75 | 25 July 1952 | TQ7716349982; 51°13′17″N 0°32′08″E | A country house comprising the south and east ranges of a former courtyard house, with the north and west ranges demolished and replaced in the early 19th century with stables. The house interior features 16th- and 17th-century fireplaces, timber panelling and staircases. The north range of the stables is topped with a 17th-century clock tower moved from the south range. | 1060787 | Boughton Monchelsea Place and Courtyard Buildings More images |
| Church of St Mary & All Saints | Boxley | Parish Church | 13th century | 26 April 1968 | TQ7749958942; 51°18′07″N 0°32′42″E | A rag-stone church with plain-tiled roofs and battlemented tower. The church features gothic windows and was refurbished in the 1870s. The nave has aisles on both sides and the chancel has a vestry on the south side. | 1185730 | Church of St Mary & All Saints More images |
| Boxley Abbey Barn | Boxley | Abbey | Late 13th century or early 14th century | 20 October 1952 | TQ7602358641; 51°17′59″N 0°31′25″E | A large medieval stone barn 186 feet (57 m) long with a plain-tiled roof. The barn was originally the hospitium of Boxley Abbey, but was later used as a tithe barn and is the Abbey's only significant surviving structure. | 1086229 | Boxley Abbey Barn More images |
| Church of St Martin of Tours | Detling | Parish Church | 1100 | 26 April 1968 | TQ7919658159; 51°17′40″N 0°34′08″E | An early Norman church built of flint and rag-stone with a plain-tiled roof. The two-stage tower is topped by a timber-shingled broach spire added in the 1860s. The nave and chancel are flanked on the north side by an aisle and chapel. The 14th-century lectern probably comes from Boxley Abbey. | 1086225 | Church of St Martin of Tours More images |
| East Farleigh Bridge | East Farleigh | Bridge | 14th century | 26 February 1987 | TQ7348253538; 51°15′17″N 0°29′05″E | A medieval rag-stone bridge of four spans crossing the River Medway. The bridge has been described as "probably the finest medieval bridge in the south of England". | 1249674 | East Farleigh Bridge More images |
| Church of St Peter & St Paul | East Sutton | Parish Church | Mid 13th century or earlier | 26 April 1968 | TQ8279349552; 51°12′57″N 0°36′57″E | A stone church with plain-tiled roof. The nave is flanked by aisles on each side and the chancel has a chapel on each side. The three stage tower and the aisles are topped with battlemented parapets. The roof of the nave and chancel are supported on crown post trusses. | 1060920 | Church of St Peter & St Paul More images |
| Bell Farm House | Harrietsham | Farmhouse | c. 1500 | 20 October 1952 | TQ8713052394; 51°14′24″N 0°40′46″E | A timber-framed farmhouse with a tiled roof and jettied upper storey. The roof is supported on crown post trusses and the staircase is original. | 1086145 | Bell Farm House More images |
| Church of St John the Baptist | Harrietsham | Parish Church | Late 11th century or 12th century | 26 April 1968 | TQ8748553006; 51°14′43″N 0°41′05″E | A rag-stone church with plain-tiled roof. The nave is flanked by aisles on each side and the chancel has a chapel on each side. The tower and aisles have battlemented parapets, the latter with gargoyles at the corners. | 1336289 | Church of St John the Baptist More images |
| Church of St Peter & St Paul | Headcorn | Parish Church | 13th century | 26 April 1968 | TQ8318244204; 51°10′04″N 0°37′08″E | A medieval church built externally and internally of Bethersden Marble. The nave is flanked by an aisle on the south side and the chancel has a south chapel. | 1049057 | Church of St Peter & St Paul More images |
| Church of All Saints | Hollingbourne | Parish Church | 14th century | 26 April 1968 | TQ8433655085; 51°15′54″N 0°38′27″E | A flint and ashlar stone church with plain-tiled roof. The nave is flanked by aisles on each side and the chancel has a chapel on its north side and a vestry on the south side. The tower, north aisle and chapel have battlemented parapets, with the tower's parapet incorporating gargoyles. The vestry contains the Culpeper needlework, a 17th-century embroidery thought to be a funeral pall. | 1203836 | Church of All Saints More images |
| Hollingbourne Manor | Hollingbourne | Manor House | Late 16th century | 20 October 1952 | TQ8436155283; 51°16′01″N 0°38′29″E | An L-shaped red-brick house is the completed southern part of an unfinished E-shaped house. The roofs are pitched with ornamental dormer faces and gable ends and decorative chimneys. The house contains 18th-century panelling on the first floor. | 1203946 | Hollingbourne Manor More images |
| Church of St Mary | Hunton | Parish Church | Late 11th century or 12th century | 23 May 1967 | TQ7241949751; 51°13′15″N 0°28′03″E | A rag-stone church with plain-tiled roof. The nave is adjoined by an aisle on the south side and the chancel has a chapel on its south side and a vestry to its north. The tower is topped by a pyramidal timber-shingled spire. | 1250030 | Church of St Mary More images |
| Church of St Nicholas | Leeds | Parish Church | 11th century | 26 April 1968 | TQ8254153335; 51°15′00″N 0°36′51″E | A rag-stone church with plain-tiled roof. The nave is flanked by aisles on the north and south sides and the chancel has chapels on both of these sides. The tower parapet is battlemented with a short spire added in the 1960s in the style of a 15th-century spire. The nave roof has crown post trusses and the chancel is barrel vaulted. | 1086125 | Church of St Nicholas More images |
| Leeds Castle | Leeds | Castle | Early to mid 12th century | 20 October 1952 | TQ8367353274; 51°14′57″N 0°37′49″E | Possibly started as a motte and bailey castle and a royal residence between 1278 and 1552, the castle stands on two islands in the middle of a lake formed by the River Len. The castle has been modified many times during its history and the Tudor-style buildings were mostly constructed in the 19th century. | 1039919 | Leeds Castle More images |
| Leeds Castle: Ruins of barbicans and dam | Leeds | Gate | Early to mid 13th century | 18 December 1985 | TQ8354153193; 51°14′54″N 0°37′43″E | Ruins of two former barbican towers to the castle with remains of water mill within one. Causeways and bridges now replace the former drawbridges. | 1060933 | Leeds Castle: Ruins of barbicans and dam More images |
| Tithe Barn | Lenham | Barn | Late 14th century | 20 October 1952 | TQ8988452057; 51°14′10″N 0°43′07″E | The remaining one of a pair of tithe barns, the timber-framed and weatherboarded building has a tall hipped roof supported on crown post trusses. | 1116543 | Tithe Barn More images |
| Church of St Mary | Lenham | Parish Church | 12th century | 26 April 1968 | TQ8991752127; 51°14′12″N 0°43′09″E | A rag-stone church with plain-tiled roof. The nave is flanked on the north side by an aisle. The chancel has a chapel and vestry on its north side. The tower parapet is battlemented with gargoyles below. The roofs of the nave, aisle, vestry and chapel are variously formed with scissor-braced trusses, king post trusses, crown post trusses and collar rafters. | 1086103 | Church of St Mary More images |
| Linton Park | Linton | Country House | 1730s | 25 July 1952 | TQ7579749957; 51°13′18″N 0°30′58″E | A large stucco-rendered country house, positioned on a prominent site overlooking the valley of the River Beult. The original house was expanded in the 1820s for James Mann, 5th Earl Cornwallis and features a prominent pedimented portico on the south façade. | 1250171 | Linton Park More images |
| The Archbishop's Palace | Maidstone | Archbishops Palace | 1349–1366 | 30 July 1951 | TQ7592555443; 51°16′15″N 0°31′14″E | Begun by Archbishop of Canterbury John de Ufford and expanded by his successors Archbishops Islip, Courteany and Morton, the riverside palace was a resting place on the journey to London. The house was given by Elizabeth I to Sir John Astley who built much of the current stone and timber-framed structure. | 1336232 | The Archbishop's Palace More images |
| College Gateway | Maidstone | Gatehouse | 1396–1398 | 30 July 1951 | TQ7602155371; 51°16′13″N 0°31′19″E | The gateway to the former College of All Saints, the three-storey structure is built of rag-stone with a hipped roof and vaulted stone arch spanning above its archway. The gateway is one of a group of surviving college buildings. | 1336234 | College Gateway More images |
| Tithe Barn | Maidstone | Barn | 14th century | 30 July 1951 | TQ7603255481; 51°16′17″N 0°31′20″E | A large stone tithe barn with half-timbered porch and plain-tiled hipped roof. The barn was associated with the nearby Archbishop's palace and College of All Saints. | 1336233 | Tithe Barn More images |
| Church of All Saints | Maidstone | Parish Church | 1396–1398 | 30 July 1951 | TQ7599855415; 51°16′15″N 0°31′18″E | Built as the church for the College of All Saints, the building sits between those of the College and the Archbishop's Palace. Following the Dissolution, the church became the parish church for Maidstone. The battlemented tower formerly had a spire, which was destroyed in 1730. | 1225056 | Church of All Saints More images |
| Church of St Michael & All Angels | Marden | Parish Church | c. 1200 | 23 May 1967 | TQ7442344643; 51°10′28″N 0°29′38″E | The church is constructed variously of coursed and random sandstone, rag-stone and puddingstone with plain-tiled and lead roofs. The nave is flanked on each side by aisles and the chancel has chapels each side. The stone tower is topped by a later weatherboarded belfry. The roofs of the chancel, nave and the chapels are of crown post trusses. | 1054804 | Church of St Michael & All Angels More images |
| Church of St Mary | Nettlestead | Parish Church | 13th century | 23 May 1967 | TQ6850752124; 51°14′36″N 0°24′46″E | A small parish church without aisles or chapels, the rag-stone building has plain-tiled roofs to the nave and chancel and a pyramidal timber roof to the tower. The north and south walls of the nave each contain three large traceried windows and are heavily buttressed. | 1060645 | Church of St Mary More images |
| Nettlestead Place | Nettlestead | House | c. 1250–60 | 23 May 1967 | TQ6853352044; 51°14′34″N 0°24′47″E | A country house built of rag-stone with gabled plain-tiled roofs. The house was used for two centuries as an oast house before being restored and extended for use as a home in the 1920s. | 1344436 | Nettlestead Place More images |
| Nettlestead Place: The Gatehouse | Nettlestead | Gatehouse | Early 14th century | 25 July 1952 | TQ6843552066; 51°14′34″N 0°24′42″E | A two-storey gatehouse with rag-stone ground floor and half-timbered first floor which is jettied across the roadway on bressumer beams. | 1060648 | Upload Photo |
| Church of St Nicholas | Otham | Parish Church | Late 12th century | 23 May 1967 | TQ7891754081; 51°15′28″N 0°33′46″E | The church is constructed of uncoursed stone with a steeply pitched plain-tiled roof. The tower is positioned in the centre of the south wall at the junction of the nave and chancel and is topped by a timber hipped roof and octagonal spire. Adjacent chapels adjoin the north side of the nave and chancel. The nave roof features crown post trusses. | 1250738 | Church of St Nicholas More images |
| Otham Manor | Otham | House | Late 14th century | 25 July 1952 | TQ7974753504; 51°15′08″N 0°34′27″E | A timber-framed medieval hall house with a king post roof structure and jettied bays at each end of the north wing. | 1250941 | Otham Manor More images |
| Synyards and path between front door and road | Otham | House | Late 15th century | 25 July 1952 | TQ7973453120; 51°14′56″N 0°34′26″E | A timber-framed medieval hall house. Jettied bays extend from each end of the west façade. Walls on the ground floor have 16th-century timber panelling and a room on the first floor features a wall paintings of mermen, mermaids, lions and dragons. | 1263084 | Upload Photo |
| Church of All Saints | Staplehurst | Parish Church | Late 12th century | 23 May 1967 | TQ7863342981; 51°09′30″N 0°33′11″E | A sandstone and rag-stone church with plain-tiled roof. The nave is flanked by an aisle on the south side and the chancel has a chapel to its south. The nave has a barrel roof and the aisle has crown post trusses. Those of the chancel and chapel are wagon roofs. | 1060713 | Church of All Saints More images |
| Church of St Mary Magdalene | Stockbury | Parish Church | Late 12th century | 26 April 1968 | TQ8468561676; 51°19′27″N 0°38′57″E | A flint church with stone dressings with a plain-tiled rood. The tower has a battlemented parapet with gargoyles. The nave has aisle on each side and the junction with the chancel is flanked by transepts to the north and south. The nave and south transept have crown post trussed roofs. | 1086193 | Church of St Mary Magdalene More images |
| Teston Bridge | Teston/West Farleigh | Bridge | 14th or 15th century | 26 February 1987 | TQ7088153269; 51°15′11″N 0°26′50″E | A medieval rag-stone bridge of six spans, three of which cross over the River Medway. | 1262983 | Teston Bridge More images |
| Milgate House | Thurnham | House | Mid to late 16th century | 26 April 1968 | TQ8078454720; 51°15′46″N 0°35′23″E | A country house extended at a number of points in its history, the older parts of the house are concealed by an early 18th-century addition built in red brick with a pedimented central bay. Behind the Georgian wing, the older parts of the house surround a central courtyard. | 1086203 | Upload Photo |
| Church of St Mary the Virgin | Thurnham | Parish Church | 12th century | 26 April 1968 | TQ8040957642; 51°17′21″N 0°35′09″E | A small parish church of continuous nave and chancel without aisles. A chapel is attached to the north side of the nave. The church is constructed mostly of flint with a plain-tiled roof. The short tower has a battlemented parapet and once had a steeple, but this is now absent. | 1086165 | Church of St Mary the Virgin More images |
| Church of All Saints | Ulcombe | Collegiate Church | 12th century | 26 April 1968 | TQ8465949767; 51°13′02″N 0°38′34″E | A stone church with plain-tiled roofs. The nave has an aisle on the south side. Chapels are located on the north side of the nave and on the north and south sides of the chancel. The tower has a battlemented parapet with gargoyles. The churchyard contains several ancient yew trees, one of which is said to be more than 2000 years old. | 1060850 | Church of All Saints More images |
| Church of All Saints | West Farleigh | Parish Church | Late 11th century or 12th century | 23 May 1967 | TQ7155853501; 51°15′18″N 0°27′26″E | A small parish church of rag-stone with areas of pebbledash render to the nave and chancel. There are no aisles or chapels. The roof is of plain rafters and the battlemented tower has gargoyles. | 1060613 | Church of All Saints More images |
| West Farleigh Hall | West Farleigh | Country House | 1719 | 27 July 1952 | TQ7133252611; 51°14′49″N 0°27′12″E | A Georgian country house with a brick-built main façade of nine bays. The façade comprises two tones of red brick with the darker tone used in piers to divide the façade into three sections and in panels between the ground and first floor windows. | 1116033 | West Farleigh Hall More images |
| Church of St Peter and St Paul | Yalding | Parish Church | 13th century | 23 May 1967 | TQ6984650069; 51°13′29″N 0°25′51″E | A cruciform-plan church built mostly of rag-stone and sandstone. The roofs are of slate, plain tile and lead. The nave is flanked by aisles on both sides, with a north and south transept separating it from the chancel. The stair turret to the corner of the tower is topped by a lead covered onion dome. The chancel roof is of crown post trusses; the remainder are boarded. | 1145919 | Church of St Peter and St Paul More images |

== See also ==
- Grade I listed buildings in Kent
- Grade II* listed buildings in Maidstone
- Scheduled monuments in Maidstone
