= St Mary's and All Saints Church, Boxley =

Coordinates: 51.301925°N 0.544854°E

St Mary's and All Saints Church
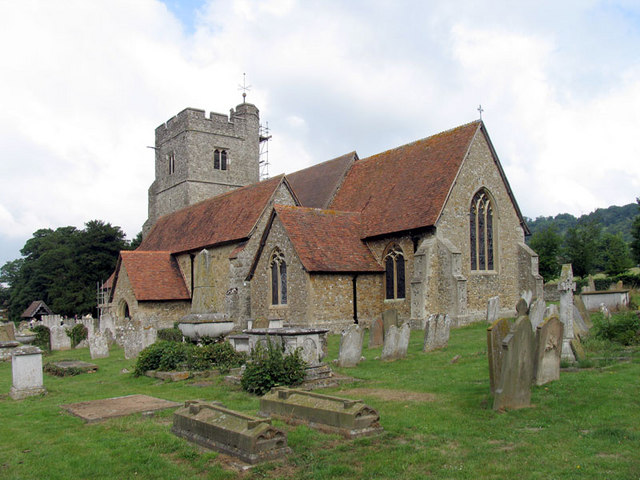
- Church from the south-east

- Location within Kent
- OS grid reference: TQ 77499 58942
- Location: Boxley, Kent
- Country: England
- Denomination: Anglican
- Website: Boxley Church

History
- Status: Parish church

Architecture
- Functional status: Active
- Heritage designation: Grade I
- Designated: 26 April 1968
- Style: Decorated Gothic/ Perpendicular Gothic
- Completed: 13th, 14th and 15th centuries

Specifications
- Materials: Rag-stone, Flint

Administration
- Province: Canterbury
- Diocese: Canterbury
- Archdeaconry: Maidstone
- Deanery: North Downs
- Parish: St Mary's and All Saints, Boxley

St Mary's and All Saints is a parish church in Boxley, Kent begun in the 13th century and with additions in the 14th and 15th centuries. The church was restored in the 1870s. It is a Grade I listed building.

== Building ==
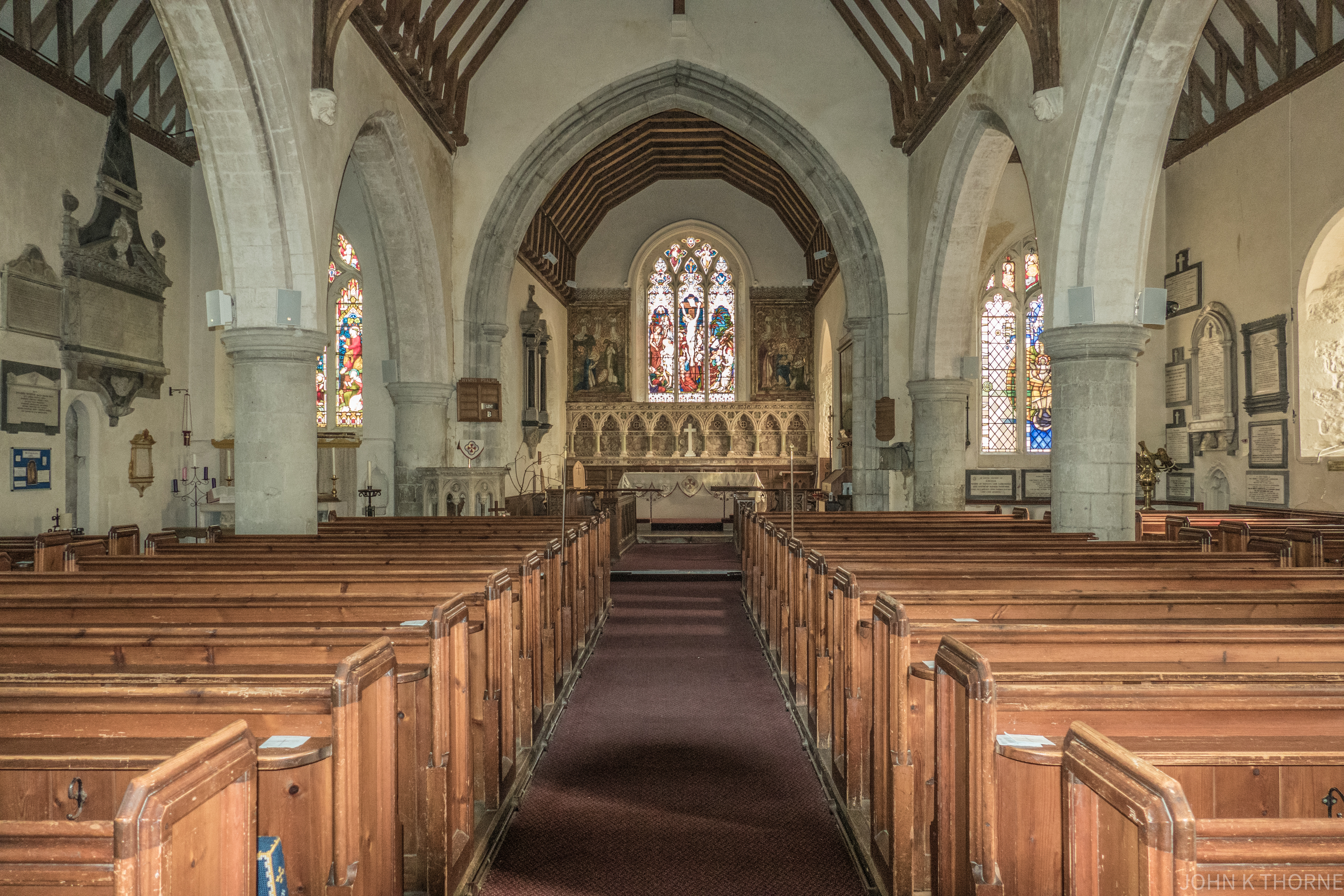
The nave, looking towards the chancel and the east end

=== Structure ===
The church is constructed with uncoursed local rag-stone and flint walls and plain tiled roofs. The nave is flanked by aisles on each side and the chancel has a vestry on the south side. The tower at the west end of the nave has a narthex on its west side, being the remains of an earlier church.

The tower is formed in three stages with buttressed corners and a battlemented parapet. A stair turret is attached to the north-east corner and belfry windows are located on the top floor on each side. The narthex has a half-hipped roof with a restored three-lighted perpendicular gothic window set left of centre on the west face above the entrance door. Smaller two-lighted windows are positioned at low level in the north and south walls.

The north and south aisles feature variously sized and detailed two-lighted decorated gothic windows on their flank and end walls. The centre bay of the south aisle is occupied by the south porch. The windows in the chancel and the vestry on its south side are 19th-century.

=== Interior ===
The interior of the narthex features remains of Norman arcading and a common rafter roof. The doorways through the east and west walls of the tower are perpendicular with the one on the west having carvings of a bishop and a king in the moulding over.

The north and south sides of the nave are divided from the aisles on each side with early 13th-century arcades of three bays on short circular piers. The chancel arch is early perpendicular. The roofs of the nave is early 15th-century with moulded crown post trusses. The scissor braced roofs to the aisles are 13th-century. The chancel roof is thought to be 19th-century. The east ends of each aisle contain a piscina. The font is 19th-century on an early 15th-century base.

=== Bells ===
There is a ring of six bells (tenor 10 long cwt 3 qr 10 lb; 1,214 lb or 551 kg in F sharp) hung in the English style for full circle ringing.

== Notable people ==
James Craigie Robertson was curate here in the 1840s before he went on to be religious historian and a canon at Canterbury Cathedral. His daughter Emily Innes was born here in 1846.

== Memorials and monuments ==
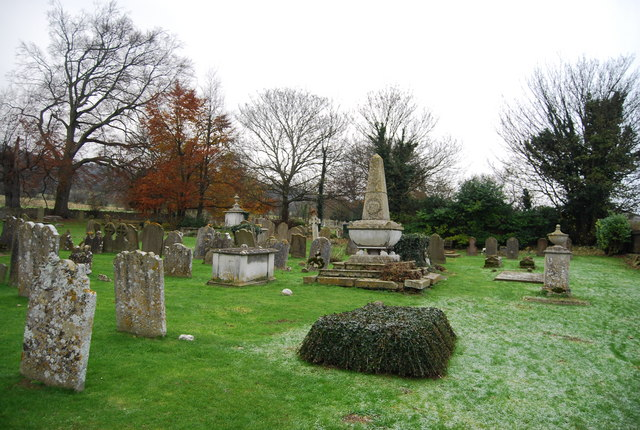
Part of churchyard, with monument to the Dunning family in centre (obelisk).

The church contains memorials to Sir Henry Wiat of Allington Castle (d. 1537, erected 1702), Richard Tomynn (d. 1576), George and Elizabeth Charlton (d. 1707 and d. 1750), Hannah Champneys (d. 1748), William Champneys (d. 1760) and Frances Champneys (d. 1800).

The lychgate constructed in 1875 is listed separately as a Grade II listed structure. The churchyard contains a large number of Grade II listed monuments and headstones.

== See also ==
- Boxley Abbey
- Boxley Abbey Barn
- Grade I listed buildings in Maidstone
