= Smiths Hall =

Country house in West Farleigh, Kent, England

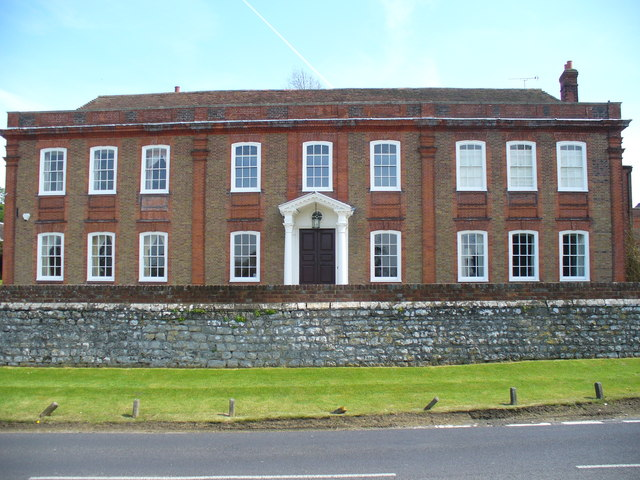
- West façade of Smiths Hall

- Location within Kent

General information
- Location: West Farleigh, England
- Coordinates: 51.246938°N 0.453444°E
- Completed: 1719

Smiths Hall, known as West Farleigh Hall from the early 20th century until the 1990s, is an 18th-century country house in West Farleigh, Kent.

== History ==
A house on the site of Smiths Hall was owned by the Brewer family from the mid-15th century until 1762 when the house and estate was left by Jane Brewer to her cousin Rev. John Davis, Rector of Hamsey, East Sussex. Davis died in 1766 and the estate passed to his son Sir John Davis who sold it in 1774 to William Perrin. Perrin died in 1820. By 1838, the house was owned by Sir Henry FitzHerbert, son of Sir William FitzHerbert and his wife Sarah FitzHerbert (née Perrin, and probably William Perrin's niece). Around 1921, Henry Arthur Hannen son of the Baron Hannen was living in the hall.

== Buildings ==
The current house was constructed in 1719 as recorded in the dated rainwater hoppers. It is two-storeys and brick-built with a plain tile roof. The main façade on the west side is nine bays wide arranged symmetrically around a central doorway. The pale red brick façade is divided by projecting brick pilasters of darker red rubbed bricks into three equal sized sections. The first floor has nine sash windows of twelve panes with curved tops - three in each section. the ground floor window arrangement repeats that of the first floor except that the central doorway replaces the central window. The windows on both floors are framed in dark red rubbed bricks with the central voussoir brick enlarged to appear as a keystone. Recessed panels of brickwork are placed beneath the windows on each floor. The dark red brick detailing continues up the façade past the cornice into the brick parapet. The central doorway is a pair of doors in a later 18th century porch with a modillioned open pediment. The doors are larger than the opening with the upper panels concealed behind a lowered lintel.

The north and south side façades follow the pattern of the west façade but in red and grey brickwork, with pilasters at each side and the panelled parapet. The north façade is five bays wide with twelve pane sash windows on each floor constructed from a galletted ragstone plinth. The south façade has a brick plinth and the windows here are less regular with blocked windows on the west side at both levels and smaller six pane windows. A projecting bay fills the centre of the façade. The rear façade is divided by a central wing projecting eastwards which turns to the south to form the north and east sides of a courtyard. The rear of the main block has a cornice and two six pane windows. The central wing and its returns have six pane windows on the south side and twelve pane windows on the north side.

Internally, the house has a two-storey timber panelled entrance hall with a balustraded timber gallery along the wall opposite the door supported by a large fluted Corinthian column. Steps lead up from each end of the gallery to the first floor. The gallery bridges the main stairs which extends into the central wing. Rooms on the ground floor and first floor off of the hallway feature 17th and 18th century panelling. A room to the rear of the ground floor has 18th century library shelving.

The house is a Grade I listed building. A separate 18th century red and grey brick house in the garden that was formerly the coach house is listed Grade II as is the wall around the grounds.

== See also ==
- Grade I listed buildings in Maidstone
