= St John the Baptist's Church, Harrietsham =

Coordinates: 51.24541°N 0.684828°E

St John the Baptist's church
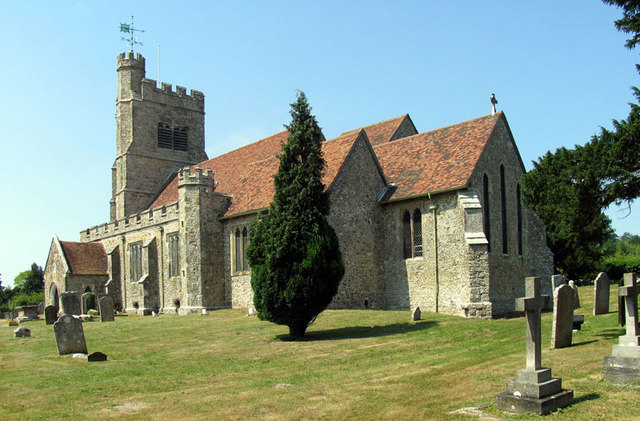

- Location within Kent
- OS grid reference: TQ 87485 53006
- Location: Harrietsham, Kent
- Country: England
- Denomination: Anglican

History
- Status: Parish church

Architecture
- Functional status: Active
- Heritage designation: Grade I
- Designated: 26 April 1968

Administration
- Province: Canterbury
- Diocese: Canterbury
- Archdeaconry: Maidstone
- Deanery: North Downs

St John the Baptist's Church is a parish church in Marley Road, Harrietsham, Kent dedicated to John the Baptist. It was begun in the late 11th century or in the 12th century and works continued to the 15th century. The church is a Grade I listed building.

== Building ==
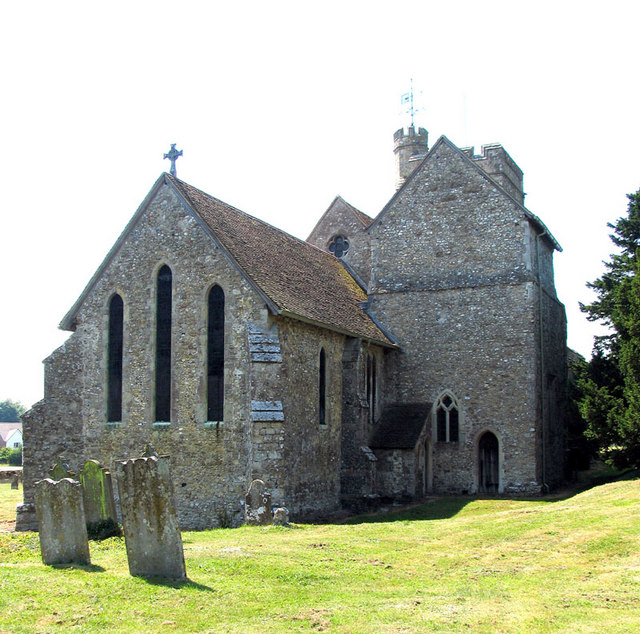
The east end from the east.

Construction of the church was begun in the late 11th century or in the 12th century and continued in phases until the 15th century. The church is constructed mostly of local rag-stone and has plain tiled roofs.

The late 15th-century west tower comprises three stages with diagonal buttresses on the external corners and a taller attached stair turret on the south-east corner. String courses separate each stage and a battlemented parapet forms the top of the walls on each side and the top of the stair tower. The west side contains a three-lighted traceried window in the first stage positioned above the small west door. The second stage contains small lancet windows on the three outward-facing façades and the third stage contains two-lighted belfry windows on each side.

The 14th-century nave is flanked on each side by aisles added in the 15th century. The external walls of both the aisles are rag-stone and flint with pieces of tufa. Both aisles feature a moulded string course below a battlemented parapet with corner gargoyles. Each aisle contains two 15th-century three-lighted arched windows in the long side and a window in the west end, each with hood moulds. Towards the west end of the south aisle is the south porch with three-centred arched internal and external doorways and a crown post roof. On the east corner of the south aisle is a polygonal rood stair turret with a battlemented top.

The chancel is 13th century or earlier with a 14th-century chapel on the south side and a late 11th or early 12th-century chapel on the north side. The external walls are buttressed and are of knapped or uncut flint with the chapel and tower walls also including pieces of tufa. The north chapel is converted from the lower two storeys of a tower, and has small windows on the east and north side with a 19th-century arched door on the east side. On the north-west corner of the north chapel is a stair turret to the upper floor. The south chapel has a three-lighted window on the south side. The east end of the chancel contains three tall lancet windows with the centre taller than the sides. The south wall contains a two-lighted window and the north wall a single lancet window and 15th-century window. The aisles have shallow lean-to roofs; the chapels are gabled.

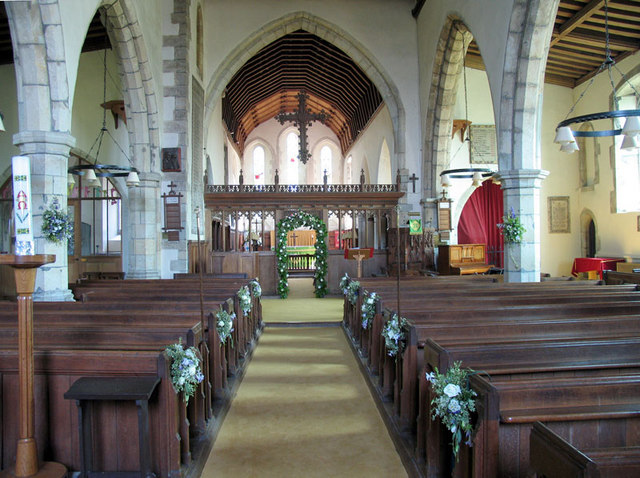
Interior of nave looking towards the chancel.

Internally, the aisles are divided from the nave with arcades of three pointed arches with octagonal columns and moulded capitals and bases; the arcade to the south is early 14th century and the one to the north late 14th century. The arcade on the south side continues between the chancel and the south chapel, with a single arch on the north side between the chancel and north chapel. The nave and flanking aisles are connected to the adjacent chancel and chapels with 14th-century arches. The north chapel has a 13th-century quadripartite vaulted on the ground floor with thick chamfered ribs springing from slender attached columns in the corners. The nave roof is restored 15th-century with crown posts and the aisle roofs feature moulded purlins. The chancel and south aisle roofs are 19th century.

The carved marble font is late 12th century with possible restoration and has been described as "one of the finest Norman fonts in the country". The south wall of the chancel and the east wall of the north chapel contain piscina and the east wall of the chancel contains aumbries. A 15th-century traceried screen between the nave and chancel was restored and extended in the late 19th century. The chancel floor is made-up of patterned encaustic tiles.

== Monuments and memorials ==
The church contains a number of monuments, including memorial brasses in the floor of the chancel, the table tomb of William Stede (d. 1574), wall memorials to Sir Edwyn Stede, Lieutenant Governor of Barbados (d. 1695), Constance Stede (d. 1714), Charlotte Baldwin (d. 1788) and William Baldwin (d. 1839).

The churchyard contains a number of Grade II listed table tombs and headstones.

== See also ==
- Grade I listed buildings in Maidstone
