= All Saints Church, West Farleigh =

Coordinates: 51.254866°N 0.457105°E

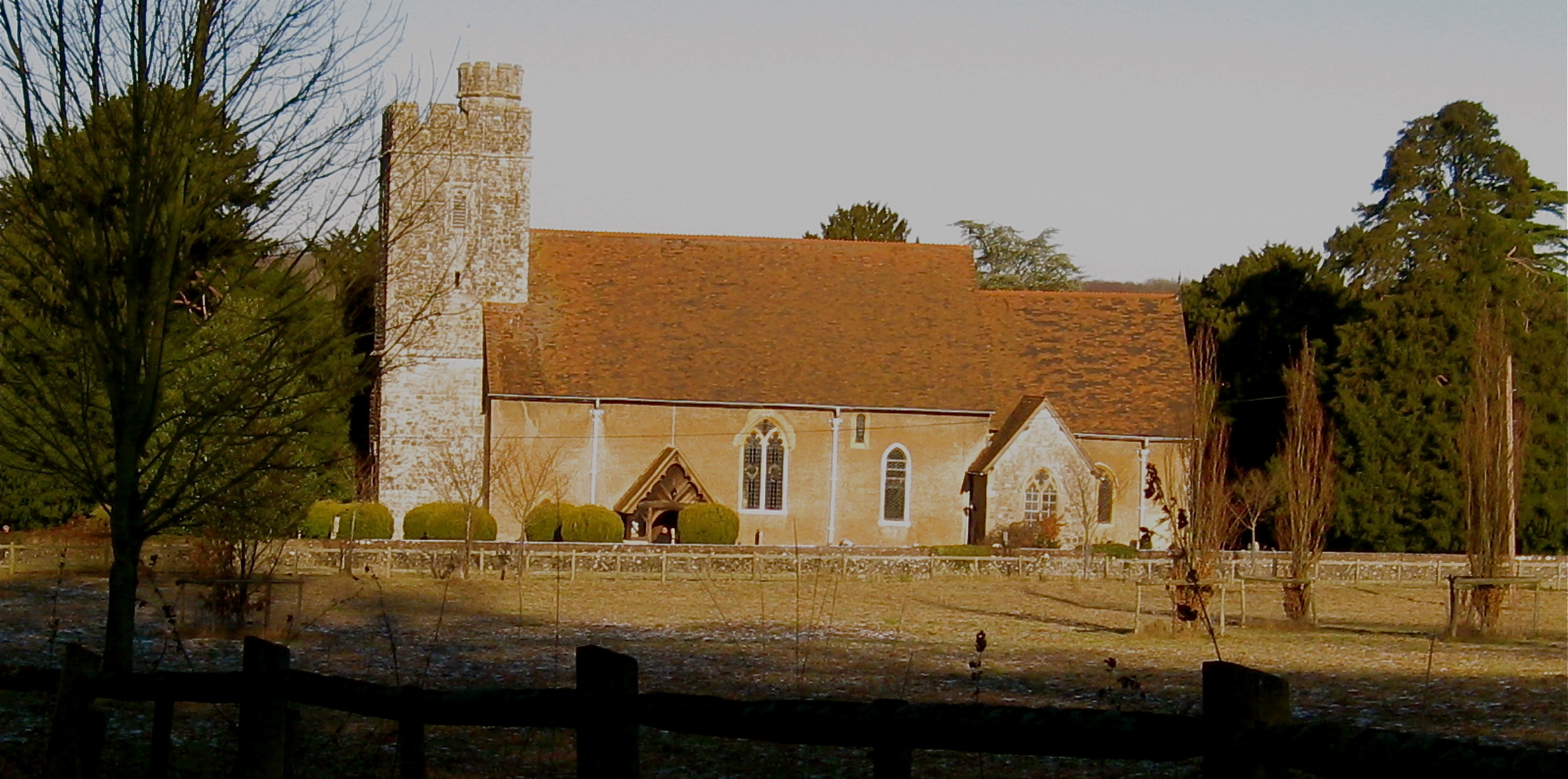

- Location within Kent
- OS grid reference: TQ 71558 53501
- Location: West Farleigh, Kent
- Country: England
- Denomination: Anglican

History
- Status: Parish church

Architecture
- Functional status: Active
- Heritage designation: Grade I
- Designated: 23 May 1967
- Completed: Late 11th or 12th century, 15th and 19th centuries

Administration
- Province: Canterbury
- Diocese: Rochester
- Archdeaconry: Tonbridge
- Deanery: Malling

All Saints is a parish church in West Farleigh, Kent. It was begun in the 11th century and is a Grade I listed building.

== Building ==
The church was begun in the late 11th century or the 12th century with further work carried out in the 15th century. The church was restored in 1875 and is constructed of roughly coursed or uncoursed rag-stone with pebbledashed render to the nave and chancel. The roofs are plain tiled. It is a Grade I listed building.

The nave and chancel are the oldest parts of the church. The north side of the nave has two 15th-century two-lighted windows and a small window below the eaves. The south side has a wide lancet window at the east end and a larger 19th century two-lighted traceried in the middle of the façade. Attached to the south side of the nave is a glazed timber porch with a pitched roof added in the 19th century. The inner doorway to the nave is 15th century. The chancel has two-lighted traceried windows to the north and south and three small round-headed windows in the east wall. Attached to the south side is a 19th-century organ chamber. The 15th century west tower is in two stages on a stone plinth with a battlemented parapet above a moulded string. The three outward facing sides contain a single trefoil-headed belfry opening. A taller stair turret, with battlements and gargoyles, is attached to the north-east corner.

Internally, the arches between nave and chancel and between nave and tower are round-headed and rest on tufa columns. The nave and chancel roofs are of common rafters with three moulded and braced tie beams to the nave and plain and unbraced tie beam to the chancel. Piscina are located in the south-east corner of the nave and the below the south window of the chancel. The 17th-century font is octagonal and made of Bethersden marble. An 18th century pew contains a frieze of pierced panels.

The church contains memorials to Edward Lawrence (d. 1605), Augustine Skynner (d. 1672), Jane Brewer (d. 1676), Jane Brewer (d. 1716), Edward Goulstone (d. 1720), Elizabeth Kirby (d. 1748) and John Davis (d. 1776). The churchyard contains a number of Grade II listed monuments.

== See also ==
- Grade I listed buildings in Maidstone
