= St Michael and All Angels Church, Marden =

Coordinates: 51.174423°N 0.493815°E

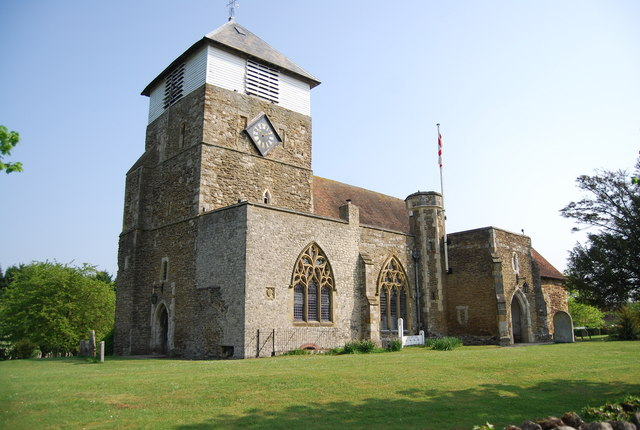

- Location within Kent
- OS grid reference: TQ 74423 44643
- Location: Marden, Kent
- Country: England
- Denomination: Anglican
- Website: http://www.mardenchurch.org.uk/

History
- Status: Parish church

Architecture
- Functional status: Active
- Heritage designation: Grade I
- Designated: 23 May 1967
- Completed: Circa 1200, 13th, 14th, 15th, 16th, 19th and 20th centuries

Administration
- Province: Canterbury
- Diocese: Canterbury
- Archdeaconry: Maidstone
- Deanery: The Weald

St Michael and All Angels Church is a parish church in Marden, Kent. It was begun circa 1200 and is a Grade I listed building.

== Building ==
The church was begun around 1200 and was altered or extended in the 13th, 14th, 15th and 16th centuries and was restored in 1868 and 1909. The church is constructed variously of coursed and random sandstone, rag-stone and puddingstone and has plain tiled and lead roofs.

The nave is adjoined by aisles on the north and south sides, the one to the south continuing across the south face of the west tower. The chancel has chapels on the north and south side. The tower was built in the 13th or early 14th century and comprises three stone-built stages with a fourth stage, containing the belfry added later in white painted weatherboarding with a pyramidal roof. Louvred openings occupy the centre of each side of the belfry. Small rectangular or pointed lancet windows pierce the stonework on each external face of the lower stages, except the south face which abuts the south aisle. A square stair turret with window slits adjoins the north-west corner of the tower.

Both aisles are early 14th century. The south aisle has a rag-stone plinth, but the north aisle is plinthless. The south aisle has two buttresses with three large three-lighted 14th-century style arched windows; two to the west of the porch and one to the east. The western bay, attached to the south side of the tower was reconstructed in the 19th or early 20th century. The north aisle has a diagonal buttress on the north-west corner and two on the north side positioned between the three three-lighted windows. Two are original 14th-century and the third is 19th-century in the same style with traceried decoration. The west end of the north aisle contains a 19th-century two-lighted window. The west end of the south aisle is blank apart from a small blocked lancet window.

The early 14th century south porch occupies the secondmost eastern bay of the south aisle. Diagonal buttresses project from the outer corners. The inner and outer doorways are pointed arches and an octagonal stair turret to the parvis chamber is positioned in the angle at the north-west corner between the porch and the south aisle.

The chancel was built about 1200 and restored in 1868. It has no plinths or buttresses. The eastern end of the north and south walls each contain a single pointed arch window. The 19th century east window is three-lighted. The south chapel is 14th century as was partly rebuilt after a fire in 1554. The two-light window in the south wall and the three-light window in the east wall are both 19th century. The north chapel is 15th century with two two-light windows on the north side and a three-light window in the east end. All date from the 15th century with cinquefoil heads and tracery.

Internally, the nave is separated from the aisles with 14th-century arcades of three bays of pointed arches: octagonal columns in the south arcade and alternating circular and octagonal columns in the north arcade. The chancel arch is circa 1200 and the tower arch is 13th or early 14th century. The chapels are divided from the chancel with two bay arcades of pointed arches, each contemporary with the age of the adjacent chapel. The roofs of the chancel, nave and the chapels are of crown post construction with the ridge of the roofs of the chancel and chapels being lower than the nave. The aisle roofs are lean-tos.

The font is octagonal and carved with initials and date "EM 1662". The octagonal wooden font cover with a central finial has hinged panels on four sides. Doorways to the parvis stairs and rood loft stairs are in the south wall of the south aisle and the south wall of the north aisle respectively. The three chancel windows contain stained glass by Patrick Reyntiens installed in 1962. The church contains memorials to Edward Cole (d. 1757) and George Maplesden (d. 1688).

The church is set in a large churchyard dotted with headstones. Close to the south aisle are Grade II listed stocks capable of holding two people.

== See also ==
- Grade I listed buildings in Maidstone
