= St Mary's Church, Hunton =

Coordinates: 51.220918°N 0.467627°E

St Mary's church, Hunton
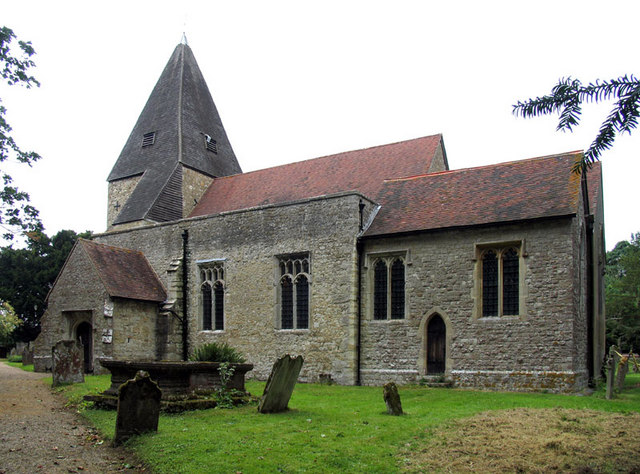

- Location within Kent
- OS grid reference: TQ 72419 49751
- Location: Hunton, Kent
- Country: England
- Denomination: Anglican

History
- Status: Parish church

Architecture
- Functional status: Active
- Heritage designation: Grade I
- Designated: 23 May 1967
- Completed: Late 11th or 12th century; 13th, 14th, 15th, 16th and 19th centuries

Administration
- Province: Canterbury
- Diocese: Rochester
- Archdeaconry: Tonbridge
- Deanery: Malling

St Mary's Church is a parish church in Hunton, Kent, England. It was begun in the late 11th or the 12th century and is a Grade I listed building.

== Building ==
The church was begun in the late 11th century or in the 12th century and was altered and extended in the 13th, 14th, 15th, 16th and 19th centuries. The church is constructed of uncoursed rag-stone rubble and has plain tiled roofs. It was restored in 1876 by Ewan Christian.

The nave is adjoined by an aisle on the south side and the chancel has a chapel on its south side and a vestry to its north. The west tower is 13th century and comprises three stages divided by ashlared stone bands. The outer facing corners have diagonal buttresses. Single lancet windows punctuate the north, south and west sides of the second and third stages. The spire is pyramidal with wood shingle covering, which also covers the lean-to roof of the stair turret on the south-east side of the tower.

The south aisle is 15th century. The rubble wall has a single buttress adjacent to the south porch on the west end and a plain parapet. A pair of two-lighted rectangular windows are on the south side and a two-lighted pointed arch window is in the west end. The porch is diagonally buttressed on the outer corners with a gabled roof. The south chapel was rebuilt or refaced in 1866 in with two-lighted rectangular windows in 15th century style. The north wall of the nave is from the late 11th century or from the 12th century with quoins of tufa stone. Two two-lighted windows traceried with quatrefoil and sexfoil decoration are late 13th century or early 14th century. A 15th-century three-lighted window is located in the centre of the north façade. The chancel is mostly 13th century with elements contemporaneous with the nave. The three-lighted east window is 19th century, but in 15th century style. The north façade contains a broad lancet window. The vestry was probably added in 1866 and has two lancet windows on the north side and a doorway on the west.

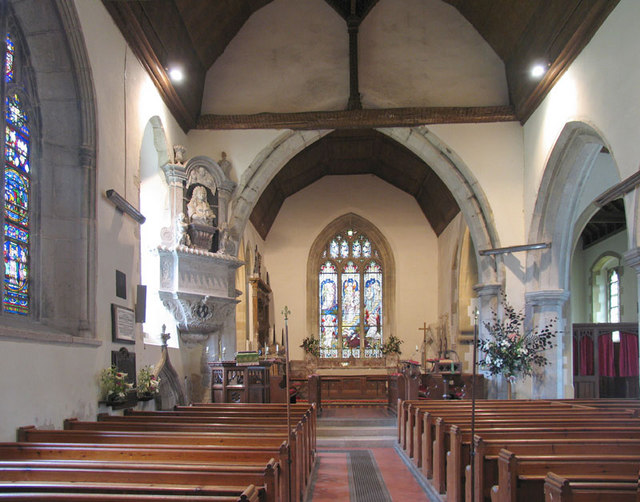
Interior looking east from the nave to the chancel

Internally, the nave is separated from the aisle with a 15th-century arcade of three bays of pointed arches with octagonal columns. The tower and chancel arches are 13th century and 14th century respectively. The arches from the chancel to the vestry and chapel and between the aisle and chapel are all 19th century. The nave has a crown post roof with moulded posts and chamfered tie beams. The chancel roof is boarded and the roof to the chapel is scissor braced.

The south wall of the chancel contains a Bethersden Marble 13th century double sedile at its east end with a piscina in the south-east corner. The font is octagonal with traceried panels.

The Church of St Mary was Listed (Grade I, English Heritage Legacy ID: 432265) on 23 May 1967. The history provided in that document includes this background information: "Parish church. Late C11 or C12, C13, C14, C15, C16, and 1866. Restored 1876 by Ewan Christian. Uncoursed ragstone rubble with plain tile roof. West tower, nave, south aisle, south porch, chancel with south chapel and north vestry". A marble tablet on the nave wall is dedicated to Sir Henry Campbell-Bannerman who maintained a country estate nearby (now called Hunton Court); he died in 1908.

== Monuments and memorials ==
The church contains a number of monuments to local families including Sir Thomas Fane MP and his wife (both d. 1606), Francis Fane (d. 1651?), Lady Anne Fane (d. 1663), Sir Thomas Fane MP (d. 1692), Henry Hatley (d. 1716), Thomas Turner (d. 1776), Thomas Durant Punnett (d. 1785) and Sir Henry Campbell-Bannerman (d. 1908, Prime Minister 1905–1908 and owner of nearby Hunton Court).

The churchyard contains a number of Grade II listed tombs and headstones including those of James Allen (d. 1682), Paul Beeston (d. 1694), Richard Beeston (d. 1691), Ann Bishop (d. 1653), James Bishop (d. 165(2)?), Mary Bisset (d. 1698), William Bisset (d. 1714), Henry Catlet (d. 1700), Samuel Hovenden (d. 165(3)?), Thomas Newman (d. 1710), and Mary Snatt (d. 1666). Several others, without identifiable inscriptions, are also listed.

== See also ==
- Grade I listed buildings in Maidstone
