= St Nicholas Church, Leeds =

Anglican church in Kent, England

Coordinates: 51.249967°N 0.61424°E

St Nicholas Church
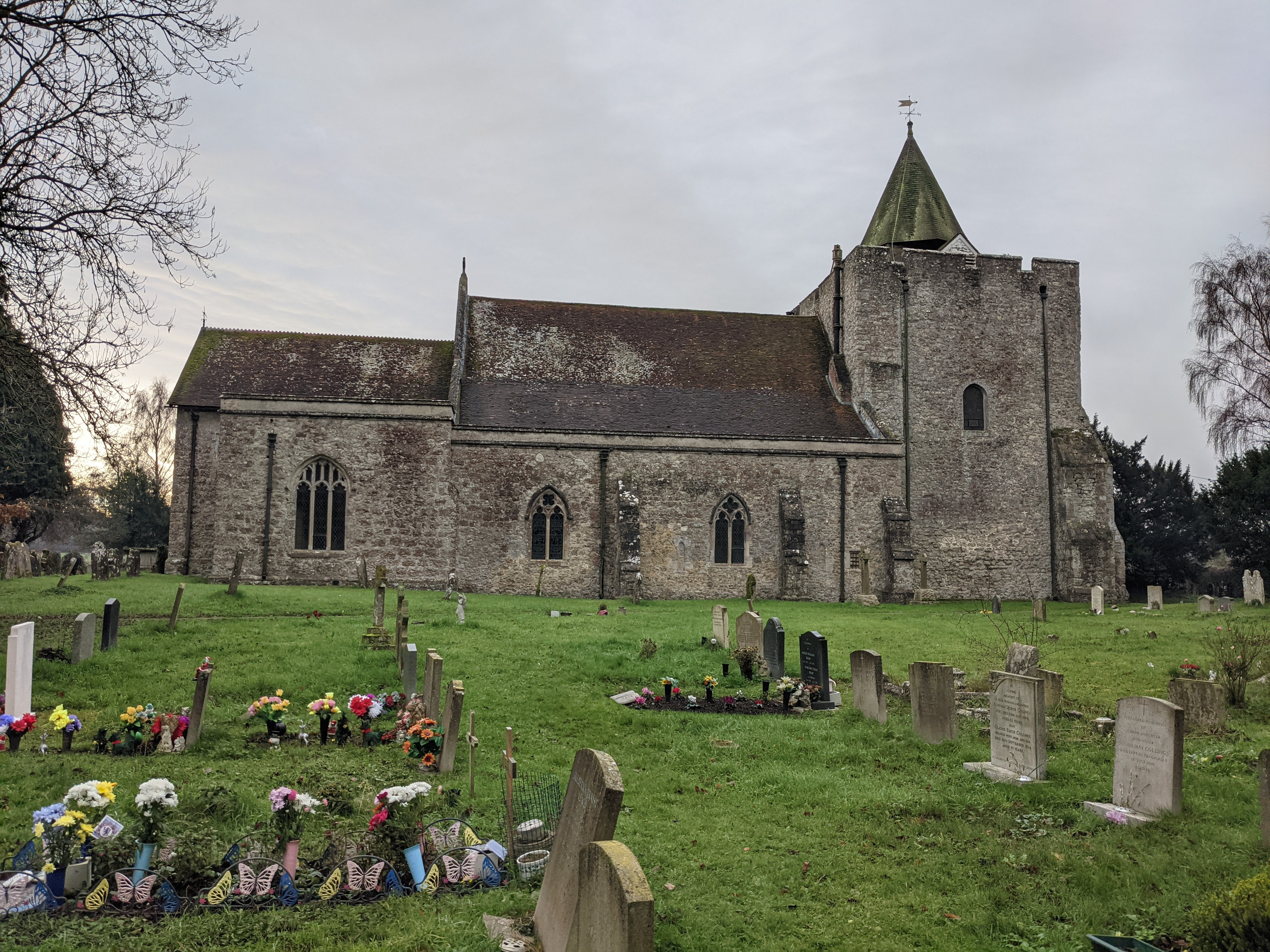
- North side of church

- Location within Kent
- OS grid reference: TQ 82541 53335
- Location: Leeds, Kent
- Country: England
- Denomination: Anglican
- Website: http://www.leedskent.org.uk/church.htm

History
- Status: Parish church

Architecture
- Functional status: Active
- Heritage designation: Grade I
- Designated: 26 April 1968
- Completed: 11th, 12th, 13th, 14th, 15th and 16th centuries

Administration
- Province: Canterbury
- Diocese: Canterbury
- Archdeaconry: Maidstone
- Deanery: North Downs
- Parish: St Nicholas, Leeds

St Nicholas is a Church of England parish church in Leeds, Kent first built in the 11th century with additions in the next five centuries. It is a Grade I listed building.

== Building ==
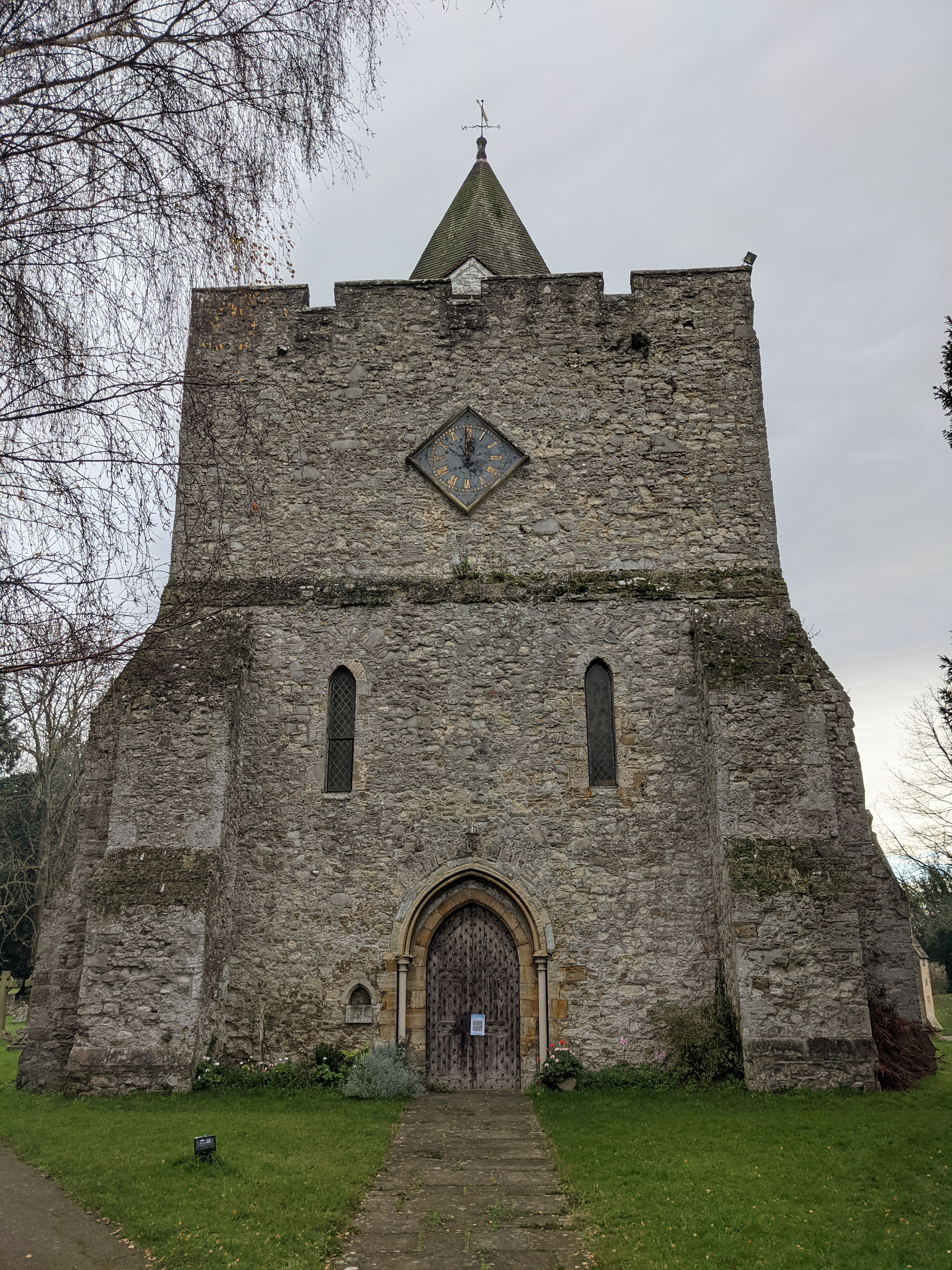
The west side of the church tower

Construction of the church began in the 11th century; it is built of a mix of local ragstone and tufa with a roof covered in plain clay tiles. The large square tower on the west end is of two levels with broad buttresses and quoined corners of tufa. The north and south sides of the tower have windows with semi-circular heads and the west side has two lancet windows and a pointed arched door. The roof level has a battlemented parapet with a timber spire built in 1963 in the style of an earlier 15th-century spire. The church clock was built in the 1730s and the tower contains a ring of ten bells; nine dating from the 1750s with the tenor bell cast in 1617.

The main body of the church is constructed of ragstone with tufa inclusions and has clay-tiled roofs. The nave is flanked by aisles on the north and south sides and the chancel has chapels on both of these sides. On the north side, the aisle is 12th-century with a cornice and parapet, three buttresses and two large two-lighted quatrefoiled windows. The northern chapel is 15th-century with the cornice and parapet continued from the aisle and a three-lighted window.

The south aisle was possibly built in the 12th century, but is mostly 14th-century with later modifications. It has a cornice and parapet similar to the north side of the church and prominent buttresses flanking a pair of 19th-century three-lighted windows in 14th-century style. At the west end of the south aisle is a 19th-century gabled porch in 13th-century style, containing a pointed arch doorway with small window above. The south chapel is also 14th-century with 15th-century windows, the one on the south side being three-lighted above a later rectangular door. The chancel was possibly reconstructed in the 16th century and has narrow round-topped windows at the east end of the north and south walls. The main east window is cuspless.

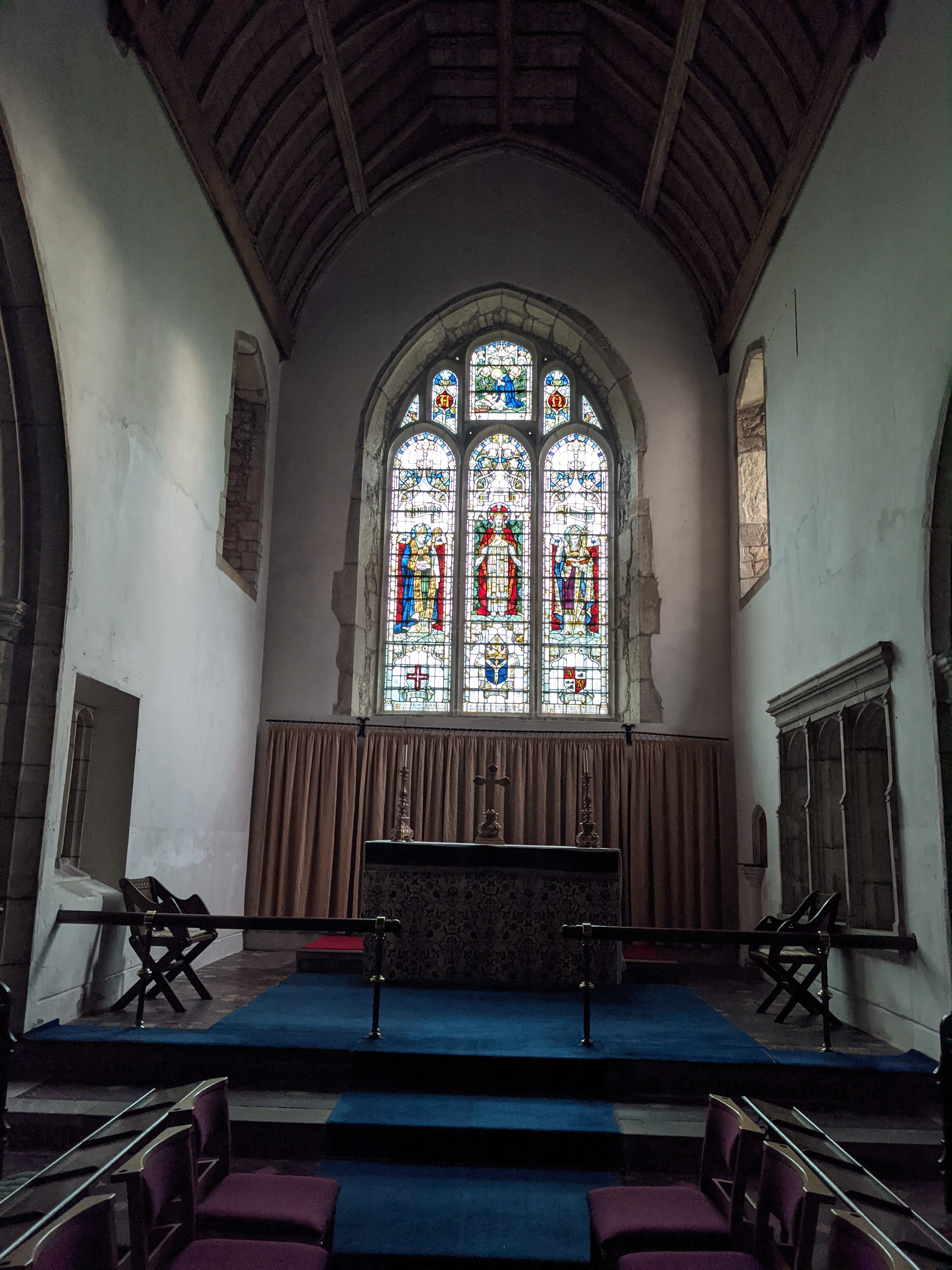
Chancel

Internally, the three-bay arcades on each side of the nave are 15th-century and are divided by hollow-chamfered octagonal columns with moulded capitals and bases. The arch dividing the nave from the chancel is 15th-century, as are the arched openings between each of the aisles and corresponding chancel chapels – the north aisle arch has round columns and those to the south aisle arch are semi-octagonal. The wall to the chancel contains squints on each side. The structure of the nave roof has crown posts and tie beams. The roof of the chancel is barrel vaulted with moulded bosses.

The south wall of the chancel contains a three-seat sedilia and a piscina. Piscina are also located in the south wall of the north aisle, the south wall of the south chapel and by the south door. A 17th-century staircase on the north wall of the tower leads to the bell chamber. The 15th-century rood screen across the east end of nave and both aisles is of eleven panels with fine tracery with slender columns supporting an intricately carved 19th-century fan vault and walkway. Each chapel contains a 15th-century parclose screen.

== Tombs, memorials and monuments ==
The churchyard contains a number of tombs, memorials and monuments; seven of which are listed Grade II.

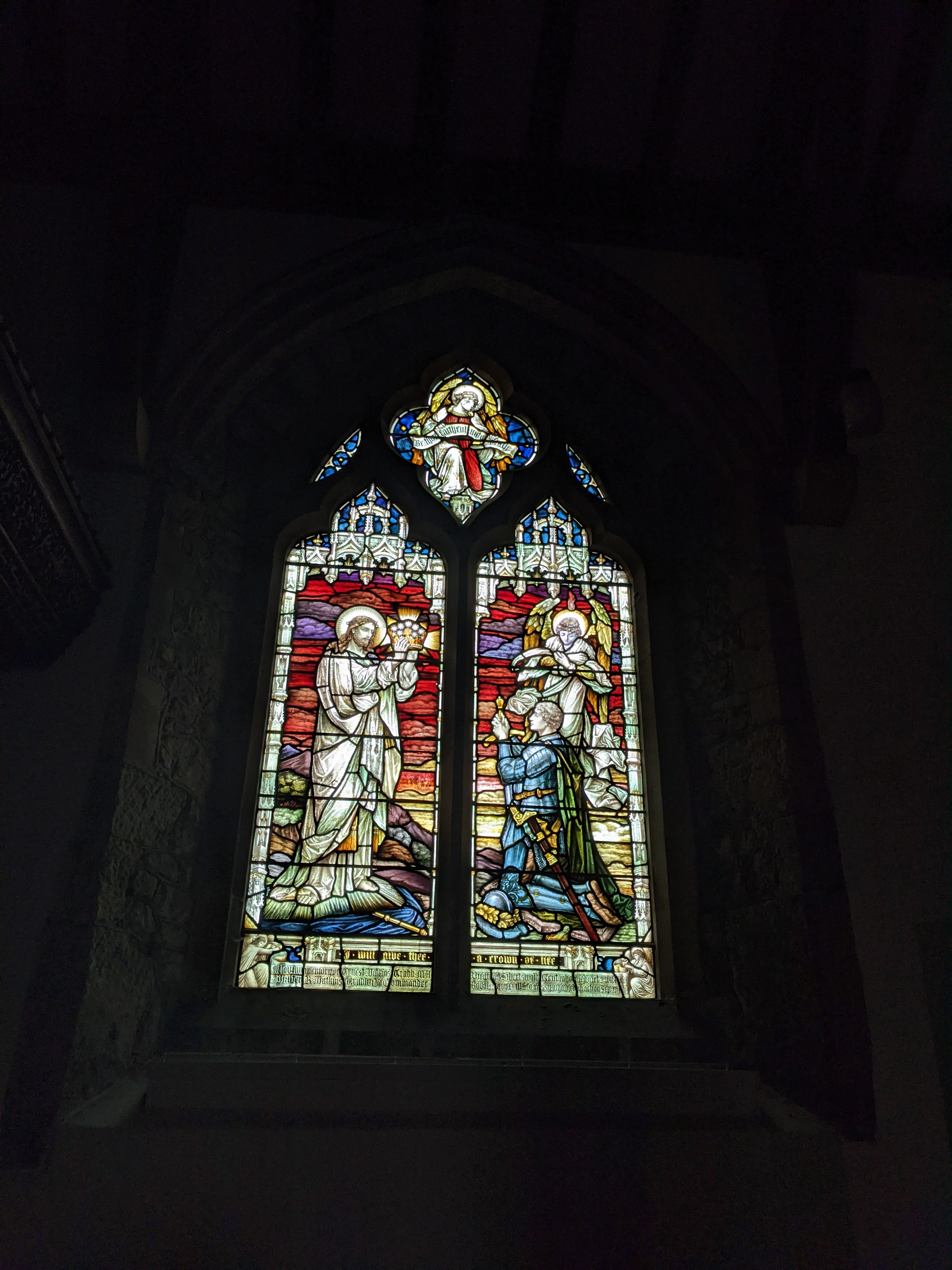
Stained-glass window depicting Revelation 2:10.

The church contains memorials to William Merden (d. 1509), Katherine Lambe (d. 1514) and Jane, Dowager Countess of Carbery (d. 1634, second wife of John Vaughan, 1st Earl of Carbery). Sir William Meredith (d. 1675), Henry Meredith (d. 1710) and Sir Roger Meredith (d. 1738) also have memorials.

== Heritage ==
The church is on the Historic England Heritage at Risk Register.

== See also ==
- Grade I listed buildings in Maidstone
