= St Mary's Church, Lenham =

Coordinates: 51.236711°N 0.719165°E

St Mary's Church
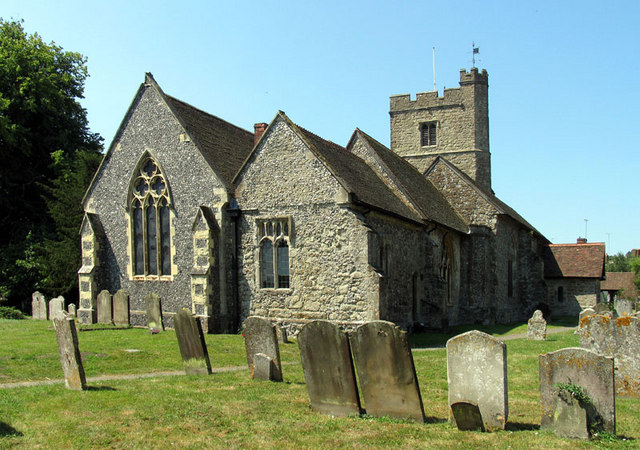
- East end of the church with the buttressed chancel (left) and vestry (right), showing phased construction

- Location within Kent
- OS grid reference: TQ 89917 52127
- Location: Lenham, Kent
- Country: England
- Denomination: Anglican

History
- Status: Parish church

Architecture
- Functional status: Active
- Heritage designation: Grade I
- Designated: 26 April 1968
- Completed: 12th, 13th, 14th and 15th centuries

Specifications
- Materials: Rag-stone, Flint

Administration
- Province: Canterbury
- Diocese: Canterbury
- Archdeaconry: Maidstone
- Deanery: North Downs
- Parish: St Mary's, Lenham

St Mary's is a parish church in Lenham, Kent, England, begun in the 12th century with additions in the next three centuries. It is a Grade I listed building.

== Structure ==
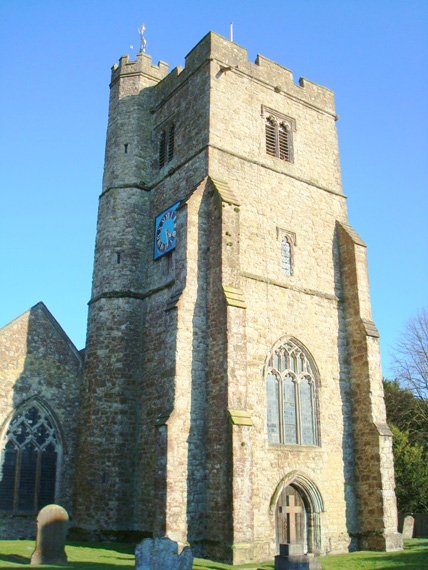
The tower from the north-west

The church was built in several phases and is constructed of local rag-stone and flint with a plain-tiled pitched roof to each section. The tower, built of randomly coursed rag-stone, was constructed in the 15th century and comprises three stages with buttressed corners and a stair turret on the north-east corner. The tower parapet and turret are battlemented and a string course above the third stage belfry windows incorporates gargoyles. The west face of the tower features a large, three-lighted window above the west door.

The nave and chancel were started in the 12th century and are built mostly with random flint walls with some stone elements. The south side of the nave has three arched three-lighted perpendicular style windows. The chancel has a restored three-lighted perpendicular window and two lancet windows with a third window that was formerly a lancet, but has been modified with a flat top. The east end of the chancel was rebuilt in 1867 of knapped flint and features a tall quatrefoiled three-lighted window.

The north side of the nave is flanked with the 14th- and 15th-century north aisle constructed of knapped flint with dressed stone at the, older, eastern end and coursed rag-stone at the western end. The north wall has one perpendicular three-lighted window and two reticulated three-lighted windows with a similar fourth window in the west end. A rood loft stair tower at the east end of the aisle wall abuts the wall of the north chapel which is constructed of uncoursed flints and is probably of Norman. The chapel, which is lower than the aisle, includes a three-lighted reticulated window similar to those of the aisle.

Abutting the north chapel and the chancel at the east end of the church is the 15th-century vestry. Lower than both the chapel and the chancel, it is built of rag-stone blocks with flints above. The north and east walls each have two-lighted flat-topped perpendicular windows. The vestry door is on the north side. On the north side of the aisle, the north porch is 15th-century with a timber-studded gable.

The church is on the Historic England Heritage at Risk Register.

== Interior ==
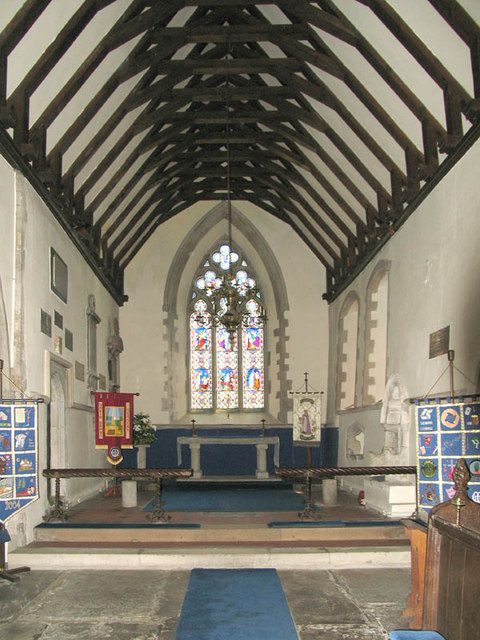
The chancel looking towards the altar and east window

The nave and north aisle are separated by an arcade of four wide bays, three dating from the 14th century and one remodelled in the 15th century. The arches between the nave and chancel, the aisle and chapel, the nave and tower and the two-bay arcade between the chancel and chapel are all 15th century. The roof of the nave is scissor-braced. The roof of the aisle has king post trusses, with those in the eastern bay being chamfered and moulded. The roof of the vestry is trussed with crown posts and the chapel has a collar rafter roof. The 19th-century chancel roof has plain trusses.

Fittings include a 13th-century piscina in the south wall of the chapel, a 15th-century octagonal font, medieval stalls and very mixed panelling in the nave pews. On the south wall of the nave is a large wall painting of St. Michael weighing souls dated to around 1350.

Twenty-first-century improvements to the building (completed in 2012) include the addition of a south extension housing two toilets, replacing the two sets of entrance doors (an outer green baize pair and an inner oak door) with a glass door and ramps to enable easier access for wheelchair users and those with buggies, etc.

== Monuments ==
The church includes monuments to Robert Thompson (d. 1642), Henry Thompson (d. 1648), Hon. John Hamilton (d. 1714), Richard Bead (d. 1723) and Dame Alicia Colpeper (d. 1737). Other monuments in the church are dedicated to members of the Baldock, Brockwell, Codd, Dixon, Marshall and Perry families. The churchyard contains a number of Grade II listed monuments. Doctor Who actor Tom Baker has an (as yet) unused gravestone propped up against the church wall in the graveyard. It reads "Tom Baker 1934-".

== See also ==
- Grade I listed buildings in Maidstone
- Tithe Barn, Lenham
