= Milgate House =

Country house in Thurnham, Kent, England

- Location within Kent

General information
- Location: Thurnham, England
- Coordinates: 51.262968°N 0.589791°E
- Construction started: mid to late 16th century

Milgate House, previously Milgate Park, is an English country house in Thurnham near Maidstone, Kent. The oldest parts of the house were constructed in the mid to late 16th century and alterations and additions were made in the 17th and 18th centuries. The house is a Grade I listed building.

== History ==
During the 14th and 15th centuries, the Milgate estate was owned by the Coloigne or Coluney family. It was sold to the Stonehouse family in the later 15th century who passed it around 1560 to Sir Thomas Fludd (d. 1607), a courtier to Queen Elizabeth I.

It was probably Sir Thomas who had Milgate House built. Physician Robert Fludd, his seventh child, was born there in 1574. A second Thomas Fludd, son of the first, sold the house to William Cage in 1624. The house remained in the Cage family during the remainder of the 17th century and throughout the 18th century. At the end of the 17th century, it was owned by William Cage, three times member of parliament for Rochester, who carried out extensive alterations. His son, Lewis Cage, also altered the house in the 1760s. In the mid 19th century, the house became the property of Sir Brook Bridges on his marriage to Fanny Cage.

By 1900, the house was owned by Walter Fremlin of the local Fremlins' brewing family. Following his death in 1925, most of the 2,375 acres (961 ha) estate was sold off in lots. The house and the residual estate then passed through various hands. By the late 1960s, only 10 acres (4.0 ha) remained with the house. In the 1970s, the house was the home of Lady Caroline Blackwood and Robert Lowell.

== Building ==
The house is approached from the north. The main entrance is in the centre of the north wing which was constructed with the left return wing in the early 18th century as an L-shaped addition to the earlier house. Further additions were made in the mid and late 18th century.

The red brick north wing is two storeys high with an attic and is seven bays wide with the three centre bays projecting slightly. The left return (east end) of the north wing is four bays wide. Large sash windows on both floors of each are framed with decorative gauged brickwork. The central projection of the north wing is topped by a pediment containing an oval Oeil-de-boeuf window and the main door in its centre is flanked by Corinthian pilasters supporting an entablature and frieze with the initials "WC". The pitched roof is tiled and contains a dormer window each side of the central pediment. A two-storey mid 18th-century bay extends the right return (west end) of the north wing.

Behind the north wing are three earlier two-storey wings dating from the mid or late 16th century surrounding a central courtyard. The structures are believed to be timber framed although the brick façades were refaced in the late 17th century or early 18th century. The pitched roofs contain dormers on each of the three sides – two to the west side and three each to the east and the south sides. The east and west wings are six bays long and the south seven bays. A large chimney stack with four chimneys forms the right end of the west wing.

== See also ==
- Grade I listed buildings in Maidstone
