= Tithe Barn, Lenham =

Grade I listed building near Maidstone, Kent, England

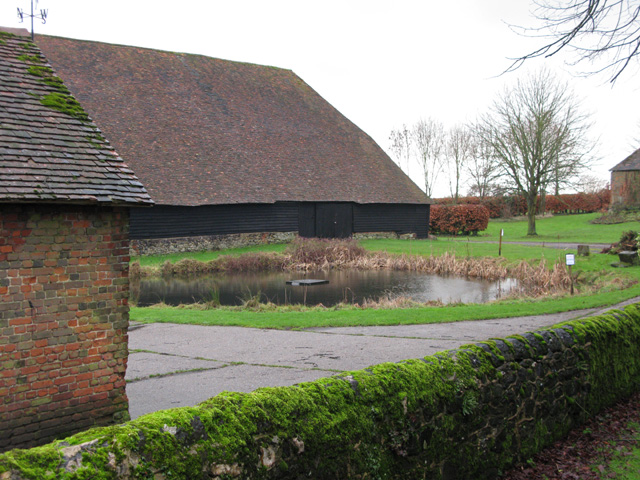

- Location within Kent

General information
- Location: Lenham, England
- Coordinates: 51.236093°N 0.718656°E
- Completed: late 14th century

The Tithe Barn in Lenham, Kent, England is a large medieval tithe barn to the south of St Mary's Church. It was probably built in the late 14th century and is a Grade I listed building.

The timber framed structure has internal aisles on both sides and both ends and sits on a timber sill supported on a stone plinth or on stone pedestals. It is nine bays long, two of which were added in the late 15th century or early 16th century and is weatherboarded with a tiled hip roof. The main part of the roof is supported on crown post trusses with the aisle roofs formed by raking rafters between the wall studs and the main truss posts.

The barn belonged to St Augustine's, Canterbury, and was originally one of a pair, but the other burnt down in 1962.

== See also ==
- Grade I listed buildings in Maidstone
