= St Mary the Virgin Church, Thurnham =

Coordinates: 51.289334°N 0.585896°E

Church of St Mary the Virgin, Thurnham
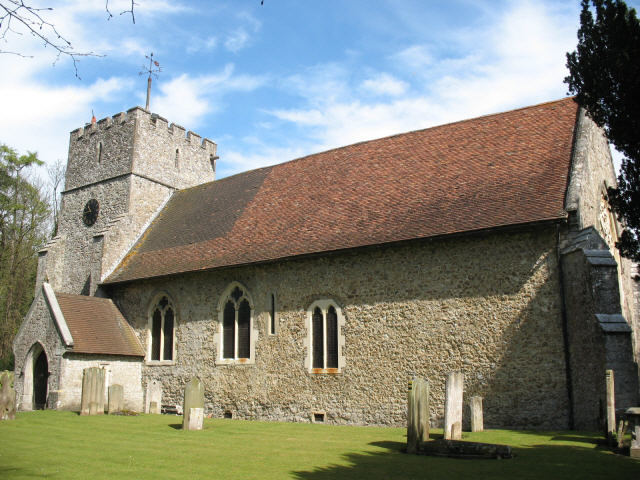

- Location within Kent
- OS grid reference: TQ 80409 57642
- Location: Thurnham, Kent
- Country: England
- Denomination: Anglican

History
- Status: Parish church

Architecture
- Functional status: Active
- Heritage designation: Grade I
- Designated: 26 April 1968
- Completed: 12th to early 17th centuries

Administration
- Province: Canterbury
- Diocese: Canterbury
- Archdeaconry: Maidstone
- Deanery: North Downs

St Mary the Virgin is a small parish church in Thurnham, Kent. Begun in the 12th century, it is a Grade I listed building.

== Building ==
The church was begun in the 12th century with alterations made up to the early 17th century. The church comprises a continuous nave and chancel with a chapel at the east end of the north side of the nave. Porches on the north and south side abut the west tower. Apart from the porches and the chapel, the church is constructed of random flint and has a plain tiled roof. The porches are of uneven stone blocks and the chapel is of galleted stone.

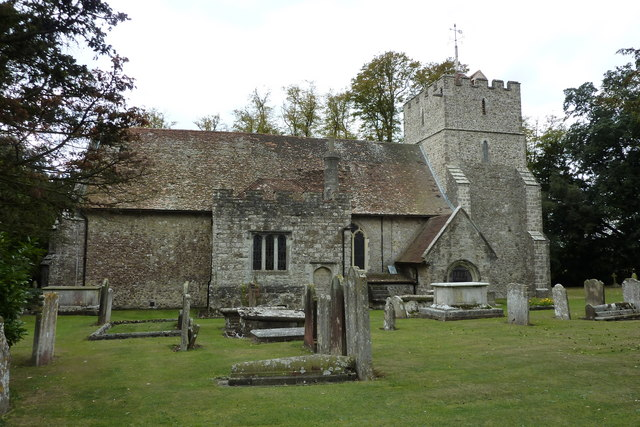
The north side of the church

The west tower is in two stages with a battlemented parapet with buttresses at the four corners. A small window is above the west door and the belfry stage has single-lighted openings. Edward Hasted describe the church in 1798 as having a pointed steeple, but this is no longer present. The west end of the nave and chancel is 12th or 13th century and the east end 14th century. The south wall contains two restored perpendicular gothic windows at the west. The north wall has a single restored perpendicular window. The east end of the chancel has a large restored window. The porches are early 15th century with gabled roofs and the chapel was added circa 1603 with a hipped roof behind a battlemented parapet. Each has a plinth and the chapel has a large window on its east side.

Internally, the nave is separated from the chapel with a 15th-century arch. The nave roof has crown posts; the chancel roof has collar purlins, but no crown posts. The Reredos is heavily carved and was made in Oberammergau. It is dedicated to Mrs Julia Jane Hampson (d. 1904, wife of the vicar, Rev. William Hampson). The font is octagonal and possibly 14th century. The pews are late 18th or early 19th century. The chapel is dedicated to Sir Henry Cutt and was paid for by his wife Lady Barbara Cutt. The church contains memorials to Lady Barbara (d. 1618), her second husband William Covert, Richard Sheldon (d. 1736), Mariae Dering (d. 1725), Thomas Burwash (d. 1791) and Thomas Wise (d. 1790) and family.

The churchyard contains a number of Grade II listed monuments.

== See also ==
- Grade I listed buildings in Maidstone
