= Bell Farm House, Harrietsham =

Building in Harrietsham, Kent, England

Bell Farm House
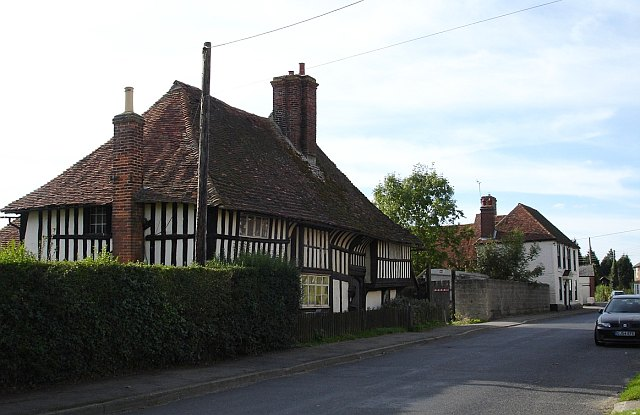
- Bell Farm House from the east

- Location within Kent

General information
- Location: Harrietsham, England
- Coordinates: 51.240029°N 0.679428°E
- Completed: c. 1500

Bell Farm House (previously known as The Old House) is a former farmhouse in Harrietsham, Kent, England, built around 1500 and described as "unusually well preserved".

The house is a two-storey timber framed structure with a steeply pitched plain tiled hipped roof. The right and left ends of the front façade and the two end façades are jettied with moulded bressumer beams carrying the load of the upper floor. Windows of various sizes and dates provide illumination to the interior. Internally, the roof structure is formed of tie beams and crown posts, one of which is octagonal with mouldings. The stairs are original and the hall wall shows smoke blackening from the time before the construction of the chimney when open hearths and roof apertures were used in this type of building.

The house is a Grade I listed building.

== See also ==
- Grade I listed buildings in Maidstone
