= Emily Innes =

British traveller and writer

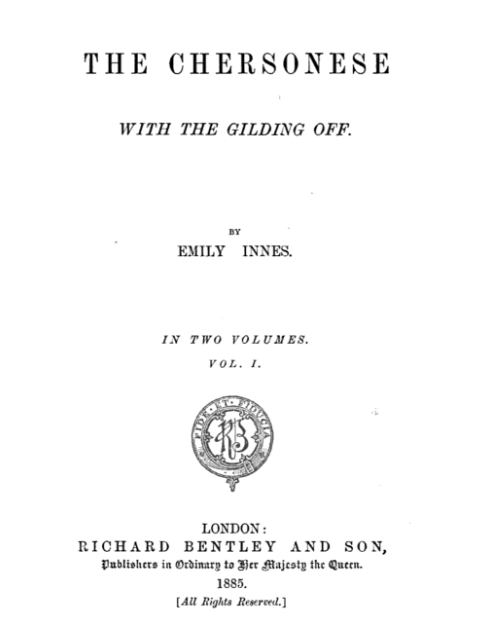
- The Chersonese With The Gilding Off, 1885
- Born: 5 March 1843; Boxley
- Died: 7 November 1927 (aged 84); Nairn

Emily Anne Innes née Robertson (5 March 1843 – 7 November 1927) was a British traveller and writer. She was 32 when she married in Canterbury Cathedral before she was taken to the Raj of Sarawak in what is now Malaysia. Her husband lost and regained another job and her host was murdered when she went to visit Pangkor Island. She is known because of a book she wrote about colonial life in Malaysia.

== Life ==
Innes was born in Boxley in 1843 where her father, James Craigie Robertson, was curate at St Mary's and All Saints Church. Her mother was born Julia Maria Stevenson and her father went on to be a religious historian. In 1846 the family moved to Bekesbourne. Her father was an important figure in her life and when her siblings left the home she remained. She was the younger sister who kept her mother company while her father's success led to him taking lunch at The Athenaeum Club. Her elder sisters married in 1865 and 1869.

In 1875 her wedding was at Canterbury Cathedral where her father was a canon and librarian. Her husband was James Innes who was the son of Cosmo Innes. Her husband had come home to marry her. He was eight years older than her and he was a colonial administrator. He had been assigned to be treasurer at the Raj of Sarawak in what is now a state of Malaysia. Her husband had a former life in China which had led to his (presumed) bankruptcy in the 1870s. One of her wedding presents was a piano. The piano was said to have been designed to be used in the colonies and it went to their first home.

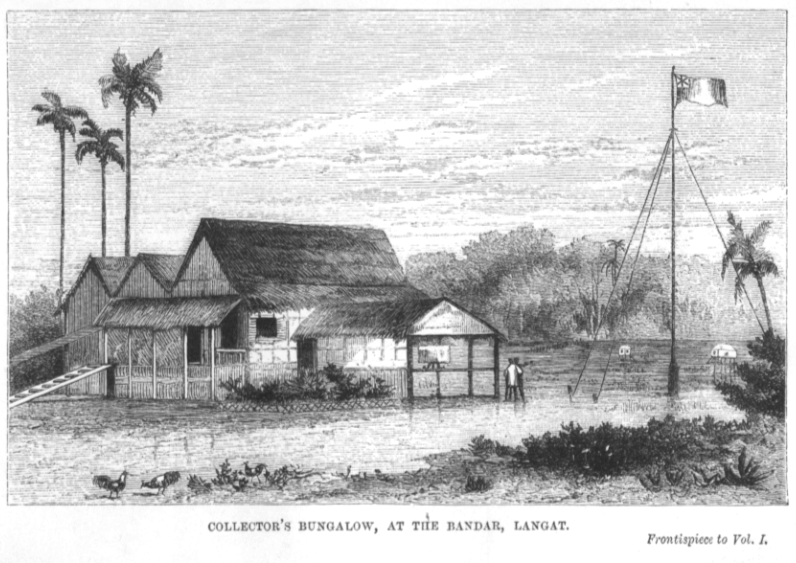
Emily Innes lived here in Sarawak at Kuala Langat

In 1876 her husband's laissez faire approach to management came to a head. One of the staff had absconded with a fair sum and the 1875 accounts were showing a loss. Her husband was moved aside. He was then sacked at the end of March 1876 when little evidence was found of any rigour in the accounts. Sir William Jervois came to the rescue when he offered James another job. As Emily noted in her later book the standard required to obtain work was low as few wanted to work in the area. They were based at Kuala Langat for six years. She went to visit Pangkor Island where she stayed with the district officer and his wife. The house was attacked and the district officer, Captain Lloyd, was murdered by the robbers. Once she were conscious she, the murdered officer's very ill wife and her unharmed children went to report the incident in Penang.

She and her husband were finding few allies and friends. Her husband disagreed with his superior (Hugh Low's) approach and although she could see Low's reasons she decided, as always, to support her husband. He then fell out with William Bloomfield Douglas in 1881 and after that they returned.

In 1885 she published The Chersonese With The Gilding Off in two volumes which described the life she had found in South East Asia. The title was a reply to Isabella Bird who had published her book "The Golden Chersonese" based on a short visit of five weeks she had made in 1879. Bird had not met Innes and although Innes recognised that Bird's book was accurate, it did not include many details. This was because Bird had not seen them and she had. Isabella Bird's book was complemented by the book by Innes, however commentators have noted that her account was shaped by her "bitter experience".

The book did not attract a lot of attention when it was published and Bird's reaction is unknown. Her husband made a living of sorts dealing in tea and from an inheritance until he died in 1901. Innes died in Nairn in Scotland in 1927.
