= Stoneacre, Kent =

Stoneacre
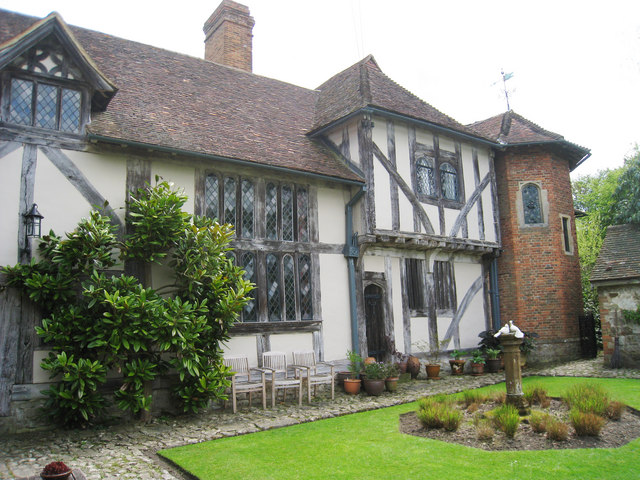
- The courtyard

- Stoneacre shown within Kent
- 51.252209°N 0.577664°E
- Location: Otham, Kent, England
- OS grid reference: TQ7998053494

History
- Built: Late 15th century
- Built for: John Ellys

Site notes
- Elevation: 75 metres (246 ft)
- Restored: 1920s
- Restored by: Aymer Vallance
- Governing body: The National Trust

Listed Building
- Official name: Stoneacre and Path Between Front Door and Road
- Type: Grade II*
- Designated: 25-Jul-1952
- Reference no.: 1250995

Stoneacre is a small National Trust property in Otham, near Maidstone, Kent in southern England. The property is a half-timbered yeoman farmer's house dating from the 15th century, together with a small garden, orchard and meadows. The house is a Grade II* listed building.

== History ==
The site overlies an outcrop of Kentish ragstone and from this the name is thought to originate. Hasted's History of Kent mentions that during the reign of Edward II one John Ellys resided here. A will from a century later records another John Ellis who died a wealthy man. His son (also called John Ellys) built the hall house in the 1480s. The steep slope and poor foundation led to problems with the north wing in the middle of the 16th century. The cellars and ground floor had to be rebuilt in stone with buttresses to stop the slippage, as is visible today. At this date high hall houses were going out of fashion and the opportunity was taken to insert and upper floor into the original hall. The Ellys family continued to hold Stoneacre until 1725 when it was sold and occupied by tenants.

In 1920 the ruin was purchased by Aymer Vallance. Aymer was a 58-year-old bachelor when he bought the property, but in 1921 he married Lucy Ada Hennell. Aymer set about reconstructing the house to his vision of a Tudor yeoman's dwelling. As a consequence of reopening the hall to its full height, two bedrooms were lost. These were provided by an extension to the south with the library underneath. The old single-storey scullery to the rear was removed and a 16th-century farmhouse which was to be demolished, North Bore Place from Chiddingstone Kent, was used to build a new two-storey wing westwards from the north end. The new wing provided a servants' hall and kitchen below with two maid's bedrooms above. In 1928 the property was presented to the National Trust. As of 2022, the site opened monthly until October.

== Description ==
=== Exterior ===
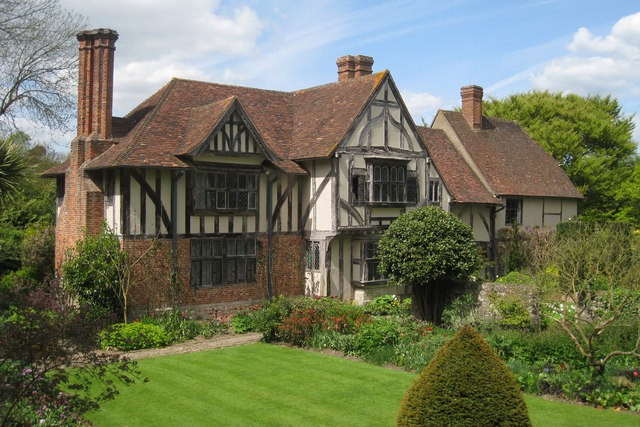
Stoneacre from the southeast showing the library and bedroom extension

The front of the house is the eastern elevation. The north end has a stone built lower floor with a timber framed upper. There is no jetty. The central section has the main door and to its left the large hall window going from the foundation plinth to the eaves, the building is timber framed with rendered infilling. This is the hall section, so there is no upper floor and hence no jetty. A two-storey bay with jetty marks the end of the original hall; beyond is a brick-built lower room with a timber-framed upper floor. In the upper floor is a 12-light window which was moved to the new structure. Originally it had lit a bedroom on the 16th-century inserted floor. On the western elevation, at the junction of the new south extension to the original hall, is an octagonal stair turret. Moving northwards there is the original two-storey jettied quarters, the double-height hall with its reconstructed west window. The original building is obscured from just beyond the screens passage by the 20th-century north wing.

The stair turret and west front of the north wing were brought from North Bore Place when it was demolished and therefore are original 16th-century work (dates on arches are 1547 and 1629) although incorporated into a 20th-century structure.

=== Interior ===
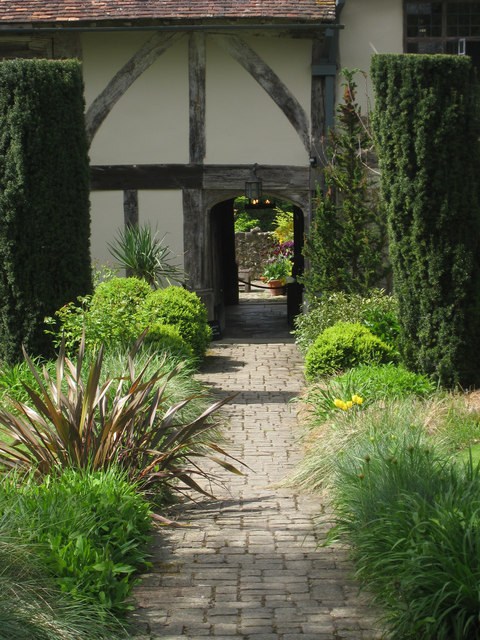
The front door with view through the screens passage.

The main entrance door was restored by Vallance, but is original. Through the door is the screens passage. The framework of the screen is original, but the panels are by Vallance because the originals had rotted. The hall itself is dominated by the roof, which is supported by a huge tie-beam carrying a crown post consisting of four engaged columns. When the hall was divided the original central hearth was replaced by a brick-and-rubble chimney. During Vallance's restoration work this was in turn replaced by a 15th-century fireplace from the George public house in Sittingbourne. The chimney above is 20th century.

The drawing room or parlour formed part of the original house, presumably fulfilling a similar function as a private room apart from the hall. The fireplace is from North Bore, and the stained glass is reproduction. The curtains are original 1880s and rare enough to be noted as such in the guide book.

Above the drawing room is a solar with a similar, if smaller-scale, roof to that of the hall. The oriel window dates from the restoration but is based upon the plan of the original. Flanking the oriel are two original windows with rare slots to carry vertical shutters.

== See also ==
- Similar hall houses in Otham:
  - Otham Manor
  - Synyards
