= Thurnham, Kent =

Village in Kent, England

Coordinates: 51.2914°N 0.5897°E

Thurnham
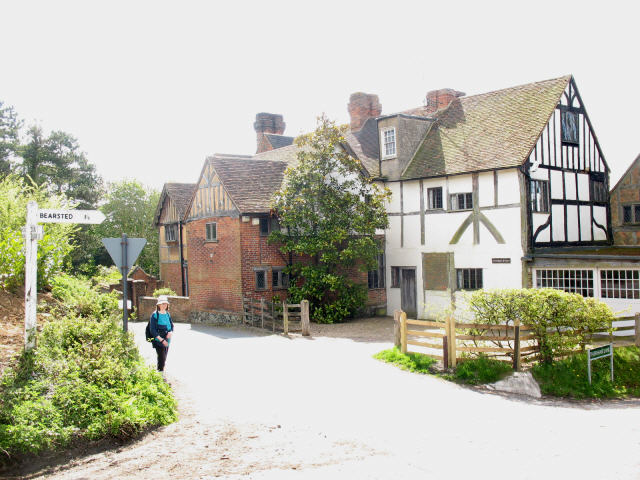
- Thornham Friars

- Location within Kent
- Population: 1,207 (2011)
- OS grid reference: TQ805579
- Civil parish: Thurnham
- District: Maidstone
- Shire county: Kent
- Region: South East
- Country: England
- Sovereign state: United Kingdom
- Post town: MAIDSTONE
- Postcode district: ME14
- Dialling code: 01622
- Police: Kent
- Fire: Kent
- Ambulance: South East Coast
- UK Parliament: Faversham and Mid Kent

Thurnham is a village and civil parish which lies at the foot of the North Downs 3 miles (4.8 km) north east of Maidstone in the Borough of Maidstone and ceremonial county of Kent in England. It had a population of 1,085 in 2001 including Weavering, which increased to 1,205 following the 2011 Census.

There have been several archaeological finds in the area: an Anglo-Saxon burial ground was discovered within the grounds of Thurnham Friars in 1913, a 7th-century gold cross was found in 1967 and the remains of a Roman house were excavated in 1933. The remains of Thurnham Castle are just north of the village. Two miles further north are the fragmentary remains of Binbury Castle, a medieval fortified manor house beside a medieval motte.

St Mary's church (a Norman building) and Milgate House are Grade I listed buildings.

The railway station at Bearsted, opened on 1 July 1884, was originally named Bearsted and Thurnham. Residents of the village joined forces with the neighbouring village of Bearsted, in voicing their objections to the proposed Kent International Gateway development.

== See also ==
- Listed buildings in Thurnham, Kent
