= West Farleigh =

Village in Kent, England

Coordinates: 51.2502°N 0.4540°E

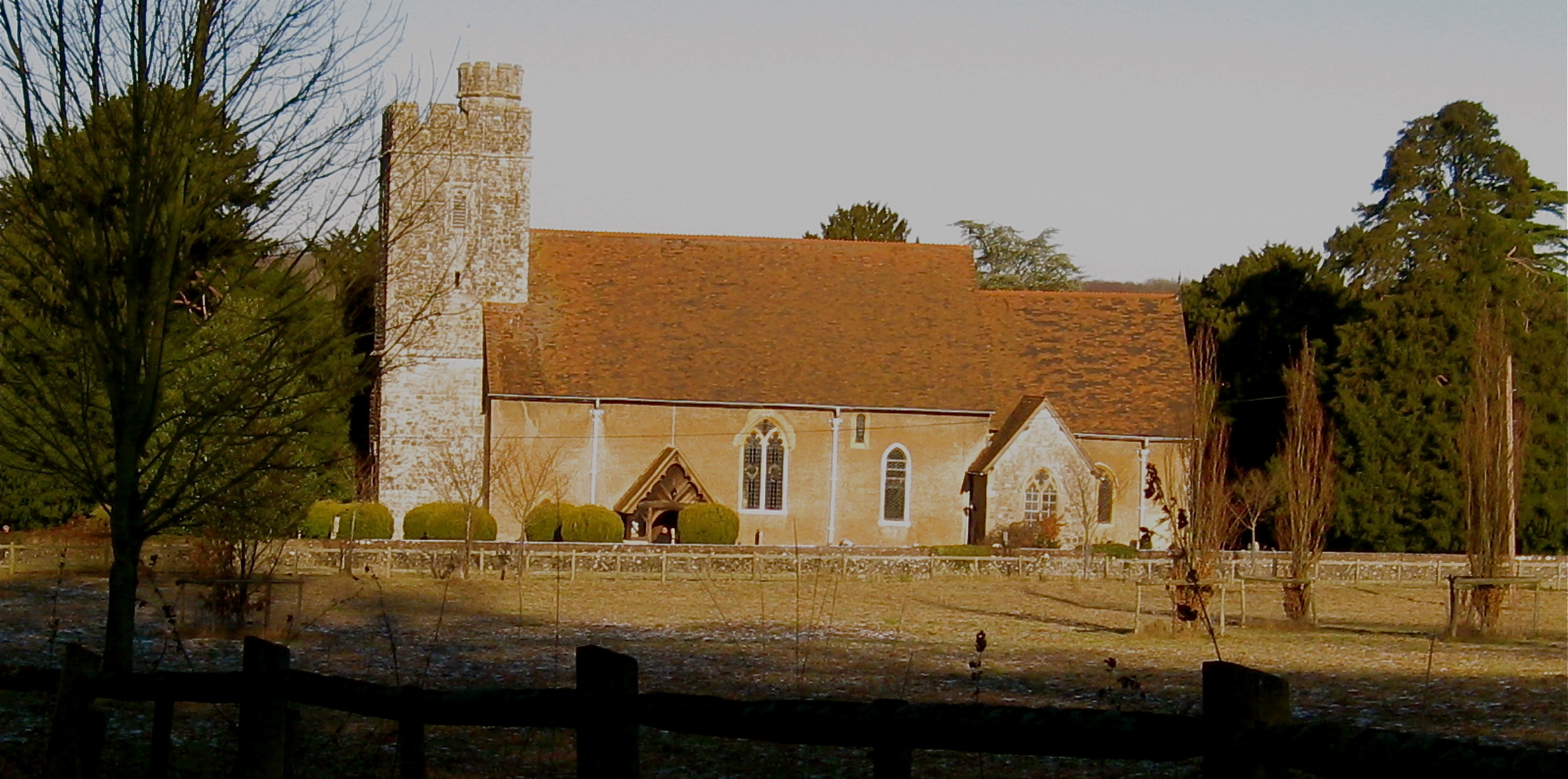
- All Saints Church

- Location within Kent
- OS grid reference: TQ715534
- District: Maidstone
- Shire county: Kent
- Region: South East
- Country: England
- Sovereign state: United Kingdom
- Post town: Maidstone
- Postcode district: ME15
- Dialling code: 01622
- Police: Kent
- Fire: Kent
- Ambulance: South East Coast
- UK Parliament: Weald of Kent
- Website: West Farleigh Parish Council

West Farleigh is a village and civil parish four miles (6 km) southwest of Maidstone in the county of Kent. The parish has a population of approximately 450, and is bounded by the civil parishes of East Farleigh, Hunton, Yalding, and over the River Medway by Wateringbury, Teston and Barming. The village has two pubs: The Tickled Trout and The Good Intent, a third, The White House, ceased trading in 2020. Adjacent to the church is the village cricket ground. The village is twinned with the northern German village of Ringstedt, near Bremerhaven.

The Sports Club runs a football section involving: two senior Saturday sides, currently both play in the Sevenoaks and District Football League, an occasional veterans' side, and several junior sides, with the younger age groups playing their home games at Elmscroft Park, Charlton Lane. An annual tour, once mainly between the club's footballers and that of Ringstedt (but now includes many from the wider community) has been an ongoing, ever-flourishing event since 1988. The cricket section of the sports club runs two senior teams on Saturdays, playing in the Kent County Village League. The netball section plays in the Malling and Maidstone Netball League. Notable players who have played for the club include; David Sadler (Manchester United), Mark Beeney (Leeds United) and Alessia Russo who began her club football in the U5's, U6's and U7's (Arsenal and England Lionesses).

The club also runs the village's Firework Display on each first Friday in November.

The village produces its own monthly newsletter "Life-Line", and an events' website "The Farleighs".

The primary school, which had one classroom, closed in 1968. One of its two teachers at the time, was Miss Whittle, the daughter of Sir Frank Whittle, inventor of the (turbo) jet engine. The village's post office and only shop closed in 1986.

The parish church of 'All Saints' dates back to the 11th century.

== See also ==
- Listed buildings in West Farleigh
