= James Craigie Robertson =

Scottish Anglican churchman and author

James Craigie Robertson (1813 – 9 July 1882) was a Scottish Anglican churchman, canon of Canterbury Cathedral, and author of a History of the Christian Church.

== Life ==
Robertson was born at Aberdeen, where his father was a merchant; his mother's maiden name was Craigie. His early education was mainly at Udny Academy, but he is said to have been at twelve other schools. His father was a Presbyterian, but his mother's family was Episcopalian.

Robertson studied for a time for the Scottish bar, but having decided on ordination in the Church of England, he entered Trinity College, Cambridge in 1831, and graduated B.A. in 1834, and M.A. in 1838. He did not attempt to take honours, but spent vacations in Germany, and studied German literature. He was ordained in 1836.

After serving two curacies, Robertson was instituted in 1846 to the vicarage of Bekesbourne, near Canterbury. There he concentrated on historical research. In 1859 he was made canon of Canterbury, and from 1864 to 1874 was professor of ecclesiastical history at King's College, London. In 1864 he was elected a member of the Athenæum Club as "a person eminent in literature".

Robertson died at Canterbury on 9 July 1882, while working on the last volume of his "Memorials of Becket". He was a moderate high churchman, out of sympathy with ritualism. Close friends included William MacPherson, John Murray III the publisher, Dean Stanley, and Alexander Dyce; and he knew Alfred Tennyson well.

== Works ==
In 1850 Robertson began his Church History, his major work; volume i. appeared in 1852, and volume iv., bringing the narrative to the Protestant Reformation, in 1873. This initial edition consisted of four volumes. A revised edition (in 8 vols.), entitled History of the Christian Church from the Apostolic Age to the Reformation, was issued in 1874–5.

While still a curate Robertson wrote a book entitled How shall we conform to the Liturgy? (1843, 3rd edit. 1869). It argued the impossibility of a literal compliance with all the rubrics, and the consequent need of tolerance and elasticity. Other works were:

- Peter Heylyn's History of the Reformation (1849), editor.
- Writings on the Gorham case (1850).
- Olshausen on the Romans (1850), translator.
- Sketches of Church History, for the Christian Knowledge Society (pt. i. 1855, pt. ii. 1878).
- Becket: a Biography (1859).
- Plain Lectures on the Growth of the Papal Power (1876).

He also edited John Bargrave's Alexander VII and the College of Cardinals (Camden Soc. 1866), and for the Master of the Rolls Materials for the History of Archbishop Thomas Becket (vol. i. 1875, vol. vi. 1882); the last volume was completed after Robertson's death by his coadjutor, Dr. J. Brigstocke Sheppard. Besides his other work, he was a learned contributor to the Quarterly Review.

== Family ==
Robertson married in 1839 Julia Maria Stevenson, the sister of his college friend, Richard Stevenson, fellow of Trinity College, Cambridge, and they had six children. The third of their daughters was the author Emily Innes. She stayed at home until she was 32 before leaving for Sarawak.

== Notes ==
Attribution

- This article incorporates text from a publication now in the public domain: Lee, Sidney, ed. (1896). "Robertson, James Craigie". Dictionary of National Biography. Vol. 48. London: Smith, Elder & Co.
