= St Nicholas's Church, Otham =

Coordinates: 51.257816°N 0.562741°E

St Nicholas's Church
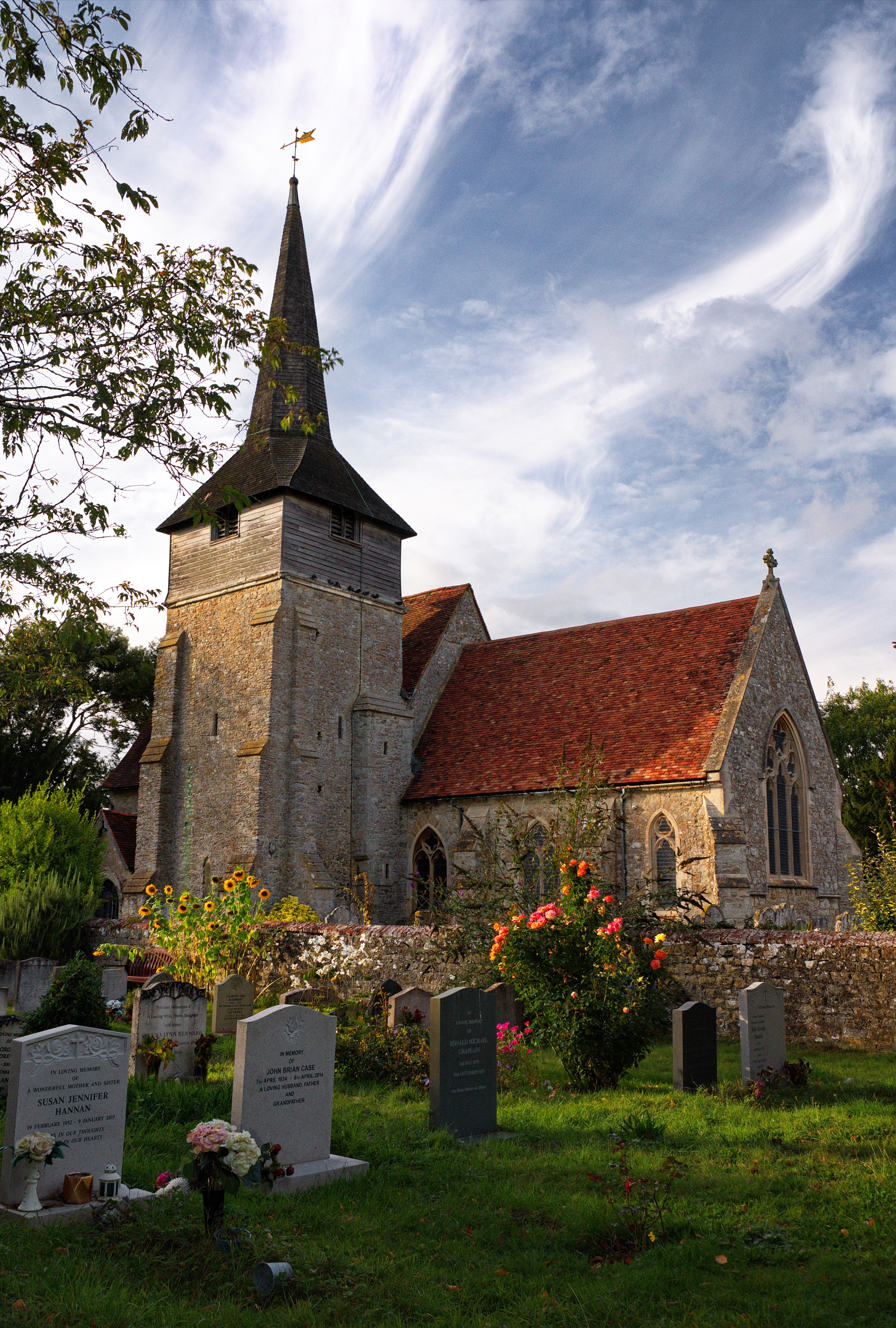
- The south side of the tower and chancel

- Location within Kent
- OS grid reference: TQ 78917 54081
- Location: Otham, Kent
- Country: England
- Denomination: Anglican

History
- Status: Parish church

Architecture
- Functional status: Active
- Heritage designation: Grade I
- Designated: 23 May 1967
- Completed: Late 12th, 13th and 14th centuries

Administration
- Province: Canterbury
- Diocese: Canterbury
- Archdeaconry: Maidstone
- Deanery: North Downs
- Parish: St Nicholas, Otham

St Nicholas's is a parish church in Otham, Kent begun in the 12th century with additions in the next two centuries. It is a Grade I listed building.

== History and architecture ==
Construction of the church began in the late 12th century. From this period date the tower, the north and south walls of the nave and the lower chancel, all of which were constructed with uncoursed stone and tufa rubble walls. The chapels on the north side were added in the 14th century. The steeply pitched roof is covered with clay tiles.

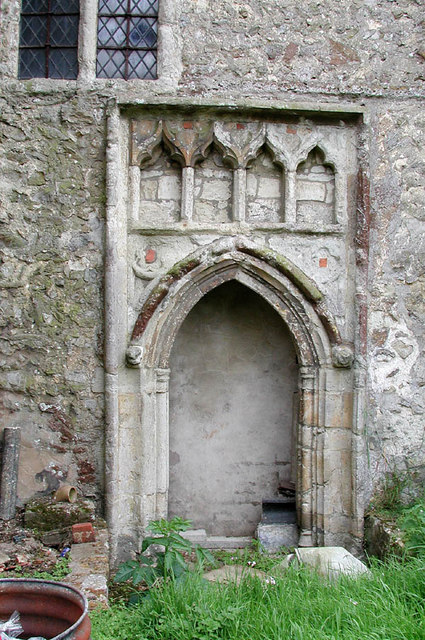
14th-century doorway on the north side of the nave

The square tower is attached to the south side of the church at the junction between the nave and the chancel. It is buttressed on both faces of the external corners and has been extended vertically with a 16th-century timber weatherboarded belfry topped by a timber hipped roof and an octagonal timber spire. On the east side of the tower is a partly projecting stair tower and a blocked-in doorway. Small rectangular and lancet windows pierce the tower at each level; those on the stair tower dating from the 13th or 14th centuries.

The short nave features a rubble walled windowless porch attached to the south side in the 19th century and a gabled west end rebuilt in the same century with a window of four lights in the 13th-century style. A two-lighted window on the north side is 13th-century and the two-lighted windows on the right and left sides of the porch are 14th- and 19th-century respectively. On the north side of the nave, a blocked-in doorway with a pointed arch surrounded by a carved rectangular architrave is 14th-century.

The three windows on the south side of the chancel, the lancet window on its north side and the three-lighted window in the east end are all 19th-century, but in a 13th-century style. Attached centrally to the north side of the nave and chancel as a pitched-roofed extension, the chapels include three two-lighted windows, the one in the nave chapel being quatrefoiled. The roof to the nave is supported on three crown posts on unbraced tie beams. The roof to the chancel is 19th-century and boarded.

== Furnishings and monuments ==
Internally, a 14th-century font is set on a chamfered base with a face, two calves' heads and a leaf. Monuments in the chancel are to Thomas Hendley (d. 1590), Levinus Buffkin (d. 1622), John Hendley (d. 1676), Thomas Fludd (d. 1688) and William and Dorothea Henley (d. 1762 and 1785). In the Chancel chapel are monuments to Elizabeth Hendley (d. 1697) and Bowyer Hendley (d. 1742). The churchyard contains two Grade II listed monuments.

== See also ==
- Grade I listed buildings in Maidstone
