= Synyards =

House in Otham, Kent, England

- Location within Kent

General information
- Location: Otham, England
- Coordinates: 51.248927°N 0.573955°E
- Completed: Late 15th century

Synyards is a late 15th-century house in Otham, Kent.

The house was built in the late 15th century with additions in the 16th century and in 1663. It is a mostly two-storey timber-framed hall house with a steeply pitched plain tile hipped roof. The house has a jettied bays on each end of the main western elevation with a gabled dormer bay to the right of the midpoint which is dated 1663. A first floor was inserted at each end of the building in the 16th century and the third floor at the south end was added when the dormer was constructed. A variety of window sizes and types from various periods provide illumination to the interior. The walls on the ground floor have 16th century panelling in some parts and wall paintings of a lion and dragon and merman and mermaid cover the walls of the room in the north end of the first floor.

Synyards was restored in 1905 by P. M. Johnston. The house is a Grade I listed building.

== See also ==
- Similar hall houses in Otham:
  - Otham Manor
  - Stoneacre
- Grade I listed buildings in Maidstone
