= Otham Manor =

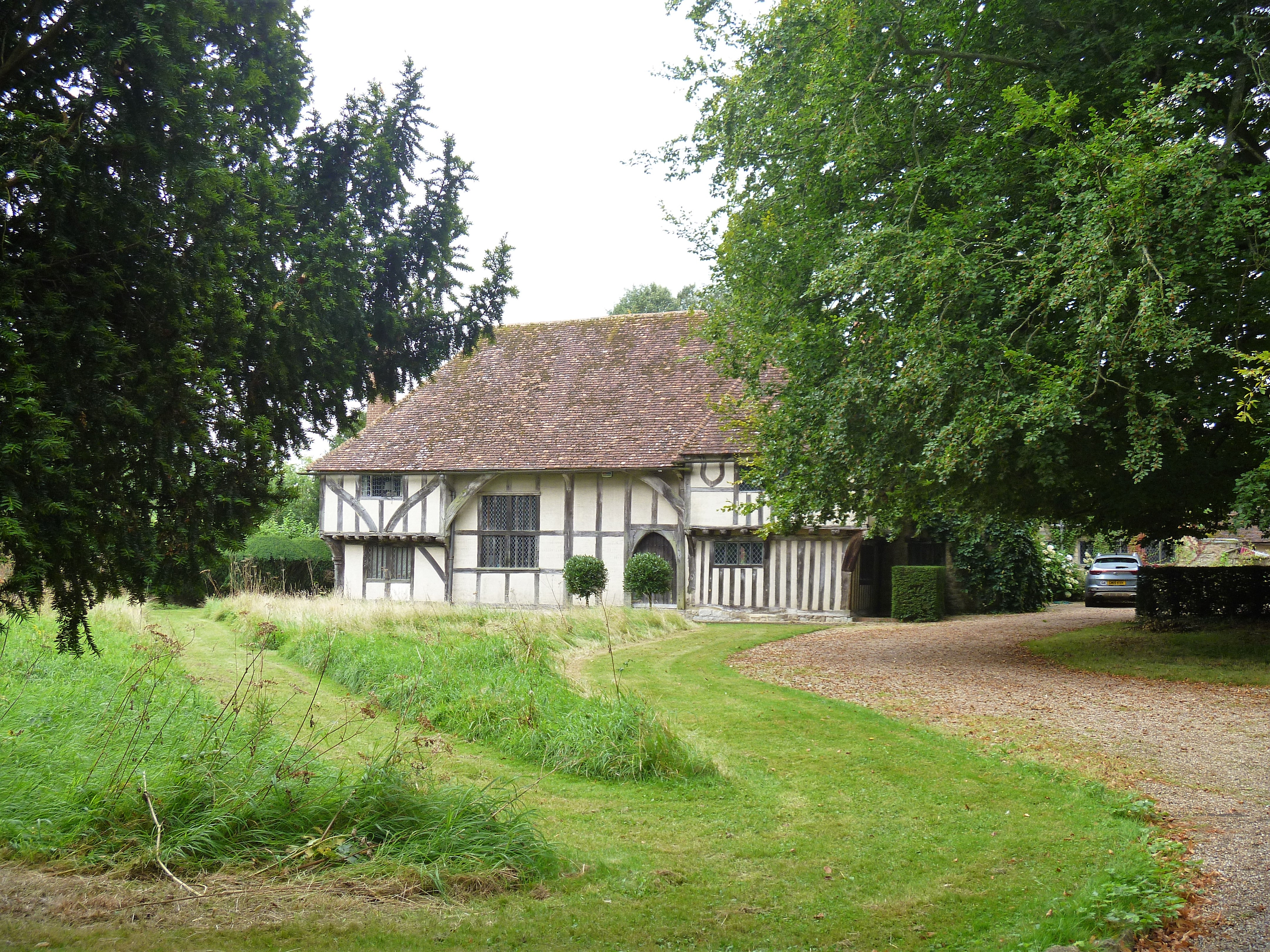

- Location within Kent

General information
- Location: Otham, England
- Coordinates: 51.252372°N 0.574334°E
- Completed: Late 14th century, 16th century

Otham Manor, previously known as Wardes, is a late 14th-century manor house in Otham, Kent.

The house was built in the late 14th century, probably around 1370, and was altered and extended in the 16th century. It is a L-shaped two-storey timber-framed hall house; the north wing being the older part and the south wing being from the 16th century. The north wing has jettied bays at each end; the western bay having been rebuilt. The clay tiled hipped roof is steeply pitched with a gable to the south end of the south wing. Internally the roof structure is exposed with tie beams and king post.

The house was restored in 1912 by Sir Louis du Pan Mallet, ambassador to the Sublime Porte. Sir Louis engaged the architect Philip Tilden who extended the house with a wing to the west. The whole house is a Grade I listed building.

The Listing described the mansion as a "GV I House, formerly cottages, now house. Late C14 with C16 alterations and additions". The estate was in a state of "semi-dereliction by the early 1990s" according to Country Life (magazine). It was subsequently restored by new owners and listed for sale in 2019.

== See also ==
- Similar hall houses in Otham:
  - Synyards
  - Stoneacre
- Grade I listed buildings in Maidstone
