= Hunton, Kent =

Village and civil parish in Kent, England

Coordinates: 51.216667°N 0.466667°E

Hunton
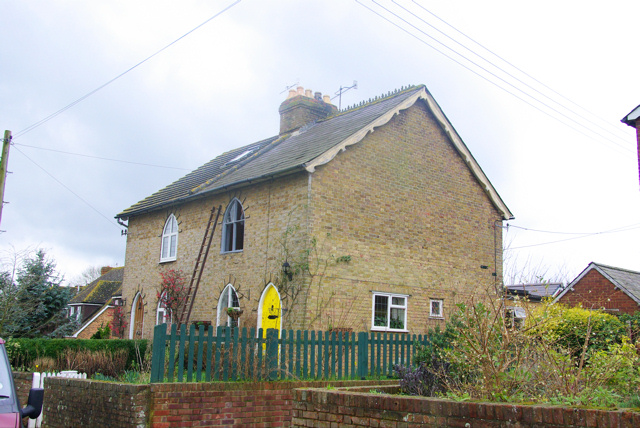
- Cottages on West Street

- Location within Kent
- Population: 702 (2011)
- Civil parish: Hunton
- Shire county: Kent
- Region: South East
- Country: England
- Sovereign state: United Kingdom
- Post town: Maidstone
- Postcode district: ME15
- Police: Kent
- Fire: Kent
- Ambulance: South East Coast
- UK Parliament: Weald of Kent

Hunton is a civil parish and village near the town of Maidstone in Kent, England.

== Toponymy ==
The village's first recorded name was Huntindone in the eleventh century. Its name comes from Old English hunta 'huntsman' and dun 'hill' - 'Hill of the Huntsman'. The parish was frequently referred to in ancient deeds as Huntington. The name change to Hunton suggests tun meaning "village". "Hunton fell within the Hundred of Twyford. Its 19th century Registration District & Poor Law Union was Maidstone."

== History ==
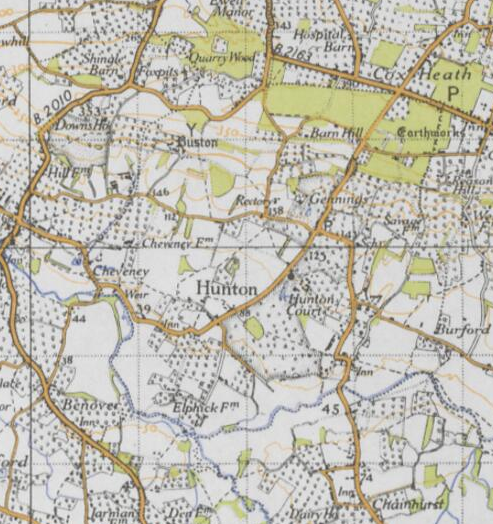
A Map of Hunton, 1945

In the 1870s, Hunton was described like this:

The village stands near the river Beult, 3 miles E by S of Yalding r. station, and 4½ SW by S of Maidstone; was once a market town; and has a post office under Staplehurst. The parish comprises 2,061 acres.

== The village ==
Within the parish there are two schools. Hunton Church of England Primary School, which was built in 1963 and located at Bishops Lane, was rated 'Good' by Ofsted in 2021. The other is Hunton & Linton Pre-School, in the Village Hall. There is also a Language Service based in Hunton, 'Kent Language Services' which provides tuition for business or tourism.

Businesses include a building company, grocers, a gardening company and a pub; 'The White House'.

The village has a ‘Pop Up’ shop, selling produce either grown or made by Hunton residents. The shop consists of a small stall, which is mobile and can change venue, although it tends to be held in the Village Club. The shop opens for a few hours on different dates along with the Pop Up Cafe. There are a few farms in the area that sell fresh produce and monthly markets are held in Yalding and East Farleigh. Milebush Farm Pick Your Own is in the area just west of Hunton which has a fruit and vegetable shop.

There is no longer a post office in Hunton, but there is in the surrounding villages of Yalding, Marden and Coxheath, the village does have three post boxes.

There is a village website from the parish council with links and information about local organisations.

"Hunton Herald" is a local monthly publication with news, articles, events and adverts about Hunton.

== Local points of interest ==
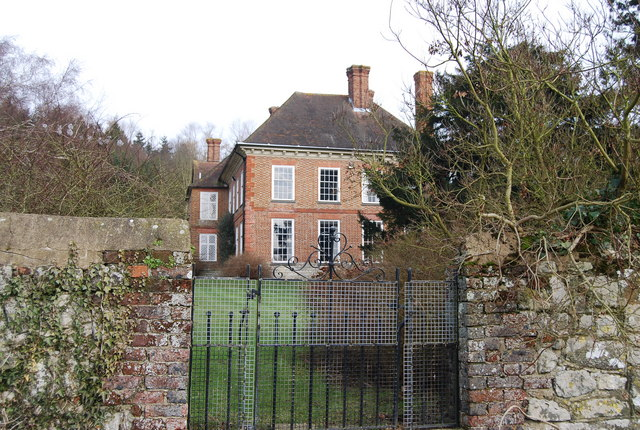
Busty Manor

There are 71 listed buildings in the Parish of Hunton. Four buildings are grade listed II*; Stonewall Farmhouse Mounting Block and Garden Wall to East, Buston Manor, Buston Manor Barn and Granary.

St Mary's Church is located in the village, and is a Grade I listed building.

In 1871 the Liberal politician Henry Campbell-Bannerman inherited the estate of Hunton Lodge or Court Lodge (now Hunton Court) from his wife's uncle, Henry Bannerman, but did not take possession until 1894 on the death of an aunt who was using the mansion. In the meantime, Campbell-Bannerman and his wife used other homes as a country residence, including the nearby house at Gennings Park, living there until 1887. The Lodge/Court was Grade II Listed on 25 July 1952. The property remained in the Bannerman family until 2008. An April 2008 report in The Times stated that the property included "mature parkland peppered with fine trees [and the home] ... which retains the character of a Edwardian stately home. The service courts are highly picturesque, with the stables and coach house in lovely pink and black chequer brick". A report in August 2019, with photographs, indicated that major renovations and modernization had been completed since 2008, "including the restoration and colour-matching of the decorative plasterwork and gilding and the repair and restoration of water-damaged wall murals".

The Hunton Village Club building dates back to the 1800s, originally believed to be a meeting house and school for young ladies and was once owned by the Hunton Court Estate. Today, the club is run by volunteers to hold events for the village and serves drinks.

Hunton Village Hall was built in 1926 and retains many of its original features. The building is used for events such as weddings and parties today. Around 1986 it was reported to be named a "working-men's" club.

== Transport ==
Transport in Hunton consists of a bus route through the village, the 25, 25A, 22 and 26 Nu-Venture buses travel to either Maidstone, Goudhurst or Laddingford

The nearest railway stations are Yalding Paddock Wood and Marden.

== Geography ==
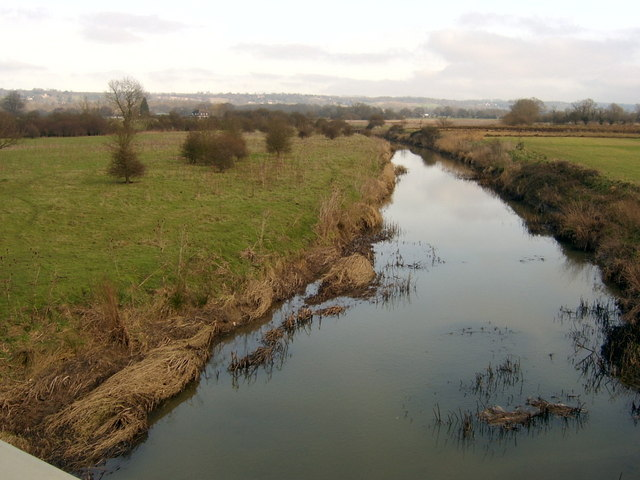
The River Beult

The River Beult runs along the south and west border of Hunton and flows into the River Medway at Yalding.

The physical environment of Hunton is mainly green space and is very rural. There are many farms across the Parish, including Milebush, Bramling Oast Amsbury, Hammonds Cheveney, Willamette Oast Amsbury, Barn Hill and North Park. Many of these farms have Oast Houses, which are common in Kent.

== Housing ==
The total number of houses has increased over time; in 1831 there were 137 recorded, 202 in 1961 and 256 in 2011. Out of 702 residents, 690 were living in households and 12 in communal establishments reported by the 2011 census.

The houses in Benstead Close were originally Council owned but are now private. The type of properties in the area are mainly large detached historical homes and cottages. Next to Hunton CEP School there are almshouses owned by the church.

== Demography ==
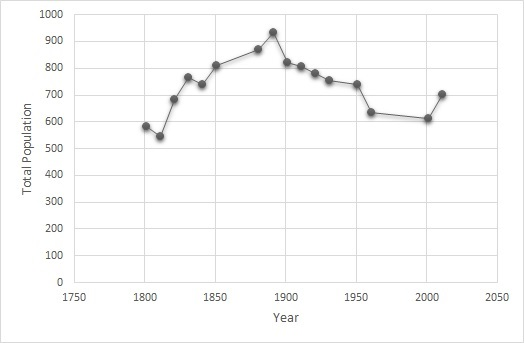
Hunton Civil Parish Population, 1801–2011

=== Population ===
The earliest record of Hunton's population was 582, in 1801. The highest population recorded there was 934 in 1891. The population at the 2011 Census was 702, with 342 males and 359 females in the parish and one legend. The population time series of Hunton shows this fluctuation over 200 years.

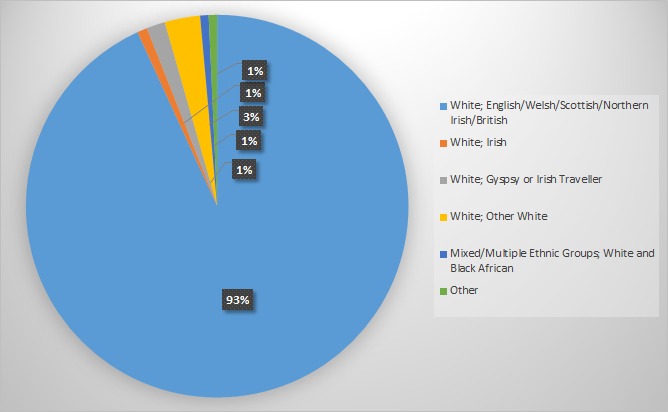
Chart showing Ethnic Groups in Hunton, Kent

=== Ethnicity ===
The 2011 Census reported that out of the total 702 residents, 654 were White; English//Welsh/Scottish/Northern Irish/British, 21 were White; Other White, 11 White; Gypsy/Irish Traveller, 6 White; Irish, 5 Mixed/Multiple Ethnic Groups; White and Black African and 5 Other. For eight other ethnic groups, no residents were recorded.

=== Occupational structure ===
According to 1881 census data, the majority of occupations within the parish were agricultural. The different occupations can be seen in the graph below for both females and males. Many female roles were classed as 'unspecified'.

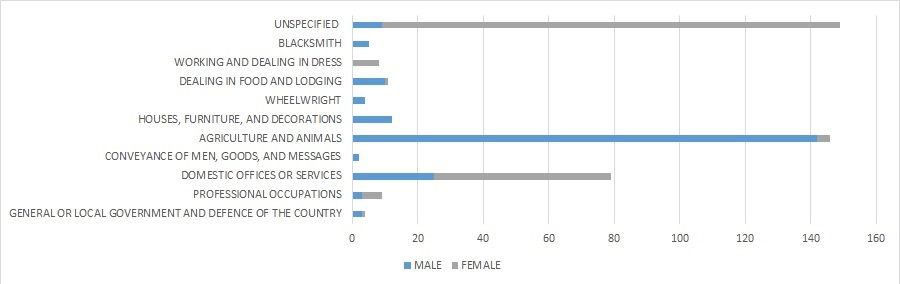
Occupations of Males and Females in Hunton, 1881

The 2011 census data shows occupations are much more diverse and similar in numbers today. Female and male occupations are more alike. Females living in Hunton are mainly in professional or secretarial occupations. The majority of males work in managerial, skilled trades and professional occupations.

Occupations of Males and Females in Hunton, 2011
