= Rag-stone =

Work done with stones that are quarried in thin pieces

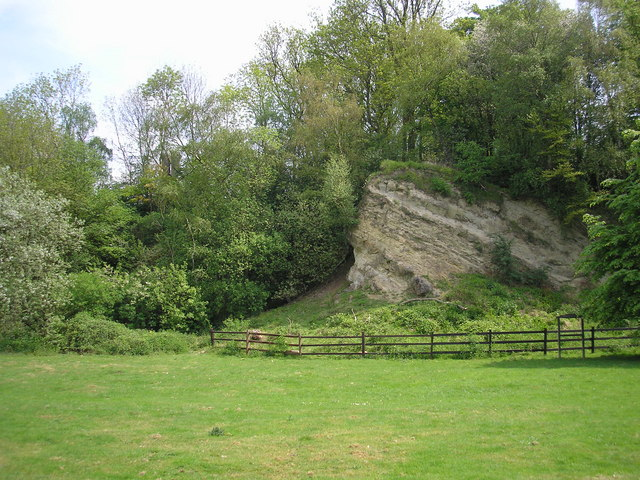
Natural ragstone outcrop in Dryhill Nature Reserve near Sevenoaks, Kent

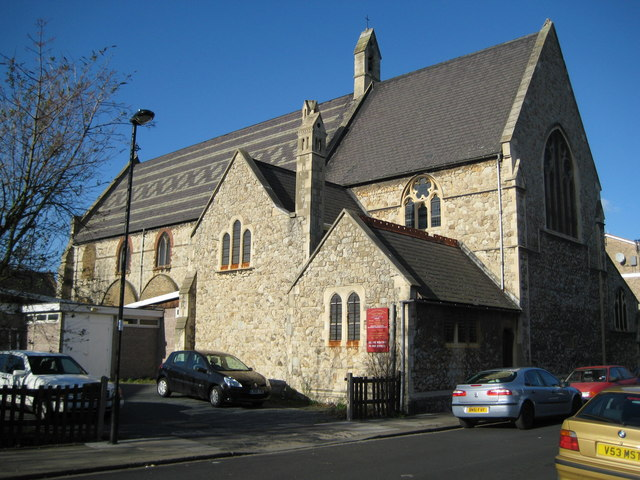
Church made from ragstone in Ponders End, Enfield, London

Rag-stone is a name given by some architectural writers to work done with stones that are quarried in thin pieces, such as Horsham Stone, sandstone, Yorkshire stone, and the slate stones, but this is more properly flag or slab work. Near London, "rag-stone" often means Kentish ragstone, a material from the neighbourhood of Maidstone.

Rag-stone is peculiarly suited for medieval work. It is often laid as uncoursed work, or random work, sometimes as random coursed work and sometimes as regular ashlar. Ragstone, a dull grey stone, is still quarried on an industrial scale close to the Kent Downs AONB. It has traditionally been used within the AONB as a road stone, cobble or sett and a walling block. Although difficult to 'dress' with a regular face, it has been used as rectangular blocks for the construction of walls and buildings and was very popular for the construction of 19th-century churches. More frequently, owing to the difficult and variable nature of the stone, it is seen as irregular and self-faced irregular blocks in walling. Due to its irregular shape, as with flint, ragstone has been set within brick quoins and bands. Spalls, fist-sized irregular chips of ragstone, have been used to surface paths but modern usage of ragstone is as a general construction aggregate, including fill for gabions and loose or partly binding gravels.

== See also ==
- Kentish ragstone, a popular type with an extensive article
- List of types of limestone – Limestone deposits listed by location
