= Fremlin =

Fremlin is a British surname and may refer to:

== People ==
- Alfred Fremlin (1832–1915), Australian politician
- Celia Fremlin (1914–2009), British author
- John H. Fremlin (1913–1995), nuclear physicist

== Other uses ==
- Fremlin's Brewery, a brewery in Maidstone, Kent, England
- Fremlin Walk, an outdoor shopping centre in Maidstone, Kent, England
- Fremlin (Dungeons & Dragons), a creature in Dungeons & Dragons
