= Bieresel =

Legendary creature from German folklore connected with beer

A bieresel (German: Bieresel) ("beer donkey"; sg., pl.; German: [ˈbiːɐ̯ˌeːzl̩]; English mythological literature also offers the corrupted forms Biersal, Bieresal, and Bierasal not found in German literature) is a type of kobold (house spirit) of German folklore.

== General description ==
The bieresel is mentioned in the Die gestriegelte Rockenphilosophie (first published 1705) by apothecary and natural historian Johann Georg Schmidt, where the "bier esel" is described as a devil or kobold taking on a shape of a donkey and drinking beer by night, and seen in many places. (Note: Schmidt (1759, 5th edition), also cited by Ranke (1927) HdA as Rockenphilosophie V, 37.) The term bieresel is attested as an insult dated 1597 in Bürgel. (Note: Gleichenstein, H. B. E. von (1729) Beschreibung von Abtey und Kloster Bürgelin, cited by Eisel.)

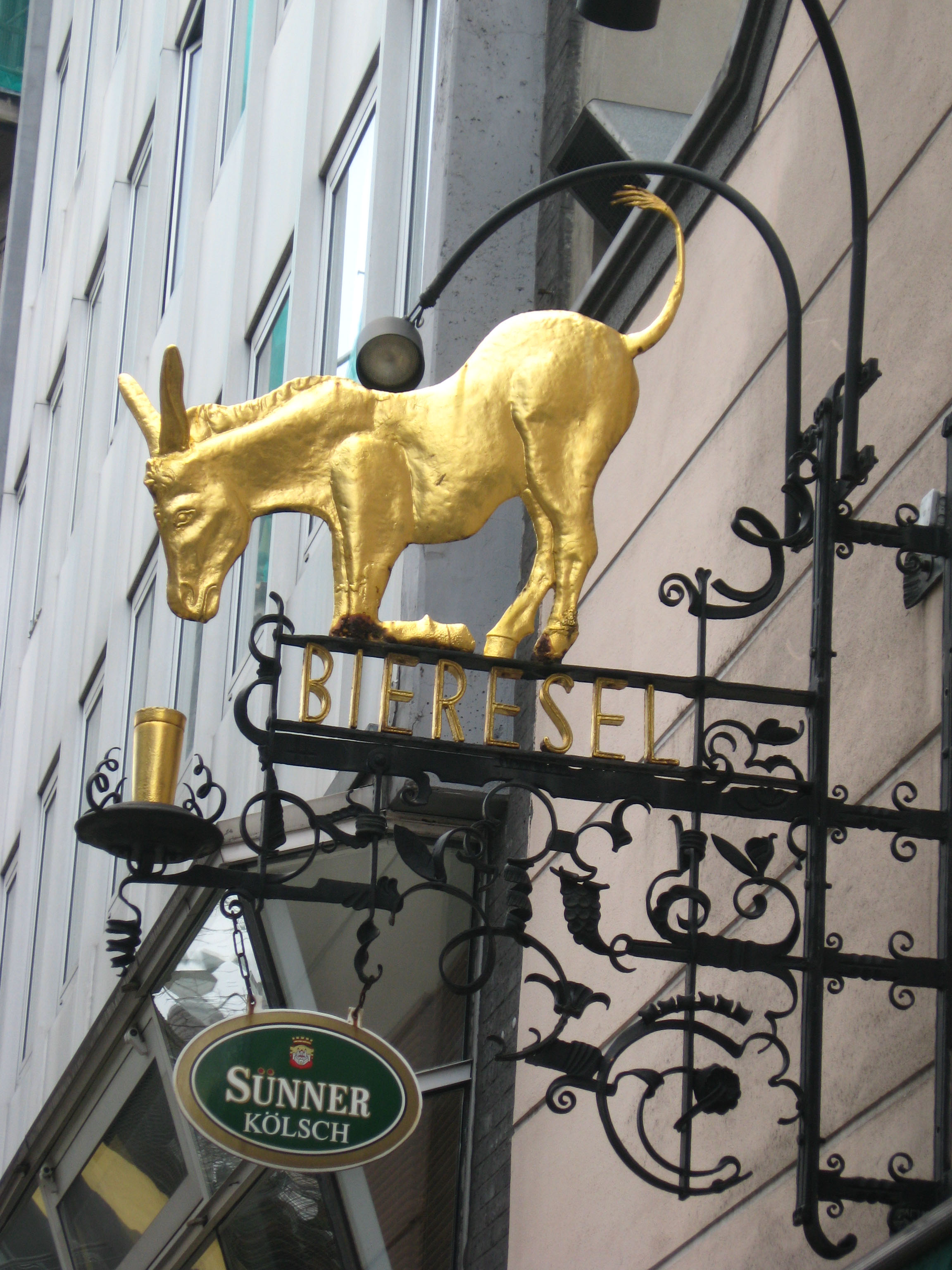
Bieresel as tavern sign

Generally, the bieresel is described as a spirit with donkey legs, sometimes only three, hence the name meaning "beer donkey".

In Ruhla, Thuringia, a bieresel (with the appearance of a three- or four-legged donkey) would roam the streets, and looking for beer-drinkers, reputedly practices "aufhocken" (leaping upon a person’s back and forcing them to carry the aufhocking spirit), its victims being drunkards or tavern visitors returning late at night, usually all the way to the drinker's house door. (Note: Witzschel cited by HdA.) The bieresel in Steinbach is also said to hop on the back of someone who gets drunk at the pub and forces him to carry the spirit; such a tale has been recorded in the Steinbach dialect. (Note: Bechstein (1862), also reprinted in standard German by Grässe (1872), p. 125, citing Bechstein in note 129).) The bieresel is also reputedly found in other parts of Thuringia. (Note: Steinbach between Altenstein and Liebenstein, Thuringia.) (Note: The bieresel is found in "many places (vielen Orten)" according to Bechstein (1858) Thüringer Sagenbuch or (1885) cited by HdA.)

In the Vogtland, when a child laughs loudly, people say he laughs like a bieresel. The bieresel goes into pubs and mingles with the crowd drinking beer, doing no particular harm. But the notion of a bieresel here is different from elsewhere, and Grässe guesses it may not be held to take on the typical three-legged donkey form.

In Grochwitz near Torgau in Saxony, the Bieresel brings beer inside the house like a Drak and also does other household chores like a Kobold. The only reward the Bieresel expects is a glass of beer every evening. If it doesn’t get its beer, then it will break everything. (Note: Kuhn & Schwartz, cited by HdA. Translated by Thorpe.) In Grimma, Saxony, there was a legend of a bieresel dwelling in a cellar under one of the barns standing in row against a high hill. The cellar is connected to the hill, and the bieresel did not tolerate anyone staying overnight. (Note: Meiche Sachsen (1903), after Grässe (1874) [1855] cited by HdA)

There is a tale set in a mill called the Katzenmühle or "Cat-mill" supposedly at Schwanditz near Altenburg, Thuringia, which was a mill haunted by a bieresel, and a portion of beer had to be put out for it each night, until a bear-handler stayed over with his bear, and in an ensuing fight, drove the bieresel out. The spirit later asked the miller if the nasty cats were still around, which is how the mill got its name. (Note: Local given as "Schwednitz" by Grässe.) This tale is identifiable as a variant of the "Schrätel und Wasserbär" type. (Note: Although Taylor only lists Kuhn&Schwartz, No. 225, 1st tale, the 2nd tale is obviously a variant thereof.)

In former German-speaking Bohemia, it is said that unscrupulous barkeepers turn into the bieresel, a noisy Poltergeist monster, and in one of the villages of the Braunau District there was a story of the monster taking occupancy in one of the rooms at a tavern. An encounter was reputed to be deadly. A servant lad who didn't believe it investigated, and apparently having fought with it, was found dead with a broken neck. A girl managed to see it, and described it as a gray ox with a thick red human head which is characterized by giant horns. The girl suffered from swollen face and fever from the encountere, but later recovered to tell her tale. (Note: Kühnau citing Eduard Langer, Das östliche Deutschböhmen. III. Bd. 1903. pp. 20–22; Kühnau cited by HdA.) A farmstead called "Muschick" in Settenz (Řetenice), Teplice was reputedly haunted by a bieresel that was donkey-headed and hooved. It committed all sorts of mischief, throwing and maids out of bed, breaking milk vats and other vessels. Teplice citizens who went to Settenz for beer would be followed back by the spirit, it was said. (Note: Laube, cited by HdA.)

Elsewhere, the biersal is described as a sprite stemming from the Germanic mythology especially of the Saxony region and surviving into modern times in German folklore. This household spirit abides particularly in breweries and in the bierkeller (i.e. beer cellar) of inns and pubs. In these establishments, the Biersal will gladly clean bottles, steins, casks and kegs that have been used in return for payment in the form of his own portion of beer. When not properly remunerated, however, they resort to mischief and vandalism by stealing or hiding tools and causing equipment malfunctions.

== Parallels ==
The bieresel has been compared with the dorftier (lit. "village animal"). (Note: By Kurt Ranke, in the entry under the Handwörterbuch des deutschen Aberglaubens (HdA).) This "dorftier" is regarded as a generic term covers all sorts of animals under various names. but sometimes takes on donkey shape, and in one Swedish example, it is paired with the trottentier ("stomping beast") nightly roaming the streets of Oberflachs (Aargau canton). This trottentier is described more fully as the ghost of a dishonest grape treading oveerseer (German: Trottmeister) who was stealing portions of people's grapes and grape must. Not only does the trottentier make stomping noises around the house, it drinks up the wine from all the tubs and buckets, and when everything is empty of wine, it angrily tosses the vat around with its snout. (Note: In Rochholz's collection, "302. Das Dorfthier in Suhr", pp. 69–70 is about a shoemaker who blew a bottomless glass bottle like an instrument, making odd sounds and nicknamed the village animal, so it is not much of a parallel.)

Another parallel to the bieresel may be the English legend, first appearing in the 19th century, concerning a house spirit named Hodfellow that resided at the Fremlin's Brewery in Maidstone, Kent, England who was wont to either assist the company's workers or hinder their efforts depending on whether he was being paid his share of the beer.

== See also ==
- Kobold
- Gremlin
- Clurichaun
- Machine Elf

== Bibliography ==
- Bächtold-Stäubli, Hanns [in German]; Hoffmann-Krayer, Eduard, eds. (1927–1987) [1927–1941]. Handwörterbuch des Deutschen Aberglaubens. Berlin: Walter de Gruyter. ISBN 3-11-011194-2.
  - Reprint 2000, ISBN 978-3-11-016860-0
  - Band 1 (1927) Aal–Butzemann.
  - Band 2 (1930) C–Frautragen.
- Grässe, Johann Georg Theodor, ed. (1872). Bierstudien: Ernst und Scherz; Geschichte des Bieres und seiner Verbreitung über den Erdball, Bierstatistik, Bieraberglauben, Bierfeste, Bierorden, Bierspiele, Bierlieder aller Zeiten und Völker, Biersprichwörter, Brauergeheimnisse. Dresden: Zahn.
- Kuhn, Adalbert; Schwartz, Wilhelm [in German] (1848). Norddeutsche Sagen, Märchen und Gebräuche: aus Meklenburg, Pommern, der Mark, Sachsen, Thüringen, Braunschweig, Hannover, Oldenburg und Westfalen. Leipzig: F. A. Brockhaus.
