= Natalie O'Connor =

British trampoline gymnast

Natalie Burr (formerly O'Connor) (born 13 August 1982) is a British international athlete who competed in the gymnastic discipline of trampolining.

Born in Maidstone, Kent, O'Connor first represented Great Britain in 1996 at the World Age Games held in Kamloops, Canada. She went on to compete internationally for the next ten years with her greatest achievement being a bronze medal at the European Championships held in St Petersburg, Russia in 2002. In 2005 O'Connor competed for Britain at the World Championships in Eindhoven.

On 24 February 2007 O'Connor suffered a fractured c-spine at C6 - C7 with spinal cord damage following an accident whilst training for the upcoming season. Although disabled, O'Connor is able to walk short distances unaided.
