= Clurichaun =

Mischievous fairy from Irish folklore

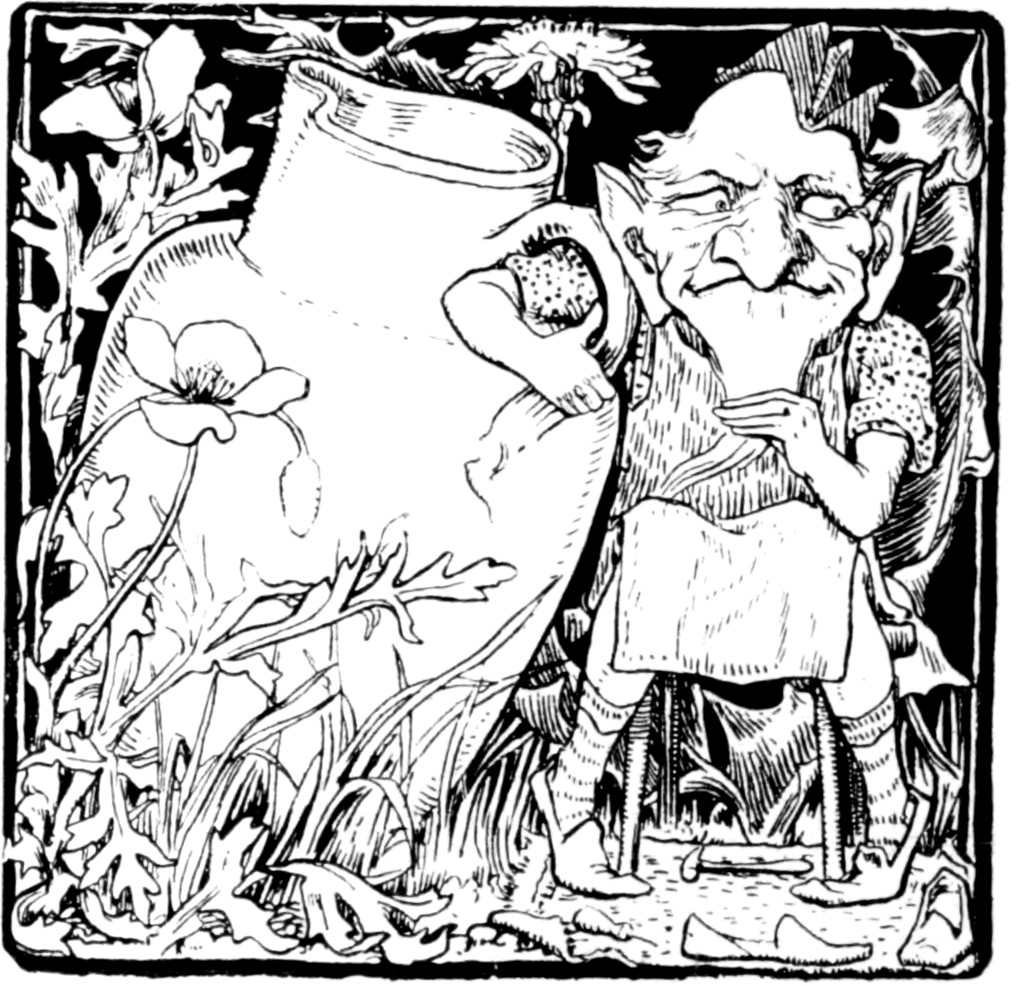
A representation of a Clurichaun in T. C. Croker's Fairy Legends and Traditions of the South of Ireland

The clurichaun (/ˈkluːrɪkɔːn/) or clúrachán (from Irish: clobhair-ceann) is a mischievous fairy in Irish folklore known for his great love of drinking and a tendency to haunt breweries, pubs and wine cellars. He is related to the leprechaun and has sometimes been conflated with him as a shoemaker and a guardian of hidden treasure. This has led some folklorists to suppose that the clurichaun is merely a leprechaun on a drinking spree, while others regard them as regional variations of the same being. Like the leprechaun, the clurichaun is a solitary fairy, encountered alone rather than in groups, as distinct from the trooping fairies.

== Folklore ==
In the folktale "The Haunted Cellar", recorded by Thomas Crofton Croker in 1825, a clurichaun named Naggeneen haunts the wine cellar of an Irish lord, drinking everything in sight and playing frightening pranks on the servants. He is described as a little man measuring 6 in (150 mm) tall, with a face like a withered apple. He has twinkling eyes and a nose that is red and purple from heavy drinking. He wears a red nightcap, a short leather apron, light blue stockings, and shoes with large silver buckles. When he is discovered by the master of the house, Naggeneen talks him out of moving elsewhere by implying that he would simply move with him.

Other descriptions have him wearing red like other solitary fairies.

In another tale, "Master and Man", a young man named Billy Mac Daniel is on his way home one winter night when he is offered a glass of liquor by a clurichaun to warm himself. He takes the drink but when he refuses to pay for it he is compelled by the clurichaun to serve him for seven years and a day. Billy, however, is eventually able to break his servitude by invoking the blessing of God. In this story, the clurichaun is able to pass through keyholes to invade homes and wine cellars and can transform bog rushes into horses to be used as mounts. Clurichauns can also fly through the air on rushes similar to witches and their broomsticks.

Thomas Keightley in his Fairy Mythology (1828) presents the story of a clurichaun named Little Wildbean who was more helpful than others of his kind, but also quick to anger and violence when slighted. He haunted the wine cellar of a Quaker gentleman named Harris, and if one of the servants was negligent enough to leave the beer barrel running then Little Wildbean would wedge himself inside to stop the flow until someone came to turn it off. His dinner was left for him in the cellar, but one night the cook left him nothing but part of a herring and some cold potatoes. At midnight Wildbean dragged the cook out of her bed and all the way down the hard cellar stairs, leaving her battered and bruised so that she was bedridden for three weeks. In a common folktale motif Mr. Harris tried to rid himself of Wildbean by moving elsewhere but decided to turn back when he discovered the clurichaun had moved with him.

The folklorist Nicholas O'Kearney described the clurichaun in 1855 as follows:

The Clobhair-ceann was another being of the same class: he was a jolly, red-faced, drunken little fellow, and was ever found in the cellars of the debauchee, Bacchus-like, astride of the wine-butt with a brimful tankard in hand, drinking and singing away merrily. Any wine cellar known to be haunted by this sprite was doomed to bring its owner to speedy ruin.

Katharine Briggs stated that he was "a kind of buttery spirit, feasting himself in the cellars of drunkards or scaring dishonest servants who steal the wine."

He is also described as a trickster and practical joker, and a disturber of order and quietness in a household, making noise day and night. Despite his often troublesome nature, the clurichaun takes special care of the family to whom he has attached himself, endeavoring to protect their property and lives, provided he is not interfered with. This dual nature makes him similar to the domestic hobgoblin.

Besides his love of drinking, the clurichaun also enjoys pipe smoking, and the small disposable clay pipes known as "fairy pipes" that are often found while digging or plowing are said to belong to him. He also knows the secret of making beer from heather.

Alternate spellings include cluracan, cluracaun, cluricaun, and cluricaune.

== Clurichauns and leprechauns ==
Though generally regarded as separate beings, certain characteristics of the leprechaun have sometimes been merged with those of the clurichaun, particularly as a shoemaker and treasure guardian. The clurichaun is sometimes portrayed carrying a jug of ale or wearing a leather apron with hammer in hand, whistling as he works. He also carries a magical purse (or sometimes a pewter beggars cup) with varying properties. It may contain a shilling (known as the "lucky shilling" or spre na skillenagh) that always returns to the purse no matter how often it is spent, or it may always be full of money, and for this reason mortals will often try to capture the clurichaun. Even if he is caught he has the power to vanish if he can make his captor look away even for an instant. He frequently carries two such purses, one containing the magic shilling and the other containing a normal copper coin, and if captured he will present the latter before vanishing. Like the leprechaun he is sometimes said to have knowledge of hidden treasure and can be forced to reveal its location. In such instances one of his tricks is to create the illusion of multiple treasure markers so that the seeker will not know its exact whereabouts.

The clurichaun also shares many attributes with the biersal, a type of kobold stemming from Germanic mythology and surviving into modern times in German folklore.

== Literature ==
A clurichaun named Kweequel is a prominent character in the first story of the book Four Different Faces by C.J. Cala.

The clurichaun appears as a regular character (under the name Cluracan) in Neil Gaiman's acclaimed comic series The Sandman and its spin-off series The Dreaming. Cluracan continues the tradition of constant drunkenness but is portrayed as a tall, elegant blond fairy, although this is likely due to use of magic "glamour," such as that used by his sister, Nuala, and his true appearance would then be left unknown.

The clurichaun Naggeneen ("a little drink") magically associates himself with "Mary's Place", the successor to Callahan's Bar in Spider Robinson's stories. The word is spelled 'cluricaune' there. 'Naggeneen' is used in place of his true name which is unwise for magical beings to reveal. Naggeneen saves the bar from bankruptcy through his ability to drink tremendous quantities of alcohol—and to pay for it honestly.

The Fairyland series has a clurichaun named Gratchling Gourdborne Goldmouth, though he is completely unlike a typical clurichaun, being a massive and extremely violent savage.

The comic strip "Arlo and Janis" for March 17, 2010 has a clurichaun at the couple's door. Arlo greets him with a grin:
"Faith an' begorra! 'Tis St. Patrick's Day, and here comes a leprechaun!"
The caller, about half Arlo's height and with comic-strip "bubbles" in front of his scowling face to denote drunkenness, answers:
"Actually, I'm a clurichaun."
Arlo: "A...what?"
Clurichaun: "I'm like a leprechaun, but meaner... And given half a chance, I'll drink all your wine!"
Arlo: "Oy vey! Even if I'm not Irish?!"

In Dorothy Dunnett's novel Queens' Play, Lymond "erroneously" uses the name "O'Cluricaun" to intentionally insult Cormac O'Connor (see page 361).

The clurichauns appear as enemies in the first volume of Dungeon Crawler Carl. They manufacture alcohol and drop it as loot when killed.

== See also ==
- Bieresel
- Far darrig
- Household deity
- Kobold
