= Listed buildings in Maidstone =

Historic structures in Kent, England

Maidstone is a town and civil parish in the Borough of Maidstone of Kent, England. It contains five grade I, 23 grade II*, 268 grade II listed buildings that are recorded in the National Heritage List for England.

This list is based on the information retrieved online from Historic England

== Key ==
| Grade | Criteria |
|---|---|
| I | Buildings that are of exceptional interest |
| II* | Particularly important buildings of more than special interest |
| II | Buildings that are of special interest |

== Listing ==
| Name | Grade | Location | Type | Completed (Note: The date given is the date used by Historic England as significant for the initial building or that of an important part in the structure's description.) | Date designated | Grid ref. (Note: The grid reference is based on the British national grid reference system, sometimes known as OSGB36, used by the Ordnance Survey.) Geo-coordinates | Notes | Entry number (Note: The "List Entry Number" is a unique number assigned to each listed building and scheduled monument by Historic England.) | Image | Wikidata |
|---|---|---|---|---|---|---|---|---|---|---|
| 7, Albion Place | II | 7, Albion Place | | | 2 August 1974 | TQ7652255793; 51°16′26″N 0°31′45″E | | 1086378 | Upload Photo | Q26376973 |
| 9, Albion Place | II | 9, Albion Place | | | 2 August 1974 | TQ7652655801; 51°16′26″N 0°31′46″E | | 1336192 | Upload Photo | Q26620709 |
| 11, Albion Place | II | 11, Albion Place | | | 2 August 1974 | TQ7652955809; 51°16′27″N 0°31′46″E | | 1086379 | Upload Photo | Q26376980 |
| 15 and 17, Albion Place | II | 15 and 17, Albion Place | | | 2 August 1974 | TQ7653955825; 51°16′27″N 0°31′46″E | | 1086380 | Upload Photo | Q26376987 |
| 19 and 21, Albion Place | II | 19 and 21, Albion Place | | | 26 March 1974 | TQ7654655838; 51°16′28″N 0°31′47″E | | 1336193 | Upload Photo | Q26620710 |
| Gibraltar House | II | Allington, Riverside | | | 30 July 1951 | TQ7535357763; 51°17′31″N 0°30′49″E | | 1086272 | Upload Photo | Q26376487 |
| Former Drying Loft at Turkey Mills | II | Ashford Road | | | 2 August 1974 | TQ7721655502; 51°16′16″N 0°32′21″E | | 1336195 | Upload Photo | Q26620712 |
| Industrial Building Adjoining Former Drying Loft at Turkey Mill to the West | II | Ashford Road | | | 2 August 1974 | TQ7720755500; 51°16′16″N 0°32′20″E | | 1086390 | Upload Photo | Q26377038 |
| Raigersfeld | II | Ashford Road | | | 30 July 1951 | TQ7790955449; 51°16′14″N 0°32′56″E | | 1239003 | Upload Photo | Q26532025 |
| Turkey Court | II* | Ashford Road | | | 30 July 1951 | TQ7719455535; 51°16′17″N 0°32′20″E | | 1238987 | Upload Photo | Q17545241 |
| 1 and 3, Ashford Road | II | 1 and 3, Ashford Road | | | 30 July 1951 | TQ7652855735; 51°16′24″N 0°31′46″E | | 1086381 | Upload Photo | Q26376990 |
| 4b and 6, Ashford Road | II | 4b and 6, Ashford Road | | | 2 August 1974 | TQ7657655690; 51°16′23″N 0°31′48″E | | 1238949 | Upload Photo | Q26531977 |
| 7, Ashford Road | II | 7, Ashford Road | | | 17 August 1973 | TQ7656655726; 51°16′24″N 0°31′48″E | | 1086382 | Upload Photo | Q26376996 |
| 9, Ashford Road | II | 9, Ashford Road | | | 17 August 1973 | TQ7658055726; 51°16′24″N 0°31′48″E | | 1086383 | Upload Photo | Q26377002 |
| 11, Ashford Road | II | 11, Ashford Road | | | 17 August 1973 | TQ7659255731; 51°16′24″N 0°31′49″E | | 1086384 | Upload Photo | Q26377007 |
| 13 and 15, Ashford Road | II | 13 and 15, Ashford Road | | | 2 August 1974 | TQ7661755747; 51°16′25″N 0°31′50″E | | 1086385 | Upload Photo | Q26377012 |
| 24, Ashford Road | II | 24, Ashford Road | | | 2 August 1974 | TQ7664655709; 51°16′23″N 0°31′52″E | | 1086389 | Upload Photo | Q26377034 |
| 27, Ashford Road | II | 27, Ashford Road | | | 2 August 1974 | TQ7692155793; 51°16′26″N 0°32′06″E | | 1086386 | Upload Photo | Q26377016 |
| 29-33, Ashford Road | II | 29-33, Ashford Road | | | 2 August 1974 | TQ7692955787; 51°16′26″N 0°32′06″E | | 1086387 | Upload Photo | Q26377022 |
| 35, Ashford Road | II | 35, Ashford Road | | | 2 August 1974 | TQ7693755778; 51°16′25″N 0°32′07″E | | 1273958 | Upload Photo | Q26563656 |
| 69, Bank Street | II | 69, Bank Street | | | 2 August 1974 | TQ7594155640; 51°16′22″N 0°31′15″E | | 1336177 | Upload Photo | Q26620694 |
| 70, Bank Street | II | 70, Bank Street | | | 30 July 1951 | TQ7594955643; 51°16′22″N 0°31′16″E | | 1336178 | Upload Photo | Q26620695 |
| 74 and 75, Bank Street | II | 74 and 75, Bank Street | | | 2 August 1974 | TQ7597555660; 51°16′22″N 0°31′17″E | | 1224407 | Upload Photo | Q26518592 |
| 76 and 77, Bank Street | II | 76 and 77, Bank Street | | | 2 August 1974 | TQ7598155664; 51°16′23″N 0°31′17″E | | 1086355 | Upload Photo | Q26376871 |
| 78, Bank Street | II* | 78, Bank Street | | | 30 July 1951 | TQ7598855669; 51°16′23″N 0°31′18″E | | 1266847 | 78, Bank Street More images | Q17545324 |
| 79-81, Bank Street | II | 79-81, Bank Street | | | 30 July 1951 | TQ7599655676; 51°16′23″N 0°31′18″E | | 1086356 | Upload Photo | Q26376876 |
| 82, Bank Street | II | 82, Bank Street | | | 30 July 1951 | TQ7600455680; 51°16′23″N 0°31′19″E | | 1336179 | Upload Photo | Q26620696 |
| 83 and 84, Bank Street | II | 83 and 84, Bank Street | | | 30 July 1951 | TQ7601155684; 51°16′23″N 0°31′19″E | | 1224441 | Upload Photo | Q26518622 |
| 85, Bank Street | II* | 85, Bank Street | | | 30 July 1951 | TQ7601755688; 51°16′23″N 0°31′19″E | | 1086357 | Upload Photo | Q17545150 |
| 86, Bank Street | II | 86, Bank Street | | | 30 July 1951 | TQ7602155690; 51°16′23″N 0°31′19″E | | 1336180 | Upload Photo | Q26620697 |
| 87 and 88, Bank Street | II | 87 and 88, Bank Street | | | 2 August 1974 | TQ7603155696; 51°16′24″N 0°31′20″E | | 1086317 | Upload Photo | Q26376676 |
| 89, Bank Street | II | 89, Bank Street | | | 23 May 2001 | TQ7604155703; 51°16′24″N 0°31′21″E | | 1271515 | Upload Photo | Q26561458 |
| Rock House | II | 1, Bedford Place | | | 2 August 1974 | TQ7534355577; 51°16′21″N 0°30′44″E | | 1086328 | Upload Photo | Q26376733 |
| 3, Bedford Place | II | 3, Bedford Place | | | 30 July 1951 | TQ7530655576; 51°16′21″N 0°30′42″E | | 1336156 | Upload Photo | Q26620674 |
| 4-7, Bedford Place | II | 4-7, Bedford Place | | | 2 August 1974 | TQ7528455570; 51°16′20″N 0°30′41″E | | 1273912 | Upload Photo | Q26563616 |
| 1-6, Bower Terrace | II | 1-6, Bower Terrace, Tonbridge Road | | | 2 August 1974 | TQ7536855336; 51°16′13″N 0°30′45″E | | 1086291 | Upload Photo | Q26376575 |
| Chapel of the Good Shepherd at Maidstone Prison | II | Boxley Road | | | 2 August 1974 | TQ7612056374; 51°16′45″N 0°31′26″E | | 1336159 | Upload Photo | Q26620677 |
| Roman Catholic Chapel at Maidstone Prison | II | Boxley Road | | | 26 July 1973 | TQ7611156266; 51°16′42″N 0°31′25″E | | 1086394 | Upload Photo | Q26377061 |
| Store and Garden Tools Building at Maidstone Prison | II | Boxley Road | | | 26 July 1973 | TQ7619156263; 51°16′42″N 0°31′29″E | | 1239069 | Upload Photo | Q26532091 |
| The Old Sessions House | II | Boxley Road | | | 26 July 1973 | TQ7601756294; 51°16′43″N 0°31′20″E | | 1086392 | Upload Photo | Q26377050 |
| The Rotunda at Maidstone Prison | II | Boxley Road | | | 26 July 1973 | TQ7612656279; 51°16′42″N 0°31′26″E | | 1273893 | Upload Photo | Q26563599 |
| The Roundhouse at Maidstone Prison | II | Boxley Road | | | 26 July 1973 | TQ7607256338; 51°16′44″N 0°31′23″E | | 1336157 | Upload Photo | Q26620675 |
| Theatre at Maidstone Prison | II | Boxley Road | | | 26 July 1973 | TQ7613956261; 51°16′42″N 0°31′27″E | | 1336158 | Upload Photo | Q26620676 |
| Wall and Main Entrance to Maidstone Prison | II | Boxley Road | | | 26 July 1973 | TQ7594456413; 51°16′47″N 0°31′17″E | | 1239035 | Upload Photo | Q26532058 |
| Weald House at Maidstone Prison | II | Boxley Road | | | 26 July 1973 | TQ7609756312; 51°16′43″N 0°31′24″E | | 1086393 | Upload Photo | Q26377056 |
| Temple House | II | 257, Boxley Road | | | 2 August 1974 | TQ7636356894; 51°17′02″N 0°31′39″E | | 1086391 | Upload Photo | Q26377045 |
| Finial from the House of Commons Debating Chamber | II | Brenchley Gardens | | | 2 August 1974 | TQ7587756110; 51°16′37″N 0°31′13″E | | 1086396 | Upload Photo | Q26377067 |
| Statue Set on Stone Plinth | II | Brenchley Gardens | | | 2 August 1974 | TQ7585456099; 51°16′37″N 0°31′12″E | | 1273877 | Upload Photo | Q26563584 |
| The Old Water Conduit | II | Brenchley Gardens | | | 30 July 1951 | TQ7582856120; 51°16′38″N 0°31′10″E | | 1273902 | Upload Photo | Q26563607 |
| Barn to North West of Little Buckland Farmhouse | II | Buckland Lane | | | 2 August 1974 | TQ7500256787; 51°17′00″N 0°30′29″E | | 1239141 | Upload Photo | Q26532153 |
| Little Buckland Farm Cottage | II* | Buckland Lane | | | 30 July 1951 | TQ7507456732; 51°16′58″N 0°30′32″E | | 1086397 | Upload Photo | Q17545170 |
| Little Buckland Farmhouse | II | Buckland Lane | | | 2 August 1974 | TQ7504756795; 51°17′00″N 0°30′31″E | | 1336161 | Upload Photo | Q26620679 |
| Little Buckland Cottage | II | 12, Buckland Lane | | | 30 July 1951 | TQ7495356689; 51°16′57″N 0°30′26″E | | 1273878 | Upload Photo | Q26563585 |
| 4 and 6 Buckland Road, Maidstone | II | 4, and 6 Buckland Road, ME16 0SL | | | 2 August 1974 | TQ7552555625; 51°16′22″N 0°30′54″E | | 1239143 | Upload Photo | Q26532155 |
| 8, Buckland Road | II | 8, Buckland Road | | | 2 August 1974 | TQ7553155639; 51°16′22″N 0°30′54″E | | 1336162 | Upload Photo | Q26620680 |
| Allington Castle | I | Castle Road, Allington | | | 30 July 1951 | TQ7522157907; 51°17′36″N 0°30′42″E | | 1239149 | Upload Photo | Q4732691 |
| Barn to the North West of Allington Castle | II | Castle Road, Allington | | | 2 August 1974 | TQ7505957957; 51°17′38″N 0°30′34″E | | 1336181 | Upload Photo | Q26620698 |
| Dovecote to the East of Allington Castle | II | Castle Road, Allington | | | 30 July 1951 | TQ7523857952; 51°17′37″N 0°30′43″E | | 1086358 | Upload Photo | Q26376881 |
| Dovecote to the West of Allington Castle | II | Castle Road | | | 30 July 1951 | TQ7512757922; 51°17′37″N 0°30′37″E | | 1086359 | Upload Photo | Q26376887 |
| Former Church of St Lawrence | II | Castle Road | | | 30 July 1951 | TQ7482157783; 51°17′32″N 0°30′21″E | | 1086399 | Upload Photo | Q26377073 |
| Lock House | II | Castle Road | | | 22 September 2006 | TQ7470458111; 51°17′43″N 0°30′16″E | | 1391757 | Upload Photo | Q26671109 |
| Park House | II* | Chatham Road | | | 2 August 1974 | TQ7587757468; 51°17′21″N 0°31′15″E | | 1086363 | Upload Photo | Q17545160 |
| Springfield | II | Chatham Road | | | 2 August 1974 | TQ7555956927; 51°17′04″N 0°30′58″E | | 1086361 | Upload Photo | Q26376898 |
| The Old Farmhouse | II* | Chatham Road | | | 2 August 1974 | TQ7558057836; 51°17′33″N 0°31′01″E | | 1086362 | Upload Photo | Q17545155 |
| Opthalmic Hospital | II | Church Street | | | 2 August 1974 | TQ7621055917; 51°16′31″N 0°31′30″E | | 1086365 | Upload Photo | Q26376908 |
| Clarendon Place | II | 1-7, Church Street | | | 2 August 1974 | TQ7648555736; 51°16′24″N 0°31′43″E | | 1086320 | Upload Photo | Q26376693 |
| The College Gateway (all Saints Parish Room) and the College Tower | I | College Road | | | 30 July 1951 | TQ7602155371; 51°16′13″N 0°31′19″E | | 1336234 | The College Gateway (all Saints Parish Room) and the College Tower More images | Q26263511 |
| The Master's Tower | II | College Road, ME15 6YF | | | 30 July 1951 | TQ7603355321; 51°16′11″N 0°31′19″E | | 1086312 | The Master's Tower More images | Q26376655 |
| Cutbush Almshouses | II | 2-36, College Road, ME15 6YF | | | 2 August 1974 | TQ7604055283; 51°16′10″N 0°31′20″E | | 1266502 | Upload Photo | Q26556990 |
| The Masters House | II* | College Street, ME15 6YQ | | | 30 July 1951 | TQ7600955346; 51°16′12″N 0°31′18″E | | 1225072 | The Masters House More images | Q26268196 |
| Corrall's Charity Almshouses | II | 1-6, College Walk | | | 2 August 1974 | TQ7612355152; 51°16′06″N 0°31′24″E | | 1086366 | Upload Photo | Q26376913 |
| The Corpus Christi Hall | II* | Earl Street | | | 30 July 1951 | TQ7583055804; 51°16′27″N 0°31′10″E | | 1086371 | The Corpus Christi Hall More images | Q17545165 |
| The Market House Public House | II | Earl Street | | | 2 August 1974 | TQ7597055886; 51°16′30″N 0°31′17″E | | 1222669 | Upload Photo | Q26516986 |
| 13, 13a and 15, Earl Street | II | 13, 13a and 15, Earl Street | | | 2 August 1974 | TQ7602055875; 51°16′29″N 0°31′20″E | | 1239400 | Upload Photo | Q26532377 |
| 21 and 23, Earl Street | II | 21 and 23, Earl Street | | | 2 August 1974 | TQ7598555864; 51°16′29″N 0°31′18″E | | 1086370 | Upload Photo | Q26376935 |
| 32, Earl Street | II | 32, Earl Street | | | 3 February 1989 | TQ7596355884; 51°16′30″N 0°31′17″E | | 1266219 | Upload Photo | Q26556730 |
| 33, Earl Street | II | 33, Earl Street | | | 30 July 1951 | TQ7593255839; 51°16′28″N 0°31′15″E | | 1336185 | Upload Photo | Q26620702 |
| 36 and 38, Earl Street | II | 36 and 38, Earl Street | | | 30 July 1951 | TQ7595355880; 51°16′30″N 0°31′16″E | | 1336186 | Upload Photo | Q26620703 |
| 42 and 44, Earl Street | II | 42 and 44, Earl Street | | | 2 August 1974 | TQ7593655872; 51°16′29″N 0°31′15″E | | 1086372 | Upload Photo | Q26376939 |
| 45 and 47, Earl Street | II | 45 and 47, Earl Street | | | 30 July 1951 | TQ7585455819; 51°16′28″N 0°31′11″E | | 1239886 | Upload Photo | Q26532832 |
| 66, Earl Street | II | 66, Earl Street, ME14 1PS | | | 2 August 1974 | TQ7584855840; 51°16′28″N 0°31′11″E | | 1222694 | Upload Photo | Q26517009 |
| Wall Formerly to Corpus Christi Hall Along East Side of Fairmeadow | II | Fairmeadow | | | 2 August 1974 | TQ7579955780; 51°16′27″N 0°31′08″E | | 1336187 | Upload Photo | Q26620704 |
| Drakes Cork and Cask | II | 9, Fairmeadow, ME14 1JP | | | 2 August 1974 | TQ7578955672; 51°16′23″N 0°31′07″E | | 1222736 | Drakes Cork and Cask More images | Q26517044 |
| Pavement and Embankment Wall Outside Nos 60 and 62 | II | Faith Street | | | 2 August 1974 | TQ7578655943; 51°16′32″N 0°31′08″E | | 1336190 | Upload Photo | Q26620707 |
| Wall and Gatepiers to Rear of Chillington House | II | Faith Street | | | 2 August 1974 | TQ7588156032; 51°16′35″N 0°31′13″E | | 1086375 | Upload Photo | Q26376955 |
| 2 Columns from St Faith's Chapel Boxley and One Column from Boxley Abbey, Faith Street | II | 2 Columns From St Faith's Chapel Boxley And One Column From Boxley Abbey, Faith Street | | | 2 August 1974 | TQ7587756030; 51°16′35″N 0°31′13″E | | 1086376 | Upload Photo | Q26376962 |
| Fant House | II | Fant Lane | | | 30 July 1951 | TQ7428154527; 51°15′48″N 0°29′48″E | | 1267545 | Upload Photo | Q26557935 |
| Oasthouse at Fant Farm to South of Fant House | II | Fant Lane | | | 2 August 1974 | TQ7422854444; 51°15′45″N 0°29′45″E | | 1336191 | Upload Photo | Q26620708 |
| Wall to the North East of Fant House | II | Fant Lane | | | 2 August 1974 | TQ7430654539; 51°15′48″N 0°29′49″E | | 1086377 | Upload Photo | Q26376967 |
| Holly Bush | II | 38, Fisher Street, ME14 2SU | | | 2 August 1974 | TQ7602556679; 51°16′55″N 0°31′21″E | | 1086338 | Holly Bush More images | Q26376781 |
| 99 and 100, Gabriel's Hil | II | 99 and 100, Gabriel's Hil | | | 30 July 1951 | TQ7609655747; 51°16′25″N 0°31′23″E | | 1336200 | Upload Photo | Q26620717 |
| 1 and 3, Gabriel's Hill | II | 1 and 3, Gabriel's Hill | | | 2 August 1974 | TQ7611655757; 51°16′25″N 0°31′24″E | | 1336209 | Upload Photo | Q26620726 |
| 4 and 6, Gabriel's Hill | II | 4 and 6, Gabriel's Hill | | | 2 August 1974 | TQ7610255738; 51°16′25″N 0°31′24″E | | 1086341 | Upload Photo | Q26376798 |
| 5 and 7, Gabriel's Hill | II | 5 and 7, Gabriel's Hill | | | 2 August 1974 | TQ7611955746; 51°16′25″N 0°31′25″E | | 1086339 | Upload Photo | Q26376787 |
| 8-12, Gabriel's Hill | II | 8-12, Gabriel's Hill | | | 2 August 1974 | TQ7610955725; 51°16′24″N 0°31′24″E | | 1086342 | Upload Photo | Q26376802 |
| 9 Gabriel's Hill, Maidstone | II | 9, Gabriel's Hill, ME15 6HL | | | 2 August 1974 | TQ7612555736; 51°16′25″N 0°31′25″E | | 1336210 | Upload Photo | Q26620727 |
| 11-15, Gabriel's Hill | II | 11-15, Gabriel's Hill | | | 2 August 1974 | TQ7613455726; 51°16′24″N 0°31′25″E | | 1336211 | Upload Photo | Q26620728 |
| 14, Gabriel's Hill | II | 14, Gabriel's Hill | | | 2 August 1974 | TQ7611355718; 51°16′24″N 0°31′24″E | | 1086343 | Upload Photo | Q26376808 |
| 16 and 18, Gabriel's Hill | II | 16 and 18, Gabriel's Hill | | | 2 August 1974 | TQ7611755711; 51°16′24″N 0°31′24″E | | 1086344 | Upload Photo | Q26376814 |
| 20, Gabriel's Hill | II | 20, Gabriel's Hill | | | 2 August 1974 | TQ7612055703; 51°16′24″N 0°31′25″E | | 1086345 | Upload Photo | Q26376818 |
| 25, 25a and 25b, Gabriel's Hill | II | 25, 25a and 25b, Gabriel's Hill | | | 26 March 1990 | TQ7615255695; 51°16′23″N 0°31′26″E | | 1225743 | Upload Photo | Q26519810 |
| 27, Gabriel's Hill | II | 27, Gabriel's Hill | | | 26 March 1990 | TQ7615455688; 51°16′23″N 0°31′26″E | | 1225746 | Upload Photo | Q26519813 |
| 29 and 31, Gabriel's Hill | II | 29 and 31, Gabriel's Hill | | | 2 August 1974 | TQ7615955680; 51°16′23″N 0°31′27″E | | 1086340 | Upload Photo | Q26376793 |
| 33 Gabriels Hill, Maidstone | II | 33, Gabriels Hill, ME15 6HX | | | 13 December 1989 | TQ7616555673; 51°16′23″N 0°31′27″E | | 1266220 | Upload Photo | Q26556731 |
| Royal Albion | II | 19-23, Havock Lane, ME14 1QE | | | 30 July 1951 | TQ7586955950; 51°16′32″N 0°31′12″E | | 1086347 | Upload Photo | Q26376829 |
| Cannon on Plinth Opposite No 64 | II | High Street | | | 2 August 1974 | TQ7589955642; 51°16′22″N 0°31′13″E | | 1224372 | Upload Photo | Q26518560 |
| Queen Victoria Statue and Drinking Fountain Opposite No 98 | II | High Street | | | 2 August 1974 | TQ7608055759; 51°16′26″N 0°31′23″E | | 1086318 | Upload Photo | Q26376681 |
| 1, High Street | II | 1, High Street | | | 2 August 1974 | TQ7608155783; 51°16′26″N 0°31′23″E | | 1336212 | Upload Photo | Q26620729 |
| National Westminster Bank | II | 3, High Street | | | 2 August 1974 | TQ7606555776; 51°16′26″N 0°31′22″E | | 1267425 | Upload Photo | Q26557823 |
| 5 and 6, High Street | II | 5 and 6, High Street | | | 2 August 1974 | TQ7604955768; 51°16′26″N 0°31′21″E | | 1086348 | Upload Photo | Q26376835 |
| 7, High Street | II | 7, High Street | | | 2 August 1974 | TQ7604355764; 51°16′26″N 0°31′21″E | | 1086349 | Upload Photo | Q26376841 |
| 8 and 9, High Street | II* | 8 and 9, High Street | | | 30 July 1951 | TQ7603255757; 51°16′26″N 0°31′20″E | | 1223181 | 8 and 9, High Street More images | Q17545228 |
| 12, High Street | II | 12, High Street | | | 2 August 1974 | TQ7600555741; 51°16′25″N 0°31′19″E | | 1336213 | Upload Photo | Q26620730 |
| 13, High Street | II | 13, High Street | | | 2 August 1974 | TQ7599955737; 51°16′25″N 0°31′18″E | | 1223200 | Upload Photo | Q26517475 |
| 14, High Street | II | 14, High Street | | | 2 August 1974 | TQ7599455734; 51°16′25″N 0°31′18″E | | 1086350 | Upload Photo | Q26376846 |
| The Royal Star Hotel | II | 15-17, High Street | | | 30 July 1951 | TQ7598055727; 51°16′25″N 0°31′17″E | | 1336214 | Upload Photo | Q26620731 |
| Former London and County Bank | II | 18, High Street | | | 15 July 2009 | TQ7596655716; 51°16′24″N 0°31′17″E | | 1393379 | Upload Photo | Q26672546 |
| 31, High Street | II | 31, High Street | | | 2 August 1974 | TQ7588655661; 51°16′23″N 0°31′12″E | | 1223207 | Upload Photo | Q26517482 |
| 32, High Street | II | 32, High Street | | | 2 August 1974 | TQ7588355657; 51°16′23″N 0°31′12″E | | 1086351 | Upload Photo | Q26376851 |
| 33, High Street | II | 33, High Street | | | 2 August 1974 | TQ7587855655; 51°16′22″N 0°31′12″E | | 1086352 | Upload Photo | Q26376855 |
| 35, High Street | II | 35, High Street | | | 21 September 1993 | TQ7586855649; 51°16′22″N 0°31′11″E | | 1266222 | Upload Photo | Q26556733 |
| 38, High Street | II | 38, High Street | | | 2 August 1974 | TQ7584855636; 51°16′22″N 0°31′10″E | | 1267419 | Upload Photo | Q26557817 |
| 39, High Street | II | 39, High Street | | | 2 August 1974 | TQ7584455633; 51°16′22″N 0°31′10″E | | 1336215 | Upload Photo | Q26620732 |
| 55, High Street | II | 55, High Street | | | 2 August 1974 | TQ7583455586; 51°16′20″N 0°31′10″E | | 1223227 | Upload Photo | Q26517501 |
| 56, High Street | II | 56, High Street | | | 2 August 1974 | TQ7584255590; 51°16′20″N 0°31′10″E | | 1086353 | Upload Photo | Q26376860 |
| 57, High Street | II | 57, High Street | | | 2 August 1974 | TQ7584755593; 51°16′20″N 0°31′10″E | | 1336176 | Upload Photo | Q26620693 |
| 64, High Street | II | 64, High Street | | | 2 August 1974 | TQ7590955626; 51°16′21″N 0°31′14″E | | 1086354 | Upload Photo | Q26376866 |
| 91, High Street | II | 91, High Street, ME14 1SA | | | 23 May 2001 | TQ7605355710; 51°16′24″N 0°31′21″E | | 1271516 | Upload Photo | Q26561459 |
| 93-95, High Street | II | 93-95, High Street, ME14 1SA | | | 2 August 1974 | TQ7607155729; 51°16′25″N 0°31′22″E | | 1336198 | Upload Photo | Q26620715 |
| 97a and 98, High Street | II | 97a and 98, High Street | | | 2 August 1974 | TQ7608655740; 51°16′25″N 0°31′23″E | | 1336199 | Upload Photo | Q26620716 |
| 2 and 4, King Street | II | 2 and 4, King Street | | | 2 August 1974 | TQ7612255760; 51°16′26″N 0°31′25″E | | 1086321 | Upload Photo | Q26376698 |
| 20 and 22, King Street | II | 20 and 22, King Street | | | 2 August 1974 | TQ7618355757; 51°16′25″N 0°31′28″E | | 1086322 | Upload Photo | Q26376703 |
| 24 and 26, King Street | II | 24 and 26, King Street | | | 2 August 1974 | TQ7619455756; 51°16′25″N 0°31′28″E | | 1086323 | Upload Photo | Q26376708 |
| 52 and 54, King Street | II | 52 and 54, King Street | | | 2 August 1974 | TQ7628555756; 51°16′25″N 0°31′33″E | | 1086324 | Upload Photo | Q26376713 |
| 70, King Street | II | 70, King Street | | | 2 August 1974 | TQ7638355733; 51°16′24″N 0°31′38″E | | 1086325 | Upload Photo | Q26376718 |
| 72, King Street | II | 72, King Street | | | 2 August 1974 | TQ7639355732; 51°16′24″N 0°31′39″E | | 1086326 | Upload Photo | Q26376723 |
| 74, King Street | II | 74, King Street | | | 2 August 1974 | TQ7640855729; 51°16′24″N 0°31′39″E | | 1224563 | Upload Photo | Q26518735 |
| Brenchley Almshouses | II | 76-82, King Street | | | 21 June 1971 | TQ7642355726; 51°16′24″N 0°31′40″E | | 1336201 | Upload Photo | Q26620718 |
| East Layne House | II | 91, King Street | | | 2 August 1974 | TQ7643755741; 51°16′25″N 0°31′41″E | | 1086319 | Upload Photo | Q26376686 |
| East Boundary Wall Formerly to Digons | II | Knightrider Street | | | 11 May 1999 | TQ7616355361; 51°16′13″N 0°31′26″E | | 1387228 | Upload Photo | Q26666887 |
| North Boundary Wall Formerly to Digons | II | Knightrider Street | | | 11 May 1999 | TQ7613755368; 51°16′13″N 0°31′25″E | | 1387213 | Upload Photo | Q26666872 |
| 4a, Knightrider Street | II* | 4a, Knightrider Street | | | 30 July 1951 | TQ7624455399; 51°16′14″N 0°31′30″E | | 1336227 | 4a, Knightrider Street More images | Q17545346 |
| 6-10, Knightrider Street | II | 6-10, Knightrider Street | | | 2 August 1974 | TQ7622655397; 51°16′14″N 0°31′30″E | | 1224597 | Upload Photo | Q26518767 |
| Knightrider House | II | 14, Knightrider Street | | | 30 July 1951 | TQ7616655408; 51°16′14″N 0°31′26″E | | 1086327 | Upload Photo | Q26376729 |
| 15, Knightrider Street | II | 15, Knightrider Street | | | 11 May 1999 | TQ7620755361; 51°16′13″N 0°31′28″E | | 1387211 | Upload Photo | Q26666870 |
| The White Horse Public House | II | London Road | | | 2 August 1974 | TQ7530455737; 51°16′26″N 0°30′43″E | | 1266725 | Upload Photo | Q26557193 |
| 15 and 17, London Road | II | 15 and 17, London Road | | | 26 October 1971 | TQ7534855594; 51°16′21″N 0°30′45″E | | 1266748 | Upload Photo | Q26557214 |
| Rocky Hill House | II | 19, London Road | | | 30 July 1951 | TQ7532955612; 51°16′22″N 0°30′44″E | | 1336202 | Upload Photo | Q26620719 |
| 21 and 23, London Road | II | 21 and 23, London Road | | | 2 August 1974 | TQ7531055657; 51°16′23″N 0°30′43″E | | 1224614 | Upload Photo | Q26518782 |
| 53, London Road | II | 53, London Road | | | 2 August 1974 | TQ7511855881; 51°16′31″N 0°30′33″E | | 1086329 | Upload Photo | Q26376738 |
| South Lodge | II | 55, London Road, ME16 8JH | | | 2 August 1974 | TQ7510055906; 51°16′31″N 0°30′32″E | | 1336203 | Upload Photo | Q26620720 |
| 61, London Road | II | 61, London Road | | | 2 August 1974 | TQ7504856001; 51°16′35″N 0°30′30″E | | 1224634 | Upload Photo | Q26518799 |
| Somerfield Terrace | II | 63-77, London Road | | | 2 August 1974 | TQ7502156051; 51°16′36″N 0°30′29″E | | 1086330 | Upload Photo | Q26376743 |
| Medway House | II | 81, London Road, ME16 0DU | | | 30 July 1951 | TQ7497956164; 51°16′40″N 0°30′27″E | | 1086331 | Upload Photo | Q26376749 |
| Bower Lodge | II | 10, Lower Fant Road | | | 28 January 1987 | TQ7519154998; 51°16′02″N 0°30′35″E | | 1266215 | Upload Photo | Q26556726 |
| 2, Lower Stone Street | II | 2, Lower Stone Street | | | 30 July 1951 | TQ7618055619; 51°16′21″N 0°31′28″E | | 1336205 | Upload Photo | Q26620722 |
| 11, Lower Stone Street | II* | 11, Lower Stone Street | | | 30 July 1951 | TQ7623155550; 51°16′19″N 0°31′30″E | | 1086332 | Upload Photo | Q17545145 |
| 22, Lower Stone Street | II | 22, Lower Stone Street | | | 2 August 1974 | TQ7621055546; 51°16′19″N 0°31′29″E | | 1086333 | Upload Photo | Q26376754 |
| 26, Lower Stone Street | II | 26, Lower Stone Street | | | 2 August 1974 | TQ7621555526; 51°16′18″N 0°31′29″E | | 1336206 | Upload Photo | Q26620723 |
| Stone House or the Judges Lodgings | II* | 28, Lower Stone Street | | | 30 July 1951 | TQ7621755517; 51°16′18″N 0°31′29″E | | 1224677 | Stone House or the Judges Lodgings More images | Q17545233 |
| 30 and 32, Lower Stone Street | II | 30 and 32, Lower Stone Street | | | 7 January 1972 | TQ7622155498; 51°16′17″N 0°31′29″E | | 1086334 | Upload Photo | Q26376760 |
| 34, Lower Stone Street | II | 34, Lower Stone Street | | | 7 January 1972 | TQ7622655483; 51°16′16″N 0°31′30″E | | 1266706 | Upload Photo | Q26557176 |
| 36, Lower Stone Street | II | 36, Lower Stone Street | | | 19 February 1971 | TQ7622855472; 51°16′16″N 0°31′30″E | | 1086335 | Upload Photo | Q26376765 |
| 42, Lower Stone Street | II | 42, Lower Stone Street | | | 2 August 1974 | TQ7623055454; 51°16′16″N 0°31′30″E | | 1336207 | Upload Photo | Q26620724 |
| 44, Lower Stone Street | II | 44, Lower Stone Street | | | 2 August 1974 | TQ7623055448; 51°16′15″N 0°31′30″E | | 1224693 | Upload Photo | Q26518853 |
| 46, Lower Stone Street | II | 46, Lower Stone Street | | | 2 August 1974 | TQ7623155444; 51°16′15″N 0°31′30″E | | 1086336 | Upload Photo | Q26376770 |
| 50, Lower Stone Street | II | 50, Lower Stone Street | | | 2 August 1974 | TQ7623355439; 51°16′15″N 0°31′30″E | | 1086337 | Upload Photo | Q26376775 |
| 52 and 54, Lower Stone Street | II | 52 and 54, Lower Stone Street | | | 2 August 1974 | TQ7623455434; 51°16′15″N 0°31′30″E | | 1224695 | Upload Photo | Q26518856 |
| 58-68, Lower Stone Street | II | 58-68, Lower Stone Street | | | 2 August 1974 | TQ7624155411; 51°16′14″N 0°31′30″E | | 1224710 | Upload Photo | Q26518870 |
| Officers Quarters | II* | Maidstone Former Cavalry Barracks, Sandling Road | | | 2 August 1974 | TQ7580856440; 51°16′48″N 0°31′10″E | | 1225271 | Upload Photo | Q17545237 |
| The Market Buildings | II | Market Buildings | | | 2 August 1974 | TQ7598755823; 51°16′28″N 0°31′18″E | | 1086298 | Upload Photo | Q26376607 |
| The Unitarian Church | II | Market Buildings | | | 2 August 1974 | TQ7596855826; 51°16′28″N 0°31′17″E | | 1086301 | Upload Photo | Q26376622 |
| The Zoo | II | Market Buildings, ME14 1HP | | | 2 August 1974 | TQ7601755778; 51°16′26″N 0°31′19″E | | 1086297 | Upload Photo | Q26376601 |
| Phoenix Chambers | II | 6-8, Market Buildings | | | 2 August 1974 | TQ7599555785; 51°16′27″N 0°31′18″E | | 1086299 | Upload Photo | Q26376612 |
| 10, 11 and 12, Market Buildings | II | 10, 11 and 12, Market Buildings, ME14 1HP | | | 2 August 1974 | TQ7598055806; 51°16′27″N 0°31′18″E | | 1086300 | Upload Photo | Q26376617 |
| Church of Holy Trinity | II | Marsham Street | | | 30 July 1951 | TQ7626755897; 51°16′30″N 0°31′33″E | | 1086302 | Upload Photo | Q26376629 |
| 1-9, Marsham Street | II | 1-9, Marsham Street | | | 2 August 1974 | TQ7632055878; 51°16′29″N 0°31′35″E | | 1086303 | Upload Photo | Q26376634 |
| 61, Marsham Street | II | 61, Marsham Street, ME14 1EW | | | 2 August 1974 | TQ7630855855; 51°16′28″N 0°31′35″E | | 1086304 | Upload Photo | Q26376639 |
| The Town Hall | II* | Middle Row | | | 30 July 1951 | TQ7602755718; 51°16′24″N 0°31′20″E | | 1086305 | The Town Hall More images | Q17545135 |
| 1, Middle Row | II | 1, Middle Row | | | 2 August 1974 | TQ7601355708; 51°16′24″N 0°31′19″E | | 1224828 | Upload Photo | Q26518979 |
| 4 and 5, Middle Row | II | 4 and 5, Middle Row | | | 2 August 1974 | TQ7599855698; 51°16′24″N 0°31′18″E | | 1336230 | Upload Photo | Q26620746 |
| 8 and 9, Middle Row | II | 8 and 9, Middle Row | | | 2 August 1974 | TQ7598655690; 51°16′23″N 0°31′18″E | | 1266613 | Upload Photo | Q26557089 |
| The Stag | II | 11, Middle Row, ME14 1TG | | | 2 August 1974 | TQ7596955680; 51°16′23″N 0°31′17″E | | 1086306 | Upload Photo | Q26376644 |
| 12 and 13, Middle Row | II | 12 and 13, Middle Row | | | 2 August 1974 | TQ7595855674; 51°16′23″N 0°31′16″E | | 1086307 | Upload Photo | Q26376650 |
| Sunley House (former Barclays Bank) | II | 14-19, Middle Row | | | 17 September 2010 | TQ7594155663; 51°16′23″N 0°31′15″E | | 1393971 | Upload Photo | Q26673101 |
| Monckton War Memorial in All Saints Churchyard | II | Mill Street, ME15 6YE | | | 27 April 2010 | TQ7603355430; 51°16′15″N 0°31′20″E | | 1393766 | Upload Photo | Q95071587 |
| Parish Church of All Saints | I | Mill Street, ME15 6YE | | | 30 July 1951 | TQ7599855415; 51°16′15″N 0°31′18″E | | 1225056 | Upload Photo | Q4729500 |
| Rootes Maidstone | II | Mill Street | | | 1 October 2009 | TQ7600755576; 51°16′20″N 0°31′19″E | | 1393579 | Rootes Maidstone More images | Q26672732 |
| Ruined Gateway | II | Mill Street | | | 30 July 1951 | TQ7607055250; 51°16′09″N 0°31′21″E | | 1336235 | Ruined Gateway More images | Q26620748 |
| The Archbishop's Palace | I | Mill Street, ME15 6YE | | | 30 July 1951 | TQ7592555443; 51°16′16″N 0°31′14″E | | 1336232 | The Archbishop's Palace More images | Q4785587 |
| Gateway and Wall to Palace Gardens | II | Mill Street, ME15 6YE | | | 2 August 1974 | TQ7588455509; 51°16′18″N 0°31′12″E | | 1224844 | Gateway and Wall to Palace Gardens More images | Q96108025 |
| The Dungeons at the Archbishop's Palace | II* | Mill Street, ME15 6YE | | | 30 July 1951 | TQ7595255414; 51°16′15″N 0°31′15″E | | 1086309 | Upload Photo | Q96108034 |
| The Len Bridge | II | Mill Street, ME15 6YE | | | 30 July 1951 | TQ7596955504; 51°16′17″N 0°31′16″E | | 1266578 | Upload Photo | Q17641215 |
| Wall to East of Archbishop's Palace | II | Mill Street, ME15 6YE | | | 2 August 1974 | TQ7594755439; 51°16′15″N 0°31′15″E | | 1224889 | Upload Photo | Q96108027 |
| Wall to North and West of All Saints Church | II | Mill Street, ME15 6YE | | | 2 August 1974 | TQ7597955442; 51°16′15″N 0°31′17″E | | 1086311 | Upload Photo | Q95071415 |
| Wall to North West of Archbishop's Palace | II | Mill Street, ME15 6YE | | | 2 August 1974 | TQ7588655468; 51°16′16″N 0°31′12″E | | 1086308 | Upload Photo | Q96108028 |
| 16-20, Mill Street | II | 16-20, Mill Street | | | 2 August 1974 | TQ7593155578; 51°16′20″N 0°31′15″E | | 1224837 | Upload Photo | Q26518988 |
| 22, Mill Street | II | 22, Mill Street | | | 2 August 1974 | TQ7593255568; 51°16′20″N 0°31′15″E | | 1336231 | Upload Photo | Q26620747 |
| Keeper's Cottage | II | Mote Park | | | 30 July 1951 | TQ7788254239; 51°15′34″N 0°32′53″E | | 1086315 | Upload Photo | Q26376666 |
| Mote Cottage | II | Mote Park, ME15 8EA | | | 30 July 1951 | TQ7840154413; 51°15′39″N 0°33′20″E | | 1225162 | Upload Photo | Q26519281 |
| Mote House | II* | Mote Park | | | 30 July 1951 | TQ7809554991; 51°15′58″N 0°33′05″E | | 1086313 | Mote House More images | Q17545140 |
| Stables to Mote House | II | Mote Park | | | 2 August 1974 | TQ7811055074; 51°16′01″N 0°33′06″E | | 1225148 | Upload Photo | Q26519268 |
| Stone Pavilion in Mote Park | II | Mote Park | | | 30 July 1951 | TQ7756254425; 51°15′41″N 0°32′37″E | | 1086314 | Upload Photo | Q26376660 |
| The Old Brewhouse | II | Mote Park | | | 2 August 1974 | TQ7860554840; 51°15′53″N 0°33′31″E | | 1336196 | Upload Photo | Q26620713 |
| 1 and 2 Forge Lodges, Mote Park | II | 1 and 2 Forge Lodges, Mote Park, ME15 7BE | | | 11 July 2014 | TQ7770354164; 51°15′32″N 0°32′43″E | | 1417600 | Upload Photo | Q26676590 |
| Hunter's Almshouses | II | 52, 56, 58 and 62, Mote Road | | | 8 January 1974 | TQ7646655416; 51°16′14″N 0°31′42″E | | 1336197 | Upload Photo | Q26620714 |
| 64 to 70, Mote Road | II | 64 To 70, Mote Road | | | 8 January 1974 | TQ7649555415; 51°16′14″N 0°31′43″E | | 1266489 | Upload Photo | Q26556978 |
| Toll House on Island at Allington Lock | II | Nr. Castle Road | | | 22 September 2006 | TQ7473058149; 51°17′44″N 0°30′17″E | | 1391764 | Upload Photo | Q26671115 |
| The Gate House at the Archbishop's Palace | II | Old Palace Gardens, Mill Street, ME15 6YE | | | 30 July 1951 | TQ7596155488; 51°16′17″N 0°31′16″E | | 1086310 | Upload Photo | Q96108030 |
| 1 and 2 Farm Cottages, Old School Lane | II* | 1 and 2 Farm Cottages, Old School Lane | | | 30 July 1951 | TQ7791554183; 51°15′33″N 0°32′54″E | | 1266343 | Upload Photo | Q17545319 |
| 2-6, Palace Avenue | II | 2-6, Palace Avenue | | | 2 August 1974 | TQ7619255604; 51°16′20″N 0°31′28″E | | 1266694 | Upload Photo | Q26557164 |
| Chiltern Cottage | II | Penenden Heath Road | | | 2 August 1974 | TQ7735657165; 51°17′10″N 0°32′31″E | | 1086316 | Upload Photo | Q26376671 |
| All Saints Church of England School | II | Priory Road | | | 2 August 1974 | TQ7609455320; 51°16′11″N 0°31′23″E | | 1086271 | All Saints Church of England School More images | Q26376482 |
| Hever Lodge | II | Reginald Road | | | 4 August 1988 | TQ7526855180; 51°16′08″N 0°30′40″E | | 1266216 | Upload Photo | Q26556727 |
| 1-6, Rocky Hill Terrace | II | 1-6, Rocky Hill Terrace | | | 2 August 1974 | TQ7533955530; 51°16′19″N 0°30′44″E | | 1336217 | Upload Photo | Q26620734 |
| Romney House | II* | Romney Place | | | 30 July 1951 | TQ7625555544; 51°16′18″N 0°31′31″E | | 1086274 | Romney House More images | Q17545113 |
| 1-10, Romney Place | II | 1-10, Romney Place | | | 2 August 1974 | TQ7635155525; 51°16′18″N 0°31′36″E | | 1086273 | Upload Photo | Q26376492 |
| 11-14, Romney Place | II | 11-14, Romney Place | | | 2 August 1974 | TQ7638355526; 51°16′18″N 0°31′38″E | | 1336218 | Upload Photo | Q26620735 |
| Beam from a beam engine set on a plinth at Springfield Mill | II | Sandling Road | | | 2 August 1974 | TQ7559156600; 51°16′53″N 0°30′59″E | | 1266431 | Upload Photo | Q26556922 |
| Embankment and Railings Opposite Nos 63-90 (consecutive) and the Flowerpot Public House | II | Sandling Road | | | 2 August 1974 | TQ7577456625; 51°16′54″N 0°31′08″E | | 1336223 | Upload Photo | Q26620740 |
| Former Rag Room at Springfield Mill | II | Sandling Road | | | 2 August 1974 | TQ7557156615; 51°16′54″N 0°30′58″E | | 1086282 | Upload Photo | Q26376531 |
| The Flowerpot Public House | II | Sandling Road | | | 2 August 1974 | TQ7574456715; 51°16′57″N 0°31′07″E | | 1225433 | Upload Photo | Q26519530 |
| 63-65, Sandling Road | II | 63-65, Sandling Road | | | 2 August 1974 | TQ7579156596; 51°16′53″N 0°31′09″E | | 1086283 | Upload Photo | Q26376536 |
| 66-70, Sandling Road | II | 66-70, Sandling Road | | | 2 August 1974 | TQ7578556612; 51°16′53″N 0°31′09″E | | 1086284 | Upload Photo | Q26376542 |
| 71, Sandling Road | II | 71, Sandling Road | | | 2 August 1974 | TQ7578056626; 51°16′54″N 0°31′09″E | | 1266395 | Upload Photo | Q26556887 |
| 72, Sandling Road | II | 72, Sandling Road | | | 2 August 1974 | TQ7577856630; 51°16′54″N 0°31′09″E | | 1336220 | Upload Photo | Q26620737 |
| 73 and 74, Sandling Road | II | 73 and 74, Sandling Road | | | 2 August 1974 | TQ7577656636; 51°16′54″N 0°31′09″E | | 1086285 | Upload Photo | Q26376549 |
| 75 and 76, Sandling Road | II | 75 and 76, Sandling Road | | | 2 August 1974 | TQ7577356643; 51°16′55″N 0°31′08″E | | 1225390 | Upload Photo | Q26519491 |
| 77 and 78, Sandling Road | II | 77 and 78, Sandling Road | | | 2 August 1974 | TQ7577056650; 51°16′55″N 0°31′08″E | | 1336221 | Upload Photo | Q26620738 |
| 79, Sandling Road | II | 79, Sandling Road | | | 2 August 1974 | TQ7576756658; 51°16′55″N 0°31′08″E | | 1266366 | Upload Photo | Q26556861 |
| 80-85, Sandling Road | II | 80-85, Sandling Road | | | 2 August 1974 | TQ7576156671; 51°16′55″N 0°31′08″E | | 1086286 | Upload Photo | Q26376554 |
| 86, Sandling Road | II | 86, Sandling Road | | | 2 August 1974 | TQ7575656684; 51°16′56″N 0°31′08″E | | 1336222 | Upload Photo | Q26620739 |
| 87, Sandling Road | II | 87, Sandling Road | | | 2 August 1974 | TQ7575456689; 51°16′56″N 0°31′07″E | | 1266372 | Upload Photo | Q26556865 |
| 88 and 89, Sandling Road | II | 88 and 89, Sandling Road | | | 2 August 1974 | TQ7575256695; 51°16′56″N 0°31′07″E | | 1086287 | Upload Photo | Q26376559 |
| 92 and 94, Sandling Road | II | 92 and 94, Sandling Road | | | 2 August 1974 | TQ7574856705; 51°16′57″N 0°31′07″E | | 1086288 | Upload Photo | Q26376565 |
| St Andrew's House at Oakwood Hospital | II | St Andrews Road | | | 2 August 1974 | TQ7347955147; 51°16′09″N 0°29′07″E | | 1086275 | Upload Photo | Q26376497 |
| Gate and Lodges of Oakwood Hospital | II | St Andrew's Road | | | 2 August 1974 | TQ7351155030; 51°16′05″N 0°29′09″E | | 1336219 | Upload Photo | Q26620736 |
| Lodge to East of St Andrew's House at Oakwood Hospital | II | St Andrew's Road | | | 2 August 1974 | TQ7364055204; 51°16′10″N 0°29′16″E | | 1086277 | Upload Photo | Q26376509 |
| Queens House at Oakwood Hospital | II | St Andrew's Road | | | 2 August 1974 | TQ7355855317; 51°16′14″N 0°29′12″E | | 1086278 | Upload Photo | Q26376514 |
| The Beeches at Oakwood Hospital | II | St Andrew's Road | | | 2 August 1974 | TQ7361555062; 51°16′06″N 0°29′14″E | | 1086279 | Upload Photo | Q26376520 |
| Wall to South of Oakwood Hospital | II | St Andrew's Road | | | 2 August 1974 | TQ7366455043; 51°16′05″N 0°29′17″E | | 1086276 | Upload Photo | Q26376504 |
| Maidstone Museum | II* | St Faith's Street, ME14 1LH | | | 30 July 1951 | TQ7589556005; 51°16′34″N 0°31′14″E | | 1222803 | Maidstone Museum More images | Q99671026 |
| 12, St Faith's Street | II | 12, St Faith's Street, ME14 1LL | | | 2 August 1974 | TQ7598456023; 51°16′34″N 0°31′18″E | | 1267597 | Upload Photo | Q26557987 |
| St Faiths' Chambers | II | 14, St Faith's Street, ME14 1LL | | | 2 August 1974 | TQ7598056021; 51°16′34″N 0°31′18″E | | 1086374 | Upload Photo | Q26376950 |
| 16, St Faith's Street | II | 16, St Faith's Street, ME14 1LL | | | 30 July 1951 | TQ7597556019; 51°16′34″N 0°31′18″E | | 1336189 | Upload Photo | Q26620706 |
| 29 to 39, St Faith's Street | II | 29 To 39, St Faith's Street, ME14 1LJ | | | 2 August 1974 | TQ7594755987; 51°16′33″N 0°31′16″E | | 1336188 | Upload Photo | Q26620705 |
| Sir John Banks Almshouses | II | 29-39, St Faith's Street, ME14 1LJ | | | 30 July 1951 | TQ7594955982; 51°16′33″N 0°31′16″E | | 1222767 | Upload Photo | Q26517071 |
| 60, 62 and 62a (incorporates 1 Nelson's Yard), St Faith's Street | II | 60, 62 and 62a (incorporates 1 Nelson's Yard), St Faith's Street | | | 30 July 1951 | TQ7578955952; 51°16′32″N 0°31′08″E | | 1222871 | Upload Photo | Q26517170 |
| Church of St Luke | II | St Luke's Road | | | 2 August 1974 | TQ7653956466; 51°16′48″N 0°31′48″E | | 1086280 | Upload Photo | Q26376525 |
| Former Church of St Peter | II* | St Peter's Street | | | 30 July 1951 | TQ7559855633; 51°16′22″N 0°30′58″E | | 1086281 | Former Church of St Peter More images | Q17545120 |
| Former Tilling-Stevens Factory | II | St Peter's Street, ME16 0ST | | | 17 February 2012 | TQ7560456110; 51°16′37″N 0°30′59″E | | 1408072 | Upload Photo | Q26675972 |
| Briarwood | II | Sutton Road | | | 31 January 1991 | TQ7904152250; 51°14′29″N 0°33′49″E | | 1225747 | Upload Photo | Q26519814 |
| 21, The Broadway | II | 21, The Broadway | | | 2 August 1974 | TQ7563755449; 51°16′16″N 0°30′59″E | | 1336160 | Upload Photo | Q26620678 |
| Church of St Michael and All Angels | II | Tonbridge Road, ME16 8AF | | | 16 December 2021 | TQ7489455270; 51°16′11″N 0°30′21″E | | 1477608 | Church of St Michael and All Angels More images | Q105092625 |
| Maidstone Borough War Memorial | II | Tonbridge Road | | | 9 June 2011 | TQ7558655469; 51°16′17″N 0°30′57″E | | 1401312 | Upload Photo | Q26675478 |
| 33, Tonbridge Road | II | 33, Tonbridge Road | | | 2 August 1974 | TQ7529355296; 51°16′11″N 0°30′41″E | | 1225478 | Upload Photo | Q26519570 |
| Warwick House | II | 64, Tonbridge Road | | | 30 July 1951 | TQ7517655352; 51°16′13″N 0°30′35″E | | 1336225 | Upload Photo | Q26620742 |
| 82-88, Tonbridge Road | II | 82-88, Tonbridge Road | | | 2 August 1974 | TQ7506755351; 51°16′14″N 0°30′30″E | | 1343324 | Upload Photo | Q26627135 |
| 90 and 92, Tonbridge Road | II | 90 and 92, Tonbridge Road | | | 2 August 1974 | TQ7505555351; 51°16′14″N 0°30′29″E | | 1086292 | Upload Photo | Q26376579 |
| 96, Tonbridge Road | II | 96, Tonbridge Road | | | 2 August 1974 | TQ7504555350; 51°16′14″N 0°30′29″E | | 1336226 | Upload Photo | Q26620743 |
| 310, Tonbridge Road | II | 310, Tonbridge Road | | | 2 August 1974 | TQ7403455087; 51°16′06″N 0°29′36″E | | 1075781 | Upload Photo | Q26339593 |
| 432-450, Tonbridge Road | II | 432-450, Tonbridge Road | | | 2 August 1974 | TQ7339154851; 51°15′59″N 0°29′02″E | | 1086293 | Upload Photo | Q26376585 |
| The Tithe Barn | I | Tyrwhitt Drake Museum Of Carriages, Mill Street, ME15 6YE | | | 30 July 1951 | TQ7603255481; 51°16′17″N 0°31′20″E | | 1336233 | The Tithe Barn More images | Q7809944 |
| Methodist Church | II | Union Street | | | 2 August 1974 | TQ7614656068; 51°16′36″N 0°31′27″E | | 1225500 | Methodist Church More images | Q26519590 |
| The Salvation Army Hall | II | Union Street | | | 2 August 1974 | TQ7616355985; 51°16′33″N 0°31′27″E | | 1225501 | Upload Photo | Q26519591 |
| Wall and Railings to South of the Methodist Church | II | Union Street | | | 2 August 1974 | TQ7615856014; 51°16′34″N 0°31′27″E | | 1266335 | Upload Photo | Q26556832 |
| 38-70, Union Street | II | 38-70, Union Street | | | 2 August 1974 | TQ7621956008; 51°16′33″N 0°31′30″E | | 1225502 | Upload Photo | Q26519592 |
| 96 and 98, Union Street | II | 96 and 98, Union Street | | | 2 August 1974 | TQ7632756019; 51°16′34″N 0°31′36″E | | 1266336 | Upload Photo | Q26556833 |
| 100 and 100a, Union Street | II | 100 and 100a, Union Street | | | 2 August 1974 | TQ7633156022; 51°16′34″N 0°31′36″E | | 1225503 | Upload Photo | Q26519593 |
| 102, Union Street | II | 102, Union Street | | | 2 August 1974 | TQ7633756025; 51°16′34″N 0°31′36″E | | 1266337 | Upload Photo | Q26556834 |
| 106, Union Street | II | 106, Union Street | | | 2 August 1974 | TQ7634856025; 51°16′34″N 0°31′37″E | | 1225504 | 106, Union Street More images | Q26519594 |
| 20 and 22, Upper Fant Road | II | 20 and 22, Upper Fant Road | | | 2 August 1974 | TQ7507155096; 51°16′05″N 0°30′29″E | | 1225505 | Upload Photo | Q26519595 |
| 33, 35, 37 and 39, Upper Fant Road | II | 33, 35, 37 and 39, Upper Fant Road | | | 2 August 1974 | TQ7500555123; 51°16′06″N 0°30′26″E | | 1266338 | Upload Photo | Q26556835 |
| Wren's Cross | II | Upper Stone Street | | | 30 July 1951 | TQ7624255357; 51°16′12″N 0°31′30″E | | 1225554 | Upload Photo | Q26519638 |
| 27, Upper Stone Street | II | 27, Upper Stone Street | | | 2 August 1974 | TQ7631055323; 51°16′11″N 0°31′34″E | | 1225548 | 27, Upper Stone Street More images | Q26519634 |
| 29 and 31, Upper Stone Street | II | 29 and 31, Upper Stone Street | | | 2 August 1974 | TQ7631555310; 51°16′11″N 0°31′34″E | | 1266339 | Upload Photo | Q26556836 |
| 135-141, Upper Stone Street | II | 135-141, Upper Stone Street | | | 2 August 1974 | TQ7639555023; 51°16′01″N 0°31′38″E | | 1225552 | Upload Photo | Q26519637 |
| 9, Waterside | II | 9, Waterside | | | 30 July 1951 | TQ7577855954; 51°16′32″N 0°31′07″E | | 1225555 | Upload Photo | Q26519639 |
| 18, Week Street | II | 18, Week Street | | | 2 August 1975 | TQ7609955822; 51°16′28″N 0°31′24″E | | 1225557 | Upload Photo | Q26519641 |
| 22, Week Street | II | 22, Week Street | | | 2 August 1974 | TQ7609755834; 51°16′28″N 0°31′24″E | | 1225558 | Upload Photo | Q26519642 |
| 55, 55a and 57, Week Street | II | 55, 55a and 57, Week Street | | | 30 July 1951 | TQ7602455952; 51°16′32″N 0°31′20″E | | 1225556 | Upload Photo | Q26519640 |
| 108, Week Street | II | 108, Week Street | | | 2 August 1974 | TQ7600956129; 51°16′38″N 0°31′20″E | | 1225560 | Upload Photo | Q26519644 |
| Grove House | II* | 124, Week Street | | | 30 July 1951 | TQ7603056192; 51°16′40″N 0°31′21″E | | 1266232 | Upload Photo | Q17545309 |
| 2 and 3, White Rock Court | II | 2 and 3, White Rock Court, White Rock Place, ME16 8HX | | | 24 January 1985 | TQ7525255402; 51°16′15″N 0°30′39″E | | 1225696 | Upload Photo | Q26519770 |
| The Old Farmhouse | II | Willington Street | | | 30 July 1951 | TQ7835853685; 51°15′16″N 0°33′16″E | | 1266233 | Upload Photo | Q26556743 |
| Willington House | II | Willington Street | | | 2 August 1974 | TQ7856654388; 51°15′38″N 0°33′28″E | | 1266283 | Upload Photo | Q26556787 |
| Willington Place | II* | Willington Street | | | 30 July 1951 | TQ7834054050; 51°15′28″N 0°33′16″E | | 1266284 | Willington Place More images | Q17545314 |
| Willington Place Farmhouse | II | Willington Street | | | 30 July 1951 | TQ7831253996; 51°15′26″N 0°33′15″E | | 1225562 | Upload Photo | Q26519646 |
| Woodside | II | 2, Willington Street | | | 2 August 1974 | TQ7834554174; 51°15′32″N 0°33′17″E | | 1225694 | Upload Photo | Q26519768 |
| Mote Cricket Club | II | Willow Way, ME15 7RN | | | 27 November 2013 | TQ7694355120; 51°16′04″N 0°32′06″E | | 1416462 | Upload Photo | Q26676518 |
| 29-33, Wyatt Street | II | 29-33, Wyatt Street | | | 2 August 1974 | TQ7635355990; 51°16′33″N 0°31′37″E | | 1225695 | Upload Photo | Q26519769 |
| 34-36, Wyatt Street | II | 34-36, Wyatt Street | | | 2 August 1974 | TQ7635455969; 51°16′32″N 0°31′37″E | | 1266234 | Upload Photo | Q26556744 |
| Brenchley Gardens | II* | ME14 1QN | | | 2 August 1974 | TQ7588756128; 51°16′38″N 0°31′13″E | | 1086395 | Upload Photo | Q26227509 |
| Chimney at Springfield Mill | II | | | | 11 September 2015 | TQ7571556626; 51°16′54″N 0°31′05″E | | 1428651 | Upload Photo | Q26677470 |
| Maidstone West Signal Box | II | | | | 18 July 2013 | TQ7554055120; 51°16′06″N 0°30′54″E | | 1415105 | Maidstone West Signal Box More images | Q26676431 |
| Water Pump Situated in Passage Beside No 22 | II | | | | 2 August 1974 | TQ7610255839; 51°16′28″N 0°31′24″E | | 1225559 | Upload Photo | Q26519643 |

== See also ==
- Grade I listed buildings in Kent
- Grade II* listed buildings in Kent

== Sources ==
- Newman, John (2012) [1969], Kent: West and the Weald, The Buildings of England, New Haven and London: Yale University Press, ISBN 978-0-300-18509-6
