= Fremlin Walk =

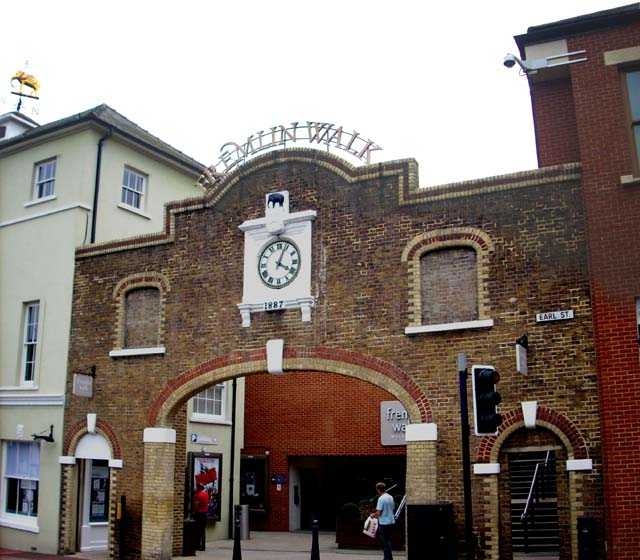
- Entrance to Fremlin Walk
- Location: Maidstone, Kent, England
- Coordinates: 51°16′30″N 0°31′12″E
- Opened: 31 March 2005
- Developer: Centros Miller
- Manager: Lloyd Wright
- Owner: Frasers Group
- Num. of stores: 50
- Floor area: 350,000 sq ft (33,000 m^{2})
- Parking: 800 spaces

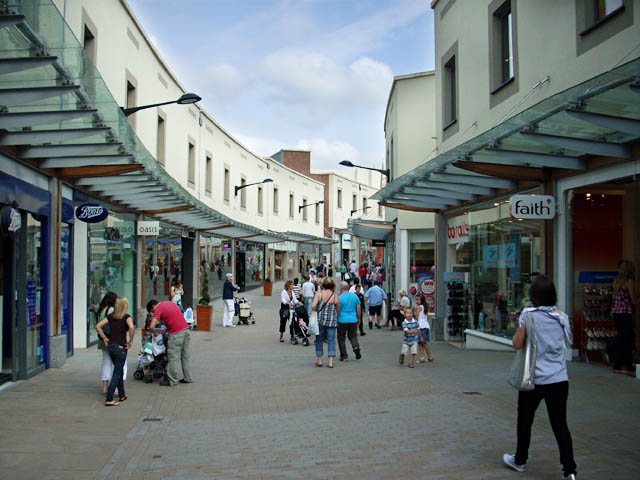
Fremlin Walk.

Fremlin Walk is an outdoor shopping centre in Maidstone town centre, Kent, England. It opened in 2005 after several years of development by Centros Miller to include 350,000 sq ft (33,000 m^{2}) of shopping and a 760 space car park.

The original owner was Landsec. Legal & General bought the centre in 2011 for £92 million. It then passed to M&G Real Estate for £110m. This was then later acquired by Frasers Group for £25m in October 2024.

== Location ==
The main pedestrian entrance to the centre is from the pedestrianised Week Street (one of Maidstone's main shopping streets) to the east. There are other pedestrian entrances from St Faith's Street to the north and Earl Street, to the south. The A229 Fairmeadow runs parallel to the River Medway at the western end of the centre, but is approximately 2 storeys lower than the shopping centre.

The car park for the centre is located below the House of Fraser department store at the western end; vehicle access is from Fairmeadow and Earl Street.

Maidstone East railway station is 330 metres (1,080 ft) north of the main pedestrian entrance, along Week Street.

== History ==
The site was previously the Fremlin's Brewery. It closed to brewing in 1972 and the existing building was just used as a bottling depot. Later on, the site was downgraded once more to a despatch depot. The only original structure from when the site was a brewery, is the arch entrance and clock.

To fit in with the scheme of 'new life' for the river area in the town, it was decided that the shipping depot should be demolished, and something new put in its place; a shopping centre.

There are still many reminders of the site's past. For example, the management office buildings bear the original gold elephant weather vane, an icon of the company. Also, the Fremlins clock was replaced with an identical replica provided by Maidstone Rotary Club. The original brewery entrance has been maintained, and now forms one of the pedestrian entrances.

One of the original trademark nodding elephants from the original brewery is on display, fully restored, in the adjacent Maidstone Museum & Art Gallery.

In September 2016, Britain's Got Talent held auditions at the Bandstand.

== Retail ==
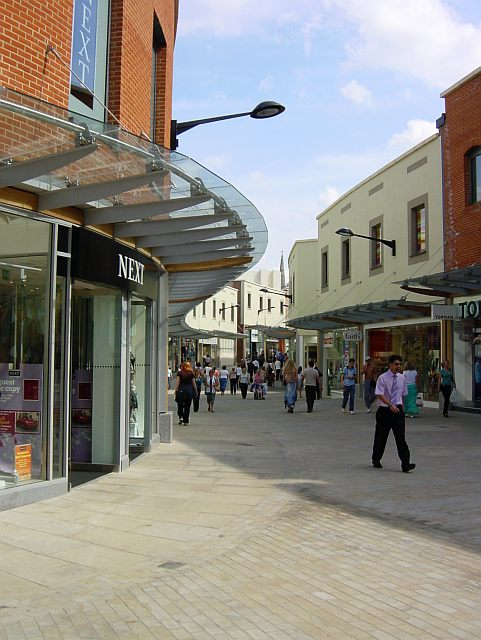

The centre has over 50 shops, and these are mainly top high street brands, as well as phone shops, and various shoe shops. There are cafés, coffee shops and bench seating. Since its opening in 2005, Maidstone has made its way into the top 50 shopping towns in the UK, and now stands at 44th in 2013.

The centre is anchored by a House of Fraser department store, at the western (Fairmeadow) end. Other large stores within the centre include Boots, Søstrene Grene, River Island, Zara and Superdry.
