= Maidstone =

County town of Kent, England

Coordinates: 51.272°N 0.529°E

- Town
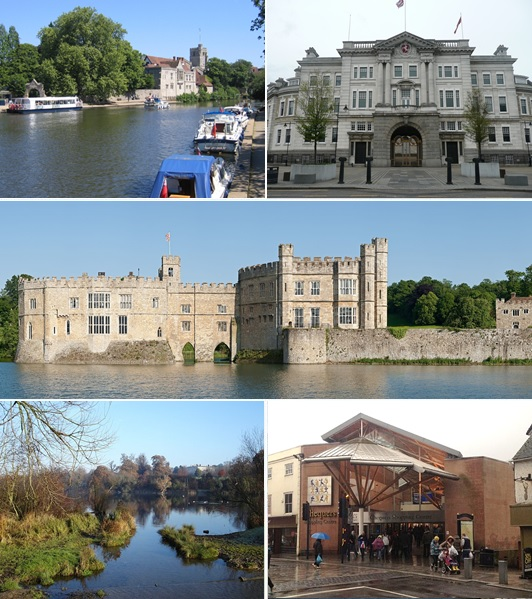
- From top left: River Medway with Maidstone's historic All Saints Church, County Hall, Leeds Castle, Mote Park, The Mall Maidstone shopping centre.

- Coat of arms

- Location within Kent
- Population: 109,490 (2021)
- OS grid reference: TQ759556
  - London: 32 miles (51 km)
- District: Maidstone
- Shire county: Kent
- Region: South East
- Country: England
- Sovereign state: United Kingdom
- Post town: MAIDSTONE
- Postcode district: ME14–ME18
- Dialling code: 01622
- Police: Kent
- Fire: Kent
- Ambulance: South East Coast
- UK Parliament: Maidstone and Malling; Faversham and Mid Kent

Maidstone is the largest town in the county of Kent in South East England, of which it is also the county town. Maidstone is historically important and lies 32 miles (51 km) east-south-east of London. The River Medway runs through the centre of the town, linking it with Rochester and the Thames Estuary. Historically, the river carried much of the town's trade as the centre of the agricultural county of Kent, which is known as the Garden of England. There is evidence of settlement in the area dating back before the Stone Age. The town, part of the borough of Maidstone, had an approximate population of 100,000 in 2019. Since World War II, the town's economy has shifted from heavy industry towards light industry and services.

== Toponymy ==
Saxon charters dating back to c. 975 show the first recorded instances of the town's name, de maeides stana and maegdan stane, possibly meaning stone of the maidens or stone of the people. The latter meaning may refer to the nearby megalith around which gatherings took place. The name evolved through medestan/meddestane in the Domesday Book of 1086, with possible variation Mayndenstan in 1396. The modern name appeared by 1610. It has been suggested that the name derives from stones set into the river to allow clothes to be rinsed in the cleaner water away from the banks.

== History ==
Neolithic finds have revealed the earliest occupation of the area, and the Romans have left their mark in the road through the town and evidence of villas. The Normans set up a shire moot, and religious organisations established an abbey at Boxley, hospitals and a college for priests. Today's prosperous suburb of Penenden Heath was an historic site of legal proceedings (courts) and also a place of execution in medieval times.

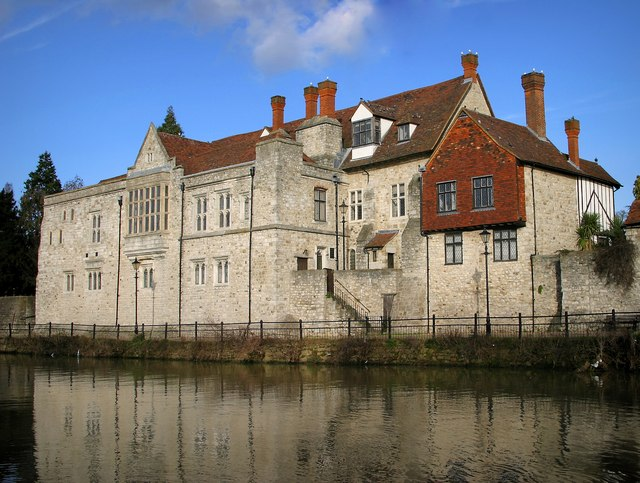
Archbishop's Palace

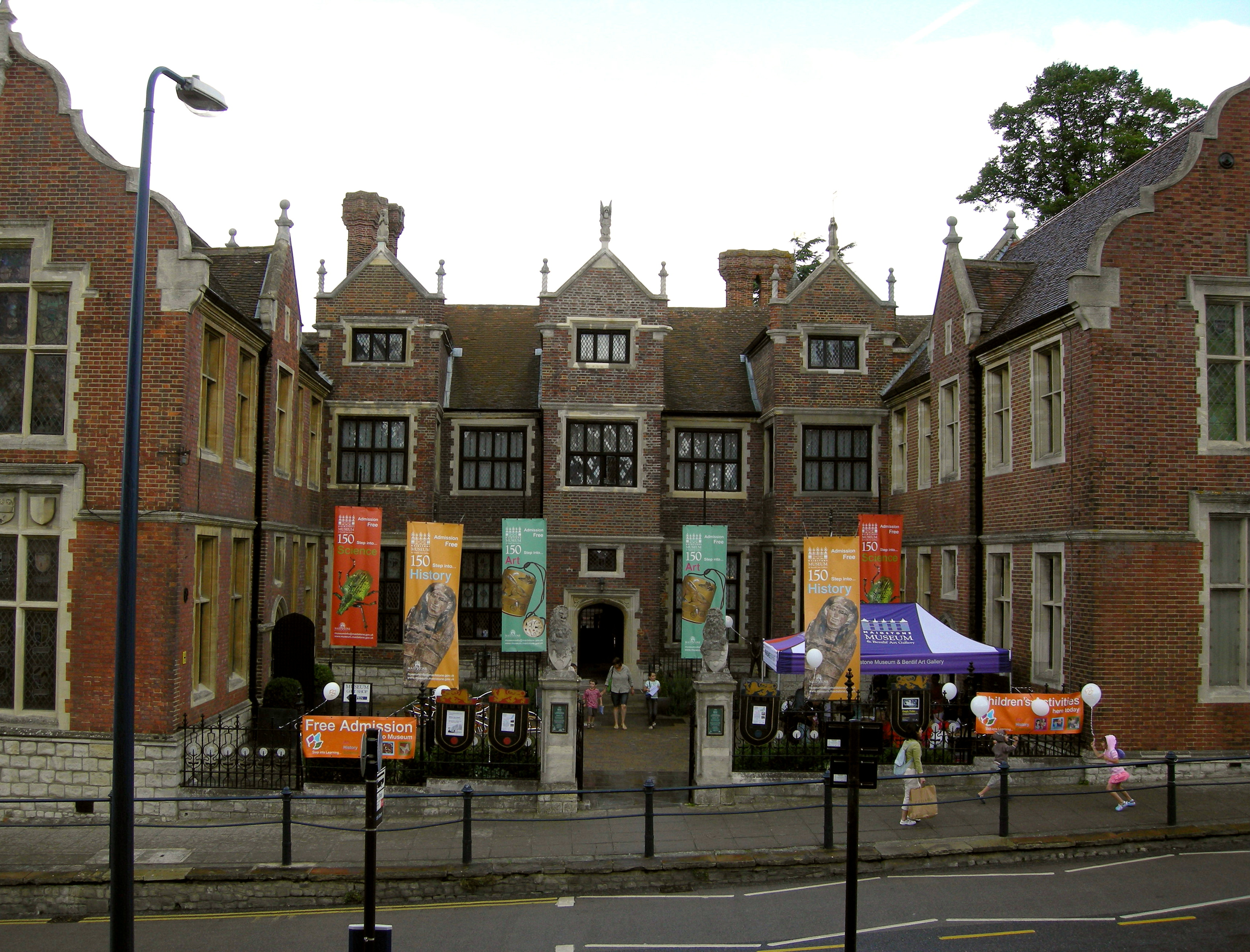
Maidstone Museum

Maidstone played a key role during the Peasants' Revolt of 1381. The rebel priest, John Ball, had been imprisoned there and was freed by Kentish rebels under the command of Wat Tyler, who is reputed to have been a resident of the town.

Maidstone's charter as a town was granted in 1549; although briefly revoked, a new charter in 1551 created the town as a borough. The charter was ratified in 1619 under James I, and the coat of arms was designed, bearing a golden lion and a representation of the river (in heraldic terms: Or, a fess wavy Azure between three roundels Gules, on a chief Gules a leopard passant gardant Or). The arms also include the head of a white horse (representing Invicta, the motto of the county of Kent), a golden lion and an Iguanodon. The Iguanodon relates to dinosaur fossils discovered in Maidstone in 1834, then classified as Iguanodon but are now believed to belong to the related Mantellisaurus. The remains are currently held in the Natural History Museum in London. Maidstone has had the right to a town gaol since 1604.

During the English Civil War, the Battle of Maidstone took place in 1648, resulting in a victory for the Parliamentarians. Andrew Broughton, who was Mayor of Maidstone in 1649 (and also Clerk to the High Court of Justice) was responsible for declaring the death sentence on Charles I, and today a plaque in Maidstone Town Centre memorialises Broughton as 'Mayor and Regicide'.

Paper mills, stone quarrying, brewing and the cloth industry have all flourished here. The paper maker James Whatman and his son invented wove paper (Whatman paper) at Turkey Mill from 1740, an important development in the history of printing.

A permanent military presence was established in the town with the completion of cavalry barracks in 1798. Invicta Park Barracks is currently home to the 36 Engineer Regiment.

Maidstone Prison is north of the town centre and was completed in 1819.

In 1897–1898 the Maidstone typhoid epidemic killed at least 132 people, and was the largest typhoid epidemic at the time. Hundreds of nurses from around the country volunteered to care for the patients, and several nurses were sent by Eva Luckes, matron of The London Hospital, including Edith Cavell.

=== Modern history ===
Modern Maidstone incorporates a number of outlying villages and settlements (see Geography below).

The county council offices at the front of the prison near Maidstone East station were built of Portland stone between 1910 and 1913. On 29 September 1975 a local pub serving the Invicta Park Barracks, The Hare and Hounds, was damaged by a bomb during an IRA campaign in England.

Maidstone General Hospital opened on the outskirts of the town in 1983, replacing the West Kent General Hospital, which opened 150 years earlier in Marsham Street, and the Victorian Ophthalmic ('Ear, Nose and Throat') Hospital which was nearby to it. The General Hospital is just to the north of Oakwood Hospital (originally the Kent County Asylum), which closed in the mid-1990s the site of which has now been developed for housing. It was at Maidstone General Hospital that the member of the Monty Python team Graham Chapman died of throat and spinal cancer in 1989 [ref. his biographer Bob McCabe].

Residents are mainly employed in the retail, administrative and service sectors; there are some industrial estates around the town providing employment. Some of the workforce commute to other towns, including to London.

== Governance ==
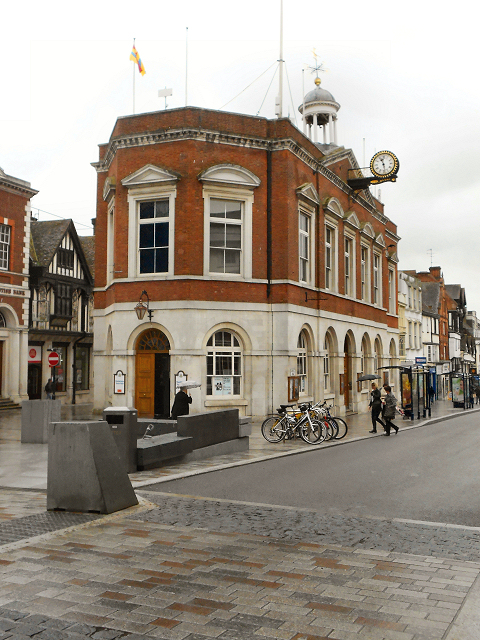
Maidstone Town Hall, completed in 1763

=== Members of Parliament ===
The town is divided between the constituencies of Maidstone and Malling, (Maidstone and The Weald until 2024), and Faversham and Mid Kent. Before 1997 Maidstone was in the county constituency of Maidstone. The current Member of Parliament (MP) for Maidstone and Malling is Conservative Helen Grant. Previous MPs include Ann Widdecombe, Sir John Wells, Sir Alfred Bossom and Benjamin Disraeli. Since 2015 the MP for Faversham and Mid Kent has been Conservative Helen Whately. Prior to the 2015 election, the MP was Conservative Sir Hugh Robertson and, before him, another Conservative, Andrew Rowe.

=== Local government ===
Kent County Council is responsible for social services, education, maintenance of and new road infrastructure, fire services and minerals. It is elected every four years: Maidstone elects nine representatives, and villages are in the four rural wards.

The town is the main town of Maidstone borough, which includes the surrounding rural areas except to the north-west. The town is divided into the 12 local government wards of Allington, Bridge, Downswood and Otham, East, Fant, Heath, High Street, Park Wood, Shepway North, Shepway South, South, and North. These wards have 30 of the 55 seats on Borough Council.

Maidstone Borough Council is responsible for services such as recreation, refuse collection, most planning decisions and social housing.

Maidstone was a municipal borough, the district contained only the parish of Maidstone, on 1 April the district was abolished to form the non-metropolitan district of Maidstone. No successor parish was formed so it became unparished. It is planned to be parished on 1 April 2027.

== Geography ==
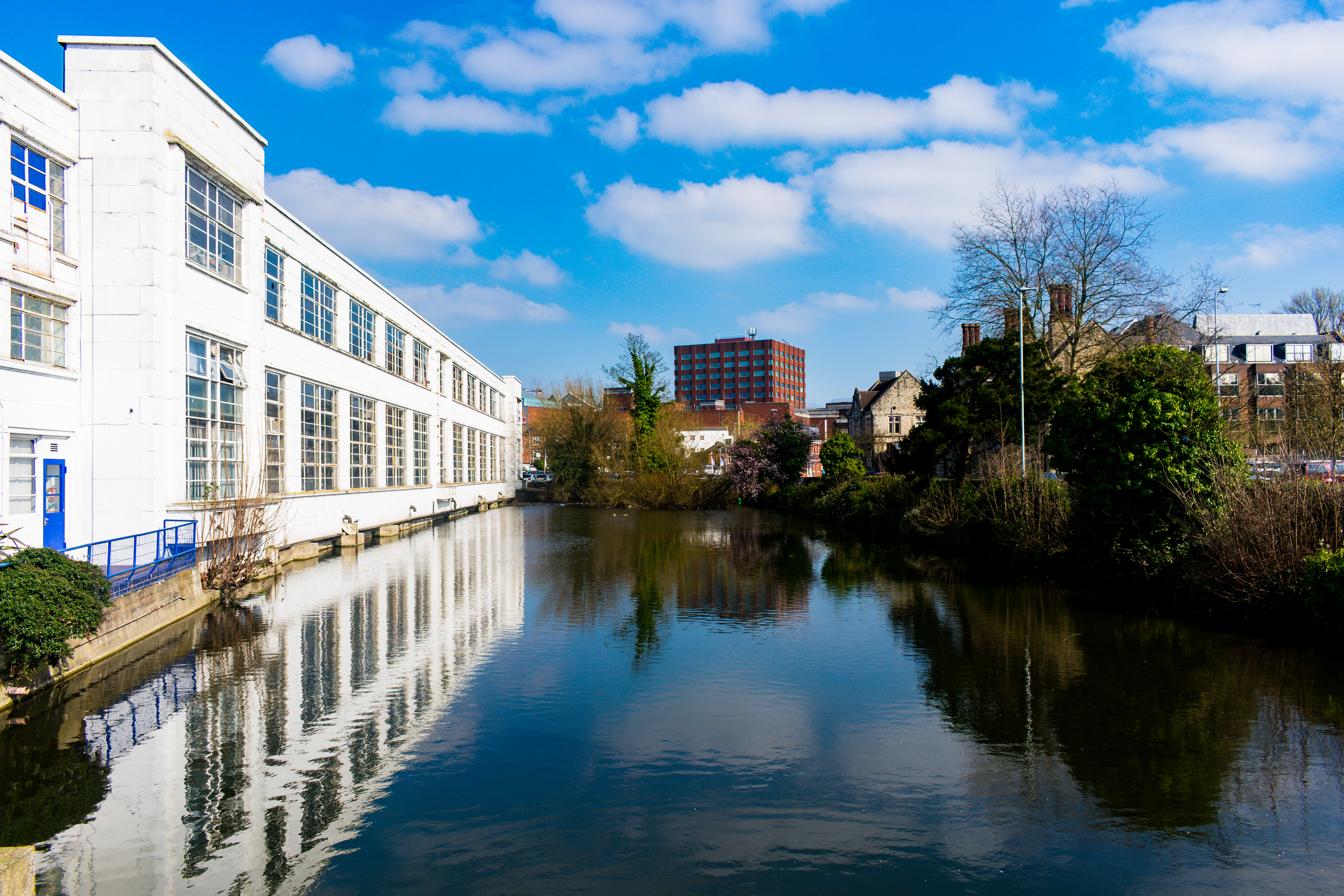
A former millpond on the River Len, Mill Street/Palace Avenue Maidstone.

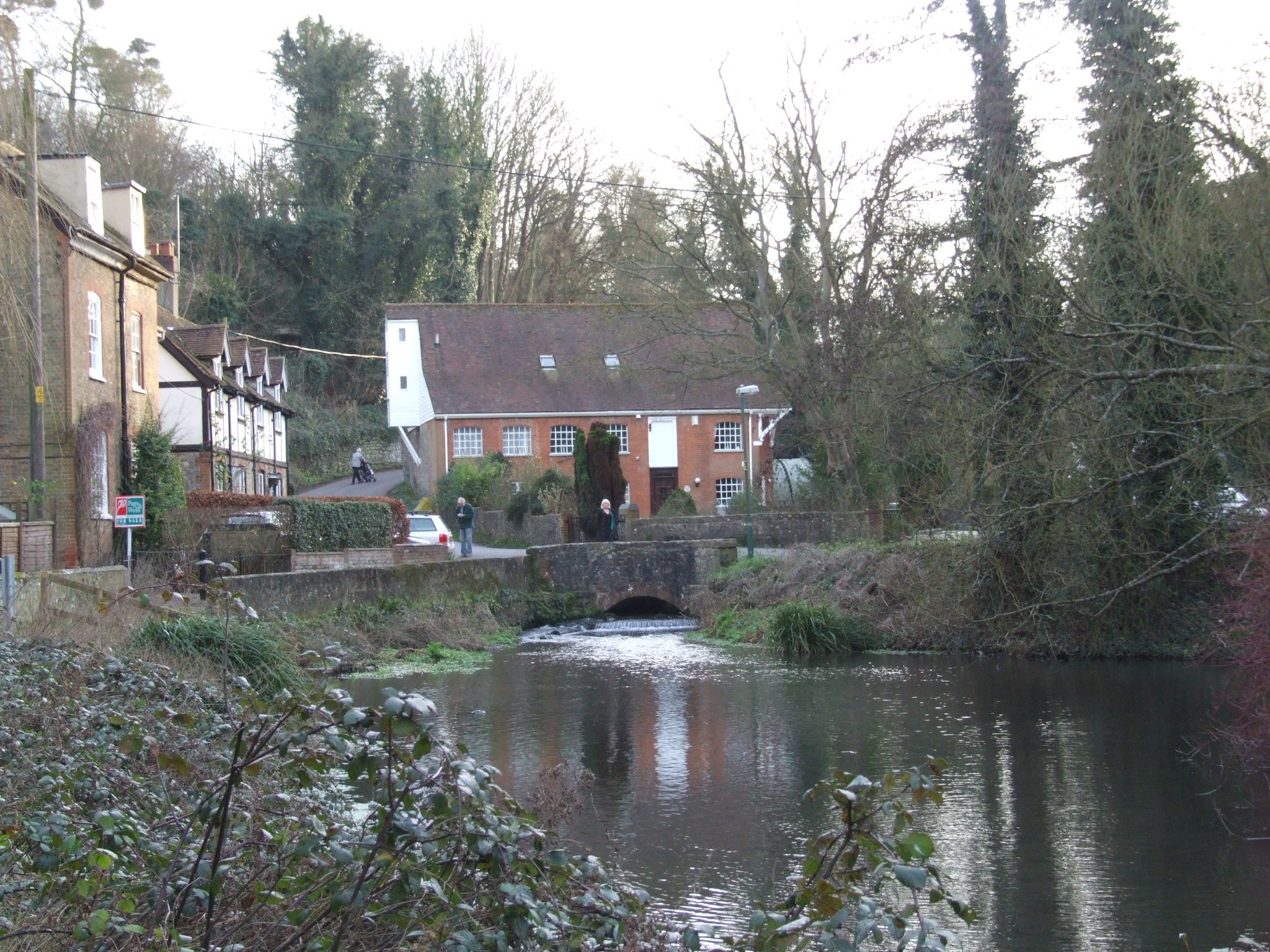
Lower Crisbrook Mill mill pond and Upper Crisbrook Mill, on the Loose Stream.

The town is six miles downstream from where the River Medway, having flowed in a generally west–east direction, is joined by the Rivers Teise and Beult at Yalding and changes its course to a northerly one. It cuts through the ridge formed by the greensand, so that the town occupies a site on two opposite hills, the easterly one containing the town centre. Beyond that, and higher, is Penenden Heath.

The River Len joins the Medway at Maidstone. Though a short river, it provided the water to drive numerous watermills. The Loose Stream, which rises at Langley and joins at Tovil, once powered over 30 mills. Mill ponds on these rivers are a prominent feature of the landscape.

Maidstone has continued to grow. In doing so it has incorporated hitherto separate settlements, villages and hamlets within its boundaries. These include Allington, Barming, Bearsted, Penenden Heath, Sandling, Tovil and Weavering Street. Housing estates include Grove Green, Harbourland, Ringlestone, Roseacre, Shepway, Senacre and Vinters Park.

Maidstone was at one time a centre of industry, brewing and paper making being among the most important. Nowadays smaller industrial units encircle the town. The site of Fremlin's Brewery, once the largest in Kent, is now Fremlin Walk shopping centre. The pedestrianised areas of the High Street and King Street run up from the river crossing at Lockmeadow; Week Street and Gabriel's Hill bisect this route.

=== Climate ===
Kent experiences a maritime climate with warm summers and mild winters, like most of the United Kingdom. The nearest official Met Office weather station for which online records are available is at East Malling, about three miles west of Maidstone.

East Malling's highest temperature of 37.4 °C (99.3 °F) was recorded in August 2003. The lowest temperature recorded is −17.8 °C (0.0 °F) during January 1947 and 1972. East Malling also holds the record for the mildest January day in South East England, 17.4 °C (63.3 °F), also set in 2003. The lowest temperature recorded in recent years was −10.7 °C (12.7 °F) on 20 December 2010. The Köppen Climate Classification subtype for this climate is "Cfb" (Marine West Coast Climate).

Climate data for East Malling 1961–1990 (Weather station 3 miles (5 km) to the West of Maidstone)
Month	Jan	Feb	Mar	Apr	May	Jun	Jul	Aug	Sep	Oct	Nov	Dec	Year
Record high °C (°F)	17.4 (63.3)	17.2 (63.0)	22.6 (72.7)	27.7 (81.9)	31.2 (88.2)	34.1 (93.4)	35.5 (95.9)	37.4 (99.3)	31.6 (88.9)	29.1 (84.4)	19.5 (67.1)	16.8 (62.2)	37.4 (99.3)
Mean daily maximum °C (°F)	6.8 (44.2)	7.1 (44.8)	9.8 (49.6)	12.4 (54.3)	16.3 (61.3)	19.5 (67.1)	21.6 (70.9)	21.5 (70.7)	18.9 (66.0)	15.1 (59.2)	10.2 (50.4)	7.8 (46.0)	13.9 (57.0)
Mean daily minimum °C (°F)	1.2 (34.2)	1.2 (34.2)	2.4 (36.3)	4.2 (39.6)	6.9 (44.4)	9.8 (49.6)	11.9 (53.4)	11.6 (52.9)	9.5 (49.1)	7.0 (44.6)	3.6 (38.5)	2.1 (35.8)	5.9 (42.6)
Record low °C (°F)	−17.8 (0.0)	−9.4 (15.1)	−9.9 (14.2)	−5.3 (22.5)	−1.7 (28.9)	1.6 (34.9)	4.7 (40.5)	4.0 (39.2)	1.8 (35.2)	−3.7 (25.3)	−9.7 (14.5)	−10.7 (12.7)	−17.4 (0.7)
Average precipitation mm (inches)	62 (2.4)	41 (1.6)	49 (1.9)	46 (1.8)	47 (1.9)	50 (2.0)	45 (1.8)	48 (1.9)	60 (2.4)	60 (2.4)	67 (2.6)	65 (2.6)	640 (25.2)
Mean monthly sunshine hours	51.6	69.4	113.9	148.5	201.0	204.8	201.0	195.6	151.4	114.4	69.3	46.6	1,567.5
Source: Met Office

== Demography ==
Maidstone compared
	Maidstone	Maidstone district	England
Population	75,070	138,948	49,138,831
Foreign born	5.9%	5.2%	9.2%
White	97%	97%	91%
Asian	1.5%	1.1%	4.6%
Black	0.4%	0.2%	2.3%
Christian	74%	76%	72%
Muslim	0.8%	0.5%	3.1%
Hindu	0.7%	0.5%	1.1%
Source: 2001 UK census

In the 2001 UK census, Maidstone town wards had a population of 75,070, a density of 28 residents per hectare. The town had 31,142 households, of which 38% were married couples, 29% were individuals, 10% were cohabiting couples, and 9% were single-parent families. 14% of households had someone living alone of pensionable age.

The ethnicity was 96.6% white, 0.9% mixed race, 0.3% Chinese, 1.5% other Asian, 0.4% Black and 0.3% other. The place of birth was 94.1% United Kingdom (91.4% England), 0.6% Republic of Ireland, 0.6% Germany, 1.3% other European countries, 1.7% Asia, 0.9% Africa and 0.8% elsewhere.

Religion was 73.9% Christian, 0.8% Muslim, 0.7% Hindu, 0.3% Buddhist, 0.14% Sikh and 0.11% Jewish. 15.8% had no religion, 0.6% had an alternative religion, and 7.7% did not state their religion.

== Economy ==
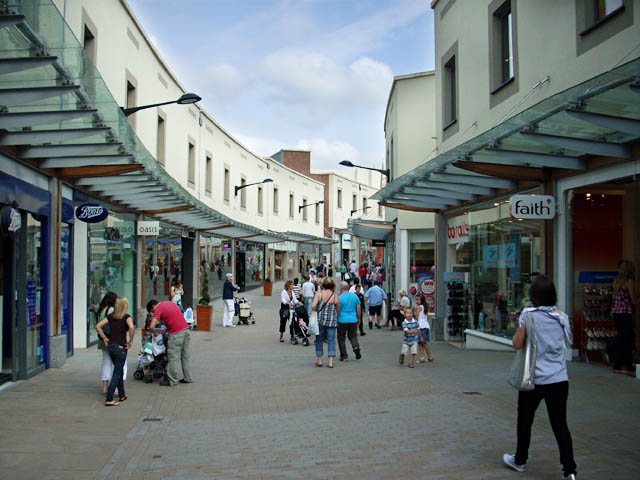
Fremlin Walk

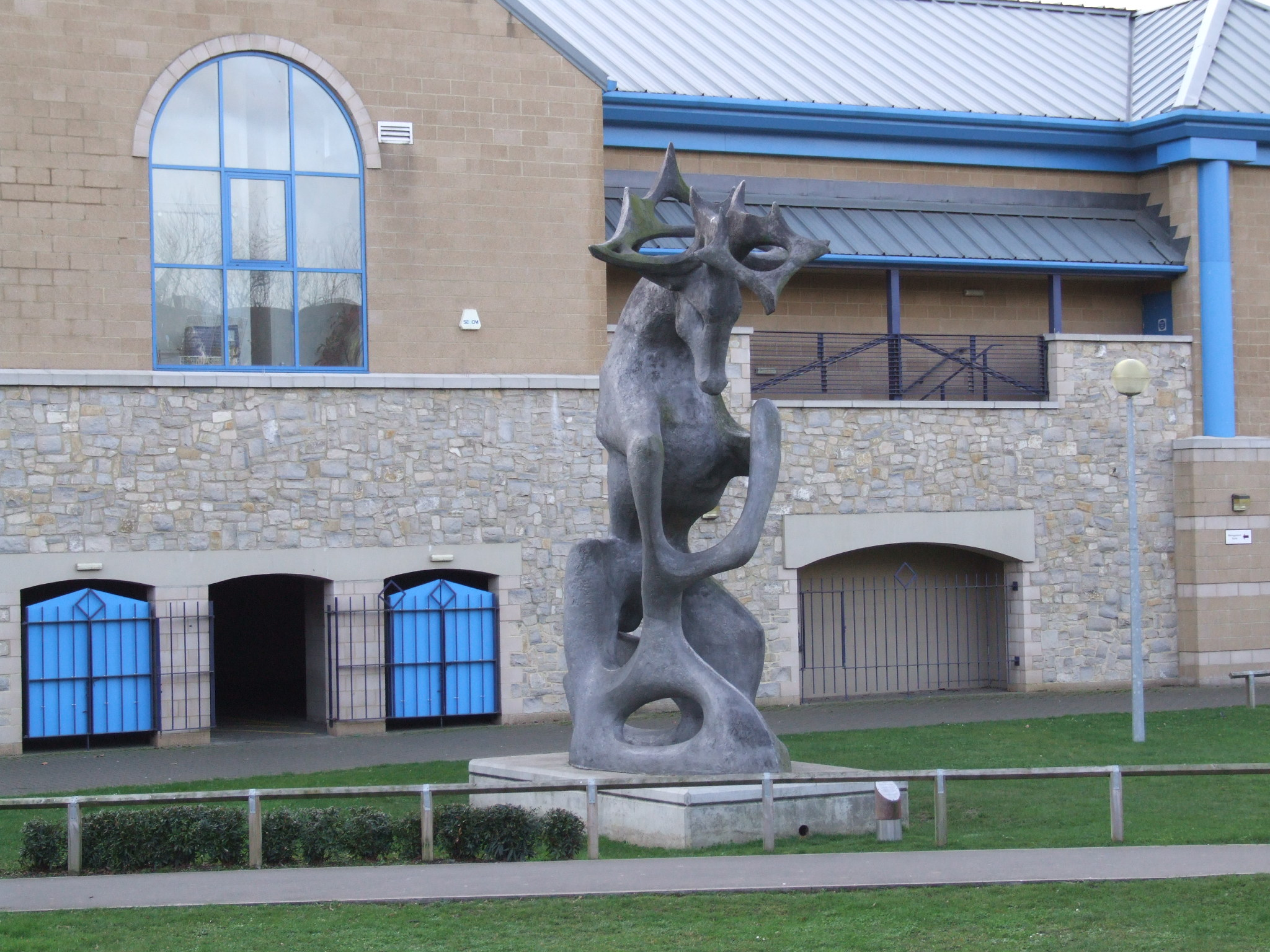
The Stag, by Edward Bainbridge Copnall, outside the Lockmeadow Centre

=== Industry ===
Until 1998, the Sharps toffee factory (later part of Cadbury Trebor Basset), was in central Maidstone and provided a significant source of employment.

Loudspeaker manufacturer KEF was founded in 1961 on the premises of the metal-working operation Kent Engineering & Foundry (hence KEF). KEF still occupies the same river-bank site. In the late 1990s KEF manufactured a loudspeaker called "the Maidstone".

The town centre has the largest office centre in the county and the area is a base for the paper and packaging industry. Many high-technology firms have set up in surrounding business parks.

Southern Water and Mid Kent Water operate the Maidstone water system.

Maidstone Borough Corporation began construction of Maidstone power station at Fairmeadow in 1900 and supplied electricity from 1901, firstly for street lighting then other uses. Upon nationalisation of the electricity industry in 1948 ownership of the station passed to the British Electricity Authority and then to the Central Electricity Generating Board. In 1966 the power station had a generating capacity of 13.125 MW and delivered 6,921 MWh of electricity. The CEGB later closed the station and it was demolished in 1973.

=== Shopping ===
The town is ranked in the top five shopping centres in the south-east of England for shopping yields and, with more than one million square feet of retail floor space, in the top 50 in the UK. Much of this space is located in the two main shopping centres in the town, the 535,000 square feet (49,700 m^{2}) The Mall Maidstone (previously known as The Chequers Centre and, prior to that, The Stoneborough) and the 32,500 square metres (350,000 sq ft) Fremlin Walk which opened in 2005.

Other recent developments include the riverside Lockmeadow Centre, with a multiplex cinema, restaurants, nightclubs (now a trampoline park), and the town's market square. The leisure industry is a key contributor with the night-time economy worth £75m per annum.

== Employment ==
In the 2001 UK census, 45.2% of residents aged 16–74 were employed full-time, 12.7% part-time, 7.6% self-employed and 2.5% unemployed, while 2.3% were students with jobs, 3.0% without jobs, 12.9% retired, 6.6% looking after home or family, 3.8% permanently sick or disabled and 3.2% economically inactive for other reasons. These figures were roughly in line with the national average.

Employment, by industry, was 19% retail; 13% real estate; 11% manufacturing; 9% construction; 7% transport and communications; 10% health and social work; 8% public administration; 7% education; 5% finance; 4% hotels and restaurants; 1% agriculture; 1% energy and water supply; and 5% other. Compared to national figures, Maidstone had a high percentage of workers in construction and public administration, and a low percentage in agriculture.

According to the Office for National Statistics estimates, the average gross income of households between April 2001 and March 2002 was £595 per week (£31,000 per year).

== Education ==
The town is served by 15 secondary schools, 23 primary schools, and two special schools. Non-selective secondary schools include Cornwallis Academy, The Maplesden Noakes School, New Line Learning Academy, St Augustine Academy, St. Simon Stock School and Valley Park School. Grammar schools serving the town include Maidstone Grammar School, Invicta Grammar School, Maidstone Grammar School for Girls and Oakwood Park Grammar School.

Alumni of the oldest school, Maidstone Grammar School (founded 1549), include James Burke, television presenter, and Lord Beeching, of the British railway cuts of the 1960s. William Golding, author of Lord of the Flies was once a teacher at the school.

The University for the Creative Arts (formerly Kent Institute of Art & Design) at which Turner Prize nominated artist Tracey Emin, fashion designer Karen Millen and television personality and artist Tony Hart studied, has a campus at the Maidstone TV Studios.

In the 2001 census, 15.7% of residents aged 16–74 had a higher education qualification or equivalent, below the national average of 19.9%. 27.5% had no academic qualifications, compared to the national figure of 28.9%.

== Transport ==
Southeastern operates services at three railway stations:

- Maidstone East, on the secondary line between London Victoria and Ashford
- Maidstone West and Maidstone Barracks on the Medway Valley Line, with services between Strood and Paddock Wood.

Bus services are provided by Arriva Kent and Surrey, Nu-Venture and Stagecoach South East. Routes connect the town with Ashford, Canterbury, Gillingham and Tunbridge Wells.

The following roads connect Maidstone with nearby locations:

- A20/M20 to London, Sevenoaks and Ashford
- A26 to Tonbridge
- A229 to the Medway Towns and Hastings
- A249 to Sheerness.

== Religion ==
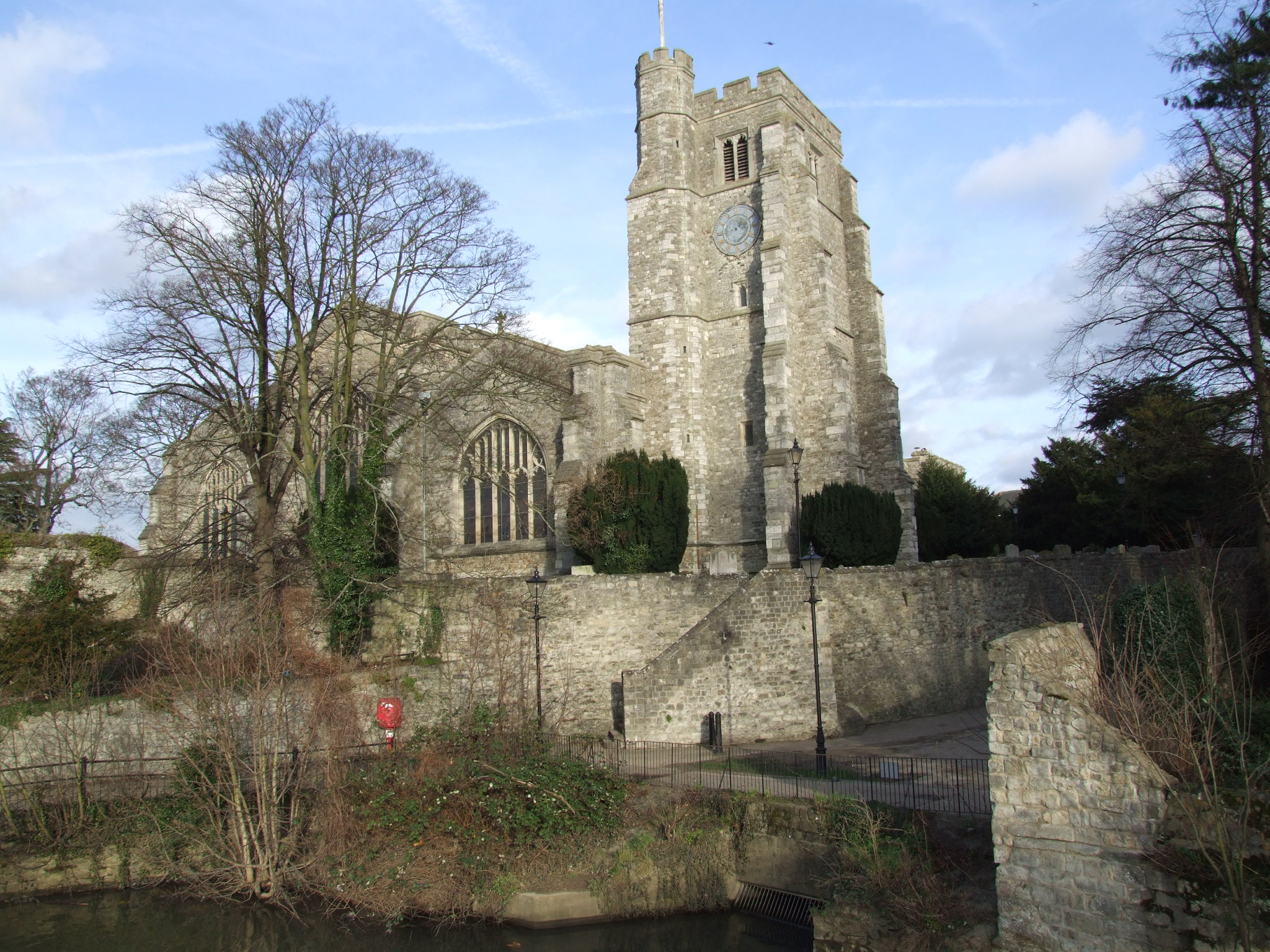
All Saints' Church

In 2001, religions were 73.9% Christian, 0.8% Muslim, 0.7% Hindu, 0.3% Buddhist, 0.14% Sikh and 0.11% Jewish. 15.8% had no religion, 0.6% had an alternative religion, while 7.7% did not state their religion.

All Saints' Church in the town centre was the collegiate church of the College of All Saints built in 1395 next to the Archbishop's Palace. It contains a monument to Sir Jacob Astley, the Royalist Civil War soldier and a memorial to Lawrence Washington, great-uncle of George Washington's great-great-grandfather, that includes the stars and stripes in the family coat of arms The college, the church, the palace and the palace's tithe barn are all Grade I listed buildings.

Jubilee Church is an independent Maidstone-based Christian church which forms partnerships not only in Kent, but in Canada and Ukraine. In Ukraine, it has held events with Ockert Potgieter of the Light of the World Church.

== Culture ==
=== Twinning ===
- Maidstone is twinned with Beauvais in Picardy, France.

A Twinning Association Committee meets every month. It organises annual trips to the Jeanne Hachette Festival in Beauvais. An annual sporting weekend is also held, with Maidstone and Beauvais taking it in turns to host the event.

=== Radio ===
The BBC Local Radio station which broadcasts to the town is BBC Radio Kent, on 96.7 FM.

There are several radio stations based in the town, or which broadcast to it. KMFM Maidstone, formerly CTR 105.6, is the local commercial station. It used to broadcast from studios on Mill Street, however now broadcasts from the studios of sister station KMFM Medway in Strood.

Hospital Radio Maidstone, which broadcasts from Maidstone Hospital, started broadcasting in 1963.

Invicta FM, now Heart South, used to broadcast from Canterbury but had a second studio in Earl Street.

=== Television ===
Local news and television programmes are provided by BBC South East and ITV Meridian. Television signals are received from the Bluebell Hill TV transmitter on the crest of the North Downs which is situated north of the town.

The Maidstone Studios, formerly called TVS Television Centre, is the UK's largest independent television studio complex. It is based at Vinters Park on New Cut Road. The studio complex first opened in late 1982, providing broadcasting and production output for Television South (TVS). The site was also used as a regional office and a news gathering hub, broadcasting the South East daily edition of Coast to Coast. TVS continued to use Maidstone until the end of their franchise, which they lost in 1991.

The studio complex is now home to two studios. Studio One, with 12,000 sqft space, is the flagship studio and has seen many national TV programmes such as Supermarket Sweep, Take Me Out and Catchphrase.

=== Newspapers ===
The town is served by the local newspaper, Kent Messenger which publishes on Fridays.

=== Theatre ===
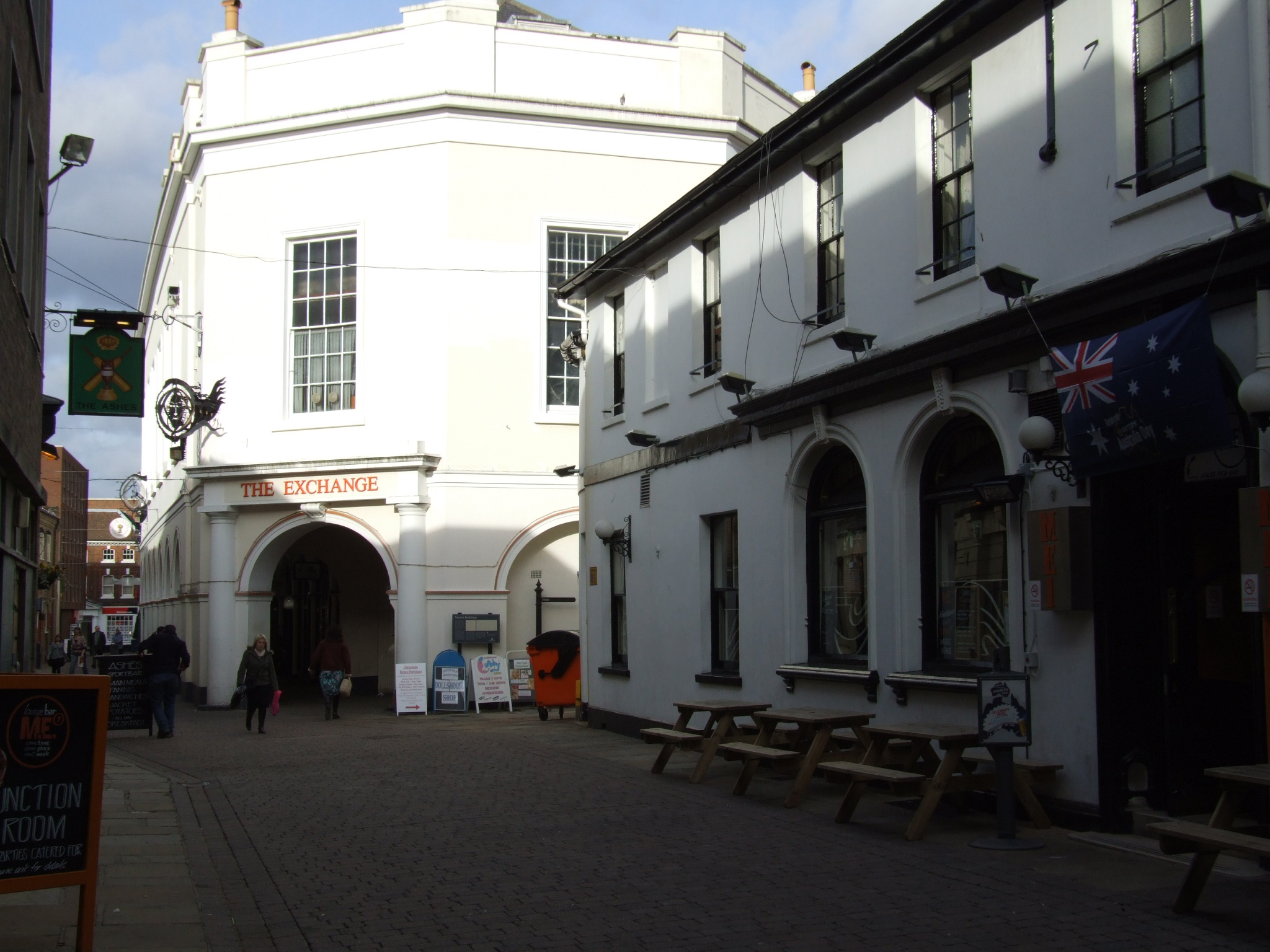
The Exchange

Theatres include the Hazlitt Theatre; RiverStage; The Exchange Studio (previously the Corn Exchange); and the Hermitage Millennium Amphitheatre.

=== Literature ===
Maidstone is mentioned several times in Ian Fleming's 1955 James Bond novel, Moonraker. Villain Hugo Drax passes through King Street and Gabriels Hill and later stops at the Thomas Wyatt Hotel.

Writer Jack London recounts his visit to Maidstone in his 1903 book The People of the Abyss. Whilst living in the slums of London in the summer of 1902, he heads to Maidstone in search of hop-picking work up the London Road. He finds lodgings with a "Sea Wife" living in the poor quarter of Maidstone, and persuades her and her husband to let him stay in their front room.

=== Museums ===
==== Maidstone Museum & Bentlif Art Gallery ====
Maidstone Museum & Art Gallery is located in the town centre, near to the Fremlin Walk shopping centre. Operated by Maidstone Borough Council, the museum is open seven days a week, with free admission. The Museum & Art Gallery has a large collection of over 600,000 objects, including collections about ancient Egyptians; archaeology; costume; ethnography; biology; fine and decorative art; geology; Japanese decorative arts and prints; and local history. It also hosts temporary exhibitions.

The core of the museum is located within the former Chillington Manor, an Elizabethan manor house completed in 1577. New wings were added to the building in the 19th century. A striking gold-coloured extension was added in 2012 which has extended the display space by 40% but the modern design has divided opinion.

==== Kent Life ====
Kent Life, formerly the Museum of Kent Life, is an open-air rural life museum at Sandling, near Allington Locks, on the east bank of the River Medway. The museum includes a collection of historic buildings including a chapel, village hall and old houses. It also includes displays on agriculture, including a farm yard and farm animals.

==== Tyrwhitt-Drake Museum of Carriages ====
The Tyrwhitt-Drake Museum of Carriages is located in a Grade I Listed tithe barn near the Archbishop's Palace. The museum was established by Sir Garrard Tyrwhitt-Drake, a former mayor of Maidstone, who amassed a large collection of horse-drawn vehicles.

=== Martian crater ===
Following the NASA tradition of naming craters on Mars after small towns, the Maidstone crater was added to the list of Martian geographical features in 1976.

== Sport ==
=== Football ===
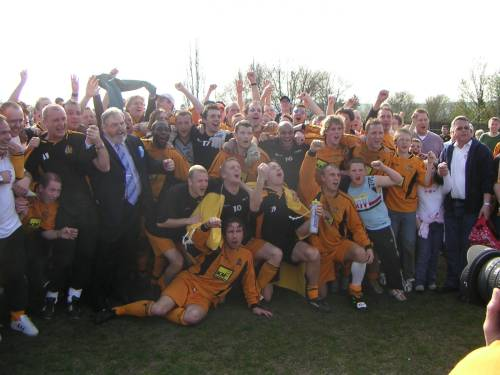
Maidstone celebrate winning the Kent League title in 2006

Maidstone United was formed in 1897. The club gained promotion to the Football League in 1989, from non-league football. The club could not bring its London Road Ground up to Football League standards so it ground-shared at Dartford's Watling Street stadium and played its games there. It went bankrupt in 1992. A new club was formed and made its way from the Kent County League Division 4 to the Isthmian (Ryman) Premier Division, in 2014 being in the Ryman Premier Division. The club moved into the new Gallagher Stadium at James Whatman Way in summer 2012. Maidstone United currently play in the National League South, the second highest non-league division and the sixth tier of English football. In 2024, Maidstone defeated Championship team Ipswich Town in the 4th round of the FA Cup, being the lowest league team to reach the 5th round of the FA Cup since 1977.

=== Hockey ===
Maidstone Hockey Club is one of the oldest hockey clubs in the country, founded in 1878. For the 2011–12 season, the Ladies' 1st XI play in the National League East Conference, having won the East Premier League the previous season, and the Men's 1st XI play in the South Hockey League 1st XI Premier League Division 2. The Men's and Women's 1st squad were both represented in the Indoor England Hockey League Division 2, with the Men having previously won the Division 2 title in 2008–09. The club has seven men's and four women's sides playing in national, regional and county leagues.

=== Rugby union ===
Maidstone Rugby Football Club is one of the older rugby clubs in England, having been founded in 1880. The club runs 6 senior men's sides and a junior section. In the 2014–15 season they were unbeaten and won the National RFU Intermediate Cup at Twickenham Stadium.

=== Cricket ===
Kent County Cricket Club used Mote Park as a regular out-ground for some 150 years until 2005. Mote Park is the town's largest park and includes a number of recreational and sport facilities. The Lashings World XI exhibition cricket team is based in Maidstone and has included a number of high-profile professional cricketers.

=== Other sport ===
Maidstone Sailing Club sails on Mote Park lake. Maidstone also has a rowing club, a martial arts school, a tennis club, an athletics club, an American football team and a basketball club.

A baseball team, the Kent Mariners, is based in the town, playing in the BBF AA South division.

== Notable people ==
- Dan Abnett (born 1965), author
- William Alexander (1767–1816), painter
- Edward Balston (1817–1891), head master of Eton College
- Angela Barnes (born 1976), actress and comedian, grew up in Maidstone.
- Robert Blatchford (1851–1943), socialist campaigner, journalist and author
- Daniel Blythe (born 1969), author
- Julius Brenchley (1816–1873), explorer
- Chris Broad (born 1990), YouTuber, filmmaker and podcast host
- Georgina Campbell (born 1992), actress
- Michael Chaplin (1943 - 2026), artist and author
- Graham Chapman (1941–1989), actor
- Bill Cockcroft (living), former Chief Scout Commissioner of England
- Mackenzie Crook (born 1971), actor
- Thomas Culpeper (c. 1514–1541), purported lover of Queen Catherine Howard
- David Edwards (born 1962), journalist
- Jesse Ellis (1846–1916), engineer and pioneer of steam wagons
- Ernest Elmore (1901–1957), novelist
- Robert Fisk (1946–2020), journalist and author
- Guy Fletcher (born 1960), musician
- Samantha Giles (born 1971), actress
- Albert Goodwin (1845–1932), artist
- Tamsin Greig (born 1966), actress
- Alexander Henry Green (1832–1896), geologist
- William Grocyn (c. 1446–1519), theologian
- Christopher Newman Hall (1816–1902), priest and anti-slavery campaigner
- Tony Hart (1925–2009), artist and TV presenter
- William Hazlitt (1778–1830), essayist and critic
- Edmund Walker Head (1805–1868), colonial administrator
- Noel Howlett (1902–1984), actor
- John Jenkins (1592–1678), composer
- Bill Lewis (born 1953), artist, poet and mythographer
- Malcolm MacDonald (1901–1981), diplomat and politician
- Carol McGiffin (born 1960), broadcaster
- John Monckton (1832–1902), lawyer, Town Clerk of London 1873–1902
- Nicky Moore (1947–2022), rock and blues musician
- Frederic J. Mouat (1816–1897), surgeon
- Diana Noel, 2nd Baroness Barham (1762–1823), philanthropist and abolitionist
- John Orrell (1934–2003), theatre historian and professor
- Anthony Pawson (1952–2013), microbiologist
- Mike Ratledge (1943–2025), musician
- William Shipley (1715–1803), founder of the Royal Society of Arts
- James Smith (1871–1946), recipient of the Victoria Cross
- Ralph Steadman (born 1936), illustrator
- Simon Stock (13th c.), monk and saint
- Tallulah, (1948–2008), DJ
- George Tolhurst (1927–1977), composer
- Garrard Tyrwhitt-Drake (1881–1964), twelve times mayor of Maidstone and owner of Maidstone Zoo
- Shaun Williamson (born 1965), actor
- Peter Wolfe (born 1968), musician
- William Woollett (1735–1785), engraver
- Nan Youngman (1906–1995), painter
- John Watkins (1834–1902), Mormon pioneer and Utah architect
- Robert Webb (born 1972),
- James Whatman (1702–1759), paper maker and mill owner
- Susanna Whatman (1753–1814), daughter-in-law of James Whatman (senior) and mistress of Turkey Court
- Thomas Wyatt (1503–1542), poet and politician

=== Sport ===
- Jon Harley (born 1979), association footballer
- Thomas Balston (born 1822), cricketer
- Kiern Jewiss (born 2002), racing driver
- Doug Loft (born 1986), footballer
- Natalie O'Connor (born 1982), British international trampoline athlete
- Joe Pigott (born 1993), footballer
- Matthew Richardson (born 1999), British-Australian track cyclist
- Alessia Russo (born 1999), footballer
- Katie Startup (born 1999), footballer
- Andy Townsend (born 1963), footballer
- Scott Wagstaff (born 1990), footballer

== See also ==
- Borough of Maidstone
- History of Maidstone
- Old Kentish Sign Language
- Listed buildings in Maidstone
