= Fremlin's Brewery =

Brewery in Maidstone, Kent, England

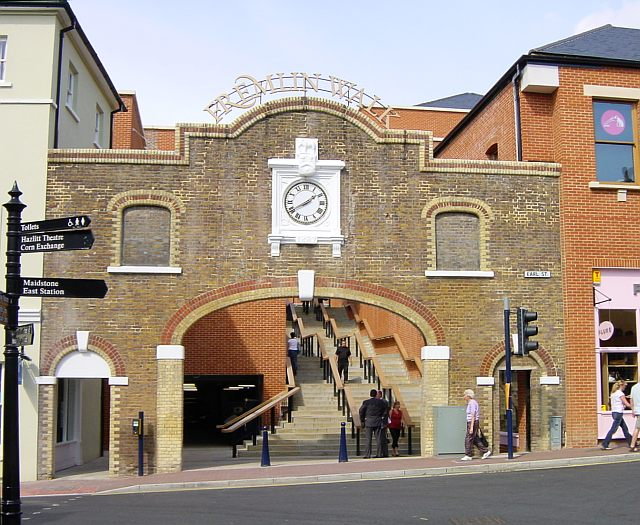
The former main entrance to Fremlin's Brewery on Earl Street, Maidstone, now part of the Fremlin Walk shopping centre

Fremlin's was a brewery in Maidstone, Kent, England. It was established by Ralph Fremlin in 1861, who eschewed the pub trade and focused on bottled beer, on religious grounds. The beer was known for the distinctive elephant logo on the bottles. The brewery expanded to become the largest in Kent, before going into decline after being purchased by Whitbread in 1967.

== History ==
=== Expansion ===
The original brewery was founded on Earl Street, Maidstone, around 1790. It was bought by Ralph Fremlin in 1861, who rebuilt the premises, and expanded the production plant along the street, taking over a pub further down which was demolished. As well as being in charge of production, Fremlin managed all engineering and accounts. He did not approve of public houses and sold the ten premises associated with the brewery at that point. Instead, he produced bottled beer for the home trade, believing it could be consumed in moderation more easily, delivering bottles door-to-door via horse and cart. The beer was a success, and Fremlin's expanded to produce lager and "National Temperance Ale", along with establishing a London branch on Buckingham Palace Road by 1894. Fremlin's was the first British brewery to mass-produce beer in bottles and jars, which became a key factor in their growth.

A devout Christian, Fremlin ran bible classes for the brewery's employees, funded local churches, and was chairman of the local school board. He did not supply beer to pubs as he felt the typical Victorian beerhouse was ethically wrong. The company logo was an elephant standing on top of the family's coat of arms, which appeared on bottles and glasses. It was used because of the Fremlin's association with the East India Company.

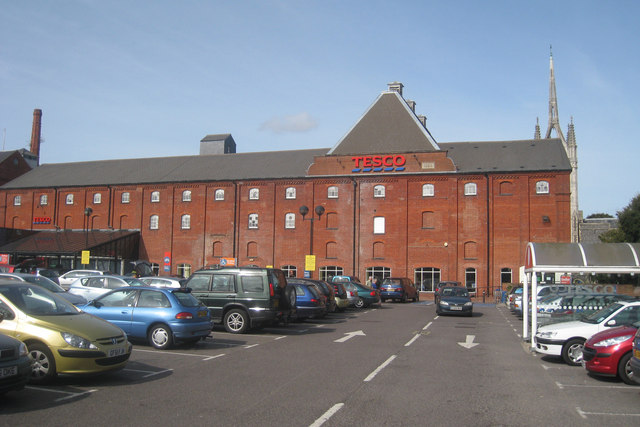
Fremlin's Faversham brewery, now a Tesco

Following Ralph Fremlin's death in 1910, the brewery was briefly run by his brother Richard until his death five years later. After World War I, it was necessary to revisit company policy, so a private limited company, Fremlin Bros Ltd was formed in 1920. The company reverted to the pub trade, buying up smaller breweries around Kent, and the Harris Browne Brewery in Barnet and Adams Brewery in Halstead, Essex. Fremlin's had become Kent's largest brewery by the mid-20th century, having acquired around 800 pubs and other licensed premises. In 1949, the company bought out George Beer & Rigden in Faversham, along with its production plant. It closed in 1954, with all brewing taking place in Maidstone, but reopened in 1961 to meet demand. In 1960, Fremlin's bought Frederick Leney & Sons of Wateringbury, taking over their brewery and 189 pubs.

=== Decline ===
In 1967, Fremlin's were bought out by Whitbread, who closed the Maidstone premises to brewing on 15 September 1972. It remained in use as a depot in the 1970s, before closing entirely. In 1978, much of the brewery's infrastructure connecting it to the River Medway was demolished in order to construct St Peter's Bridge and the A229 diversion around Maidstone town centre. The remainder of the Earl Street brewery was demolished in 1980.

The Earl Street site is now part of Fremlin Walk, a shopping centre. The Faversham plant remained open for some years afterwards, producing Whitbread Trophy beer. It closed in 1990. A Tesco store now occupies much of the site. The Wateringbury site closed down in 1981, but later reopened as a distribution centre for Whitbread.

Whitbread revived the name on several pubs in Kent in the 1980s, and revived some Fremlins ales, but the name was dropped in the late 1990s.

== Hodfellow and the origin of Gremlins ==
Carol Rose, in her book Spirits, Fairies, Leprechauns, and Goblins: An Encyclopedia, attributes the origin of the Gremlin of English folklore (malicious creatures said to be responsible for sabotaging aircraft) to a combination of the name of Grimm's Fairy Tales and the folklore surrounding Fremlin's beer; a favourite beverage of local Royal Air Force mechanics and pilots. Beginning as early as 1865, Fremlin's Brewery company tradition included the fabled existence of an unseen, ambivalent house spirit named Robin Hodfellow or Hödfellow; the name being a probable conflation of the woodland sprite Robin Goodfellow and the popular legend of the kobold Hödekin as recorded by folklorist Thomas Keightley.

Hodfellow was said to be a biersal, a type of kobold; (a sprite stemming from Germanic mythology and surviving into modern times in German folklore) that inhabits breweries and beer cellars. Hodfellow was said to ride a miniature elephant (or sometimes was himself a miniature elephant) and kept the brewery machinery in working order when he was paid his due (in beer) and alternatively wrought havoc in the machinery works when not remunerated appropriately. Brewery workers and even publicans were said to leave small jars or dishes of beer out to appease Hodfellow, a tradition that survived at least into the late 20th century in some Maidstone and Canterbury pubs.

Author Roald Dahl is credited with getting the gremlins known outside the Royal Air Force. He would have been familiar with the brewery and the myth, having lived in Kent with his family for ten years from the age of 13 before writing his first children's novel, The Gremlins, in which "Gremlins" were tiny men who lived on RAF fighter stations and who regularly caused technical problems and mechanical damage that could not otherwise be explained.

== Beers produced ==
- Three Star Bitter
- AK Mild
- Kent's Best
- English Stock Ale
