= William Grocyn =

English scholar

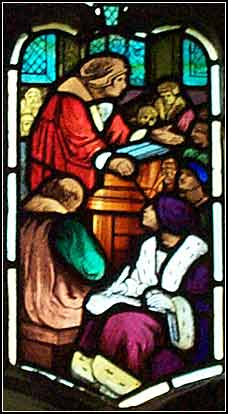
- William Grocyn lectures in Greek at Oxford (Victorian window in Worcester Cathedral)
- Born: c. 1446; Colerne, Wiltshire, Kingdom of England
- Died: 1519
- Education: Winchester College; New College, Oxford
- Occupation: Scholar
- Known for: friend of Erasmus

William Grocyn (c. 1446 – 1519) was an English humanist scholar and friend of Erasmus.

Grocyn was a prominent educator born in Colerne, Wiltshire. Intended for the church, he attended Winchester College and later New College, Oxford. He held various positions at the University of Oxford, including a fellowship at New College and a readership in divinity at Magdalen College. Grocyn visited Italy and studied Greek and Latin, later helping to promote Greek learning in England. Erasmus regarded him as a friend and preceptor.

Grocyn held several positions within the church, but his generosity led to financial difficulties. He died in 1519 and was buried in Maidstone. Although he did not leave many literary works, Erasmus praised his character and scholarship. Grocyn's legacy lives on in his namesake, the University of Oxford's chief lecturer on classical languages.

== Life ==
Grocyn was born at Colerne, Wiltshire. Intended by his parents for the church, he was sent to Winchester College, and in 1465 was elected to a scholarship at New College, Oxford. In 1467 he became a fellow, and among his pupils was William Warham, afterwards Archbishop of Canterbury. In 1479, Grocyn accepted the rectory of Newton Longville, in Buckinghamshire, but continued to live at Oxford. As reader in divinity at Magdalen College in 1481, he held a disputation with John Taylor, professor of divinity, in the presence of King Richard III; the king acknowledged his skill as a debater by the present of a deer and five marks. In 1485, Grocyn became prebendary of Lincoln Cathedral. In about 1488, he left England for Italy, and before his return in 1491 he had visited Florence, Rome and Padua, and studied Greek and Latin under Demetrius Chalcondyles and Poliziano. As lecturer at Exeter College, Oxford, he helped indoctrinate his countrymen in the new Greek learning.

Erasmus says in one of his letters that Grocyn taught Greek at Oxford before his visit to Italy. The Warden of New College, Thomas Chaundler, invited Cornelius Vitelli, then on a visit to Oxford, to act as praelector. This was about 1475, and as Vitelli was certainly familiar with Greek literature, Grocyn may have learned Greek from him. He seems to have lived in Oxford until 1499, but by the time his friend John Colet became dean of St Paul's in 1504 he was living in London. Grocyn was chosen by Colet to deliver lectures in St Paul's. Having at first denounced those who impugned the authenticity of the Hierarchia ecclesiastica ascribed to Dionysius the Areopagite, he was led to modify his views by further investigation, and openly declared that he had been mistaken. He also counted Thomas Linacre, William Lilye, William Latimer and Thomas More among his friends, and Erasmus – writing in 1514 – says that he was supported by Grocyn in London, and calls him "the friend and preceptor of us all".

Grocyn held several preferments, but his generosity to his friends involved him in continual difficulties, and though in 1506 he was appointed on Archbishop Warham's recommendation master or warden of the College of All Saints, Maidstone in Kent, he was still obliged to borrow from his friends, and even to pledge his plate as a security.

He died in 1519, and was buried in his collegiate church at Maidstone. Linacre acted as Grocyn's executor, and spent the money he received on alms for the poor and the purchase of books for poor scholars.

== Assessment ==
With the exception of a few lines of Latin verse on a lady who snubbed him, and a letter to Aldus Manutius at the head of Linacre's translation of Proclus's Sphaera (Venice, 1499), Grocyn left no literary proof of his scholarship. His proposal to translate Aristotle in company with Linacre and Latimer was never carried out. Anthony Wood assigns some Latin works to Grocyn, but on insufficient authority.

By Erasmus, he has been described as "vir severissimae castissimae vitae, ecclesiasticarum constitutionum observantissimus pene usque ad superstitionem, scholasticae theologiae ad unguem doctus ac natura etiam acerrimi judicii, demum in omni disciplinarum genere exacte versatus", "A man of a most stern and moral life; most observant of the decrees of the Church almost to the point of superstition; learned to his very fingertips in scholastic theology; and also by nature of the keenest judgment; finally, exactly versed in every kind of learning" (Declarationes ad censures facultatis theoiogiae Parisianae, 1522).

An account of Grocyn by Montagu Burrows appeared in the Oxford Historical Society's Collectanea (1890).

== Legacy ==
Grocyn gives his name to the University of Oxford's chief lecturer on Classical languages.

== See also ==
- List of Erasmus's correspondents
