= Teston Crossing Halt railway station =

Disused railway station in Kent, England

Coordinates: 51.2542°N 0.4439°E

Teston Crossing Halt
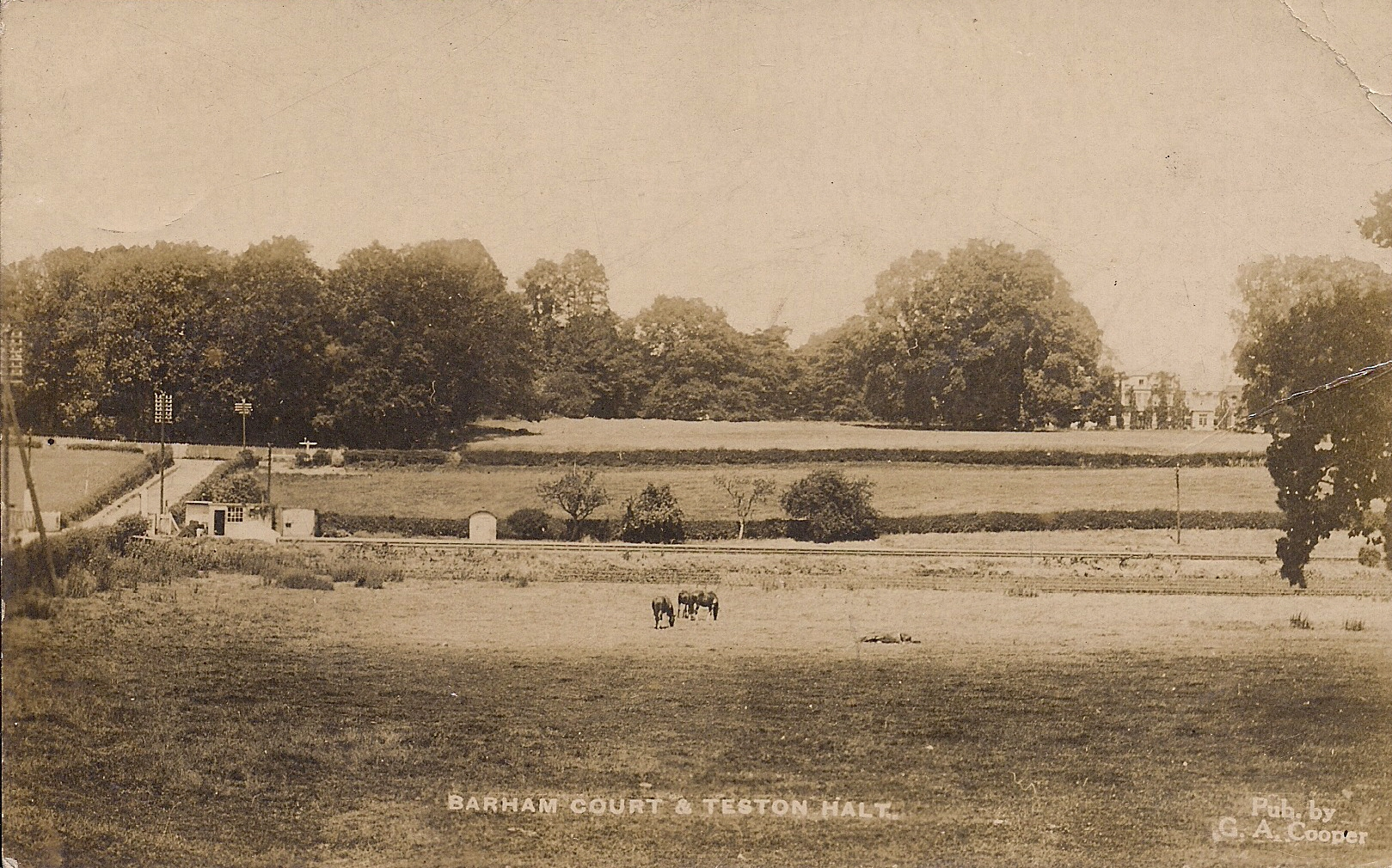

General information
- Location: Teston, Maidstone; England
- Grid reference: TQ707534
- Platforms: 2

Other information
- Status: Disused

History
- Pre-grouping: South Eastern and Chatham Railway

Key dates
- 1 September 1909: Opened
- 2 November 1959: Closed
Location

Teston Crossing Halt was situated on what is now the Medway Valley Line, south of Maidstone, in Kent, and served Teston and West Farleigh. It opened on 1 September 1909 and closed on 2 November 1959.

The site of Teston Crossing Halt – between East Farleigh and Wateringbury, is about 200 yards (180 m) from the mediaeval Teston Bridge taking foot and road passengers across the river, one of only four such bridges between Maidstone and Paddock Wood. The station was demolished after closure leaving no trace of its existence.

Preceding station	Historical railways	Following station
East Farleigh; Line and station open	South Eastern Railway; Medway Valley Line	Wateringbury; Line and station open

== Sources. ==
- Butt, R. V. J. (October 1995). The Directory of Railway Stations: details every public and private passenger station, halt, platform and stopping place, past and present (1st ed.). Sparkford: Patrick Stephens Ltd. ISBN 978-1-85260-508-7. OCLC 60251199. OL 11956311M.
- Kidner, R. W. (1985). Southern Railway Halts. Survey and Gazetteer. Headington, Oxford: The Oakwood Press. ISBN 0-85361-321-4.
