= Tithe Barn, Maidstone =

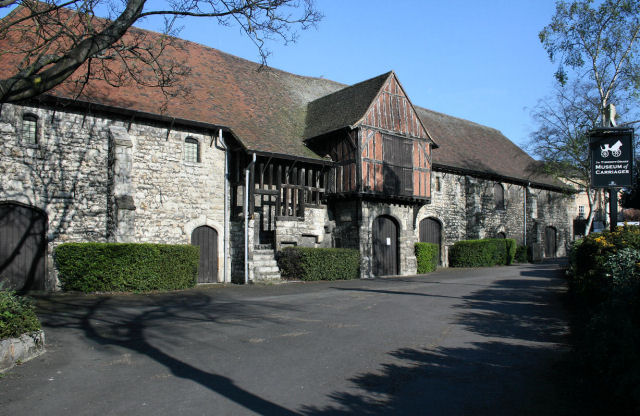

- Location within Kent
- 51°16′17″N 0°31′20″E
- Type: Barn and stables
- Location: Maidstone
- OS grid reference: TQ 76032 55481

History
- Built: 14th century

Site notes
- Area: Kent
- Owner: Maidstone Borough Council

Listed Building – Grade I
- Official name: The Tithe Barn
- Designated: 30 Jul 1951
- Reference no.: 1336233

Scheduled monument
- Official name: Tithe barn, Mill Street
- Designated: 5 January 1927
- Reference no.: 1005183

The Tithe Barn in Maidstone, Kent, is a large two-storey stone building on the east side of Mill Street. It was constructed in the 14th century as a tithe barn for the nearby Archbishop's Palace and was later used as the palace's stables. Construction is attributed to Archbishop Courtenay, who died in 1396. The barn is a Grade I listed building and a scheduled monument. It is home to the Tyrwhitt-Drake Museum of Carriages.

== Construction ==
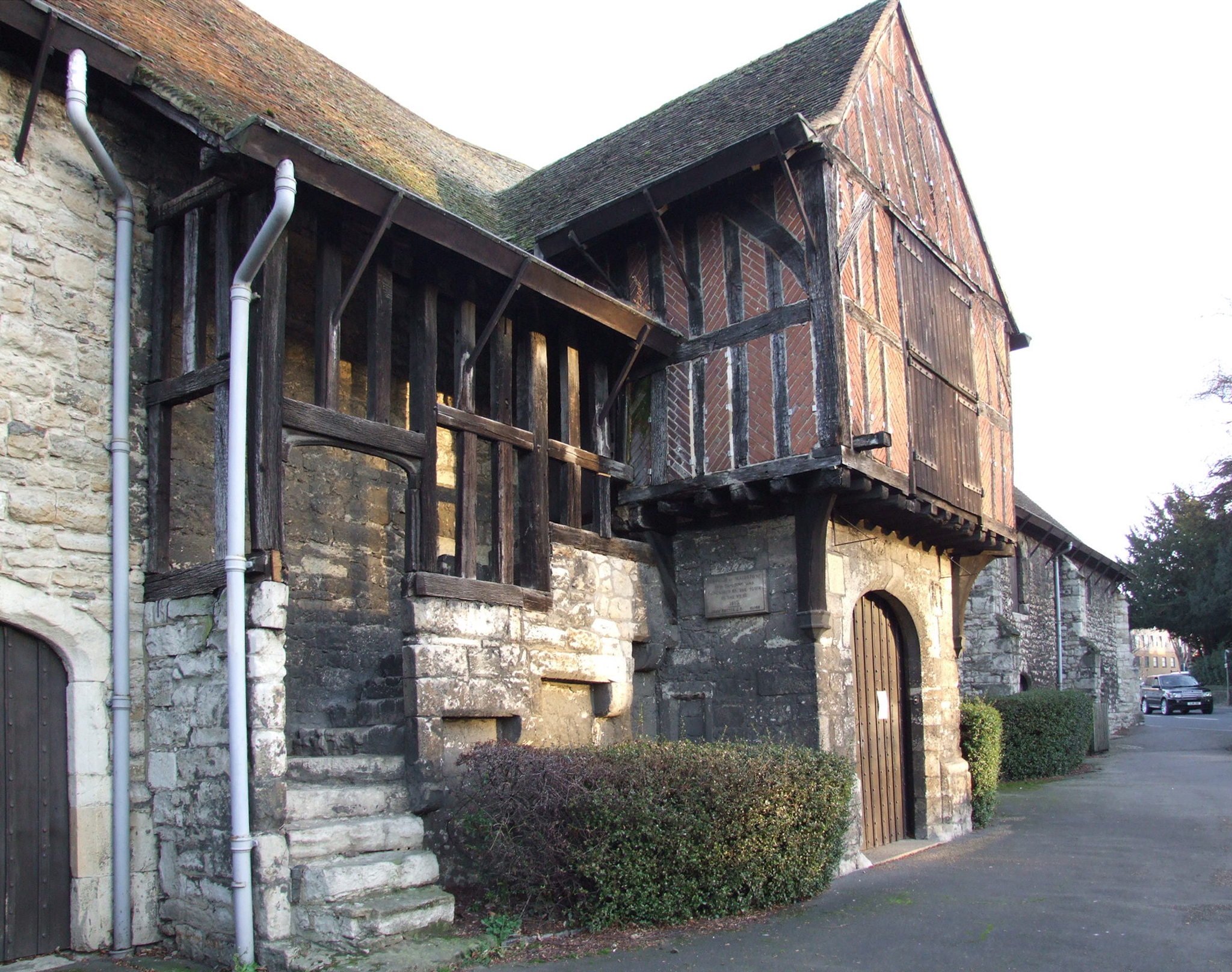
External stair to jettied upper floor of porch

The barn is constructed of roughly coursed rag-stone rubble walls in six buttressed bays. The west façade features a projecting two-storey half-timbered porch with stone ground floor construction and brick infilling at first floor level between the timber framing. The building has multiple doorways at both levels on the west façade with many small windows at high level and external stone steps leading up to the first floor of the porch. The tiled roof is of crown post construction and is hipped at both ends with a gable over the porch.

== Tyrwhitt-Drake Museum of Carriages ==
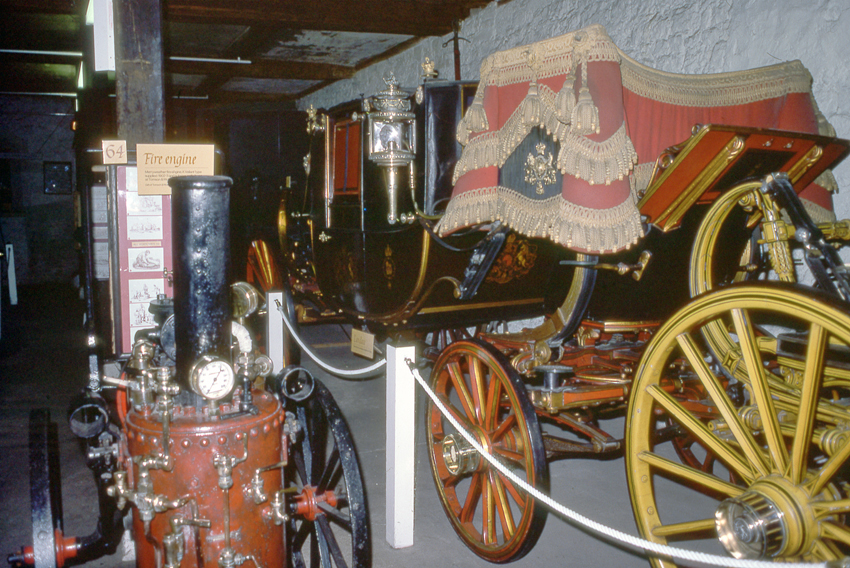
Queen Victoria's state landau

The Tyrwhitt-Drake Museum of Carriages was established by Mayor of Maidstone, Garrard Tyrwhitt-Drake, who amassed the collection of horse-drawn vehicles in the first part of the 20th century. Concerned about the effect higher costs and lower incomes were having on the carriage owning classes, leading to thousands of examples being broken up every year, he determined to preserve a selection of, preferably coach-built, non-mechanically propelled vehicles. The museum opened in 1946 and was the first carriage museum in Britain. Among its collection of 60 vehicles are sedan chairs, a hansom cab and Queen Victoria's state landau. In addition to the main exhibits there is a collection of model coaches ranging from children's toys to a scale model of Oliver Cromwell's coach.

The Museum is open from May to September each year on Wednesdays to Sundays and bank holidays.

== See also ==
- All Saints Church, Maidstone
- College of All Saints, Maidstone
- Grade I listed buildings in Maidstone
- List of scheduled monuments in Maidstone
