= Scheduled monuments in Maidstone =

Protected historic sites in Maidstone, Kent, England

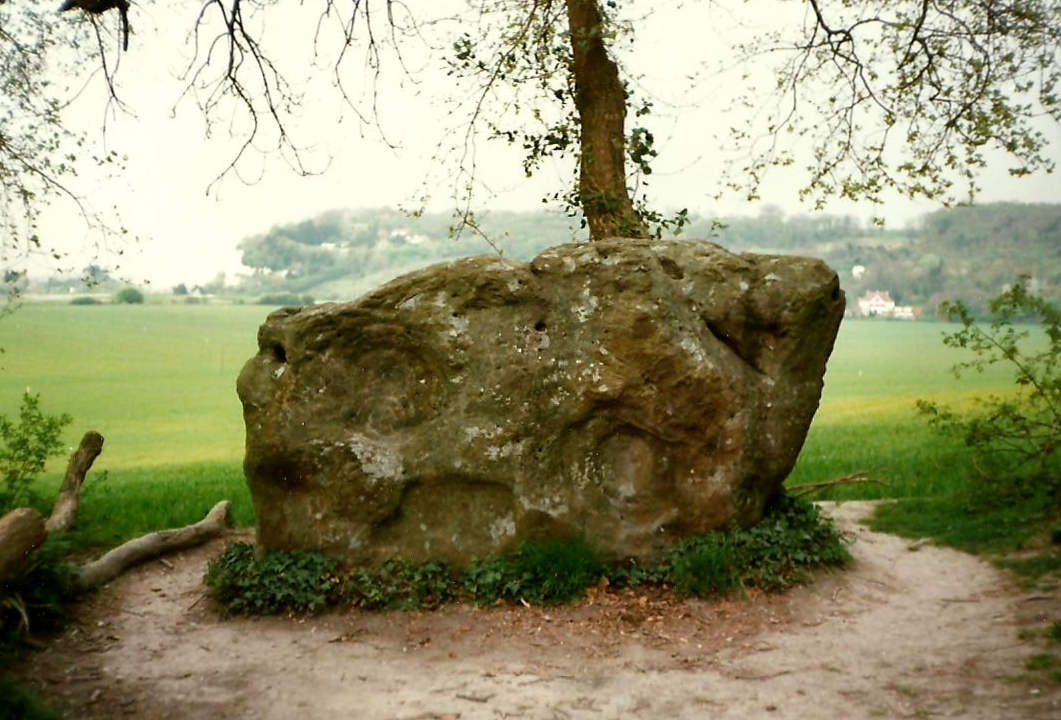
White Horse Stone is a megalith which possibly formed part of a Neolithic burial chamber.

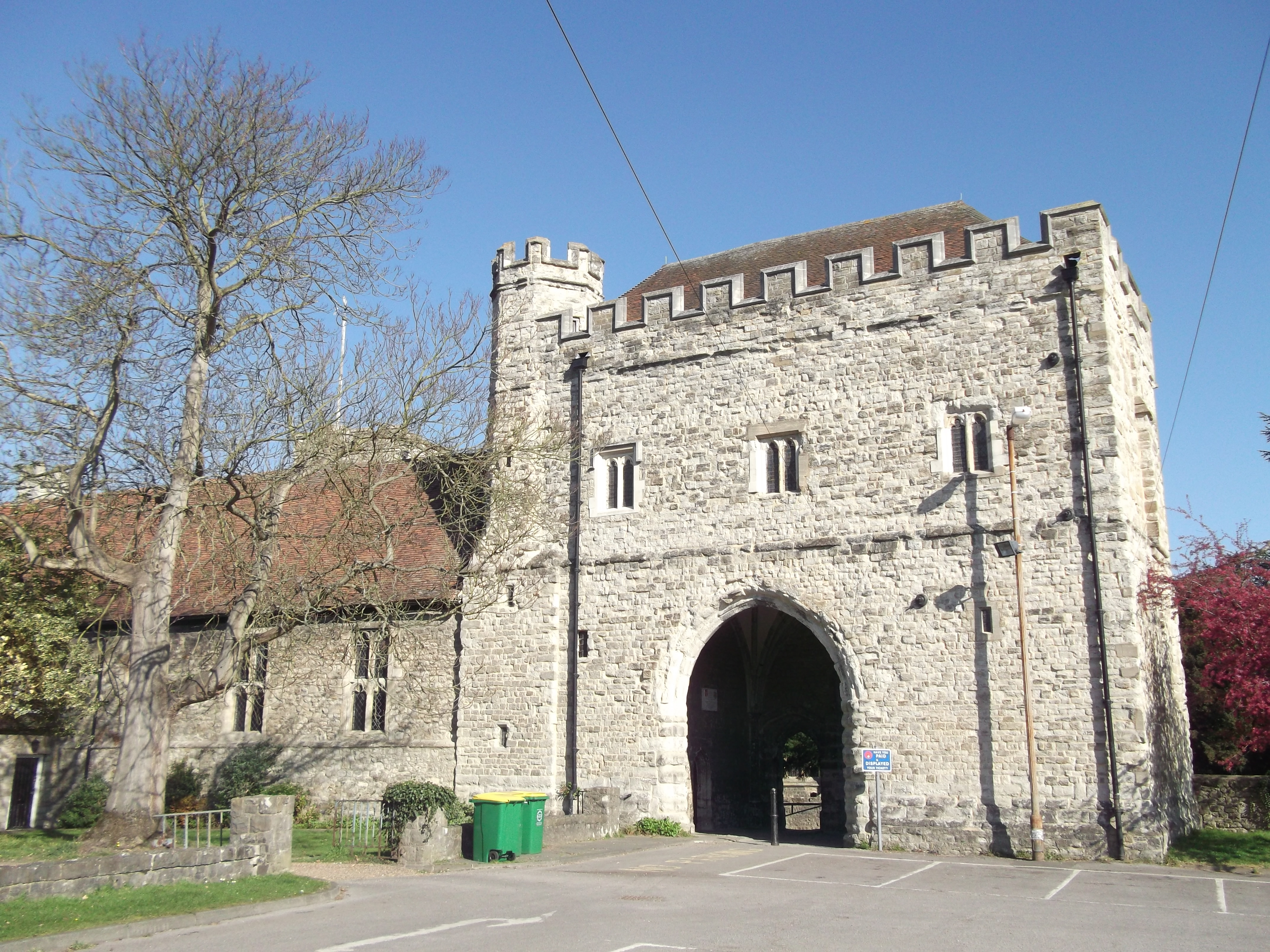
The College of All Saints (gateway shown), Maidstone contains a number of intact and ruined structures.

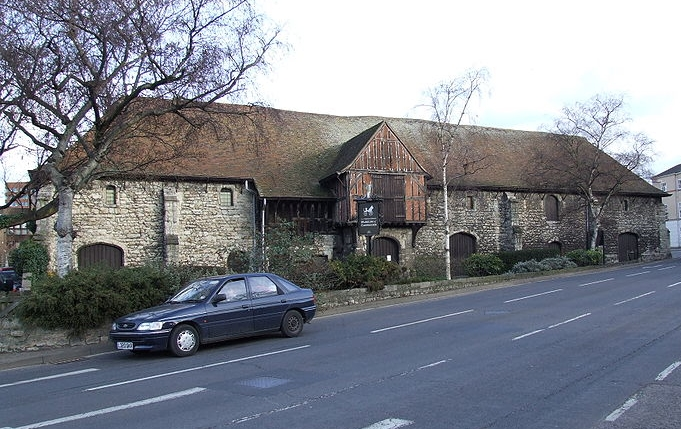
The Tithe Barn in Maidstone was constructed to serve the Archbishop's Palace.

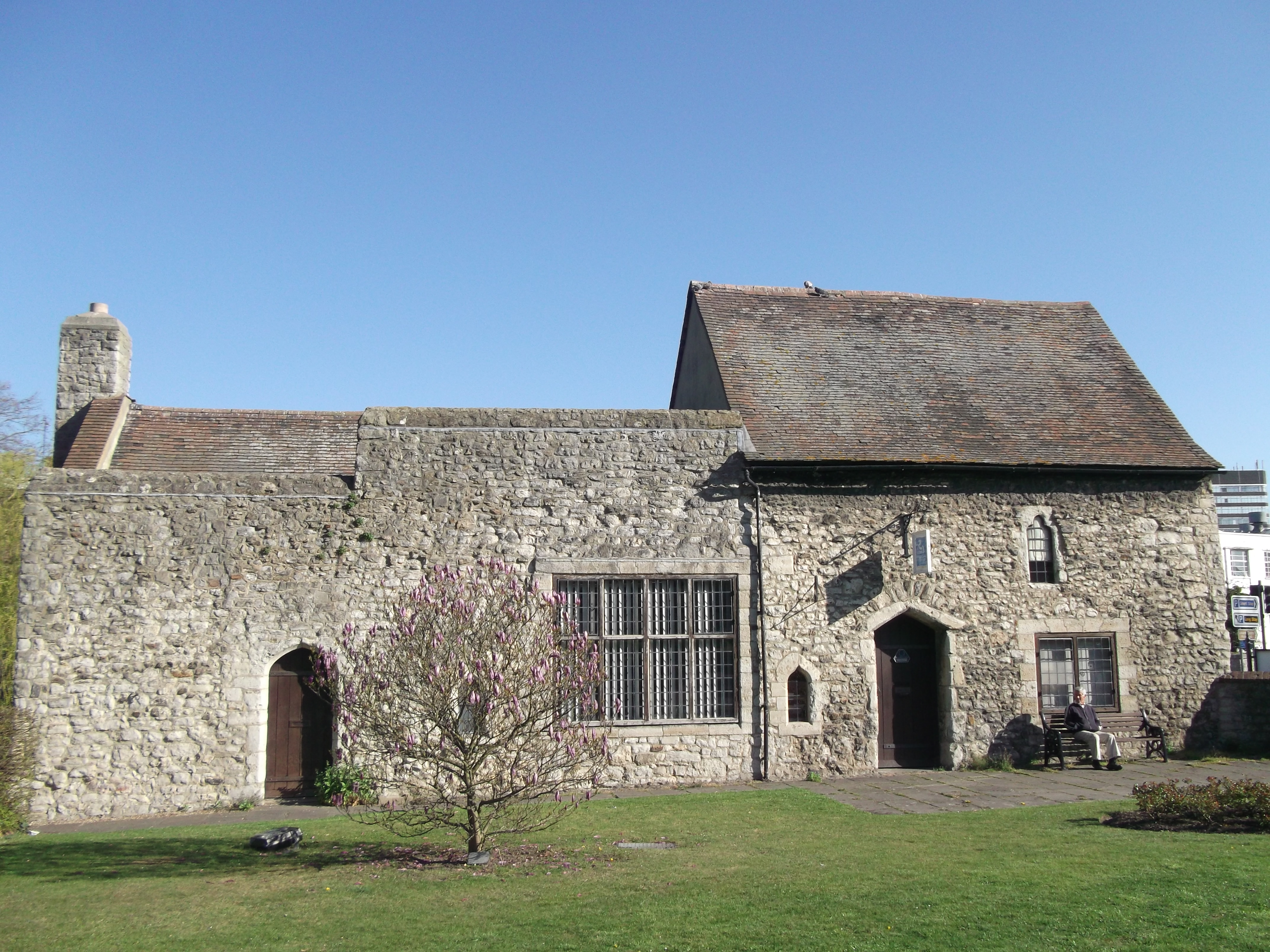
The Gatehouse to the Archbishop's Palace is in use today as an office building.

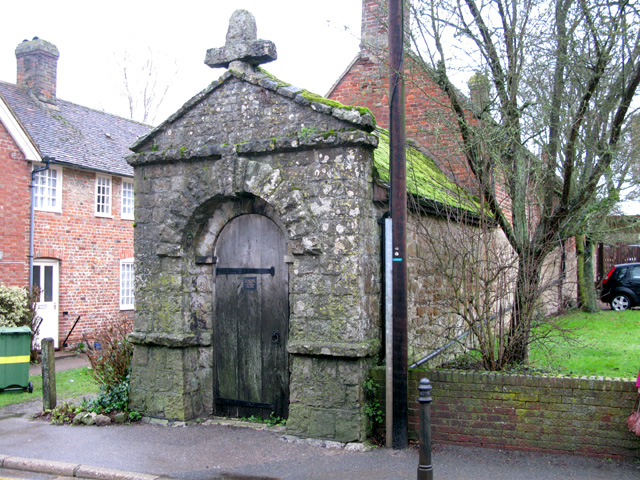
The Workhouse mortuary, Lenham, has also been used as the village gaol.

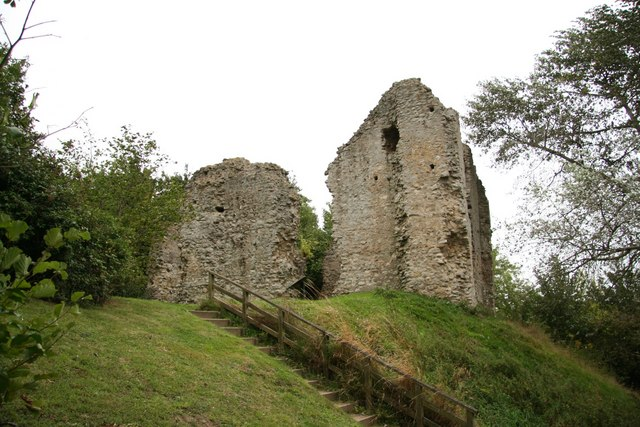
The remains of Sutton Valence Castle stand on an artificial mound.

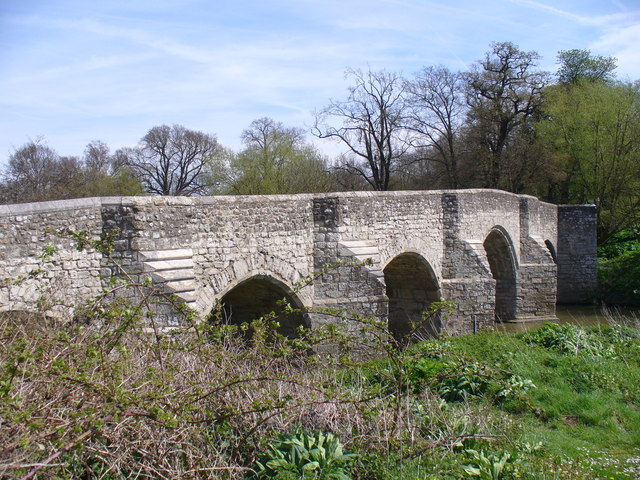
Teston Bridge, one of a number of medieval crossings over the River Medway and its tributaries that are scheduled monuments.

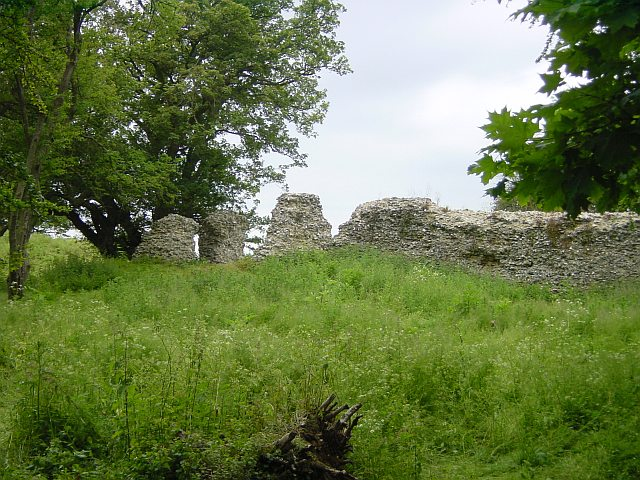
The ruins of Thurnham Castle on the North Downs

There are 27 scheduled monuments in Maidstone, Kent, England. In the United Kingdom, a scheduled monument is an archaeological site or historic building of "national importance" that has been given protection against unauthorised change by being placed on a list (or "schedule") by the Secretary of State for Digital, Culture, Media and Sport; Historic England takes the leading role in identifying such sites. Scheduled monuments are defined in the Ancient Monuments and Archaeological Areas Act 1979 and the National Heritage Act 1983. They are also referred to as scheduled ancient monuments. There are about 20,000 scheduled monument entries on the list and more than one site can be included in a single entry. While a scheduled monument can also be recognised as a listed building, (Note: Listed buildings are designated in accordance with three grades according to their architectural and historic importance. There are approximately 500,000 buildings on the list with about 2.5% designated Grade I (the most important status), 5.8% listed grade II* and the remaining 91.7% listed Grade II.) Historic England considers listed building status as a better way of protecting buildings than scheduled monument status. If a monument is considered by Historic England to "no longer merit scheduling" it can be removed from the schedule.

The borough of Maidstone is a local government district in the English county of Kent. The Maidstone district covers a largely rural area of 152 square miles (394 km^{2}) between the North Downs and the Weald with the town of Maidstone, the county town of Kent, in the north-west. The district had a population of approximately 166,400 in 2016. The monuments range in date from a Neolithic standing stone to a tiny 18th-century mortuary, but the majority are medieval.

Although mostly reduced to ruins and earthworks, the district contains the remains of four castles and five moated manor houses that are scheduled monuments. A number of monuments are buildings of ecclesiastical origin including an abbey, a priory and two tithe barns. The buildings associated with the former College of All Saints and the Archbishop's Palace in Maidstone town centre form the best-preserved group of scheduled monuments. Seven medieval bridges over the River Medway and its tributaries are also included.

== Monuments ==
Name	Remains	Date	Location	Coordinates	Description	Ref(s)
White Horse Stone	Megalith	Neolithic	Aylesford	51.315003°N 0.514852°E	A large standing sarsen (3 × 1.6 × 0.7 metres (9.8 × 5.2 × 2.3 ft)), reputedly the remains of a neolithic burial chamber, though there is no evidence of this except for its position. Some of the legendary status appears to have been transferred in the 20th century from the Lower White Horse Stone, destroyed in the 19th century.	
Moat at Coldbridge Farm	Earthworks	14th century	Boughton Malherbe	51.196066°N 0.694698°E; 51.199288°N 0.696589°E	The remains of Coldbridge Castle, a medieval manor house demolished c. 1559–78, are incorporated into an 18th or 19th century farmhouse. The manor house may have been demolished to provide stone for the construction of Boughton Place. The house had a pair of concentric moats, remnants of which remain. The site also contains a medieval paddock boundary and fish pond.	
Boughton Quarry camp	Earthworks	Iron Age	Boughton Monchelsea/ Loose	51.236099°N 0.528296°E	Remains of a U-shaped Pre-Roman earthwork enclosing approximately 28 acres (11 ha) on the southern slope of the Loose valley, probably a major Belgic oppidum.	
Boxley Abbey	Standing building and below ground remains	1143	Boxley	51.300385°N 0.525013°E	Remains of a mostly demolished Cistercian Abbey. The Grade I listed Boxley Abbey Barn is the only substantial remaining structure. The barn is on the Heritage at Risk Register due to its poor condition.	
East Farleigh Bridge	Stone bridge	14th century	East Farleigh	51.254437°N 0.484629°E	A medieval stone bridge of five spans crossing the River Medway. The bridge has substantial cutwaters on each side and the south approach has a large stone retaining wall across the low ground of the southern river bank. The bridge is also Grade I listed.	
East Sutton Manor	Earthworks	Medieval	East Sutton	51.213685°N 0.618313°E	A homestead moat in the grounds of East Sutton Park. Probably the site of East Sutton manor house, the moat is partly water filled.	
Sherway Bridge	Stone bridge	17th century	Headcorn	51.170916°N 0.67014°E	A brick bridge constructed in the 1680s and rebuilt in 1846.	
Ripple Manor	Earthworks	Medieval	Hollingbourne	51.279975°N 0.606394°E	The site of the medieval Ripple manor house, the moat and the island at its centre cover an area roughly 50 × 30 metres (164 × 98 ft) with the moat being 7–15 metres (23–49 ft) wide.	
Leeds Priory	Below ground remains and standing buildings	12th century	Leeds	51.247517°N 0.610777°E	The buried remains of both the Augustinian priory of St Mary and St Nicholas founded in 1119 and the 17th to 18th century mansion of the same name built on the site following the priory's demolition. A dovecote and another building are remains from the religious establishment. The site including the dovecote and other remains are on the Heritage at Risk register, due to their risk of collapse	
Lock-up or Mortuary	Standing building	Early 18th century	Lenham	51.237734°N 0.718466°E	A small stone building previously used as a mortuary for the local workhouse. Also a Grade II listed building.	
College of All Saints	Standing buildings, ruins and below ground remains	14th century	Maidstone	51.269687°N 0.521796°E	The rag-stone buildings of the college were mostly built in the 14th century in the Perpendicular style. The existing buildings served originally as the Master's house, College Gateway, refectory, dormitory and infirmary and the Master's Tower. A ruined gateway stands to the south separated from the other structures by 19th century almshouses. Buried remains underlie the modern buildings and car park on the site. The buildings are all listed structures.	
Gatehouse, Archbishop's Palace	Standing building	13th to 14th century	Maidstone	51.271374°N 0.521142°E	A two-storey building built of roughly-coursed rubble and timber framing on the east end. It served as an outbuilding for the adjacent Archbishop's Palace and is also a Grade II listed building.	
Len Bridge	Stone bridge	14th century	Maidstone	51.271524°N 0.52128°E	A stone bridge spanning the River Len close to its confluence with the River Medway. It has two narrow arches built to suit the needs of a watermill served from a mill pond on the upstream side. The span of a modern bridge has been built above, so that the ancient bridge is only visible from the gardens of the Archbishop's Palace. The bridge is also a Grade II listed building.	
Tithe Barn	Standing building	14th century	Maidstone	51.27128°N 0.522141°E	The barn is constructed of roughly coursed rag-stone rubble walls in six buttressed bays. The west façade features a projecting two-storey half-timbered porch with stone ground floor construction and brick infilling at first floor level between the timber framing. The barn served the nearby Archbishop's Palace and is also a Grade I listed building.	
Earthworks in Milbay's Wood	Earthworks	Medieval	Nettlestead	51.231159°N 0.393729°E	Earthwork that once formed the retaining embankments to a mill pond. Previously thought to be the embankments of an Iron Age hill fort.	
Moat at Lovehurst Manor	Earthworks	Medieval	Staplehurst	51.143811°N 0.540878°E	A homestead moat in the grounds of Lovehurst Manor. The site of the original manor house, the circular moat covers an area of approximately 65 × 70 metres (213 × 230 ft) and is water filled.	
Moot mound near Knox Bridge	Earthworks	Medieval	Staplehurst	51.137552°N 0.549097°E	Remains of a moot and surrounding ditch. Previously thought to be the motte of a Norman castle.	
Stockbury Castle	Earthworks	Norman	Stockbury	51.323726°N 0.648247°E	The remains of a motte-and-bailey castle. The motte has been flattened and part of its surrounding ditch infilled. The ditch around the bailey remains mostly intact.	
Sutton Valence Castle	Ruins	12th century	Sutton Valence	51.212313°N 0.597973°E	The remains of a 12th-century square keep built of rag-stone and standing on an artificial mound. It is about 12 metres (39 ft) square and the remains stand about 7 metres (23 ft) high, although the tower may originally have been almost three times that. A wall once surrounded the mound but disappeared long ago.	
Teston Bridge	Stone bridge	15th century	Teston	51.252983°N 0.447388°E	A medieval stone bridge over the River Medway with the centre three spans built in the 15th century or earlier. The rest was rebuilt in the 19th century. The bridge has substantial cutwaters on each side and is also Grade I listed.	
Binbury Castle	Ruins and earthworks	Norman/ Medieval	Thurnham	51.312206°N 0.598017°E	The remains of a motte-and-bailey castle of which the enclosing ditch of the motte is fairly well defined. Remains of a tower, part of a medieval manor house abut the castle site. The site is on the Heritage at Risk register due to its poor condition.	
Corbier Hall	Below ground remains	Late 14th century	Thurnham	51.284301°N 0.582057°E	Believed to be the site of Corbier Hall. Foundations and a cellar were discovered in 1862 with traces of a moat. Ploughing since the 19th century has removed all surface evidence and the remains are now only detectable as a crop mark.	
Thurnham Roman Villa	Below ground remains	Roman	Thurnham	51.285535°N 0.576676°E	Remains of buildings associated with a Roman villa, the main structure of which is undiscovered. Excavations in 1833, 1933 and 1958 found tessellated floors and rag-stone and flint walls. The site is located in a cutting of the M20 motorway.	
Thurnham Castle	Ruins	Norman/ Medieval	Thurnham	51.293983°N 0.591594°E	The remains of a motte-and-bailey castle located on a spur of the North Downs. The bailey is approximately 55 × 35 metres (180 × 115 ft). Parts of the flint walls remain in places with the largest section about 22 metres (72 ft) long and 3.5 metres (11 ft) high.	
Laddingford Bridge	Stone bridge	14th century	Yalding	51.213742°N 0.419345°E	A medieval stone bridge over the River Teise with two pointed arches built in the 14th century. The brick parapets are later additions.	
Twyford Bridge	Stone bridge	14th century	Yalding	51.222162°N 0.419686°E	A 40-yard (37 m) long medieval stone bridge with four arches over the River Medway and a causeway over the low ground next to the river. The bridge has massive cutwaters on each side.	
Yalding Bridge	Stone bridge	15th century	Yalding	51.223725°N 0.429322°E	A medieval stone bridge 455 feet (139 m) long across the River Beult and the adjacent flood plain in six arches up to 25 feet (7.6 m) span. The bridge is the longest medieval bridge in Kent.	

== See also ==
- Grade I listed buildings in Maidstone
- Grade II* listed buildings in Maidstone
