= Dunkirk (1958 film) =

1958 British war film by Leslie Norman

- DVD poster
- Directed by: Leslie Norman
- Written by: J. S. Bradford (book); Ewan Butler (book); David Divine (screenplay)
- Produced by: Michael Balcon
- Starring: John Mills; Richard Attenborough; Bernard Lee
- Cinematography: Paul Beeson
- Edited by: Gordon Stone
- Music by: Malcolm Arnold
- Production company: Ealing Studios
- Distributed by: Metro-Goldwyn-Mayer
- Release date: 20 March 1958
- Running time: 134 minutes
- Country: United Kingdom
- Language: English
- Budget: $1,025,000 or £400,000
- Box office: $2,060,000

Dunkirk is a 1958 British war film directed by Leslie Norman that depicts the Dunkirk evacuation of World War II, and starring John Mills, Richard Attenborough, and Bernard Lee. The film is based on the novels The Big Pick-Up by Elleston Trevor and Dunkirk co-authored by Lt Col Ewan Butler and Major J. S. Bradford.

== Plot ==
In 1940, English journalist Charles Foreman strives to warn his complacent readers of the dangers posed by the build-up of German forces in western Europe. He rails against the Ministry of Information for suppressing the truth. Most of his compatriots, including his neighbour John Holden, have been lulled by the lack of significant fighting during the "Phoney War". Holden owns a garage, with a profitable side-line manufacturing belt buckles for the British Army.

The Battle of France begins, and the Germans advance rapidly, trapping Allied forces along the Channel coast. Lieutenant Lumpkin, Corporal "Tubby" Binns and a handful of men of the British Expeditionary Force return from blowing up a bridge to find their division has withdrawn. The lieutenant speaks to a driver left behind for them, but both are killed in a Luftwaffe aerial attack before Binns can be apprised of the situation, leaving him in charge of four men, Privates Barlow, Bellman, Fraser and Russell, with no idea where their unit has gone. They witness an aerial attack on refugees and reach a Royal Artillery battery camp. Fraser is killed when the battery repulses a German tank force. The officer commanding the battery orders Binns to head north with his men and two stragglers, Privates Harper and Miles, and try to find their unit. Just after they leave, the battery is wiped out by Stuka dive bombers.

Meanwhile, the situation has become so desperate that BEF commander General Gort ignores orders to counterattack and instead positions his units for evacuation from Dunkirk. In England, Vice-Admiral Ramsay directs Operation Dynamo; the Admiralty begins commandeering all suitable civilian boats, including those owned by Foreman and Holden, to sail to Dunkirk to help evacuate troops from the beaches. The boats are marshalled at Sheerness. Foreman insists on taking his motorboat Vanity to Dunkirk himself, despite warnings of the danger. Other boat owners follow his example. After initial reluctance, Holden decides to take his boat Heron too, assisted by his teenage apprentice Frankie.

Binns and his men spend the night in an abandoned farmhouse, but at dawn, a German unit arrives; in the ensuing firefight, Bellman is badly wounded. The men escape, but Binns is forced to leave Bellman behind so he can receive medical attention. Later, after slipping past a German camp under cover of darkness, they stumble upon an RAF lorry, manned by Airmen Froome and Pannet, and go with them to Dunkirk, where Allied troops are being subjected to regular aerial bombing and strafing. Binns and his men manage to board a ship, only for it to be bombed as it departs; they are forced to jump overboard as it sinks. Their prospects of rescue are made worse by the Admiralty's decision to withdraw its destroyers. Ramsay argues against their withdrawal, and the Admiralty reluctantly agrees to send them back.

Foreman and Holden ferry many soldiers to the larger vessels, but Foreman's boat is sunk by a bomber, killing Joe. Foreman is picked up by Holden. With harbour operations no longer possible, thousands of Allied troops gather on the beaches. In the next attack, Barlow is wounded and taken to an aid station. Heron's engine breaks down just off the beach. While Russell, a motor mechanic in civilian life, effects repairs, Foreman and Frankie go ashore to survey the scene. Next day, during church parade, Foreman is killed in an aerial attack. Russell completes his repairs, and Binns' group and six more soldiers board. Holden sets sail for home. At sea, the engine breaks down again and the boat drifts towards the German-held port of Calais. Fortunately, they are spotted by a destroyer and taken back to England.

== Cast ==
- John Mills as Cpl "Tubby" Binns
- Richard Attenborough as John Holden
- Bernard Lee as Charles Foreman
- Robert Urquhart as Pte Mike Russell
- Ray Jackson as Pte Barlow
- Ronald Hines as Pte Miles
- Sean Barrett as Frankie, Holden's apprentice
- Roland Curram as Pte Harper
- Meredith Edwards as Pte Dave Bellman
- Michael Bates as Airman Froome
- Rodney Diak as Airman Pannet
- Michael Shillo as Jouvet, a French reporter
- Eddie Byrne as commander (Tough's Yard)
- Maxine Audley as Diana Foreman, Charles's wife
- Lionel Jeffries as colonel (senior medical officer)
- Victor Maddern as merchant navy seaman in pub (Maddern was a wartime merchant navy seaman.)
- Anthony Nicholls as military spokesman
- Bud Flanagan and Chesney Allen as themselves (Flanagan and Allen)
- Kenneth Cope as Lt Lumpkin
- Denys Graham as Pte Fraser
- Barry Foster as the despatch rider who directs Tubby to the artillery battery
- Warwick Ashton as battery sergeant major
- Peter Halliday as battery major
- John Welsh as staff colonel
- Lloyd Lamble as staff colonel
- Cyril Raymond as General Viscount Gort, VC
- Nicholas Hannen as Vice-Admiral Ramsay at Dover
- Patricia Plunkett as Grace Holden, John's wife
- Michael Gwynn as commander at Sheerness
- Fred Griffiths as Old Sweat
- Dan Cressy as Joe
- Christopher Rhodes as sergeant on the beaches
- Harry Landis as Lieutenant Levy, a military doctor working on the beach
- John Horsley as padre
- Patrick Allen as sergeant on parade ground
- Bernard Cribbins as thirsty sailor (uncredited)
- William Squire as captain of minesweeper (uncredited)
- Bud Tingwell as sergeant in cookhouse (uncredited)

== Production ==
Filming started 29 April 1957. Michael Balcon called it "the most important film in Ealing's history."

Owners of small boats were tracked down for production and the cast featured genuine army officers. Approximately twenty minutes was cut for the U.S. release. Popular wartime British music hall performers Bud Flanagan and Chesney Allen portray themselves, performing "We’re Going to Hang Out the Washing on the Siegfried Line." The film was shot on location in France and at M-G-M's British Studios. Stock footage is used from The Cruel Sea (1953) to show a destroyer being sunk at the mole. Beach sequences were shot at Camber Sands near Rye, East Sussex, and Dunkirk town centre was recreated using part of Rye Harbour. A canal-type bridge was temporarily constructed over the upper harbour, leading on to the quayside. It was over this bridge that the refugees and troops poured into the "town centre". Several scenes take place at this location, particularly a tracking shot following two British Army officers as they discuss the situation. In the background, the viewer can make out Rye Church and some old warehouses, still extant, albeit in much restored condition. One of the warehouses was used as the interior for the "Barn Scene". Tibbs Farmhouse, Udimore, was used for the scene of the soldiers taking refuge in a French farmhouse. The scene where the bridge was blown during the early part of the film was on the River Medway at Teston Bridge, Teston, in Kent.

Director Leslie Norman later recalled:

Dunkirk was bloody difficult to make from a logistics point of view. Yet it was made for £400,000 and came in under budget... I was the council school boy who became a major in the war, and that had a lot to do with the way I felt about Dunkirk. I didn't think that Dunkirk was a defeat; I always thought it was a very gallant effort but not a victory.

The musical score is by Malcolm Arnold, which may account for the fact that many of its segments sound very much like his Academy Award-winning theme from The Bridge on the River Kwai, made the previous year (1957), or Heroes of Telemark (1965).

== Reception ==
The world premiere was at the Empire, Leicester Square, in London on 20 March 1958.

=== Box office ===
The film was the third most popular production at the British box office in 1958, after Bridge on the River Kwai and The Vikings. (Other accounts say it was the second, making $1,750,000.)

According to MGM records it earned only $310,000 in the US and Canada but $1,750,000 elsewhere; after distribution costs were deducted MGM earned a profit of $371,000. Michael Balcon admitted the film did not do well in the US but it "did wonderfully well in other parts of the world."

=== Reviews ===
Bosley Crowther, in his New York Times review, praised the performances of the leads and supporting cast.

Later reviews give positive to mixed feelings on the film. A review for "The Movie Scene" gave the film three out of five stars, praising the performances of the leads, and the effects. Nerdly.co.uk notes the film has "a level of authenticity that is surprisingly truthful, even about the mishandling of events by the British". The critic Derek Winnert noted that the film was a "long, ambitious, engrossing, intelligent and informative film, and not nearly as celebrated as it should be."

A review for The Spinning Image noted that "while it was a hit in its day and went onto be a staple of television broadcasts for many years, you can't but mention it was overshadowed by Christopher Nolan's Dunkirk in 2017 which applied twenty-first century techniques to a nineteen-forties plot and was one of the biggest movies of the twenty-tens, but the '58 version had a power of its own, and should not be dismissed." Another reviewer said that the film "pales beside Nolan’s film, but in many respects, it more accurately reflects the British attitude in the immediate post-World War II period and is a good complement to it."

== See also ==
- List of British films of 1958
- List of World War II films
- Dunkirk (2017 film)
