= Thurnham Castle =

Castle in Kent, United Kingdom

- Kent, England
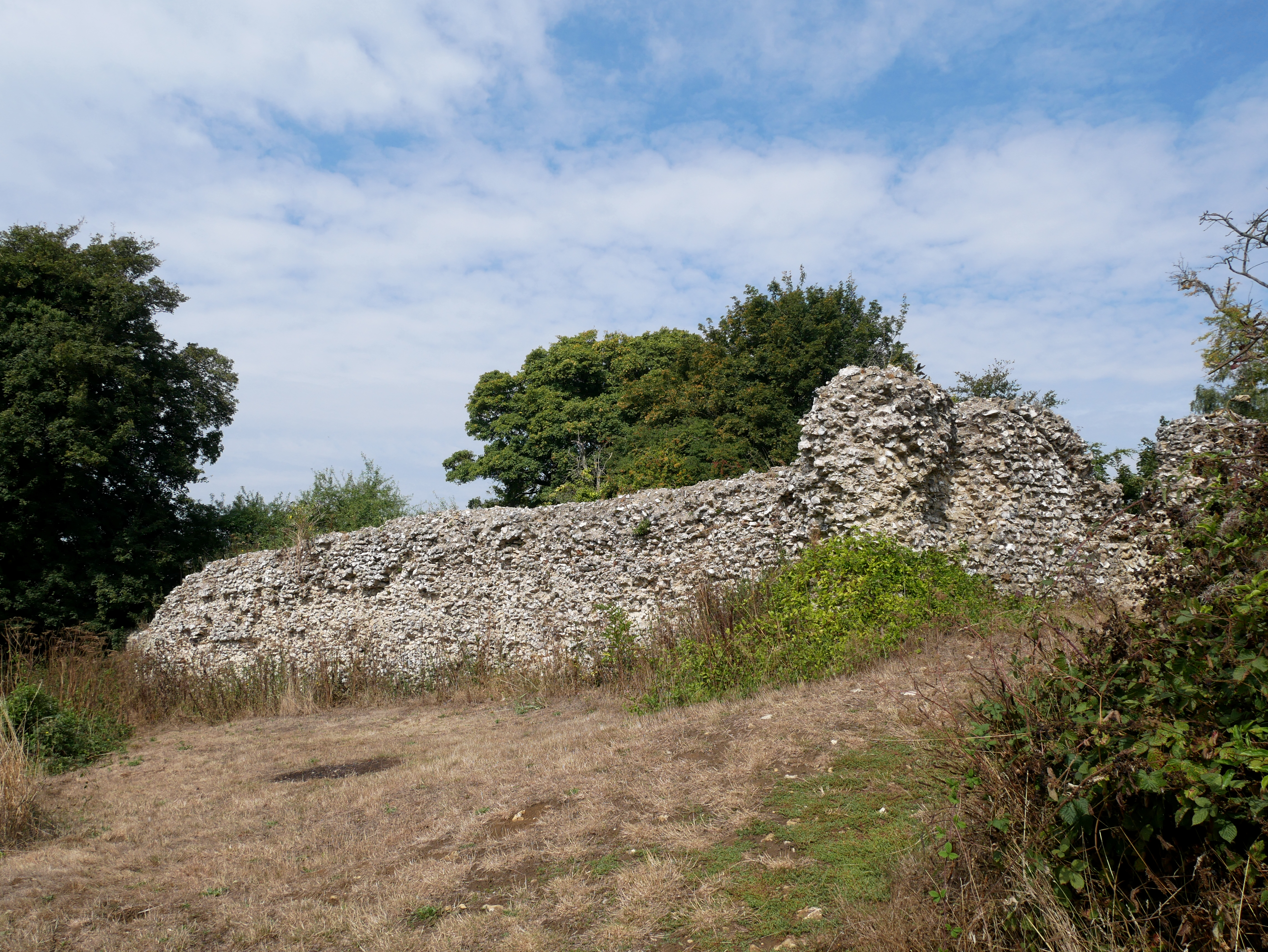
- The surviving wall at Thurnham Castle

Site information
- Type: Motte and bailey
- Owner: Kent County Council
- Open to the public: Yes
- Condition: Ruin

Location
- Shown within Kent
- Coordinates: 51.29422°N 0.59178°E
- Grid reference: TQ 808 582

Site history
- Materials: Flint

Thurnham Castle or Godard's Castle is situated to the north of the village of Thurnham which is 3 miles north-east of Maidstone, Kent (grid reference TQ 808 582).

It is a 12th-century flint-built castle constructed by Robert of Thurnham in the reign of Henry II on a hill on the edge of the North Downs. One side of the bailey wall still stands 10 foot high and originally it enclosed an area of about a quarter of an acre.

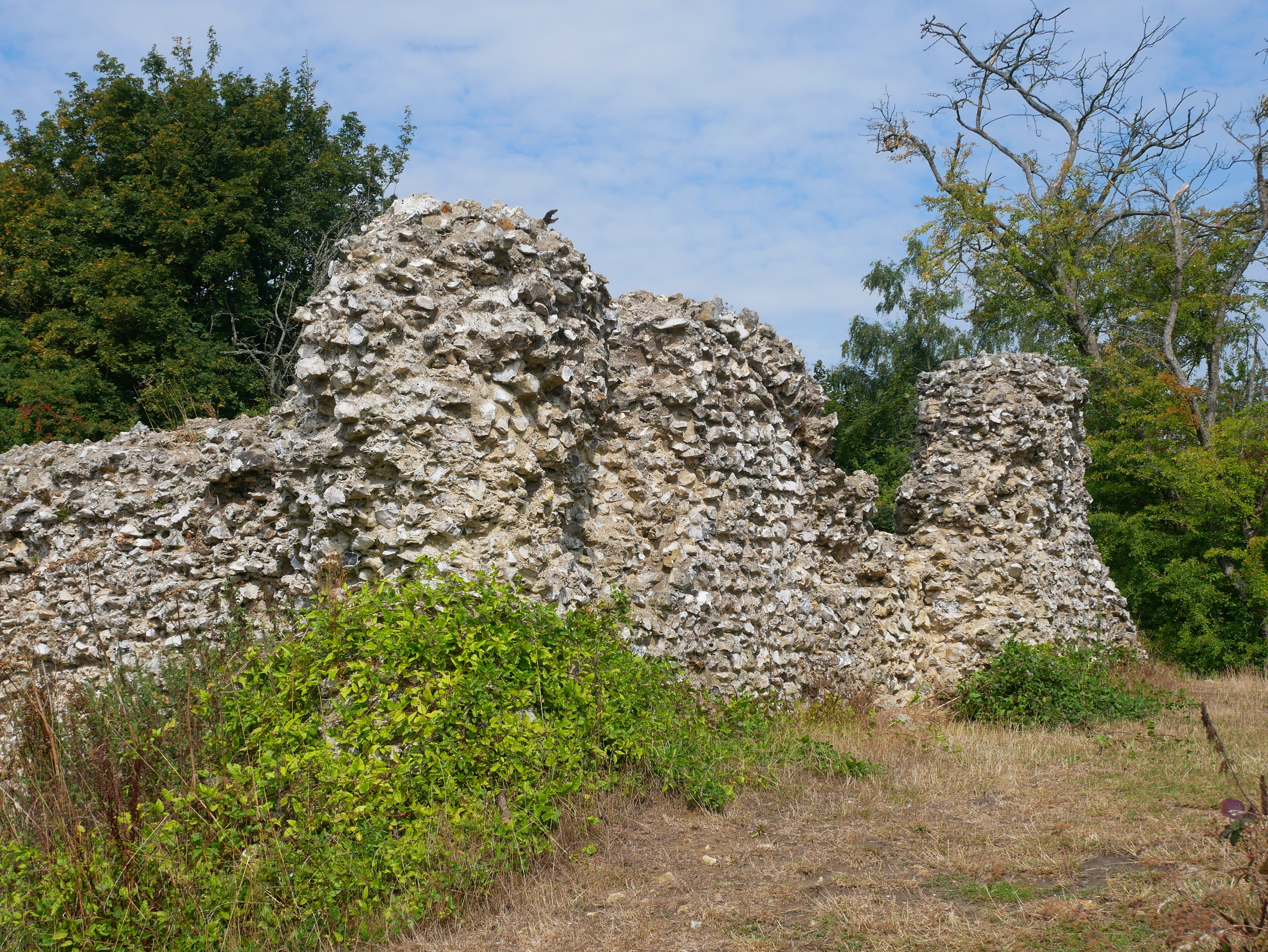
The gatehouse wall of Thurnham Castle

In the 12th century, the site belonged to the de Say family and then the Thurnhams.

The site has been acquired by Kent County Council and included in the White Horse Wood and Country Park Project. Much of the site has been cleared of undergrowth and public access has been provided.

== See also ==
- List of scheduled monuments in Maidstone
