= Archbishop's Palace, Maidstone =

Building in Maidstone, Kent, England

Archbishop's Palace
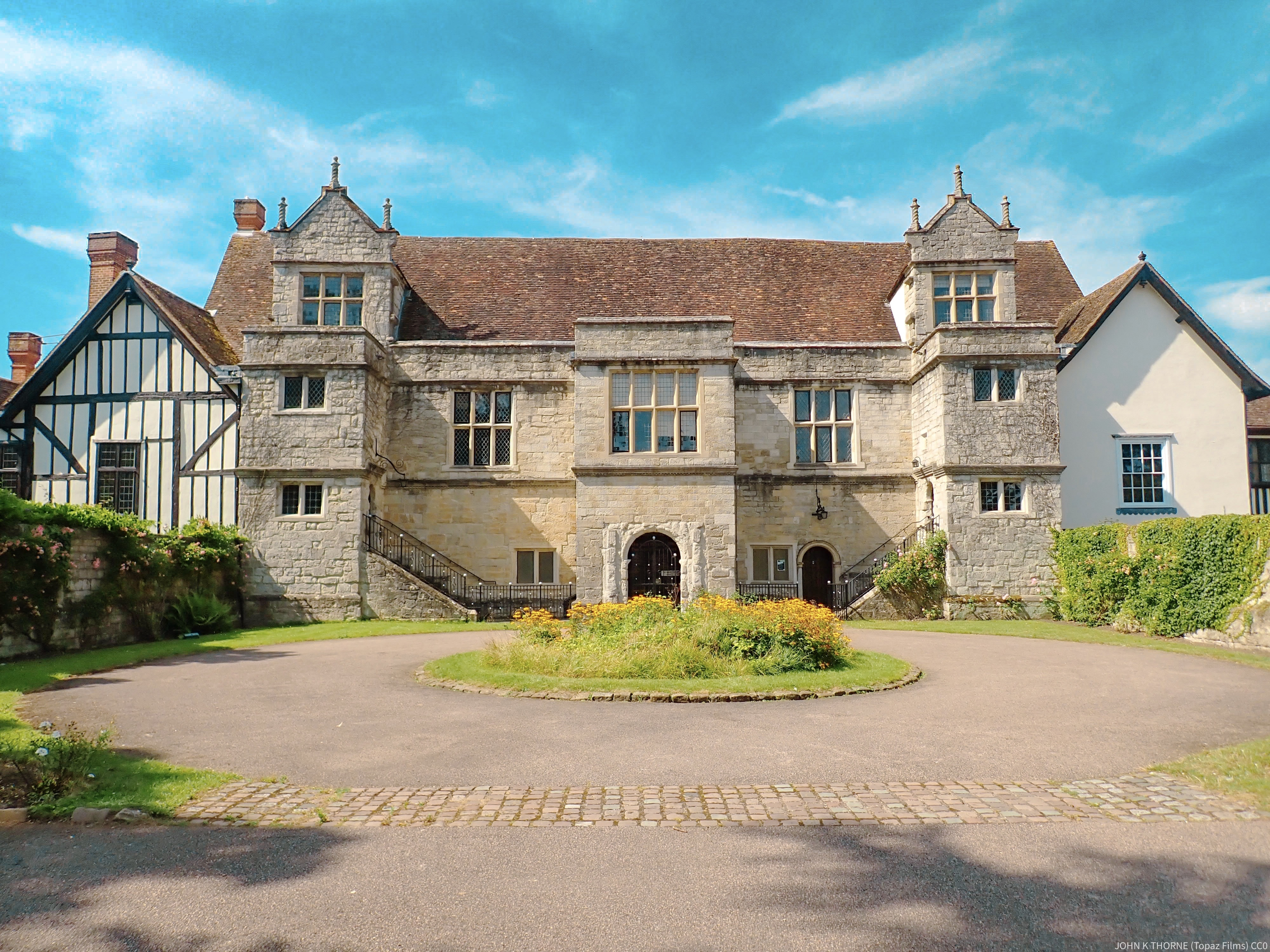
- The entrance frontage of the Archbishop's Palace

- Location within Kent

General information
- Location: Maidstone, England
- Coordinates: 51°16′16″N 0°31′14″E
- Completed: 14th century, 16th century

The Archbishop's Palace is a Grade I listed historic 14th-century and 16th-century building on the east bank of the River Medway in Maidstone, Kent. Originally a home from home for travelling archbishops from Canterbury, the building has been most recently used as a venue for wedding services. The former tithe barn for the palace (today severed from the palace by the A229), now serves as the Tyrwhitt-Drake Museum of Carriages.

== History ==
The Manor of Maidstone was probably given to the Archbishops of Canterbury as a royal gift during the 7th or 8th centuries. A house on the site of the palace was given to Archbishop Langton by Rector William de Cornhill in 1207 to be used as a resting-place for archbishops travelling between London and Canterbury and is linked to palaces at Charing, Otford and Croydon. Cornhill's house was demolished by Archbishop Ufford.

The first work on the current building was ordered by Archbishop Ufford in 1348 and was continued by Archbishop Islip between 1349 and 1366, partly with materials from a palace at Wrotham. At the end of the 14th century Archbishop Courtenay expanded the establishment in Maidstone when he founded the neighbouring College and Church of All Saints. The palace was enlarged and improved by Archbishop Morton in 1486, but it and the College were given to Henry VIII by Archbishop Cranmer in exchange for property elsewhere.

Henry VIII granted the palace to Sir Thomas Wyatt, but the estate was forfeited to the Crown in 1554 following the rebellion led by his son, Thomas Wyatt the younger, against Mary I. It was later given by Elizabeth I to Sir John Astley, son of John Astley, Master of the Jewel Office.

Astley extended the palace, building much of the existing structure. On his death there in 1639, he bequeathed the manor to Jacob Astley, 1st Baron Astley of Reading. Lord Astley died at the palace in 1652 and it passed to his son and grandson, the second and third barons. On the death of the third baron in 1688, the barony became extinct and the palace passed to his cousin Sir Jacob Astley. In 1720, Sir Jacob sold the palace to Robert Marsham, 1st Baron Romney who lived at nearby Mote House.

The palace was subsequently sold by the Marsham family. At the beginning of the 20th century it was used as a Territorial Army medical school.

=== Present day ===
The palace has been managed by Kent County Council and primarily used as a register office. It is only open to the public on regular "Heritage Days". There have been plans to use the building as a wine bar or hotel. As of October 2023, new tenants are being sought for the building.

The Kent Garden's Trust tends the Apothecary's Garden which is open to the public between May and August on Wednesday afternoons only.

== Buildings ==
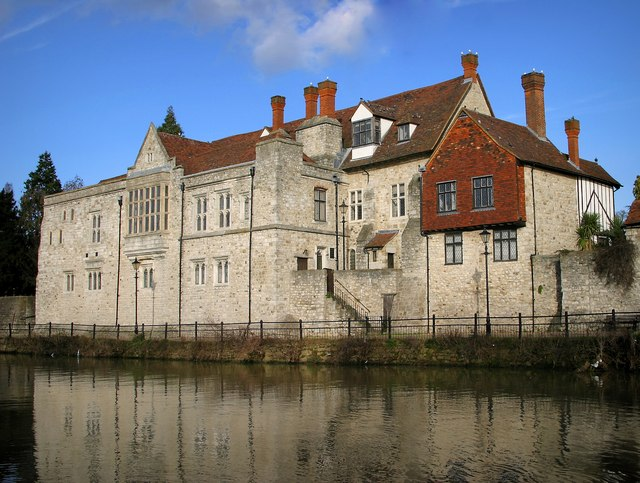
The Archbishop's Palace from the River Medway

The E-shaped palace building is located on the east bank of the River Medway close to its meeting with the River Len. The two-storey central section is constructed of ashlar stonework with a main entrance through a central projecting porch in the north-east façade. Timber framed wings are at each side. The roof is clay tiled and two projecting stone-built dormer windows at attic level on the entrance façade are capped with finials. The south-west façade has windows in a variety of sizes, many stone-framed, and includes a large corbelled and three-tiered and oriel window.

Close to the palace on the south side is the dungeon, a 14th-century stone building with small windows and an early Norman undercroft. To the north-east of the palace, adjacent to Mill Street and the River Len is the 13th and 14th century gatehouse, a two-storey building constructed of roughly coursed rubble and timber framing on the east end. The roof is tiled and a garderobe projects on the north side.

The palace is a Grade I listed building, the dungeon is listed Grade II*, and the gatehouse is listed Grade II and a scheduled monument. The buildings are surrounded by walls which are Grade II listed. The Dungeon is on the Historic England Heritage at Risk Register.

== See also ==
- Grade I listed buildings in Maidstone
- List of scheduled monuments in Maidstone
