= White Horse Wood =

Country park in Kent, England

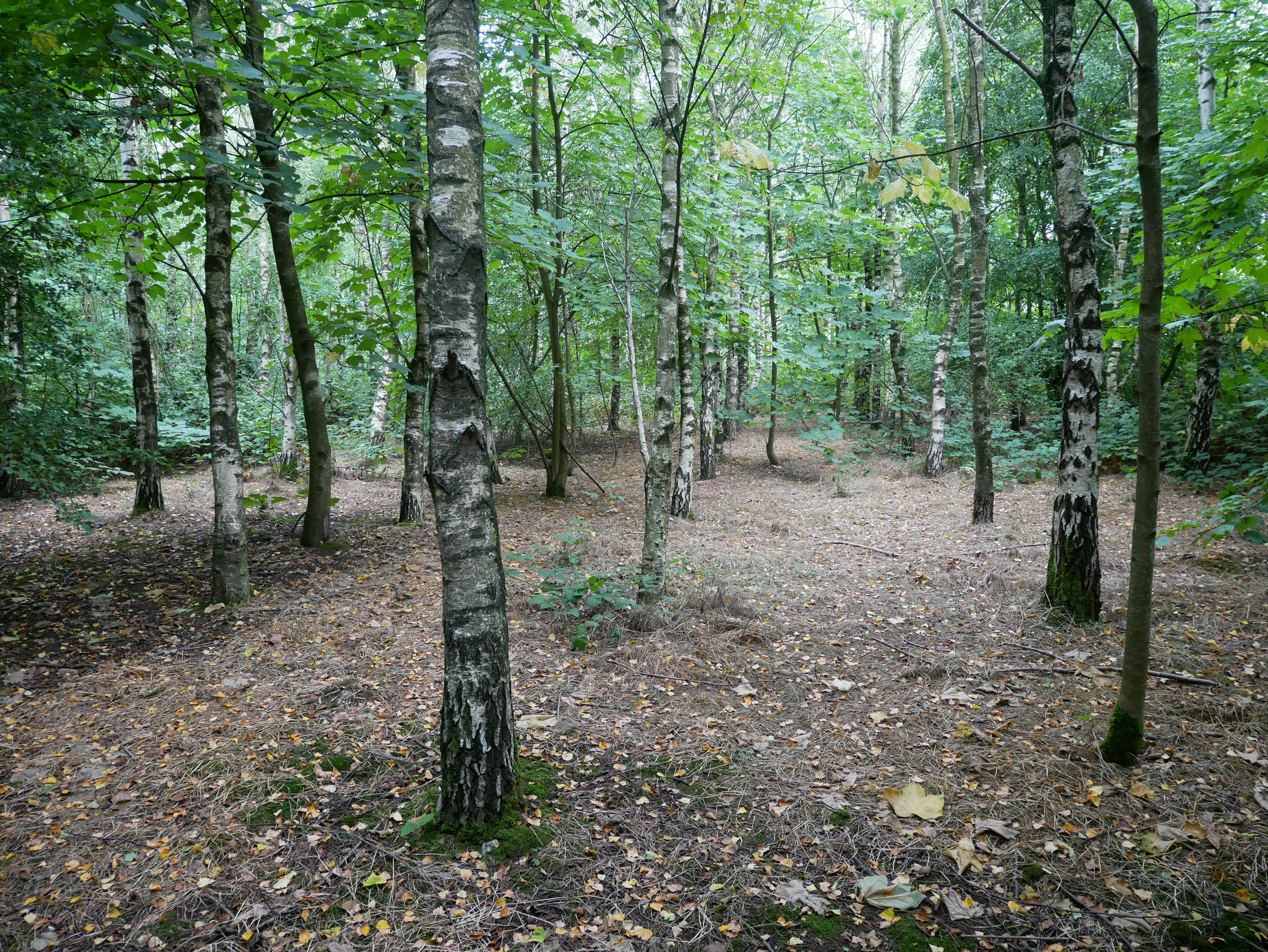
- Woodland at the White Horse Wood Country Park

- Location within Kent
- OS grid: TQ808586
- Coordinates: 51°17′49″N 0°35′33″E
- Area: 26 hectares (260,000 m^{2})
- Created: 2000
- Operator: Kent County Council,
- Open: Open 7 days a week, dawn until dusk
- Status: complete
- Website: White Horse Wood Country Park

White Horse Wood is a recently created English country park near Thurnham to the north of Maidstone, Kent. Located within the Kent Downs Area of Outstanding Natural Beauty, the park is a Site of Nature Conservation Interest.

== Overview ==
White Horse Wood is Kent's newest country park, created as a Millennium project to replace the ancient woodland on top of the North Downs. It is managed by Kent County Council. The site hosts the medieval ruins of Thurnham Castle and also traces of an Iron Age settlement. The 26-hectare site was purchased by Kent County Council specifically to create the park.

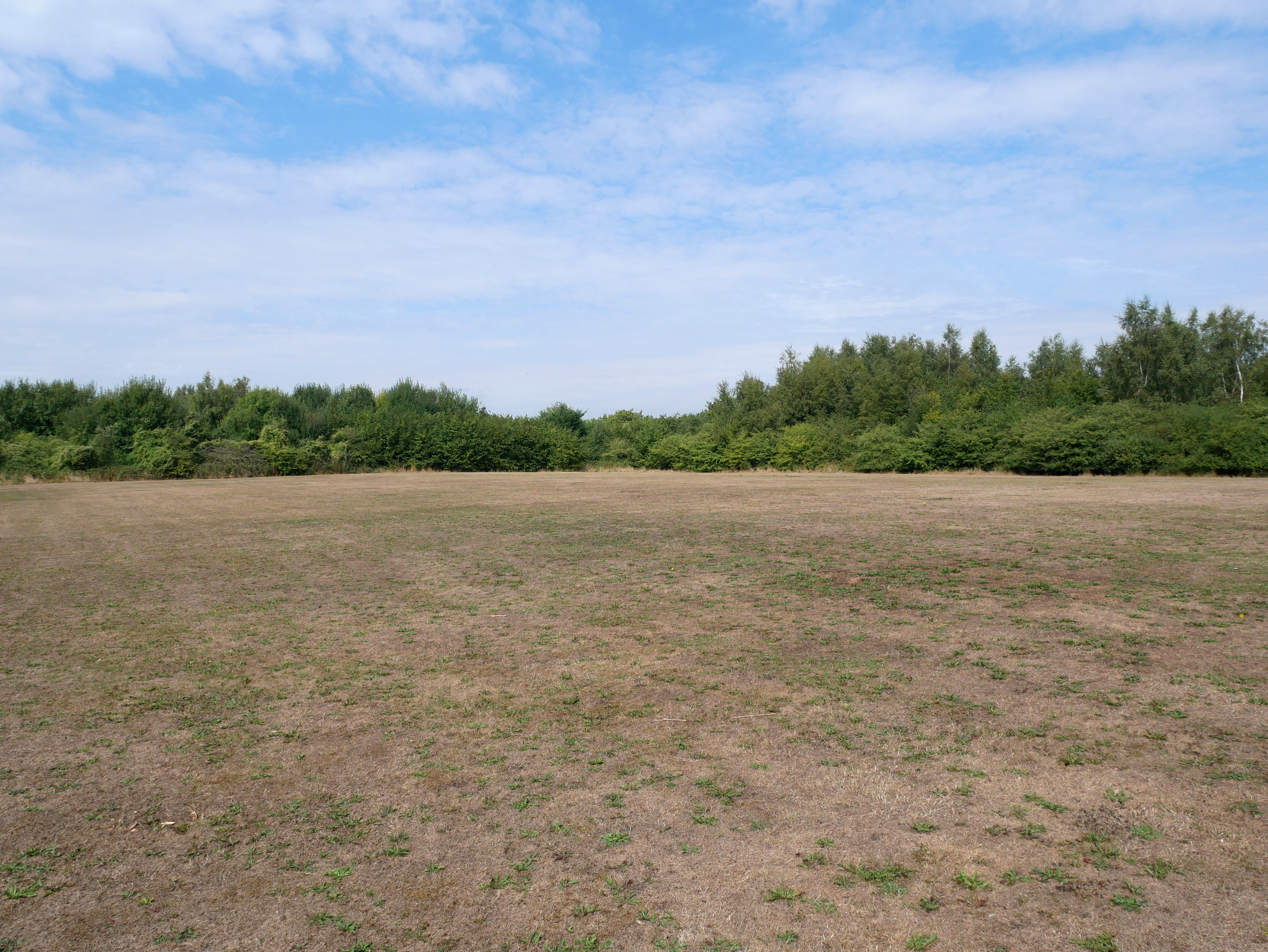
The open area marking the former Iron Age enclosure in White Horse Wood

Over 20,000 trees have been planted at the site including oak, ash, silver birch, wild cherry and crab apple. Five hectares of land has been seeded to create an area of open grassland. The Kent County Agricultural Society has a plot in the wood where it has planted 1,200 specifically Kent-grown trees, including oak, ash, hornbeam and crab apple.

In 2009, EDF Energy replaced an overhead electricity cable running through the park with underground cabling to help restore the natural look of the area.

The North Downs Way passes through the southern border of the park, between Detling and Broad Street.
