= Garrard Tyrwhitt-Drake =

Sir (Hugh) Garrard Tyrwhitt-Drake
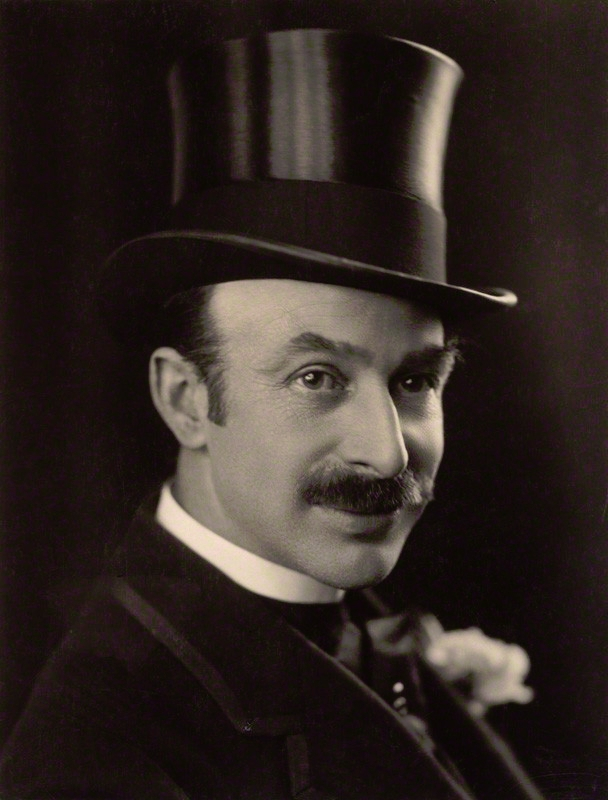
- circa 1910–1920 by Henry Walter Barnett

Mayor of Maidstone
- In office 1915–16, 1923–25, 1928–29, 1930–31, 1934–35, 1939–44, 1949–50

High Sheriff of Kent
- In office 1956–57

Personal details
- Born: 22 May 1881
- Died: 24 October 1964 (aged 83) Maidstone
- Occupation: Businessman, zoo owner, author

Sir (Hugh) Garrard Tyrwhitt-Drake DL JP (22 May 1881 – 24 October 1964) was a businessman, zoo owner and author. Between 1915 and 1950, he was twelve times the Mayor of Maidstone, Kent and was High Sheriff of Kent in 1956–57.

== Life ==
Tyrwhitt-Drake was born in Maidstone on 22 May 1881, the only child of Hugh William Tyrwhitt-Drake, a brewery manager, and his wife Anne (née) Hopper. (Note: The Tyrwhitt-Drake family originated in Amersham, Buckinghamshire, where the family home was Shardeloes.) He was educated at Charterhouse School. In 1925, he married Edna Mary Vine.

Tyrwhitt-Drake was a director of several companies, including the Medway Lower Navigation Company, and was heavily involved in local politics, serving on the council of the Borough of Maidstone for 48 years and as its mayor twelve times. From 1930 he was an honorary Freeman of the borough and in 1936 was knighted for political and public services to the County of Kent. He was appointed a Deputy Lieutenant of Kent in 1945, and High Sheriff of Kent for 1956–57.

He lived at Cobtree Manor, Sandling, where he used part of his estate to house his private zoo – the largest in Great Britain – in which he kept lions, tigers, bears and elephants. (Note: The zoo was open to the public from 1934 until its closure in 1959.) Tyrwhitt-Drake wrote two books: Beasts and Circuses; My Life with Animals (1939) and The English Circus and Fairground (1946). As mayor, he was a major benefactor to the town of Maidstone, establishing the carriage museum that bears his name in 1946 and donating the buildings of the College of All Saints in 1950. In 1951, he established the Cobtree Charity Trust to ensure that the grounds of Cobtree Manor would be used for the benefit of the inhabitants of Maidstone and the surrounding area. Following his death in 1964, parts of the estate are now open to the public as Cobtree Manor Park, Cobtree Manor Golf Course and Kent Life open-air museum.

Tyrwhitt-Drake's portrait as Mayor of Maidstone is contained in the collection of Maidstone Museum & Art Gallery.
