= Listed buildings in Teston =

Civil Parish in Kent, England

Teston is a village and civil parish in the Borough of Maidstone of Kent, England It contains one grade I, two grade II* and 20 grade II listed buildings that are recorded in the National Heritage List for England.

This list is based on the information retrieved online from Historic England.

== Key ==
Grade	Criteria
I	Buildings that are of exceptional interest
II*	Particularly important buildings of more than special interest
II	Buildings that are of special interest

== Listing ==
Name	Grade	Location	Type	Completed (Note: The date given is the date used by Historic England as significant for the initial building or that of an important part in the structure's description.)	Date designated	Grid ref. (Note: The grid reference is based on the British national grid reference system, sometimes known as OSGB36, used by the Ordnance Survey.) Geo-coordinates	Notes	Entry number (Note: The "List Entry Number" is a unique number assigned to each listed building and scheduled monument by Historic England.)	Image	Wikidata
Barham Court	II*		English country house		25 July 1952	TQ7068453661; 51°15′24″N 0°26′41″E		1251014	Barham Court More images	Q15196741
Former Stables to East of Barham Court	II				26 February 1987	TQ7075753703; 51°15′25″N 0°26′45″E		1251032	Upload Photo	Q26543030
Teston Bridge	I		road bridge		26 February 1987	TQ7088153269; 51°15′11″N 0°26′50″E		1262983	Teston Bridge More images	Q7705927
1 and 2, Church Street	II	1 and 2, Church Street			23 May 1967	TQ7042253501; 51°15′19″N 0°26′27″E		1251055	Upload Photo	Q26543053
3 4 and 5, Church Street	II	3 4 and 5, Church Street			23 May 1967	TQ7043453505; 51°15′19″N 0°26′28″E		1251068	Upload Photo	Q26543065
Church of St Peter and St Paul	II*	Church Street	church building		23 May 1967	TQ7055153506; 51°15′19″N 0°26′34″E		1251097	Church of St Peter and St Paul More images	Q17545290
Monument to Henry Lomas About 27 Metres East of Church of St Peter and St Paul	II	Church Street			26 February 1987	TQ7058653519; 51°15′19″N 0°26′36″E		1251118	Upload Photo	Q26543114
Monument to Susanna Feild About 3 Metres East of Chancel of Church of St Peter and St Paul	II	Church Street			26 February 1987	TQ7056453512; 51°15′19″N 0°26′34″E		1262916	Upload Photo	Q26553754
The Cottage and the Cottage West	II	Church Street			23 May 1967	TQ7050153529; 51°15′20″N 0°26′31″E		1251090	Upload Photo	Q26543087
The Post Office Stores and House Attached	II	Church Street			23 May 1967	TQ7038253491; 51°15′18″N 0°26′25″E		1251050	Upload Photo	Q26543048
The White House	II	Church Street			26 February 1987	TQ7033953468; 51°15′18″N 0°26′23″E		1262959	Upload Photo	Q26553793
1-4 Livesey Cottages	II	1-4, Livesey Cottages, Livesey Street, ME18 5AY			26 February 1987	TQ7022554276; 51°15′44″N 0°26′18″E		1251131	Upload Photo	Q26543125
Livesey Cottage	II	Livesey Street, ME18 5AY			26 February 1987	TQ7021354308; 51°15′45″N 0°26′18″E		1262927	Upload Photo	Q26553765
Woodlands Cottage and Cottage Adjoining to Left	II	Livesey Street			26 February 1987	TQ6978754710; 51°15′59″N 0°25′56″E		1251125	Upload Photo	Q26543119
Barham Cottage	II	Malling Road			26 February 1987	TQ7032353706; 51°15′25″N 0°26′22″E		1251171	Upload Photo	Q26543157
Becketts Croft	II	Malling Road			26 February 1987	TQ7035653532; 51°15′20″N 0°26′24″E		1251167	Upload Photo	Q26543153
Broad Halfpenny and the Cabin	II	Malling Road			26 February 1987	TQ7033153480; 51°15′18″N 0°26′22″E		1262906	Upload Photo	Q26553746
Old Cyder House Cottages	II	1, 2 and 3, North Pole Road			5 February 1979	TQ7036454738; 51°15′59″N 0°26′26″E		1251146	Upload Photo	Q26543138
1 and 2, the Street	II	1 and 2, The Street			26 February 1987	TQ7033853504; 51°15′19″N 0°26′23″E		1251176	Upload Photo	Q26543162
Court Lodge Farmhouse	II	The Street			26 February 1987	TQ7055353460; 51°15′17″N 0°26′34″E		1262903	Upload Photo	Q26553743
K6 Telephone Kiosk Outside Teston Working Mens Club	II	The Street			8 February 1988	TQ7037353467; 51°15′18″N 0°26′24″E		1262893	Upload Photo	Q26553736
Lodge and Railings to North East Side of South East Drive to Barham Court	II	Tonbridge Road			26 February 1987	TQ7109353660; 51°15′23″N 0°27′02″E		1262881	Upload Photo	Q26553724
Lodge and Railings to South West Side of South East Drive to Barham Court	II	Tonbridge Road			26 February 1987	TQ7108153650; 51°15′23″N 0°27′01″E		1251183	Upload Photo	Q26543168

== See also ==
- Grade I listed buildings in Kent
- Grade II* listed buildings in Kent

== Sources ==
- Newman, John (2012) [1969], Kent: West and the Weald, The Buildings of England, New Haven and London: Yale University Press, ISBN 978-0-300-18509-6
