= College of All Saints, Maidstone =

Ecclesiastical college in Kent, England

College of All Saints
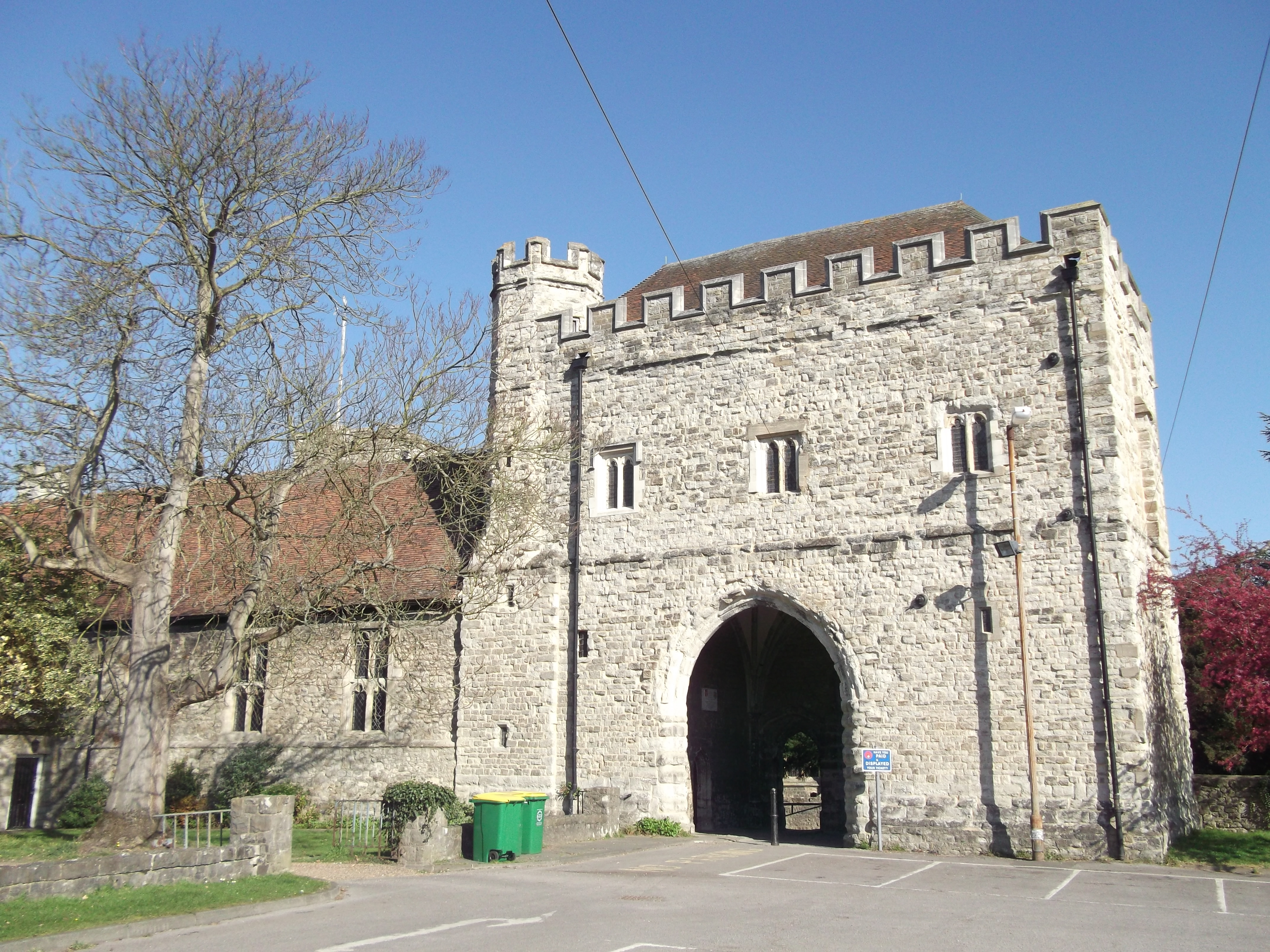
- The College Gateway

- Location within Kent

General information
- Location: Maidstone, England
- Coordinates: 51.2701°N 0.5217°E
- Completed: 14th century

The College of All Saints was an ecclesiastical college in Maidstone, Kent, England, founded in 1395 by Archbishop Courtenay. It was part of the establishment of the nearby Archbishop's Palace, but was closed in 1546. The College church was the neighbouring Church of All Saints. Following its closure, the College estate was sold. The buildings and land passed through the ownership of three aristocratic families, being farmed until the late 19th century. A number of the College's buildings survive and all are listed buildings. Additionally, the whole site of the College is protected as a scheduled monument.

== History ==
The College was founded by Archbishop of Canterbury William Courtenay in 1395. Courtenay died in 1396 and the College and church were completed by his successor, Thomas Arundel. Richard II endowed the College with land and income from the Hospital of St Peter and St Paul in Maidstone and from the parishes of Linton, Farleigh, Sutton and Crundale. The College was also granted the advowsons for the parishes. To cover the cost of building the College, Courtenay obtained a bull to levy a charge of fourpence in the pound on all ecclesiastical revenue raised in his archbishopric. (Note: In Courtenay's time there were 240 pence in the pound. The charge was therefore equal to 1.7% of income.) For most of its existence, the college had an establishment of a master and six chaplains.

Masters of the College between its founding and its dissolution were:

- John Wootton (1395–1417)
- John Holond (1418–19)
- Roger Heron (1419–41)
- John Darell (1441–44)
- Peter Stackley (1450–58)
- Thomas Boleyn (1458–70)
- John Freestone (1470)
- John Lee (1470–94)
- John Comberton (1494–1506)
- William Grocyn (1506–19)
- Thomas Penyton (1519–?)
- John Leffe (before 1535–46)

When the College was closed in 1546 following the passing of the Chantries Act, its annual income was valued at £208 6s 2d (equivalent to £153,560 in 2025). The church and the College were separated; the church became the parish church for the whole of Maidstone and the College and its lands were sold. Sixteen members of the College's establishment were granted pensions totalling £100 17s. (Note: The Master's pension of £48 16s 8d was almost half of the total sum.) In 1549, the College estate was granted to George Brooke, Baron Cobham for the sum of £1081 18s 1d (equivalent to £634,980 in 2025). Plate and other valuables belonging to the College were sold for £200 (equivalent to £117,380 in 2025).

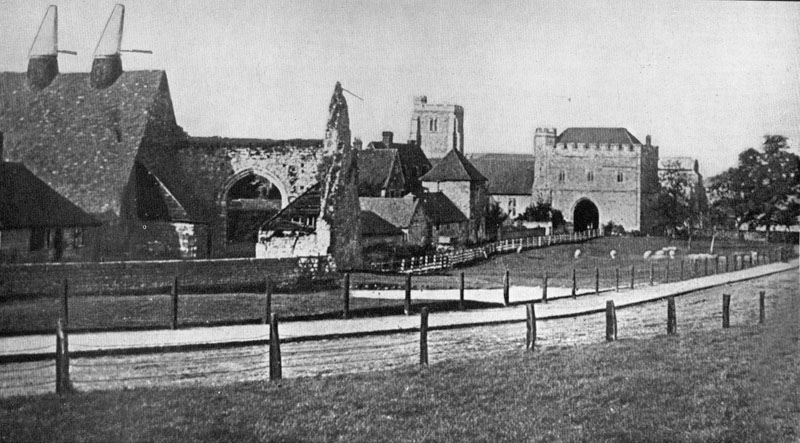
College farm, 1866. Showing most of the buildings remaining today. The oast house on the left has been demolished.

Much of the Cobham family's estate was forfeited to the Crown in 1603 when his grandson, Henry Brooke, the 11th Baron Cobham, was charged with high treason for his part in the Main Plot against James I. The College was granted for life to the 11th Baron's wife after which it reverted to Robert Cecil, 1st Earl of Salisbury, husband of Baron Cobham's sister. The College remained in the ownership of the Cecil family until 1697 when it was sold to Sir Robert Marsham of Mote House. The College estate was subsequently owned by Marsham's heirs, the Earls of Romney.

The College buildings were used as a farm into the 19th century, until the expansion of Maidstone led to their demolition as the neighbouring area was developed. Part of the site was developed in the late 19th century for the Cutbush Almshouses, a collection of grade II listed buildings. The buildings are currently owned by Maidstone Borough Council having been donated to the borough by Sir Garrard Tyrwhitt-Drake, mayor of the borough in 1949–50. A plaque commemorating the presentation is fixed inside the archway of the Gatehouse.

Part of the buildings were used by Kent Music School (later Kent Music) until 2000 when the school relocated to Astley House on Hastings Road.

== Buildings ==
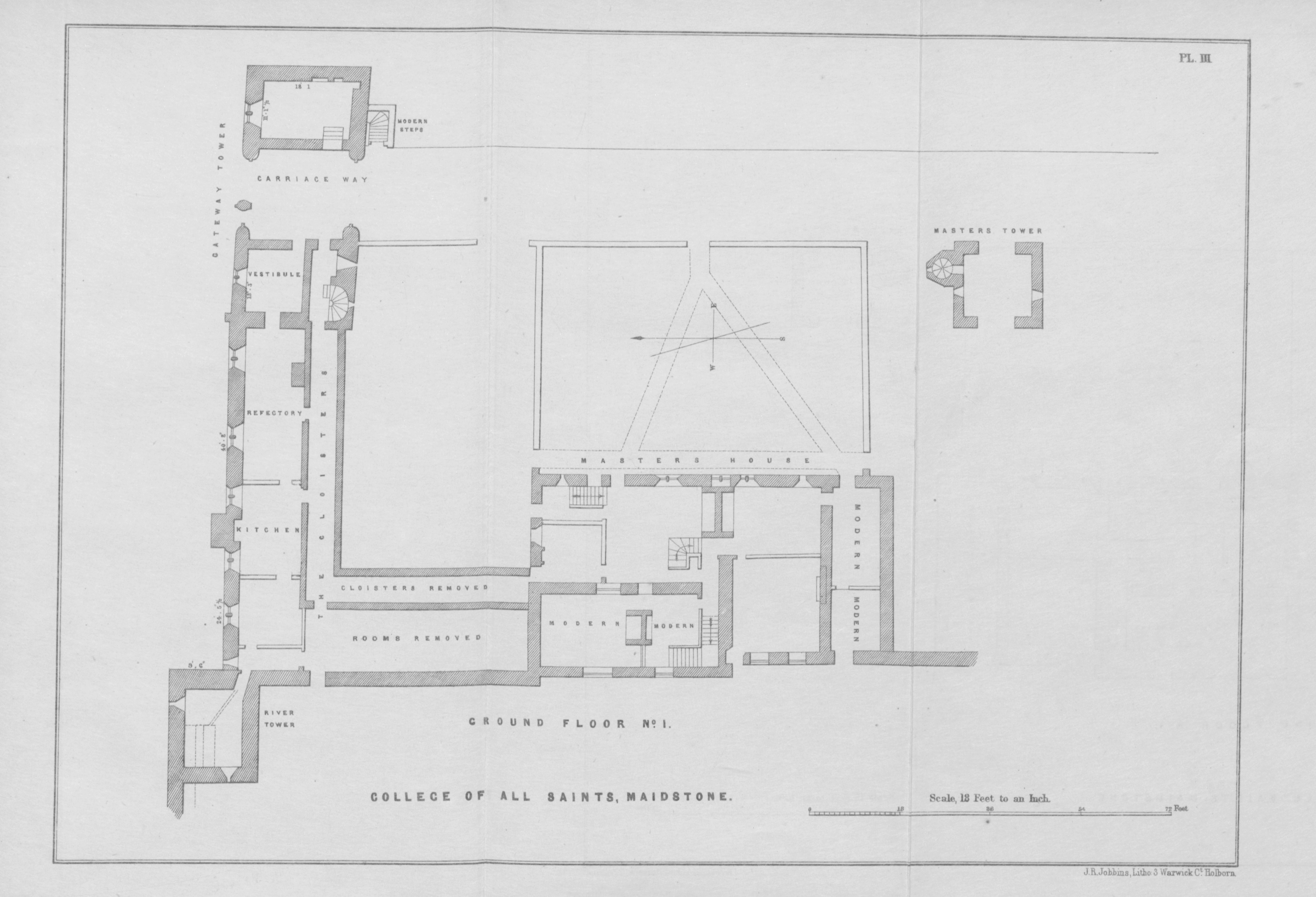
Plan of the College buildings in 1845

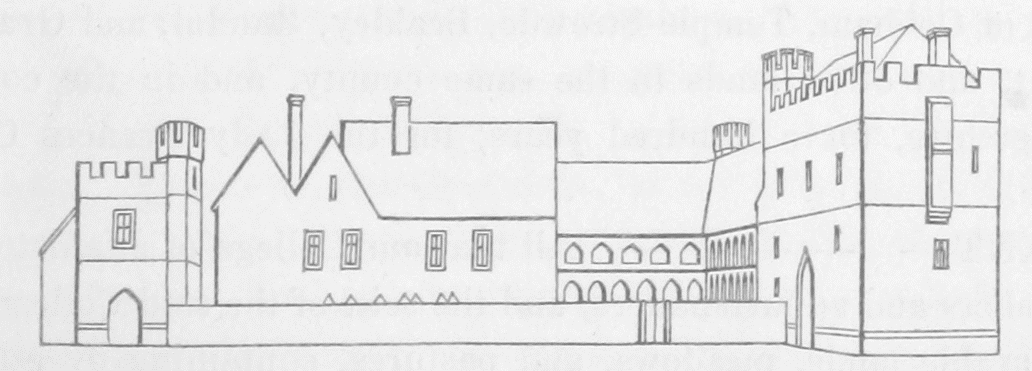
Speculative reconstruction of the original appearance

The College, like the Church of All Saints, is constructed of Kentish rag-stone in the Perpendicular style. The main building, a two-storey structure with attic, was mostly built in the 14th century and served originally as the Master's house. Some later 18th century alterations have been made and later windows added. The building contains a collar beam roof and a 16th-century staircase, moulded ceiling and aumbry cupboard. Poste records in his 1847 history of the College that some of the rooms retained traces of decorative wall painting.

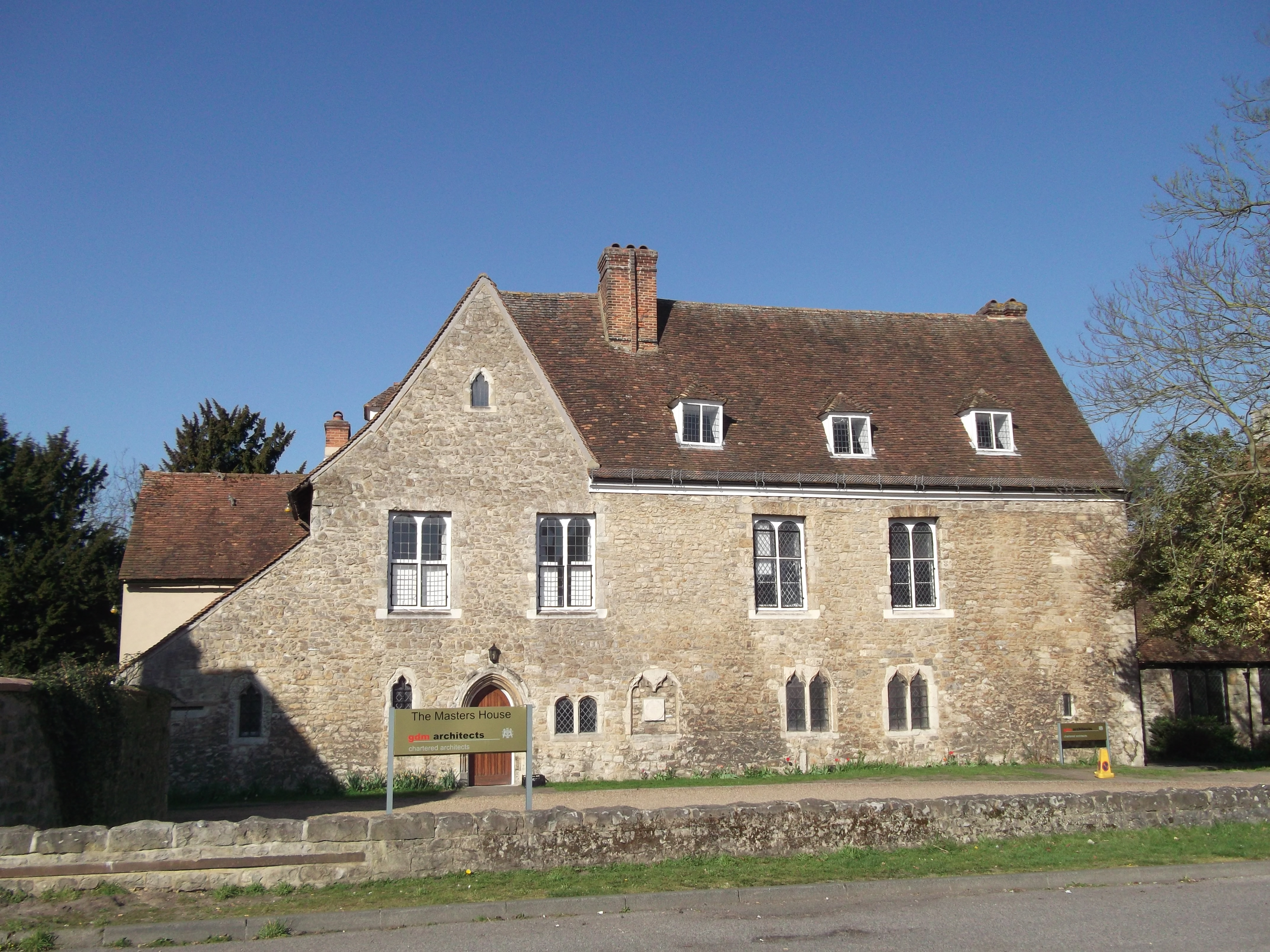
The Master's House

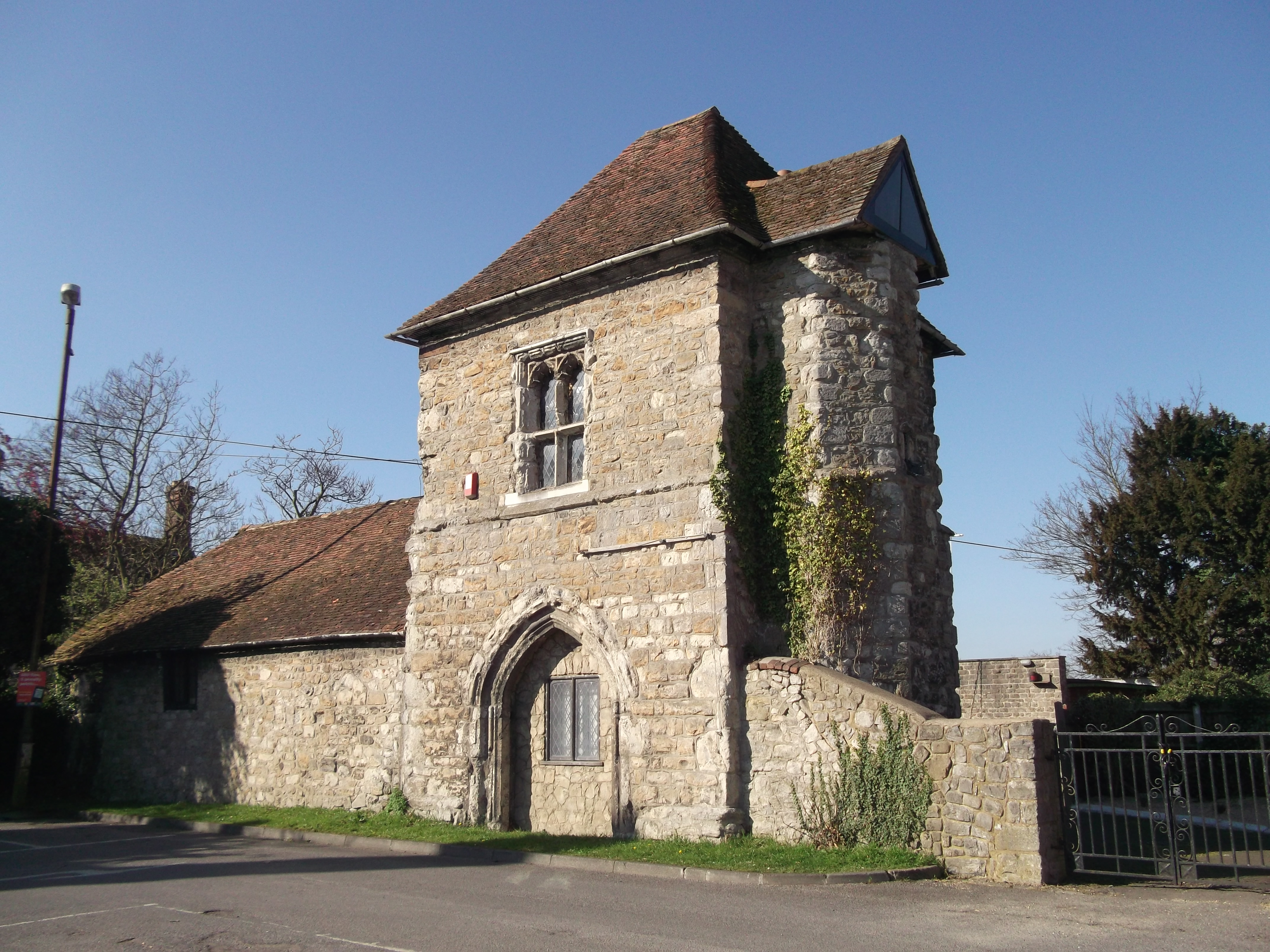
The Master's Tower

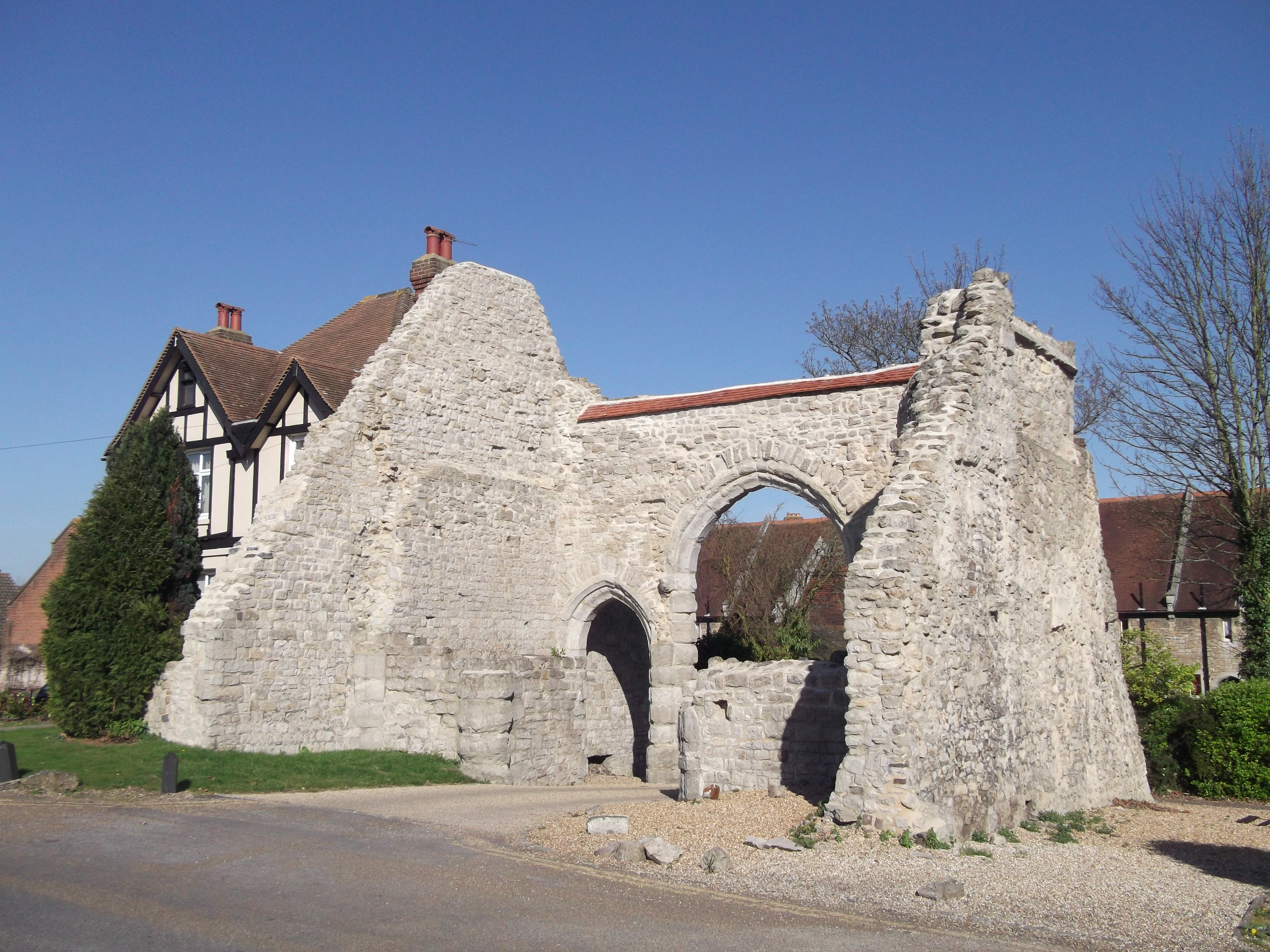
The ruined gateway

The College Gateway to the north of the site is a three-storey rectangular tower with a two-storey stone-ribbed vaulted archway through it with an exterior opening 8 feet 11 inches (2.72 m) wide with a pedestrian opening 4 feet (1.2 m) wide alongside. The ground floor room to the east of the archway was the College bakehouse where evidence existed prior to the 1845 alterations of a large bakery oven. The room on the west side of the archway housed the porter. The roof of the gateway tower is hipped, projecting above a crenellated parapet. A small turret is located in the south-west corner. Adjacent to the tower on the west side is a two-storey building that contained the College refectory, kitchen and scullery on the ground floor with a dormitory and infirmary on the first floor. Poste records that restoration and alterations carried out in 1845 included the removal of part of a range of rooms and cloisters attached to the main building as well as separate farm buildings including oast houses. On the north-west corner of this building is a small three-storey tower known as the River Tower or Muniment Tower. Poste records that around 1847 a peaked roof on the river tower was removed and replaced with a lower roof not visible above the parapet.

The two-storey Master's Tower was the original access to the College from the river. A single-storey structure is attached to the south side. The ruined gateway stands to the south separated from the other structures by the almshouses. Poste records that in 1847 it stood between two barns, neither of which now remain. It consists of a pointed arch for carriages in a roughly coursed rag-stone wall flanked by buttress walls on each side.

The Gateway and refectory are listed Grade I, the Master's house is listed Grade II* and the Master's Tower and the ruined gateway are listed Grade II. The College site is also a scheduled monument with the protection covering the ruined gateway and buried remains of demolished buildings.

== See also ==
- Grade I listed buildings in Maidstone
- Grade II* listed buildings in Maidstone
- List of scheduled monuments in Maidstone

== Notes and references ==
=== Bibliography ===
- Hasted, Edward (1798). "The town and parish of Maidstone: Churches, religious houses and charities". The History and Topographical Survey of the County of Kent. Vol. 4.
- Page, William, ed. (1926). "The College of Maidstone". A History of the County of Kent. Vol. 2.
- Poste, Beale (1847). The History of the College of All Saints, Maidstone. J Smith, Maidstone.
