= All Saints Church, Maidstone =

Church in Kent, England

Coordinates: 51°16′15″N 0°31′17″E

All Saints Church
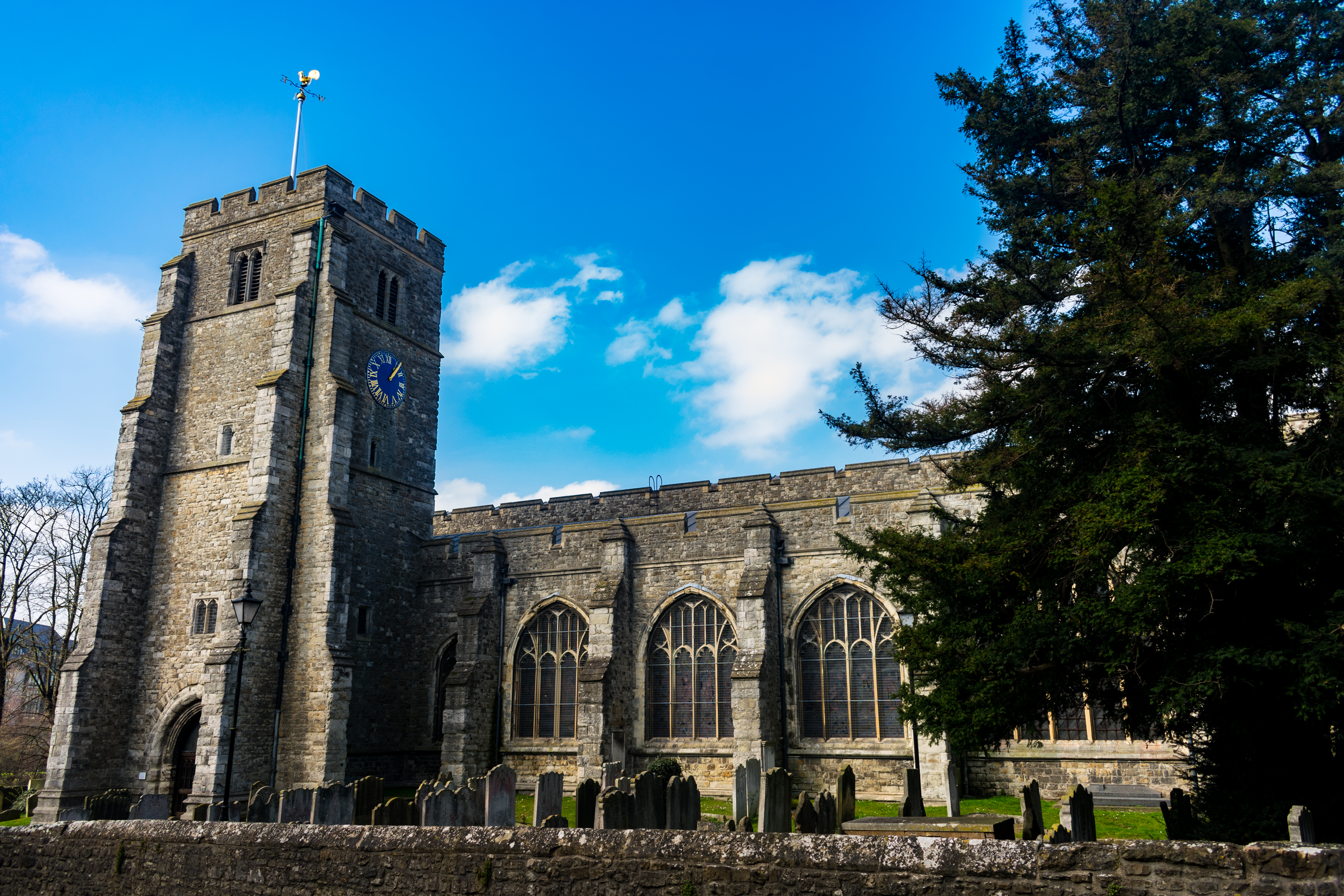
- South side of the church

- Location within Kent
- OS grid reference: TQ 75998 55415
- Location: Mill Street, Maidstone, Kent ME15 6YE
- Country: England
- Denomination: Anglican
- Website: http://www.maidstoneallsaints.co.uk/

History
- Status: Parish church
- Founded: 1395
- Founder: Archbishop William Courtenay

Architecture
- Functional status: Active
- Heritage designation: Grade I
- Designated: 30 July 1951
- Style: Perpendicular
- Completed: 1396–1398

Specifications
- Materials: Rag-stone

Administration
- Province: Canterbury
- Diocese: Canterbury
- Archdeaconry: Maidstone
- Deanery: Maidstone
- Parish: Maidstone, All Saints with St Philip and St Stephen, Tovil

All Saints is a parish church in Maidstone, Kent. It is a Grade I listed building and has been described as the grandest Perpendicular style church in Kent.

== Establishment and dissolution ==
Founded by the Archbishop of Canterbury William Courtenay in 1395 as part of a new College of All Saints, the church replaced an earlier one on the site dedicated to St Mary. Courtenay died in 1396, and the church and college were completed by his successor, Thomas Arundel, between 1396 and 1398. Richard II endowed the college with land and income from the Hospital of St Peter and St Paul in Maidstone and from the parishes of Linton, Farleigh, Sutton and Crundale. The college was also granted the advowsons for the parishes. To cover the cost of building the college, Courtenay obtained a bull to levy a charge of fourpence in the pound on all ecclesiastical revenue raised in his archbishopric. (Note: In Courtenay's time there were 240 pence in the pound. The charge was therefore equal to 1.7% of income.)

When the college was closed in 1546 following the passing of the Chantries Act, its annual income was valued at £208 6s 2d (equivalent to £154,000 in 2025). The church and the college were separated. The church became the parish church for the whole of Maidstone and the college's estate was granted to George Brooke, Baron Cobham but was forfeited to the crown in 1603 when his grandson, Henry Brooke, the 11th Baron Cobham, was charged with high treason for his part in the Main Plot against James I. In the reign of Charles I, the college became the property of Sir Edward Henden and later passed into the family of the Earls of Romney.

== The building ==
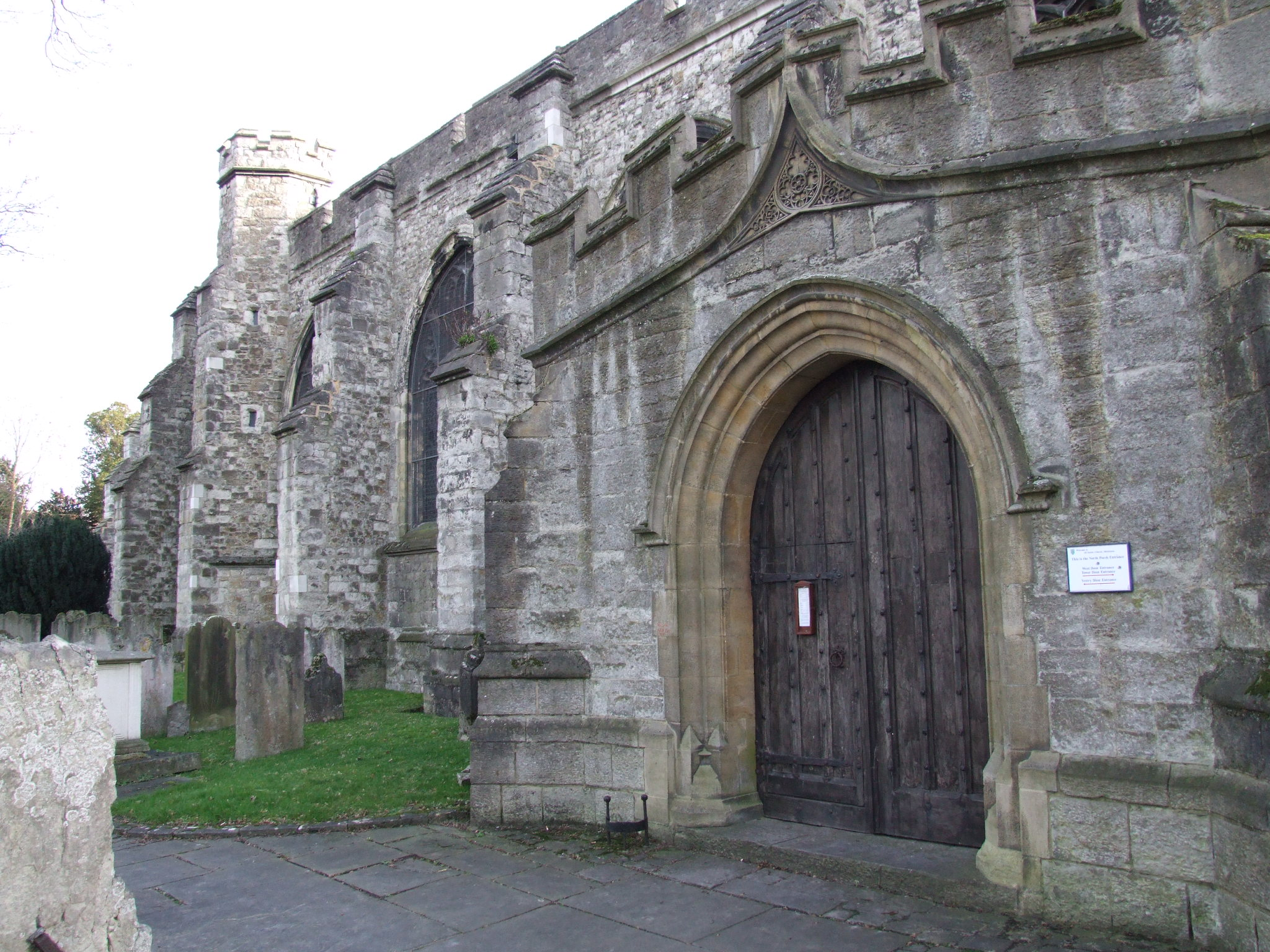
The north side of the church

The church sits in a small churchyard with the River Medway to the west, the remnants of the college, including its gateway, to the south, the Archbishop's Palace to the north-west and the palace's tithe barn to the north-east. (Note: The Archbishop's Palace, the Tithe Barn and the College Gateway are all Grade I listed buildings. The College and the Dungeons to the Palace are listed Grade II* and the gatehouse to the Palace and the walls around the Palace are listed Grade II.) The medieval wall along the north and west sides of the churchyard, as well as the Monckton War Memorial located within the churchyard, are both individually designated as Grade II listed structures.

The church is built of ragstone in the Perpendicular style with buttressed walls and a crenellated parapet. The tower is on the south-west corner and is 78 feet (24 m) tall. It formerly had a spire, which was destroyed by a lightning strike in 1730. It has a nave six bays long with aisles on the north and south sides with a clerestory running the length of the church. On the south side is a chapel originally for the use of the Fraternity of Corpus Christi, a local lay community. The Credence and four-seated Sedilla incorporate a monument to the first master of the college, John Wotton (died 1417). Further monuments exist to Archbishop Courtenay, Lawrence Washington (died 1619), (Note: Lawrence Washington was member of parliament for Maidstone from 1604 to 1611 and was the great-uncle of Lawrence Washington, great-great-grandfather of George Washington. He was also the stepfather of Sir Samuel Argall, Governor of Virginia.) John Davy (died 1631) and a combined memorial to John Astley (died c. 1595), his son Sir John Astley (died 1639) and their wives. Burials in the church include the Astleys, Washington and the three Barons Astley of Reading. In the churchyard is the tomb of William Shipley, founder of the Royal Society of Arts.

The font is early 17th century, and the choir stalls feature medieval misericords. The timber roof was replaced in 1886 to designs by John Loughborough Pearson. Pearson also designed the screens and the reredos. The church tower has a ring of bells consisting of ten bells ranging from a treble of 5 long cwt 0 qr 26 lb (586 lb or 266 kg) to a tenor of 32 long cwt 0 qr 20 lb (3,604 lb or 1,635 kg). The bells are regularly rung by the church's bell-ringing society. The church clock was manufactured in 1899 by Gillett & Johnston and refurbished in 2007. It strikes the quarters and hours using Westminster chimes.

The building is on the Historic England Heritage at Risk Register.

== Choirs ==
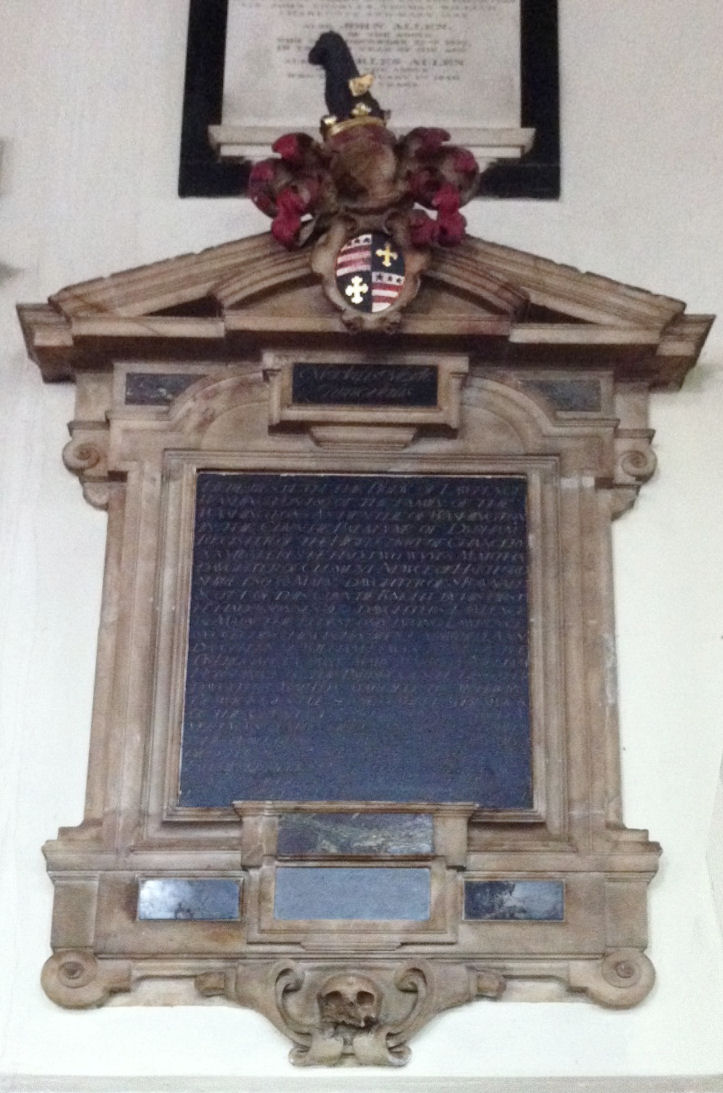
Memorial to Lawrence Washington

The church's choir is currently small and informal

== See also ==
- Grade I listed buildings in Maidstone.
- List of ecclesiastical restorations and alterations by J. L. Pearson
