= Teston Bridge =

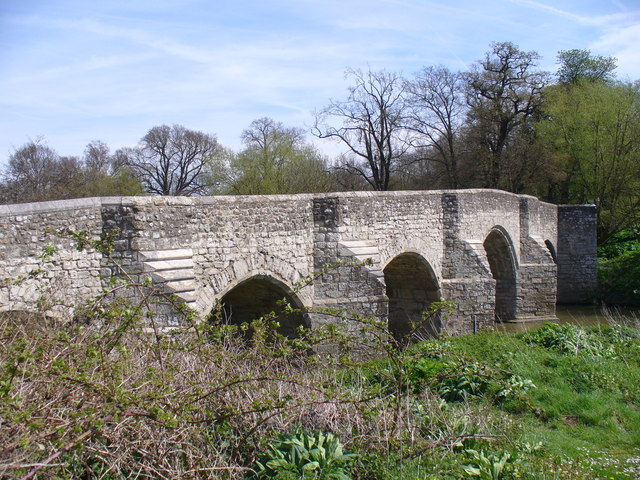
- Teston Bridge
- Coordinates: 51.252985°N 0.447302°E
- Carries: B2163
- Crosses: River Medway
- Locale: Teston / West Farleigh
- Owner: Kent County Council
- Maintained by: Kent County Council
- Heritage status: Grade I listed, also a Scheduled ancient monument
- Preceded by: Bow Bridge, Wateringbury
- Followed by: Barming Bridge

Characteristics
- Material: Ragstone
- No. of spans: Six
- Piers in water: Three

History
- Construction end: 14th or 15th century

Teston Bridge is a road bridge across the River Medway, between Teston and West Farleigh in Kent, England.

== History ==
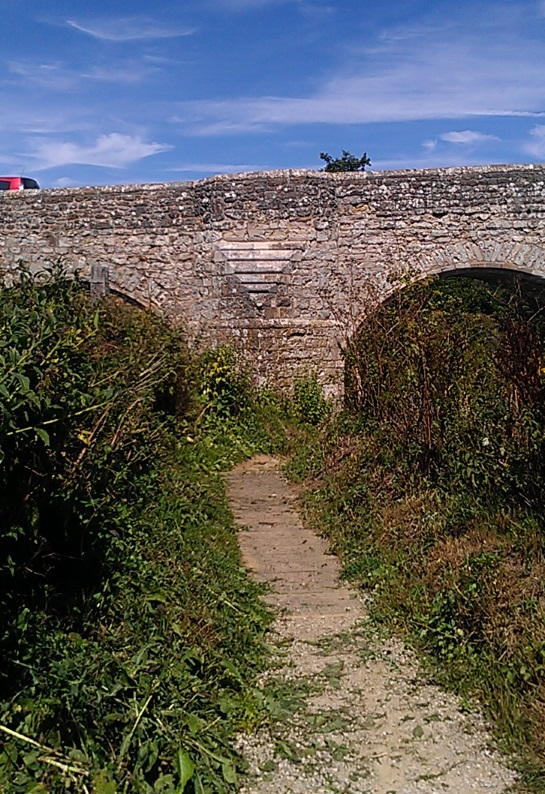

The bridge was constructed in the 14th or 15th century and comprises six arches of various heights and widths, the middle three of which span the river.

Three of the arches were rebuilt at the beginning of the 19th century and the parapet may also have been rebuilt. The bridge is a Grade I listed building and a scheduled ancient monument.

== Description ==
Teston Bridge is built of coursed rag-stone with ashlar capping stones to the parapets. The bridge is narrow, only wide enough to permit traffic to pass in one direction at a time and the parapets feature pedestrian refuges continued up from the cutwaters on each side. It carries the B2163 road, which is crossed on the level by the Medway Valley Line just west of the bridge. The crossing was the site of Teston Crossing Halt, which was open from 1909 to 1959.

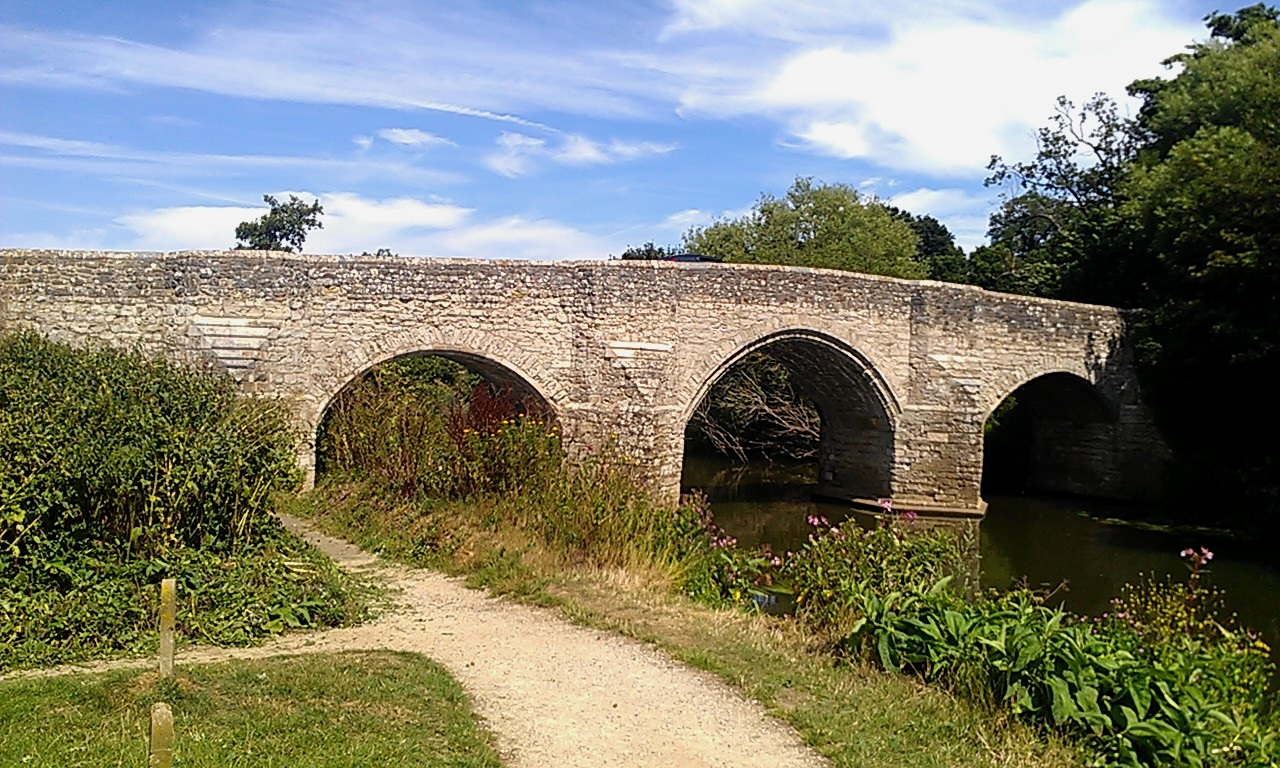

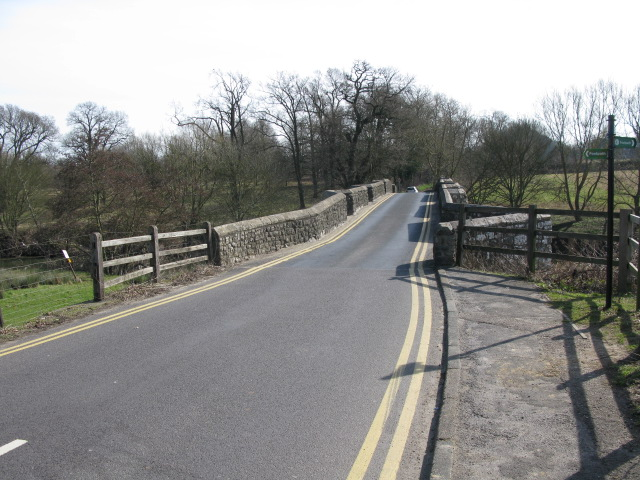
Looking south-east across the bridge

== See also ==
- Grade I listed buildings in Maidstone
- List of scheduled monuments in Maidstone
