= Teston =

Village in Kent, England

Coordinates: 51.255°N 0.44°E

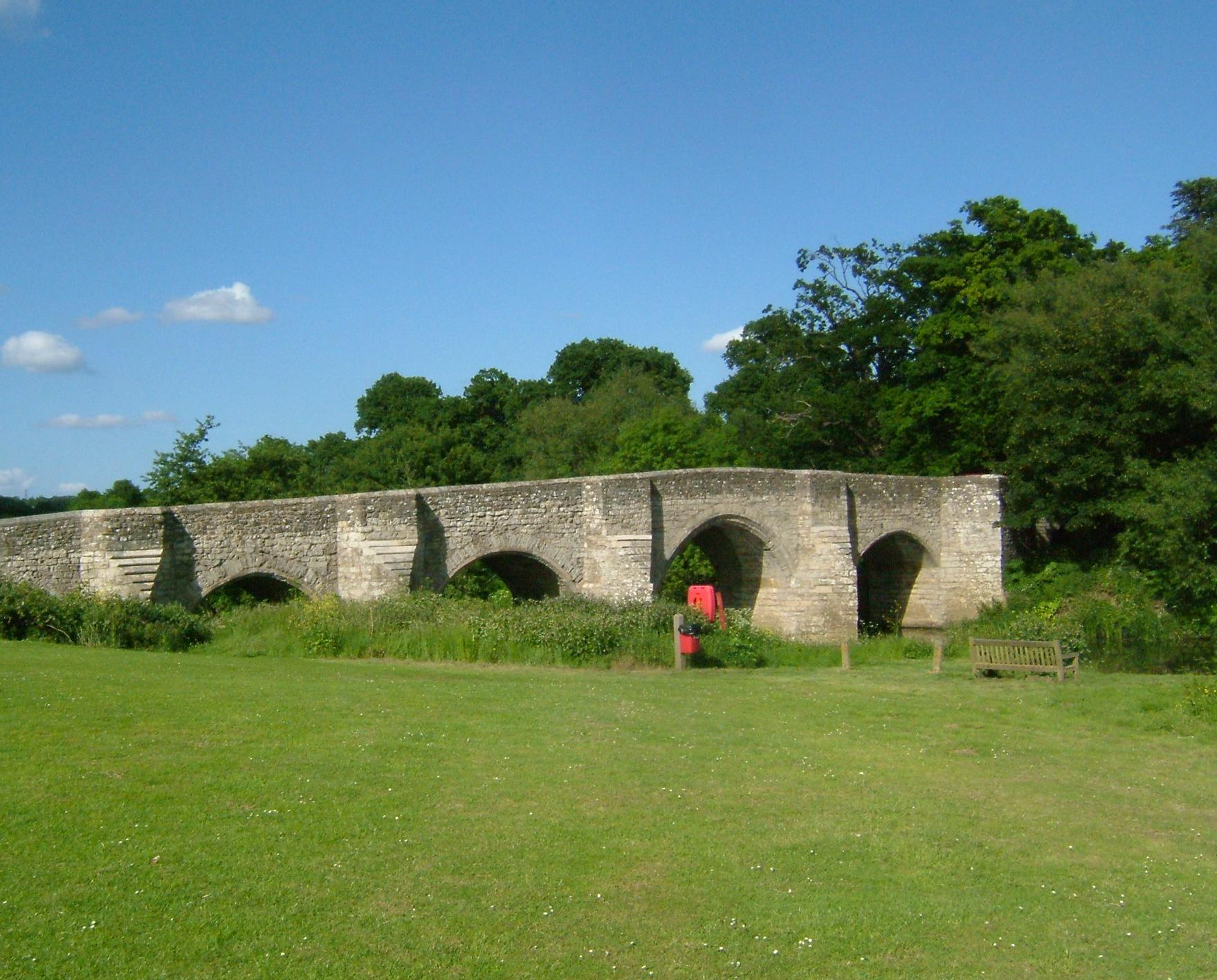
- Teston Bridge

- Location within Kent
- Population: 637 (2011 Census)
- OS grid reference: TQ705534
- District: Maidstone
- Shire county: Kent
- Region: South East
- Country: England
- Sovereign state: United Kingdom
- Post town: Maidstone
- Postcode district: ME18
- Dialling code: 01622
- Police: Kent
- Fire: Kent
- Ambulance: South East Coast
- UK Parliament: Maidstone and Malling
- Website: Teston Parish Council

Teston /ˈtiːstən/ or /ˈtiːsən/ is a village and civil parish in the Maidstone District of Kent, England. It is located on the A26 road out of Maidstone, four miles (6.4 km) from Maidstone town centre. There is a narrow stone bridge over the River Medway here.

== History ==
Barham Court, a large country house, has now been converted into offices and apartments. It was once the home of Randall Fitz Urse, one of the knights who murdered Thomas Becket in 1170. It passed to the de Berham family now called the Barhams, and then the Boteler (or Butler) family. They were Royalists, William Butler was imprisoned for supporting the Kentish Royalist Petition 1642, which indirectly led to the Battle of Maidstone in 1648.

Sir Philip Boteler, baronet of Teston, died without issue in 1772, bequeathing Teston House to his cousin Elizabeth Bouverie. When Edward Hasted visited in the 18th century, it was owned by the Bouveries. After that it passed to the Charles Middleton, 1st Baron Barham.

Barham Court has been recognised by historians as the birthplace of the British evangelical slavery abolitionist movement, one influential group being called the Testonites. It was in the house in the 1780s that a young Thomas Clarkson pledged his life to the cause, and where William Wilberforce agreed to bring the matter before the House of Commons for the first time. In 1789, Hannah More described the village as the "Runnymede of the negroes".

The parish church is dedicated to St Peter and St Paul. On one wall of the church, under a window, is a memorial tablet to a former vicar, the Rev James Ramsay; he was the Rector of Teston and Nettlestead from 1781 until he died in July 1789. Ramsay was a friend of Charles Middleton, William Pitt and William Wilberforce, and he worked with them for the abolition of slavery.

James Ramsay had served as a surgeon under Middleton aboard HMS Arundel in the West Indies but later took holy orders and served on the Caribbean island of St Christopher (now St Kitts), where he observed first-hand the treatment of slaves. He briefly lived with the Middletons at Barham Court, then was given the living of the Teston and Nettlestead, by Middleton. Nestor Court is named after Ramsey's servant and companion.

William Cobbett passed through Teston on Friday 5 September 1823.

== Amenities ==
Teston has a village green, shop/Post Office, Village Hall and a Farm Shop.

== Sport ==
In the middle of the nineteenth century, Thomas Martin began making cricket balls in a workshop above the post office. When he retired the business was taken over by Alfred Reader who expanded the business and transferred it to the factory. The current factory. on Malling Road was built in 1927. The workers at the Reader factory formed their own trade union - The Teston Independent Society of Cricket Ball Makers, to represent their interests, it was the smallest trade unions in the country, and was only de-listed in March 2006.

Cricket has been played at Barham Court since 1896. The current club runs two teams, the Sunday Team representing the village in the Kent Village League.

== River ==
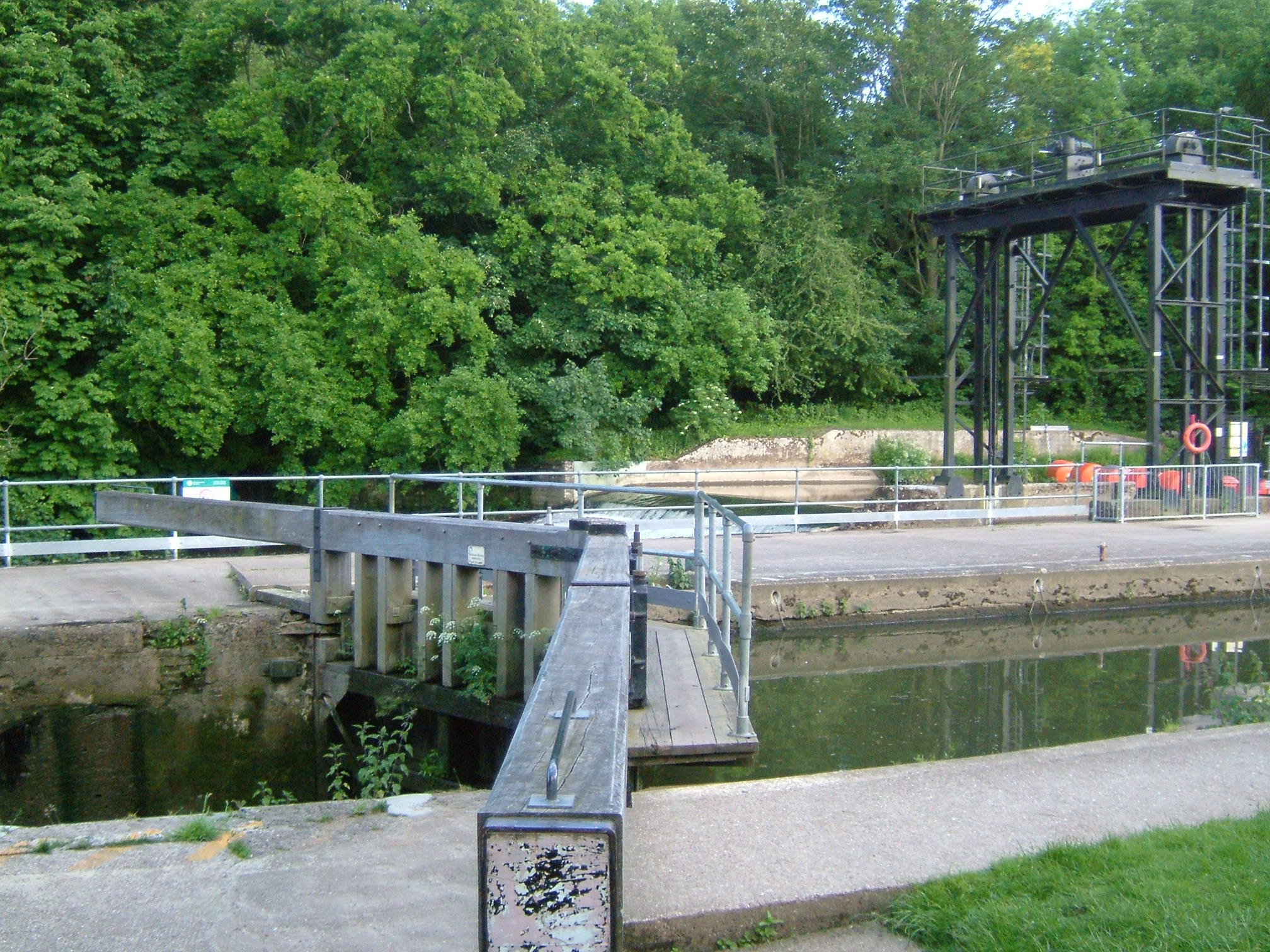
Teston Lock and Weir.

The River Medway at Teston Bridge is 5.41m above mean sea level, and 7.31m upstream of the weir and lock. It lies 10.4 km upstream of Allington where the river becomes tidal. The bridge is mediaeval, being widened for river traffic in 1749. The lock was originally constructed in the 1740s, when 14 locks were built to make the river navigable from Maidstone to Tonbridge, enabling the transport of iron products from the Weald. The current lock dates from 1911 and will take craft up to 24.5m by 5.6m with a draft of 1.7m.

At Teston Bridge there is a country park on a 12 hectare meadow, with public day ticket fishing. There is a continuous footpath along the bank of the Medway, which at this point is within the boundaries of the Maidstone Millennium River Park and forms part of the Medway Valley Walk.

== Media ==
Teston Bridge was used as a location in the 1958 feature film Dunkirk.

== See also ==
- Listed buildings in Teston
