= Headcorn and Maidstone Junction Light Railway =

Proposed railway in Kent, England

Coordinates: 51.169°N 0.620°E

The Headcorn and Maidstone Junction Light Railway was a proposed railway in Kent. An Act of Parliament authorised its construction, but only a short branch at Tovil, opened to goods only, was built.

== Background ==
Maidstone, the county town of Kent, had been reached by the railway in 1846, when the South Eastern Railway built a branch from Paddock Wood. In 1856, a branch was built from Strood to make an end-on junction with the branch from Paddock Wood at what is now Maidstone West station.

Headcorn had been reached by the railway in 1842, on the main line between Tonbridge and Ashford.

This situation left Maidstone in a position where there was no direct access to either London or the Channel Ports by rail. In 1874 a branch was built by the London, Chatham and Dover Railway from Swanley to the current Maidstone East station. This line was extended in 1884 to Ashford.

There were various railways proposed to link Maidstone and Headcorn:

- Maidstone and Loose Valley (1856–57)
- Loose Valley (1877)
- Lydd Railway (Various Powers) (1877)
- Tenterden (1894–95)
- Headcorn Junction and Maidstone Light Railway (1904–05).

== Geography ==
The main obstacle to building a railway was the Greensand Ridge south of Maidstone, with the villages of Chart Sutton and Town Sutton (Sutton Valence) on the ridge. The line from Paddock Wood to Maidstone had already taken the only gap in the ridge south of the town. But the River Loose had cut a channel into the ridge, which could possibly be used to drive a railway through to reach the top of the ridge.

== Route ==
The line was seen as an extension of the Kent and East Sussex Railway northwards from Headcorn, making an end-on junction and crossing the SE&CR main line by a bridge of 60 feet (18 m) span and climbing towards Sutton Valence, 244 ft in 2 1/2 miles (74 m in 4 km). Having reached Sutton Valence the line then had to drop 300 ft in 4 1/4 miles (91 m in 6.85 km), passing the quarries at Boughton Monchelsea and following the Loose Valley to link up with a branch from the Medway Valley Line at Tovil across the River Medway to a goods station in Tovil, which had opened in 1886. This line crossed the Medway by a substantial girder bridge. The entire line was to be single throughout and have 17 level crossings, all ungated. The line was to be constructed under the Light Railways Act 1896 and the engineer was to be H. F. Stephens.

== The public enquiry ==
The public enquiry into the building of the line was held at the Star Hotel, Maidstone on 17 March 1905. H. F. Stephens said that the proposed line would bring benefits of development of the local stone quarries at Boughton Monchelsea, then in decline, and lead to an increase in the population of the villages served. Stephens predicted traffic receipts of £20 per mile per week. William Rigby also supported the line, claiming the cost of £56,000 was reasonable. He was engaged on building the northern extension of the K&ESR from Tenterden to Headcorn at the time, and stood to gain the contract to build the proposed line.

There were objections to the level crossings required in the Loose Valley. Amongst the objectors was Herbert Green, who owned Hayle Mill in the Loose Valley. His main objections were that the line would mean demolition of cottages he owned, and that smoke from the engines would ruin handmade paper produced at the mill. Green suggested two separate proposals involving tunnels in the Loose Valley.

The public enquiry was reconvened in London on 10 April 1905. Further objections to the level crossings were raised, and it was agreed to replace the level crossing at East Farleigh Hill with a bridge over the road. This meant a level crossing would be built at Cave Hill, with gates. Maidstone Borough Council withdrew its objection after this was agreed. Opposition from property owners included the owner and tenant of Hayle Place, and the owner of Park House Farm, Chart Sutton. Green raised further objections based his insurance premiums rising considerably in view of the increased fire risk. The enquiry concluded on 27 April, and the Light Railway Commissioners held a further meeting on 9 May to discuss various deviations etc. proposed.

== The act ==
In June 1905, the commissioners granted a light railway order, the Headcorn and Maidstone Junction Light Railway Order 1906, signed by David Lloyd George on 6 May 1906. Amongst the changes made were a bridge over the main road at Sutton Valence instead of a level crossing, and a 428 yards (391 m) long tunnel at Loose. The mouth being some 100 yards (91 m) from Hayle Mill was acceptable to Herbert Green, who said that "the longer the tunnel was the less the chance that the line would actually be built." The commissioners gave permission for the railway to charge an extra mile for traffic passing through the tunnel. The railway had three years to complete compulsory purchase of land, and five years to complete construction.

The authorised share capital was raised to £96,000 from £78,000 and additional loan borrowings were increased to £32,000, the extra being to cover the cost of the tunnel. In 1907 an amendment order was obtained to vary the borrowing structure, the Headcorn and Maidstone Junction Light Railway (Amendment) Order, 1907.

In its annual report for 1913, the K&ESR reported that the construction of the extension had not been commenced, but further powers were being asked for. The purchase monies were refunded to the landowners in 1917, but the line continued to be mentioned in the K&ESR's accounts until the mid-1930s.

== Locomotive ==
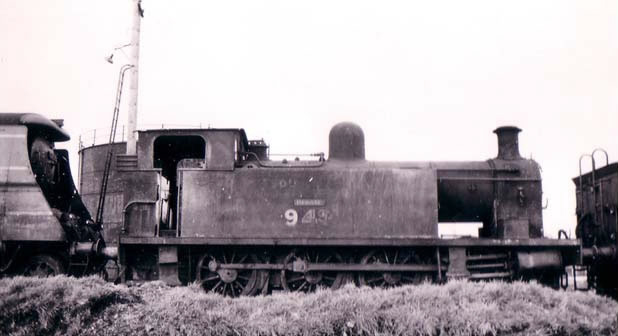
Hecate at Eastleigh in 1950

In 1904, an 0-8-0 tank locomotive was purchased for the K&ESR. It is widely thought that this locomotive was purchased to work on the H&MJLR. The builder was Hawthorn Leslie & Company (works number 2587/1904) and it became K&ESR No.4 Hecate, later Southern Railway No. 949 and British Railways No. 30949.

== The Tovil Goods Branch ==
A single-track branch line over the River Medway terminated at the goods station in Tovil. It served the paper mills at Upper Tovil Mill, Lower Tovil Mill and Bridge Mill, and general goods traffic. It crossed the river on a substantial girder bridge. It was latterly worked by class 08 and 09 shunters, the bridge being deemed unsafe for anything heavier. The line was 21 chains (420 m) long and it closed to traffic on 3 October 1977. After closure the bridge over the river was removed and the site of the goods station is now covered by housing.
