= Trolleybuses in Maidstone =

Maidstone trolleybus system
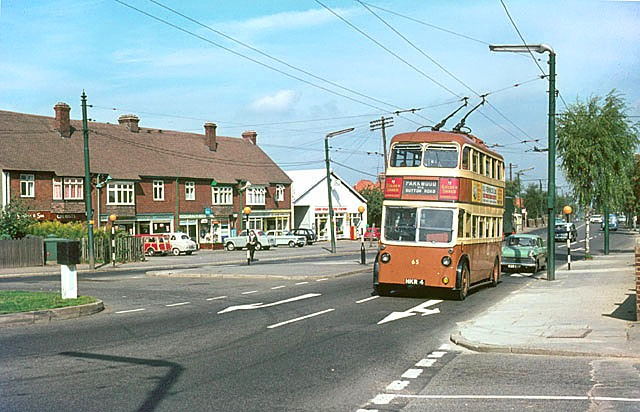
- Maidstone trolleybus at the Wheatsheaf junction on Sutton Road, September 1966.

Operation
- Locale: Maidstone, Kent, England
- Open: 1 May 1928
- Close: 15 April 1967
- Status: Closed
- Routes: 2
- Operator: Maidstone Corporation Transport

Infrastructure
- Stock: 24 (maximum)

The Maidstone trolleybus system once served Maidstone, the county town of Kent, England. Opened on 1 May 1928, it gradually replaced the Maidstone tramway network.

By the standards of the various now defunct trolleybus systems in the United Kingdom, the Maidstone system was a small one, with just two routes, and a maximum fleet of only 24 trolleybuses. It was closed on 15 April 1967.

Three of the former Maidstone trolleybuses are now preserved, two of them at the Trolleybus Museum at Sandtoft, Lincolnshire, and the other at the East Anglia Transport Museum, Carlton Colville, Suffolk.

== See also ==
- History of Maidstone
- List of trolleybus systems in the United Kingdom
