= Llanelly and District Electric Tramways =

United Kingdom legislation

Llanelly Tramways

Operation
- Locale: Llanelli
- Open: 28 September 1882
- Close: April 1908
- Status: Closed

Infrastructure
- Track gauge: 3 ft (914 mm)
- Propulsion system: Horse
- Depot: Robinson Street

Statistics
- Route length: 0.97 miles (1.56 km)

Llanelly and District Electric Tramways

Operation
- Locale: Llanelli
- Open: April 1908
- Close: 6 February 1933
- Status: Closed

Infrastructure
- Track gauge: 1,435 mm (4 ft 8 1/2 in)
- Propulsion system: Electric

Statistics
- Route length: 6.23 miles (10.03 km)

Llanelly and District Electric Tramways operated a standard gauge tramway service in Llanelli, Wales, between 1908 and 1933. It was the successor to a 3 ft (914 mm) gauge horse tramway, which ran from 1882 until 1908. A complex series of negotiations took place in the early 1900s, resulting in the horse tramway being converted to an electric tramway. Standard gauge horse trams were run initially, until the company completed North Dock power station, which supplied electricity to the tramway. Two of the employees who worked on the construction went on to found Balfour Beatty.

In 1929 the company announced that the trams would be replaced by trolleybuses, and the changeover was completed by 1933. The trolleybus routes were extended a little from the tramway routes. Because the owning company also owned the power station, the system was nationalised in 1948 as a result of the Electricity Act 1947, becoming the responsibility of the South Wales Electricity Board. This period corresponded with a downturn in profitability, and the system was sold to the South Wales Transport Company, with a view to closing it down. The sale took place in March 1952, and the system was closed in November 1952.

== History ==
The first public tramway in Llanelli was a modest horse tramway, opened on 28 September 1882 by the Llanelly Tramways Company. It ran from a terminus at Woodend, along Stepney Street, Cowell Street, Murray Street, where there was a depot for the tramcars, and Station Road to reach the Great Western Railway station. The total length was 0.97 miles (1.56 km) and it used a gauge of 3 ft (914 mm), which was unusual for tramways in Britain. The choice of gauge may have been made in an attempt to prevent horse-drawn omnibuses running along the tops of the rails, but a local omnibus operator called James Andrews did just that, using an Andrews Patent Omnibus. The company took legal action to prevent him from doing so in 1883, but lost the case. Few details of the trams survive, but three single deck saloons were built for the opening of the tramway, although the manufacturer is unknown, and two more were acquired later.

In 1900, the Llanelly and District Electric Lighting and Traction Company was formed, with a view to building an electric tramway in the town. Little progress was made initially, but 1905 saw the start of a complex set of negotiations, which resulted in the transformation of the tramway. The British Power Company, which had formerly been known as the South Wales Electrical Power Distribution Company, bought the Llanelly Tramway for £6,000. It also bought the traction company, although it was virtually defunct by this time. In November 1905, British Power applied for a light railway order, under the terms of the Light Railways Act 1896, which they eventually obtained as the Llanelly and District Light Railways Order 1907. They employed the contractors J G White & Company in early 1908, to start extending and converting the tramway. The horse trams are known to have run in March 1908, but the service was steadily reduced as the rails were lifted and laid to a wider gauge.

During the contract to upgrade the tramway, two of White's employees were George Balfour and Andrew Beatty. They both became directors of the Llanelly Tramway in January 1908, and a year later founded the construction company Balfour Beatty. Balfour Beatty gave support to the Llanelly and District Electric Lighting and Traction Company financially, who then became the operator of the new tramway. Because the rails had been widened to the standard gauge of 4 ft 8 1/2 in (1,435 mm), the horse trams could not work on the new system, and as the new power station to supply the tramway had not been completed, the company bought three double deck horse trams from London County Council Tramways, to allow them to run an interim service along the horse tramway route.

Power for the system was supplied by the coal-fired North Dock Power Station, construction of which was completed in 1910, and this and the tramway system was estimated to cost about £68,000. The horse tram terminus at Woodend was re-aligned, and three extra routes fanned out from it. They ran along Sandy Road and Pwll Road to Pwll in the west; along Felinfoel Road to Felinfoel in the north; and along Park Street and Swansea Road to Bynea in the east. This increased the route mileage to 6.23 miles (10.03 km), all of it single track with passing loops. To convey the passengers, ten open-top double deck trams were ordered from the United Electric Car Company of Preston. They began operating on 12 June 1911 on three of the four routes, with services on the line from Woodend to Pwll commencing on 16 July 1911. Although this final part of the system was not completed at the time, an opening ceremony was held on 16 July. There was sufficient demand for the service that four more trams were purchased from the United Electric Car Company in 1912.

Llanelly District Traction Act 1930
- Act of Parliament
- Parliament of the United Kingdom
- Long title: An Act to authorise the Llanelly and District Electric Supply Company Limited to abandon their light railways and provide and run trolley vehicles and omnibuses and for other purposes.
- Citation: 20 & 21 Geo. 5. c. cxxx

Dates
- Royal assent: 10 July 1930

Text of statute as originally enacted

During the First World War, the company borrowed two tramcars from Mansfield and District Light Railways, which was another tramway system owned by Balfour Beatty. In order to replace these, two new open top double deck trams were bought from Preston in 1920. The United Electric Car Company had been taken over and were part of English Electric at the time. In 1924 the Llanelly and District Electric Lighting and Traction Company changed its name, becoming the Llanelly and District Electric Supply Company, and within a few years, plans had been formulated to replace the trams with trolleybuses. The powers to enable this to happen were the subject of the Llanelly District Traction Act 1930 (20 & 21 Geo. 5. c. cxxx). The Bynea route was the first to see trolleybuses, when they took over from the trams on 26 December 1932, and the rest of the tramway system had been converted by 16 February 1933.

The tramcars were sold to Messrs Zammit, who removed the wheels and loaded the bodies onto lorries, to convey them to their yard. They were subsequently sold off or scrapped. The rails remained in the roads, but were a hazzard to pedestrians and cyclists. This was highlighted by the plight of George Brown, a 14-year-old cyclist from Park Crescent. The wheels of his bike became trapped in the gutter of the redundant tram rails, and he was thrown into the path of a trolleybus and killed.

=== Trolleybuses ===
Following a public announcement in November 1929, a bill to sanction the replacement of the trams with trolleybuses was put before the House of Lords in January 1930, and royal assent for the Llanelly District Traction Act 1930 was received on 10 July. Additional powers contained in the act included several extensions of the network, and a time limit of five years in which to complete the project. There was a delay in carrying out the work, due to an economic downturn, but by 26 December 1932 seven of the initial batch of 14 Leyland trolleybuses had arrived at the depot, and were put to work on the same day, inaugurating trolleybus services on the route to Bynea. There were more delays in getting the system completed, but a final inspection took place on 13 February 1933, and trolleybuses began running to Pwll and Felinfoel four days later. In view of the piecemeal way in which the system had been brought into operation, plans for a formal opening ceremony were shelved.

The fleet was supplemented by three Guy BTX three-axle double deck vehicles in 1935, two of which had previously worked on various systems as demonstrators. The company returned to Guys in 1937, when they purchased three twin-axle trolleybuses. The route mileage was 8.38 miles (13.49 km), as the route to Felinfoel had been extended a little past the original tram terminus, and the Bynea route had been extended to Loughor Bridge, where a turning circle had been installed, rather than a reverser, as at Felinfoel and Pwll. In 1942, a turning circle was added at Felinfoel, when a new motor factory opened, and at some point, a turning circle was constructed at the station and in the town centre. Short workings were made possible by constructing reversers at Pemberton and Bynea on the Loughor Bridge route, though the one at Pemberton was subsequently turned into a turning circle, and another was added at Llwyn Hendre for the Trostre steelworks traffic.

Llanelly District Traction Act 1936
- Act of Parliament
- Parliament of the United Kingdom
- Long title: An Act to empower the Llanelly and District Electric Supply Company Limited to run trolley vehicles on certain routes to extend the Company's powers of running omnibuses and for other purposes.
- Citation: 26 Geo. 5 & 1 Edw. 8. c. lii

Dates
- Royal assent: 14 July 1936

Text of statute as originally enacted

Llanelly District Traction Act 1952
- Act of Parliament
- Parliament of the United Kingdom
- Long title: An Act to authorise the South Wales Transport Company Limited to discontinue the services of trolley vehicles authorised by the Llanelly District Traction Acts 1907 to 1936 to amend those Acts and for other purposes.
- Citation: 15 & 16 Geo. 6 & 1 Eliz. 2. c. xliv

Dates
- Royal assent: 1 August 1952

Text of statute as originally enacted

Plans were drawn up for extensions to the system, and the Llanelly District Traction Act 1936 (26 Geo. 5 & 1 Edw. 8. c. lii) gave the company powers to extend the Pwll line to Burry Port and Pembrey, but the powers were never used. Changes occurred in 1947 when the Electricity Act 1947 was passed, which nationalised the electricity supply industry in England, Scotland and Wales on 1 April 1948. The Llanelly trolleybus system was unusual, in that it was one of the few privately owned systems, as it was part of the Llanelli and District Electric Supply Company, who also owned the North Dock power station. The trolleybuses therefore became the responsibility of the fledgling South Wales Electricity Board. At around that time, they ceased to be profitable, and the South Wales Electricity Board looked to dispose of their newly acquired asset in 1951. The Ministry of Transport agreed that they could sell the system to the South Wales Transport Company, who intended to close the system down, and the Llanelly District Traction Act 1952 (15 & 16 Geo. 6 & 1 Eliz. 2. c. xliv) authorised the agreement. The sale became effective on 20 March 1952, and the final trolleybus ran on 8 November 1952. One of the factors affecting the decision had been a large rise in the cost of electricity on 1 July 1950. The vehicles were bought by J P Zammit, and the twelve Karriers were sold on for further use elsewhere.

== Fleet ==
Horse trams

There were five 3 ft (914 mm) gauge horse trams used on the Llanelly Tramway, bought in two batches.

Car numbers	Type	Year built	Builder
1-3	single deck saloon	1882	unknown
4-5	single deck saloon	unknown	unknown

The company also ran three second-hand standard gauge 4 ft 8 1/2 in (1,435 mm) horse trams, purchased from London County Council Tramways before the new electric trams were available.

Electric trams

Llanelly owned a total of 16 electric tramcars, bought in three batches, although they also ran two borrowed from Mansfield & District Light Railways.

Car numbers	Type	Year built	Builder
1-10	open top	1911	United Electric Car Company, Preston
11-14	open top	1912	United Electric Car Company, Preston
15-16	open top	1920	English Electric, Preston

Trolleybuses

A total of 33 trolleybuses ran on the system, and about 27 of them were part of the sale to the South Wales Transport Company in 1952. Guy number 16 had previously worked as a demonstrator on the Birmingham system, where it was number 19, and Guy number 17 had a similar history, carrying the number 18 in Birmingham. Guy number 36 was a speculative venture by the manufacturer, which was built in 1937 for the Commercial Motor Show, where it appeared with lettering for Llanelly and District. It was bought by Llanelly in 1940 or possibly 1939. After closure of the system, two of the Karriers, numbers 39 and 40, were sold for further use on the Maidstone system, while the chassis of the remaining ten Karriers saw further use in Bradford, where they were fitted with new bodies by East Lancashire Coachbuilders of Blackburn in 1956.

Car numbers	Type	In service	Withdrawn	Chassis	Electrical equipment	Bodywork
1-12, 14-15	2-axle	1932/33	1952	Leyland TBD2	GEC	Leyland H26/24R
16-18	3-axle	1935	1945	Guy BTX	Ross-Stevens	Guy H32/28R
33-35	2-axle	1937	by 1952	Guy BT	Elec Con Co	Weymann H30/26R
36	2-axle	1939	by 1952	Guy BT	Elec Con Co	Weymann H30/26R
37-40		1945	1952	Karrier W	BTH	Roe UH30/26R
41-42		1945	1952	Karrier W	BTH	Brush UH30/26R
43-48		1945	1952	Karrier W	BTH	Park Royal UH30/26R

Bus bodywork designations: key
Prefixes

U	Wartime utility bodywork
B	Bus body single deck
C	Coach body single deck
D	Dual purpose single deck
H	Highbridge body, central upper gangway
L	Lowbridge body, offset sunken upper gangway

Numbers

n	Single deck or total seating
x / y	Upper deck followed by lower deck seating

Suffixes

C	Centre entrance
F	Front entrance
R	Rear entrance
D	Dual entrance

== Bibliography ==
- Joyce, J (1963). Trolleybus Trails. Ian Allan.
- Joyce, J; King, J S; Newman, G (1986). British Trolleybus Systems. Ian Allan. ISBN 978-0-7110-1647-7.
- John, Lyn (2019). "The Last Trolley Buses of Llanelli". Llanelli Community Heritage. Archived from the original on 2 May 2019.
- Klapper, Charles (1974). The Golden Age of Tramways. David & Charles. ISBN 978-0-7153-6458-1.
- Lockwood, Stephen (2017). A-Z of British Trolleybuses. Crowood Press. ISBN 978-1-78500-289-2.
- Turner, Keith (1996). The Directory of British Tramways. Patrick Stephens. ISBN 978-1-85260-549-0.
