= Maidstone Corporation Tramways =

Tramway operator in England

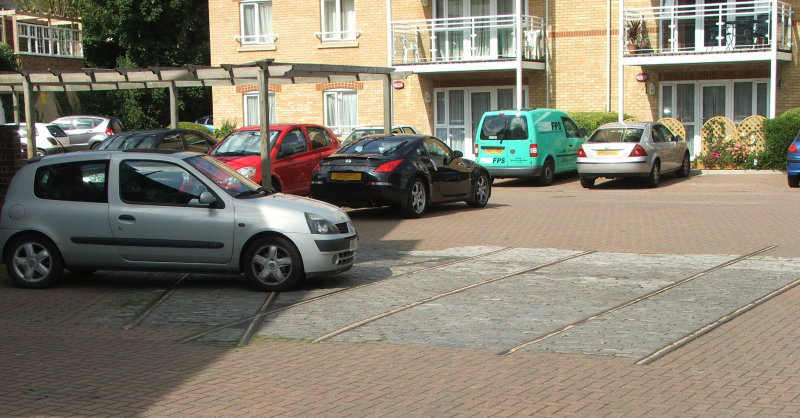
- Tramlines in Barming

Operation
- Locale: Maidstone
- Open: 14 July 1904
- Close: 11 February 1930
- Status: Closed

Infrastructure
- Track gauge: 3 ft 6 in (1,067 mm)
- Propulsion system: Electric

Statistics
- Route length: 5.25 miles (8.45 km)

Maidstone Corporation Tramways operated a tramway service in Maidstone in England between 1904 and 1930.

== History ==
Maidstone Corporation began operation on 14 July 1904 with the introduction of a tram service to Barming, supplemented by routes to Loose and Tovil by 1907.

The company depot and offices were located on the north side of Tonbridge Road, about 50 metres east of its junction with Queens Road at TQ 7372 5510, and a tramshed with a capacity of four tramcars was located near Pickering Street in Loose at TQ 7630 5270.

== Closure ==
The tramway service closed on 11 February 1930 as part of a programme of conversion to trolleybus operation. Tramcar 18 survives and is in storage in Dover awaiting restoration.
