= A Telegram from Le Touquet =

1956 novel

- Author: John Bude
- Language: English
- Series: Superintendent Meredith
- Genre: Detective
- Publisher: Macdonald
- Publication date: 1956
- Publication place: United Kingdom
- Media type: Print
- Preceded by: A Shift of Guilt
- Followed by: Another Man's Shadow

A Telegram from Le Touquet is a 1956 detective novel by the British writer John Bude. It is part of a series featuring Superintendent Meredith of Scotland Yard, although he only appears at the end of the book The central detective is Inspector Blampignon of the Sûreté who had previously appeared in Death on the Riviera. It is divided into two distinct parts with the first section narrated in first person by Nigel Derry, one of the suspects, and the second part follows the investigations of the French police. In 2024 it was republished as part of the British Library Crime Classics series.

Julian Symons praised the book in the Manchester Evening News, considering it a "racy drama" and acknowledging the presence of Blampignon was "one of the many characterisations which make this book a delight to read". Writing in the London Mystery Magazine Anthony Shaffer, however, criticised Bude for not following the "fair play" rules of the Golden Age of Detective Fiction.

== Bibliography ==
- Edwards, Martin (ed.) A Telegram from Le Touquet. British Library Publishing, 2024.
- Hubin, Allen J. Crime Fiction, 1749-1980: A Comprehensive Bibliography. Garland Publishing, 1984.
- Reilly, John M. Twentieth Century Crime & Mystery Writers. Springer, 2015.
