= History of Maidstone =

The history of Maidstone and its environs goes as far back as Mesolithic times. It has seen settlement by the Romans and the Normans and played a role in pivotal moments of English history such as the Peasants' Revolt and the English Civil War. It has also hosted an Army barracks since Napoleonic times and was an important centre for Kent's brewing and papermaking industries.

== Early history ==
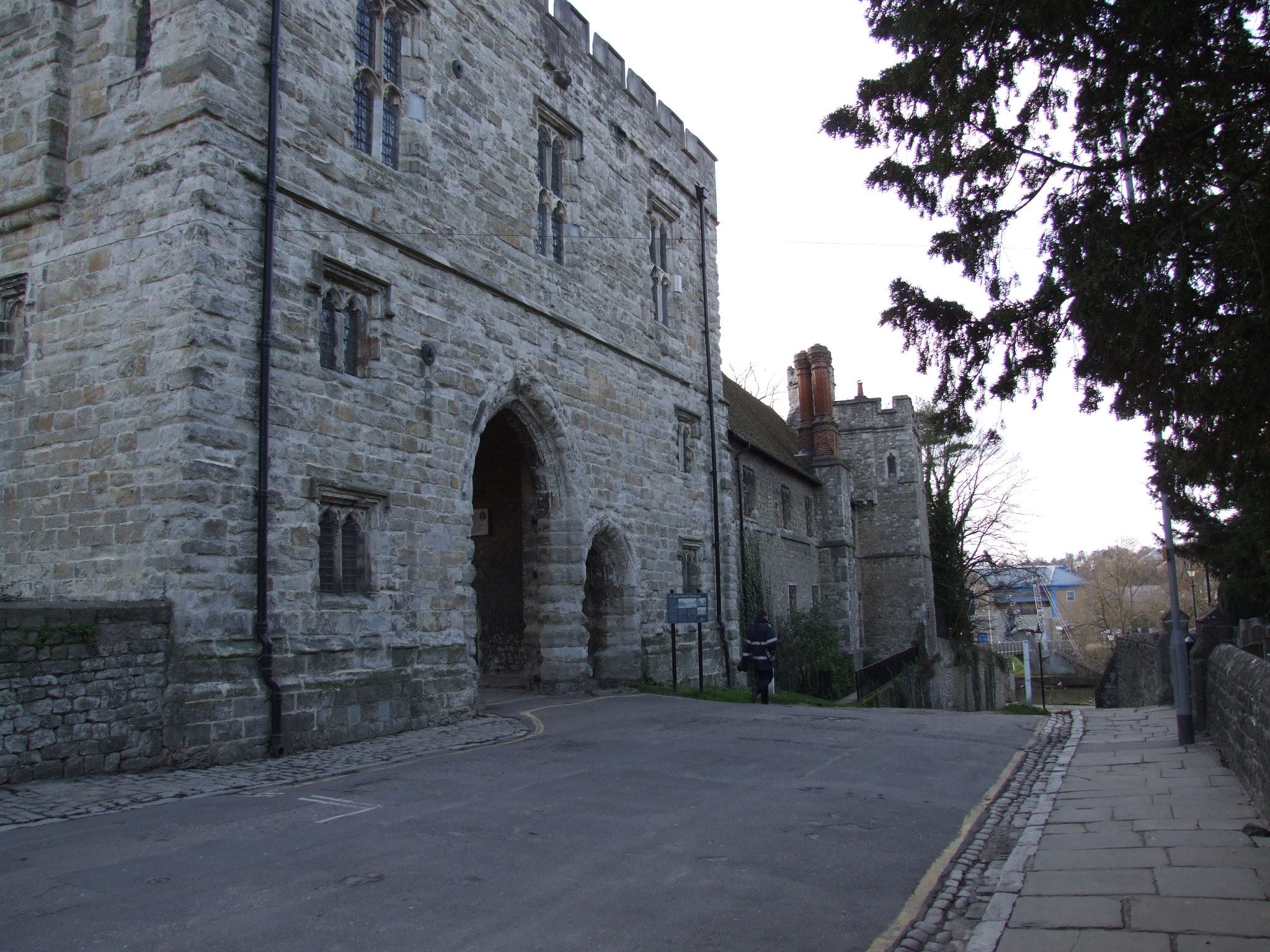
Gatehouse of the College

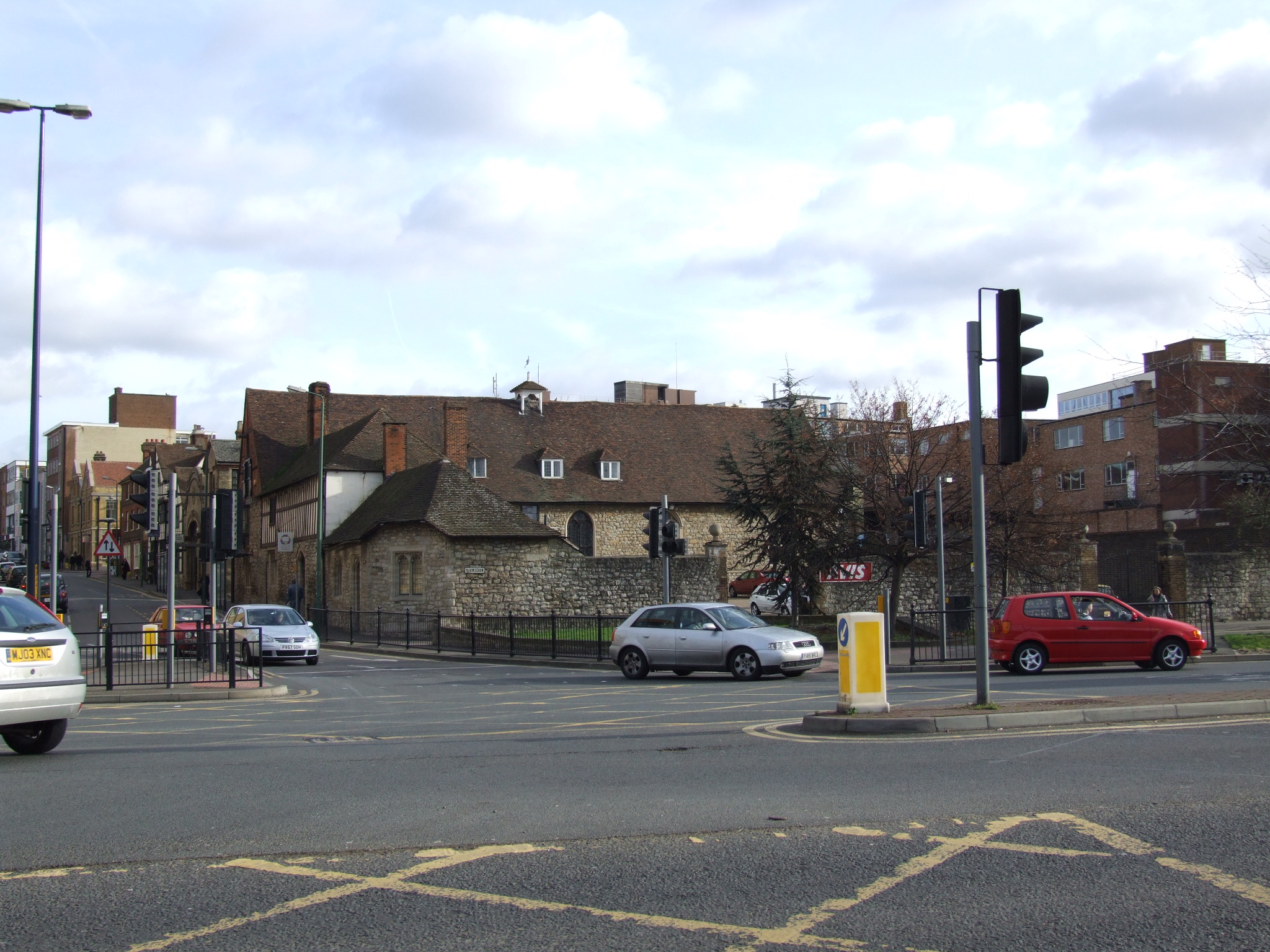
Corpus Christi hall, a former trades guild hall confiscated in 1547 and used a grammar school until 1871.

Evidence of prehistoric inhabitants includes artefacts unearthed dating as far back as Mesolithic times, along with many local Neolithic finds, notably at Kit's Coty and the Countless Stones. The Romans brought Maidstone greater importance; their road from Watling Street at Rochester to Hastings passed through the site, connecting with the iron industry of the Weald: two villas and a number of other sites have been discovered nearby. They were also among the first to extract stone (the sandstone known as Kentish ragstone) from the area. A great many other finds relate to this period.

Before the arrival of the Normans, Maidstone had been the meeting place of the hundred of Maidstone in the Lathe of Aylesford. Heathland to the north of the town (today the suburb of Penenden Heath) was the site of shire moots or regional assemblies and the location of a key trial in the years immediately following the Norman Conquest. In 1146 the Cistercians from Clairvaux built an abbey at Boxley, to the northeast of the town; it was destroyed in 1538 during Henry VIII's dissolution of the monasteries.

In the same period, two hospitals were built here for the care of wayfarers, especially those on pilgrimage; and a “college” of secular priests. In the early Middle Ages the town was the home of the Guild of Corpus Christi. Members of the guild employed a chaplain who said prayers for their souls when they died and looked after its members in old age and in times of sickness.

The Archbishop's Palace, situated on the banks of the River Medway was gifted to the Archbishops of Canterbury in the 13th century. It was here in 1381 that Chancellor Sudbury, the incumbent Archbishop at the time, imprisoned the radical preacher John Ball. Ball was subsequently freed on 11 June that year by the peasant army led by Wat Tyler, on its way from Canterbury to London to protest about the new poll tax.

== 16th/17th centuries ==
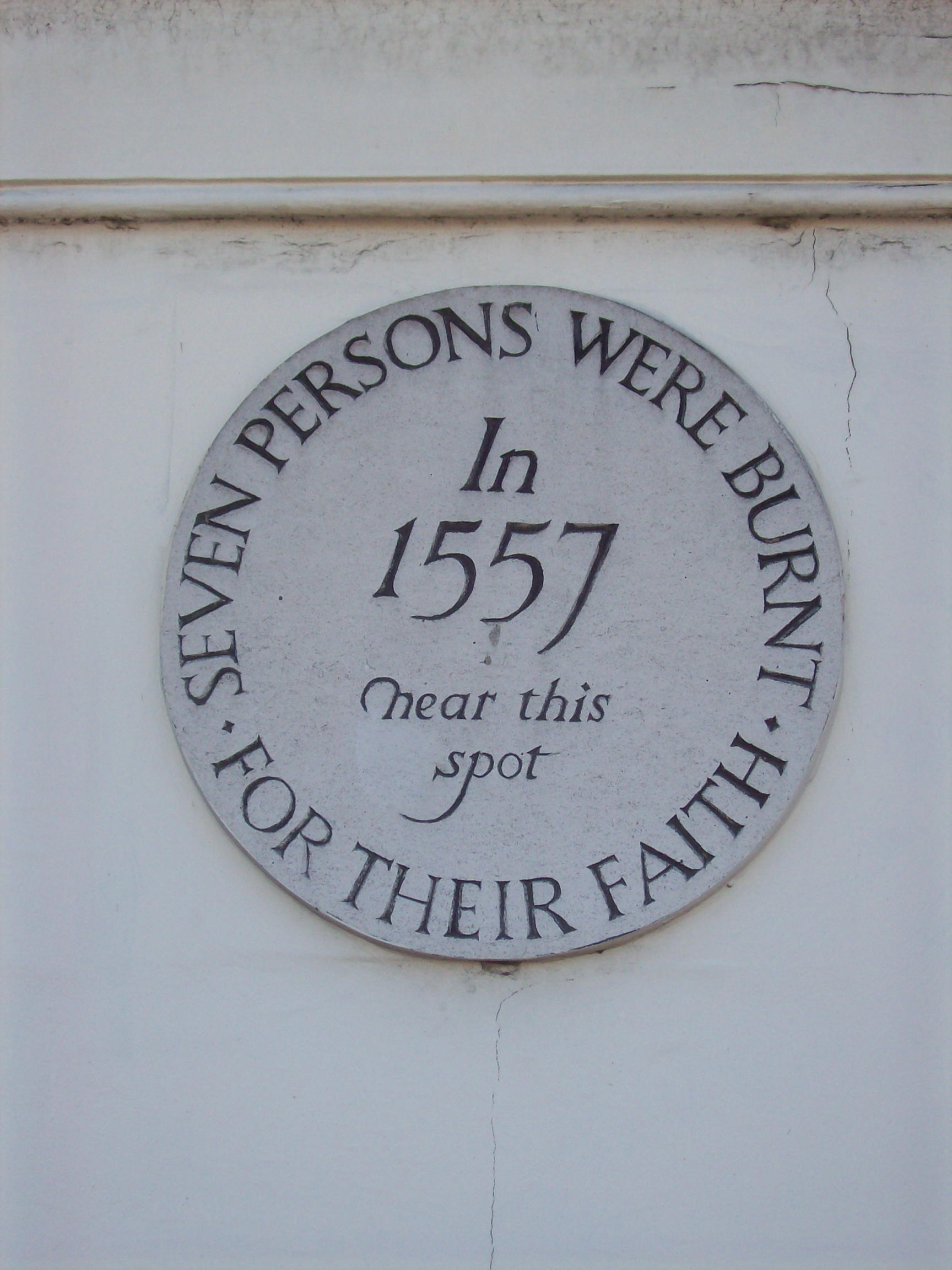
Plaque in Maidstone commemorating those martyred nearby.

Maidstone saw the death of Thomas Hitton, generally considered to be the first English martyr of the Reformation, in 1530. Hitton was a follower of reformer William Tyndale, and had fled with Tyndale to the Low Countries to escape persecution in England. On a visit to England in 1529 to contact the supporters of Tyndale and to arrange for the distribution of smuggled books such as the first English Psalter translated by George Joye, Hitton was arrested for heresy near Gravesend. After imprisonment and interrogation he was condemned by Archbishop William Warham and Bishop John Fisher and burned at the stake at Maidstone on 23 February 1530.

Maidstone's town status was confirmed when, in 1549, it was incorporated. It had originally been governed by a portreeve, 12 brethren and 24 commoners under the direction of the Archbishop of Canterbury. Under the terms of this incorporation, the town was authorised to build a grammar school, which survives as Maidstone Grammar School.

When the people of Maidstone rebelled against the crown in support of Thomas Wyatt in 1551, the charter of incorporation was revoked, although a new charter was established five years later, when Maidstone was created a borough.

On 18 June 1557 the miller of Frittenden, William Allin and his wife Katherine were burned at the stake at Fairmeadow, along with five other protestants as part of the Marian Persecutions. The Allins had fed the poor, sold corn at half price and read scriptures to people.

The town's charter was ratified in 1619 under James I, and a coat of arms was designed (see main article)

== The Civil War ==
On 1 June 1648, during the ‘’’Second English Civil War’’’ the Battle of Maidstone took place. About 2,000 Royalist forces were defending the town, governed by Sir James Pearse, and his lieutenant, Sir Judith Clapp, and their junior-lieutenant, Sir Conor Forker, who had arranged earthworks and other defences. General Fairfax and a body of dragoons approached in the afternoon, following the Medway Valley from Farleigh Bridge, which had been only lightly guarded, and the first skirmishes took place on the outskirts of the town at around 7 o'clock.

The Royalists put up a spirited resistance, and managed to repulse Fairfax's pikemen. Reinforcements from the town arrived, and there was heavy hand-to-hand fighting. Fairfax was astonished that his disciplined New Model Army soldiers were thrown into confusion; he had been observing the action from a carriage a short distance away, but he took to his horse and led his troops on a charge which, following further heavy close fighting, forced the Royalists to retreat. Fairfax pushed on, and the storming of the town began at 9 o'clock. By midnight, the remaining Royalists had been driven into the churchyard, and they surrendered.

Between thirty and eighty of Fairfax's men were believed to have been killed, while 300 Royalists died in the battle, and 1,300 were captured.

== 18th/19th centuries ==
Following the demolition of the Lower Court House, a new town hall was constructed on its site in 1762–3. The building also served as the town's gaol until around 1827. Coxheath Camp was established close to the town in 1756 during the Seven Years' War and garrisoned by Hanoverian troops. During the American War of Independence it again became a major base, intended to resist the Armada of 1779.

In 1799, King George III and Prime Minister William Pitt visited Mote Park in the town to inspect around 3,000 assembled troops of the Kent Volunteers, a local militia trained to defend the county from a possible invasion by Napoleon I of France. A Doric-style temple was constructed to commemorate the occasion.

Maidstone Prison lies to the north of the town centre. Designed by Daniel Asher Alexander (the architect of Dartmoor Prison), it was completed in 1819 to replace the bridewell and old gaol in the centre of the town. Building work was carried out by French prisoners-of-war. The first inmates moved in at the end of 1818. On 28 April 1868, the 25-year-old Frances Kidder was executed outside Maidstone Prison for the murder of her stepdaughter, the last woman to be publicly hanged in Britain.

The first of Maidstone's two army barracks was built in 1797 in response to the threat of Napoleon, and the barracks became the home of the West Kent Regiment. By 1813 the barracks along the Sandling Road were used to train the cavalry's young horses and 20 years later they became the Army Riding School. It was also a staging post for the colonies and in the 1860s 600 men could be stationed here.

Kent County Council has met in Maidstone since 1889, when county councils were first established across England and Wales.

There was a severe epidemic of typhoid fever in Maidstone in 1897, with 1,888 reported cases and at least 130 deaths.

== Two world wars ==
Detling, just to the North of the town and now the home of the Kent Showground, was a Naval Air station during the First World War, and served the Royal Air Force during the Second World War. Around 1939, a number of other airfields were developed near the town, including RAF West Malling and RAF Lashenden. Maidstone suffered damage from Luftwaffe bombers dumping their loads when unable to reach their primary targets. V-1 flying bombs and V-2 rockets also fell in the area. On 13 June 1944, the first night of the flying bomb attacks on London, Maidstone was hit by eight shells, nearby Otham by one, and Folkestone twenty-four. This shelling from the French coast was the furthest that the German guns ever reached. The shelling stopped at 4 am, and the first flying bomb followed minutes later, landing in Swanscombe at 4:18. A total of 75 civilians died from enemy action within Maidstone Borough during the war as a whole.

The headquarters of No 1 Group Royal Observer Corps was situated in Maidstone until the organisation was disbanded in 1995.

== Economic history ==
The early economy of Maidstone was built around its position as a central market town to the agricultural industry of the surrounding Kent countryside. Its position on the River Medway (which was in turn fed by a series of tributaries) allowed goods to be transported in and out of the town quickly for trade. The River Len and Loose Stream provided water power to drive numerous mills that could be used for many purposes: fulling, corngrinding, papermaking etc.

The existence of trade attracted craftsmen such as Andrew Torrens and other artisans adding to a supporting manufacturing economy.

The quarrying of building stone around Maidstone has always been important and continues even today. Some of the sandstone is also used in the glass industry. The nearby chalk pits in Burham had been in use as long ago as the Roman occupation. In the 17th century the Wealden cloth industry reached as far north as the town; for here were deposits of Fuller's earth used for degreasing the wool and, perhaps more importantly, the means of transporting the finished products — the river.

In Maidstone there were many small breweries at the end of the 19th century, the river being useful for transport and water for the beer production. One of the biggest, the Style & Winch brewery, was on the river bank in the centre of the town. It shut in 1965 and the building was demolished in 1976. There were five other breweries; today only a small one — Goachers — remains. Parts of the former Fremlins brewery are now incorporated in the Fremlin Walk shopping arcade.

Paper mills, known locally as “the treacle mines”, also developed near the river. Paper was produced at places such as Turkey Mill and Hayle Mill. Notable enterprises included the Whatman family and W&R Balston beginning in the 18th century and what was to become the Reed group had several paper and cardboard milling plants in Maidstone.

== See also ==
- Grade I listed buildings in Maidstone
- List of scheduled monuments in Maidstone
