= Trouble A-Brewing =

1946 novel

- Author: John Bude
- Language: English
- Series: Detective Inspector Meredith
- Genre: Detective
- Publisher: Macdonald
- Publication date: 1946
- Publication place: United Kingdom
- Media type: Print
- Preceded by: Death in Ambush
- Followed by: Death Makes a Prophet

Trouble A-Brewing is a 1946 detective novel by the British writer John Bude. Written during the Golden Age of Detective Fiction, it is part of his series featuring Detective Inspector Meredith.

== Synopsis ==
In a town in Kent at a brewery owned by the ambitious Sir Henry Harcourt, one of the business managers is found murdered in a Hogshead of beer.

== Bibliography ==
- Hubin, Allen J. Crime Fiction, 1749-1980: A Comprehensive Bibliography. Garland Publishing, 1984.
- Reilly, John M. Twentieth Century Crime & Mystery Writers. Springer, 2015.
