= Llanelly power station =

Former power station in United Kingdom

- Country: Wales
- Location: Llanelli
- Coordinates: 51°41′33″N 04°10′15″W
- Status: Decommissioned
- Construction began: 1910
- Commission date: 1910
- Decommission date: Late 1960s
- Owners: Llanelly and District Electric Lighting and Traction Company Limited (1910–1924); Llanelly and District Electric Supply Company Limited (1924–1947); British Electricity Authority (1948–1955); Central Electricity Authority (1955–1957); Central Electricity Generating Board (1958–1970)
- Operator: As owner

Thermal power station
- Primary fuel: Coal
- Secondary fuel: Oil
- Turbine technology: Steam turbines
- Chimneys: 5
- Cooling source: Seawater

Power generation
- Units operational: 1 x 12.5 MW, 1 x 7.5 MW, 1 x 5 MW
- Make and model: British Thomson-Houston
- Units decommissioned: All
- Nameplate capacity: 24 MW
- Annual net output: 83.6 GWh (1946)

Llanelly power station, also known as North Dock power station, supplied electricity to the town of Llanelly (Llanelli since 1966) and the surrounding area from 1910 to the late 1960s. The power station was owned and operated by a succession of companies, including the Llanelly and District Electric Supply Company Limited, prior to the nationalisation of the British electricity supply industry in 1948. The power station was redeveloped in the 1920s to meet the increased demand for electricity.

== History ==
In 1891 Llanelly Corporation applied for a provisional order under the Electric Lighting Acts to generate and supply electricity to the town. The Llanelly Electric Lighting Order 1891 was granted by the Board of Trade and was confirmed by Parliament through the Electric Lighting Orders Confirmation (No. 4) Act 1891 (54 & 55 Vict. c. lii). The corporation did not construct an electricity supply system but transferred the provisional order to J. C. Howell Limited, which was established on 20 December 1905. The provisional order was subsequently transferred to the Llanelly and District Electric Lighting and Traction Company Limited when it was established in 1911. This company also supplied current for the Llanelly and District Electric Tramways from June 1911 until the tram system closed in September 1932. In 1924 the Lighting and Traction company changed its name to Llanelly and District Electric Supply Company Limited.

Llanelly power station was constructed at the north east corner of the North Dock (51°41′33″N 4°10′15″W). The location facilitated the supply of coal for the boilers, and cooling water which was drawn from the sea. Further equipment was added to meet the rising demand for electricity; by the late 1920s the station had a generating capacity of 25 MW.

== Equipment specification ==
=== Plant in 1923 ===
In 1923 the generating plant at the Llanelly power station comprised:

- Coal-fired boilers generating up to 76,000 lb/h (9.58 kg/s) of steam which was supplied to:
- Generators:
  - 1 × 500 kW reciprocating engine with DC generator
  - 1 × 750 kW steam turbo-alternator AC
  - 1 × 2,000 kW steam turbo-alternator AC
  - 1 × 3,000 kW steam turbo-alternator AC

These machines gave a total generating capacity of 6,250 kW comprising 5,750 kW of alternating current (AC) plus 500 kW of direct current (DC).

Electricity supplies to consumers were:

- 12,400 & 6,600 Volts, 3-phase, 50 Hz AC
- 500 & 250 Volts DC
- 500 V DC Traction current

=== Plant in 1923–28 ===
New plant was commissioned and installed at the Llanelly power station from 1923 to 1928. This comprised:

- Boilers:
  - 2 × 40,000 lb/h (5.04 kg/s) boiler, steam conditions 265 psi and 700 °F (18.3 bar, 371 °C)
  - 2 × 60,000 lb/h (7.5 kg/s) boilers, steam conditions as above
  - 4 × 20,000 lb/h (2.52 kg/s) boilers, steam conditions as above

The boilers were manufactured by Babcock & Wilcox and Yarrow and supplied steam to:

- Generators:
  - 1 × 5 MW British Thomson-Houston turbo-alternator, generating at 6.6 kV
  - 1 × 7.5 MW British Thomson-Houston turbo-alternator, generating at 6.6 kV
  - 1 × 12.5 MW British Thomson-Houston turbo-alternator, generating at 6.6 kV

The station was supplied with coal via a siding off the nearby dock railway line.

Condenser cooling water was drawn from the sea.

== Operations ==
The supply of electric current in the early years of operation of Llanelly power station was as follows:

Llanelly power station output
| Year | Electricity supplied MWh |
|---|---|
| 1915 | 3,479 |
| 1916 | 4,048 |
| 1917 | 4,359 |
| 1918 | 5,675 |
| 1919 | 5,826 |
| 1920 | 6,761 |

=== Operating data 1921–23 ===
The electricity supply and consumption data for the period 1921–23 was:

Llanelly power station supply and consumption data 1921–23
| Electricity use | Units | Year | | |
| Electricity use | Units | 1921 | 1922 | 1923 |
|---|---|---|---|---|
| Lighting and domestic | MWh | 480 | 773 | 715 |
| Public lighting | MWh | 175 | 157 | 178 |
| Traction | MWh | 454 | 459 | 514 |
| Power | MWh | 5,554 | 7,853 | 11,214 |
| Bulk supply | MWh | 0 | 0 | 0 |
| Total use | MWh | 6,663 | 9,243 | 12,620 |

The electricity loads on the system were:

| Year | | 1921 | 1922 | 1923 |
|---|---|---|---|---|
| Maximum load | kW | 2,655 | 3,529 | 3,780 |
| Total connections | kW | 8,000 | 9,734 | 10,670 |
| Load factor | Per cent | 18.5 | 17.8 | 17.7 |

Revenue from sales of current (in 1923) was £69,818; the surplus of revenue over expenses (1923) was £32,186.

The Corporation tramways ceased operating in September 1932.

The supply of electric current in the inter-war period was as follows:

Llanelly power station output
| Year | Electricity supplied MWh |
|---|---|
| 1921 | 7,080 |
| 1922 | 12,605 |
| 1923 | 13,761 |
| 1926 | 12,330 |
| 1927 | 18,300 |
| 1929 | 23,675 |
| 1930 | 24,546 |
| 1931 | 24,092 |
| 1932 | 24,282 |
| 1933 | 26,143 |
| 1936 | 37,952 |
| 1938 | 53,066 |

=== Operating data 1946 ===
Llanelly power station operating data for 1946 was:

| Load factor per cent | Max output load MW | Electricity supplied MWh | Thermal efficiency per cent |
|---|---|---|---|
| 39.7 | 25,777 | 83,576 | 15.15 |

The British electricity supply industry was nationalised in 1948 under the provisions of the Electricity Act 1947 (10 & 11 Geo. 6. c. 54). The Llanelly and District Electric Supply Company was dissolved, ownership of Llanelly power station was vested in the British Electricity Authority, and subsequently the Central Electricity Authority and the Central Electricity Generating Board (CEGB). At the same time the electricity distribution and sales responsibilities of the Llanelly Electric Supply Company were transferred to the South Wales Electricity Board (SWEB).

=== Operating data 1954–67 ===
Between 1964 and 1966 the boilers were converted to oil-firing. Operating data for the period 1954–67 was as follows.

Llanelly power station operating data, 1954–67
| Year | Running hours or load factor (per cent) | Max output capacity MW | Electricity supplied MWh | Thermal efficiency per cent |
|---|---|---|---|---|
| 1954 | 4548 | 24 | 59,947 | 14.11 |
| 1955 | 3315 | 24 | 39,188 | 13.83 |
| 1956 | 1992 | 24 | 22,122 | 13.69 |
| 1957 | 1564 | 24 | 18,917 | 13.91 |
| 1958 | 1151 | 24 | 13,507 | 13.75 |
| 1961 | 5.7 % | 24 | 11,933 | 13.15 |
| 1962 | 4.5 % | 24 | 9,483 | 13.01 |
| 1963 | 7.0 % | 24 | 14,722 | 13.64 |
| 1967 | 5.0 % | 24 | 10,413 | 14.39 |

Output from the station in MWh

== Llanelly supply district ==
Following nationalisation Llanelly became an electricity supply district, covering 161.1 square miles (417 km^{2}) with a population of 106,810 in 1958. The number of consumers and electricity sold in the Llanelly supply district was:

| Year | 1956 | 1957 | 1958 |
| Number of consumers | 31,685 | 32,528 | 33,171 |
| Electricity sold MWh | 337,312 | 344,323 | 342,339 |

In 1958 the number of units sold to categories of consumers was:

| Type of consumer | No. of consumers | Electricity sold MWh |
|---|---|---|
| Domestic | 28,562 | 30,472 |
| Farms | 833 | 2,397 |
| Commercial | 3,344 | 12,614 |
| Industrial | 420 | 295,439 |
| Public lighting | 12 | 1,417 |
| Total | 33,171 | 342,339 |

== Closure ==
Llanelly power station was decommissioned in the late 1960s, and was demolished in 1972.

== See also ==
- Timeline of the UK electricity supply industry
- List of power stations in Wales
- Llanelly and District Electric Tramways
