= Goachers Brewery =

Brewery in Maidstone, Kent, England

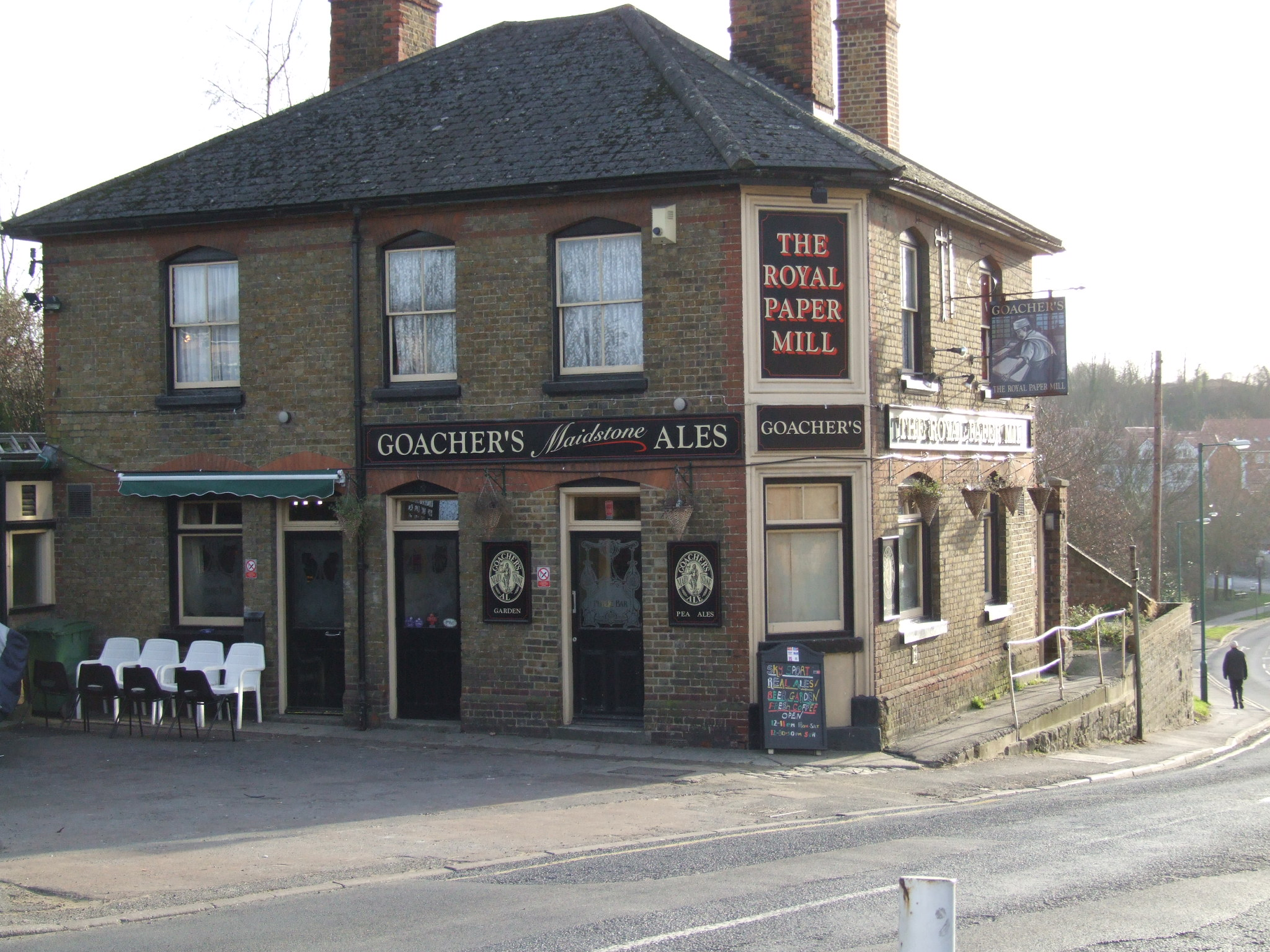
- Founded: 1983
- Products: Beer
- Website: goachers.com

Goachers Brewery is an independent brewery based in Maidstone, which supplies public houses across Kent.

Real Mild, Fine Light Ale and Crown Imperial Stout have been CAMRA beers of the year.

Goachers was founded by Phil and Debbie Goacher in 1983 close to Hayle Mill, later moving to a nearby industrial estate in 1990.

The brewery's three tied houses are The Rifle Volunteers in Maidstone; The Royal Paper Mill in Tovil, and The Little Gem in Aylesford.
