= Albert Edwin Reed =

British businessman (1846–1920)

Albert Edwin Reed (1846–1920) was the founder of Reed Elsevier, formerly Reed International, one the United Kingdom's largest professional publishing businesses. Reed was also a Wesleyan local preacher. His twin sons Albert Ralph Reed —Sir Albert Ralph Reed—and Edward Percy Reed, born in 1884, inherited A.E. Reed and Co in 1920 when their father died.

== Early life ==
Albert Edwin Reed was born on 13 January 1846 in Cullompton, Devon. He was the third of nine children of Edward Reed, an officer of the Inland Revenue, and his wife Eliza Saunders.

== Career ==
Entering the paper industry as a boy, Albert Reed bought the Trevarno Paper Mill at Bathford in 1873, receiving substantial backing from Thomas Owen (1840-1898) and Samuel Evans (c.1817-1885). They were prominent Wesleyan Methodists who operated a drapers business in Bath. In 1876, the Trevarno business was converted into a limited company (The Bath Paper Mills Co. Ltd.), in which Thomas Owen and Samuel Evans were the major shareholders while Albert Reed, his brother William and their father were more modest shareholders. Albert continued to manage the Trevarno works until 1877, when he took over management of the Ely Paper Works in Cardiff, which was owned by Evans and Owen. Having managed and/or part-owned paper businesses up to 1894, in that year he acquired a fire-damaged building, Upper Tovil Mill, near Maidstone in Kent.

He established a newsprint manufacturing company in this mill, specializing in the production of paper suitable for halftone blocks for which there was considerable demand at the time. Under his leadership the business expanded rapidly securing an order to supply newsprint for the Daily Mirror in 1904.

By 1904, Reed had five paper mills in Britain and was supplying "super calendared newsprint" that contributed to the success of the Harmsworth brothers'—Harold and Alfred Harmsworth—illustrated Daily Mirror. Reed also owned an "interest in a pulp mill on the Miramichi River in New Brunswick, Canada.

By 1905, Reed's company, A.E. Reed and Co owned "five paper mills in Britain."

In 1905, Reed began to investigate the possibility of establishing a pulp and paper mill in Bishop's Falls, Newfoundland, Canada. out of concerns about the price of woodpulp. Newfoundland's "national policy" under then Premier Robert Bond was to develop a pulp and paper industry following the construction of the railway in the late nineteenth century. Reed negotiated with Robert Gillespie Reid, director of the Canadian Pacific Railway, and the Bank of Montreal, and owner of the Reid Newfoundland Company and the Newfoundland Railway and the government of Newfoundland to obtain the rights to hydroelectric power on the Exploits River in Bishop's Falls. He also negotiated with the holder of timber rights in the Bishop's Falls area. The Bishop's Fall's mill was constructed in 1907 and the dam was completed in 1908. By 2011, ground wood pulp produced from the Bishop Fall's mill, which employed 500 men, was exported to England.

He died in 1920, leaving the management of the business to his twin sons.

== Legacy company ==
The year 1894, is considered to be the beginning of what would become the Albert E. Reed & Company Ltd. (incorporated in 1903), Reed Paper Group (1950s), Reed International (1970), Reed Paper Ltd. (Reed Inc) (1980s), Reed Elvisier (1993), and currently, RELX. By 1952, the Reed group included the Albert E. Reed and Co, Medway Corrugated Paper Co, Brookgate Industries, Reed Flong, Powell, Lane Manufacturing Co, London Paper Mills Co, Medway Paper, Sacks, National Corrugated Paper Co, Reed Paper Sales, and E. R. Freeman and Wescott. By 1953, Reed Paper Group consisted of London Paper Mills Co, Medway Corrugated Paper Co, Empire Paper Mills, Medway Paper Sacks, National Corrugated Paper Co, Brookgate Industries, Powell, Lane Manufacturing Co, E. R. Freeman and Wescott.

In the 1950s Reed Group acquired Thompson and Norris Manufacturing Co, Holoplast Ltd on Reed's Aylesford site.

Albert Edwin Reed's son, Sir (Albert) Ralph Reed (1884-1958) worked at Reed Paper Group until his retirement in 1954. With his retirement from the company, it ended the era of Reed family control.

In 1960, the Reed Paper Group's "largest shareholder" Cecil King (1901 – 1987) transferred all of the Daily Mirror Newspapers and the Sunday Pictorial Newspapers' pulp and paper mills to Reed Paper Group, thereby obtaining voting control over Reed. King named himself as chairman of Reed, and Don Ryder—one of his senior managers—as Reed's managing director. In the 1960s, King was Chairman of Daily Mirror, Sunday Pictorial, the International Publishing Corporation, and a Bank of England director.

In the 1960s Reed Group formed a joint venture partnership with Aerlan and acquired L&P Plastics, Spicers, Wall Paper Manufacturers.

In 1970, Reed Group purchased International Publishing Corporation and changed its name to Reed International. In the 1970s, as Reed International PLC, the company "reorganised its portfolio in order to concentrate on its publishing and information businesses."

In 1980, Reed Paper Ltd. was privatized and its name was changed to Reed Inc. in 1981. In 1993 it merged to become Reed Elsivier.

By 1988 the Reed Group had sold off all of its "manufacturing operations".

In 1993, Reed International PLC and Elsevier NV merged to form Reed Elsevier. Reed Elsevier operates the Reed Elsevier Group plc—its publishing and information businesses, and Elsevier Reed Finance BV—the financing arm.

The company once known as Reed Elsevier, now known as RELX is a London, United Kingdom-headquartered-multinational corporation, that includes businesses that provide scientific, legal, technical, and medical information and analytics among other services and has operations in 40 countries. RELX employed about 33,000 in 2019.

== Personal life ==
Reed, who was born in Devonshire, Cullompton married Emma, who was born in Somerset, Langford. They lived at Devonshire House on Pelham Road. They had three daughters —Rosaline Emma (b.1877), Florence Beatrice (b.1879), and Dora Gertrude (b.1883), and twin sons Albert Ralph and Edward Percy born in 1885.

Reed died in Woking in 1920.

== Other interests ==
Reed was a Wesleyan local preacher, a staunch Methodist, and a philanthropist.
