= The Cheltenham Square Murder =

1937 novel

- Author: John Bude
- Language: English
- Series: Superintendent Meredith
- Genre: Detective
- Publisher: Skeffington & Son
- Publication date: 1937
- Publication place: United Kingdom
- Media type: Print
- Preceded by: The Sussex Downs Murder
- Followed by: Death in Ambush

The Cheltenham Square Murder is a 1937 detective novel by the British writer John Bude. It is the third in his series of novels featuring Superintendent Meredith. It features a closed circle of suspects as was popular in the genre of the decade as well as elements of police procedural in the style of the Inspector French novels. in 2016, it was reissued by the British Library Publishing as part of a group of republished crime novels from the Golden Age of Detective Fiction.

== Synopsis ==
In the genteel Regency Square in the spa town of Cheltenham, one of the residents is shot dead with an arrow in the back of his head. Meredith who is staying with his friend, the crime novelist Aldous Barnet, is called to the scene. He gains permission from his superiors at the Sussex Constabulary to stay and work with the local force to sole the case. The dead man was a caddish figure with several potential enemies amongst his neighbours. Intriguingly several residents of the square are also members of an archery club.

Further strands come together when a sheep is found dead in nearby Winchcombe with an arrow protruding from its body and a raid on an illegal gambling club in the suburb of Charlton Kings throws fresh light on one of the principal suspects. When an identical murder to the first takes place, an arrow flying through an open window to hit the occupant in the very same chair, the police begin to wonder if the first killing had been a case of mistaken identity.

== Bibliography ==
- Hubin, Allen J. Crime Fiction, 1749-1980: A Comprehensive Bibliography. Garland Publishing, 1984.
- Reilly, John M. Twentieth Century Crime & Mystery Writers. Springer, 2015.
