= Listed buildings in Tovil =

Civil Parish in Kent, England

Tovil is a village and civil parish in the Borough of Maidstone of Kent, England It contains three grade II* and 15 grade listed buildings that are recorded in the National Heritage List for England.

This list is based on the information retrieved online from Historic England.

== Key ==
Grade	Criteria
I	Buildings that are of exceptional interest
II*	Particularly important buildings of more than special interest
II	Buildings that are of special interest

== Listing ==
Name	Grade	Location	Type	Completed (Note: The date given is the date used by Historic England as significant for the initial building or that of an important part in the structure's description.)	Date designated	Grid ref. (Note: The grid reference is based on the British national grid reference system, sometimes known as OSGB36, used by the Ordnance Survey.) Geo-coordinates	Notes	Entry number (Note: The "List Entry Number" is a unique number assigned to each listed building and scheduled monument by Historic England.)	Image	Wikidata
Crisbrook House	II	Cave Hill			2 August 1974	TQ7560254193; 51°15′35″N 0°30′55″E		1086360	Upload Photo	Q26376892
Upper Crisbrook Mill	II	Cave Hill			2 August 1974	TQ7565754069; 51°15′31″N 0°30′58″E		1336182	Upload Photo	Q26620699
Grasmere	II	15, Church Road			2 August 1974	TQ7544454643; 51°15′50″N 0°30′48″E		1086364	Upload Photo	Q26376902
Hayle Place	II	Cripple Street			30 July 1951	TQ7582753814; 51°15′23″N 0°31′06″E		1273759	Upload Photo	Q26563476
Hayle Mill	II*	Hayle Mill Road	mill		2 August 1974	TQ7559553870; 51°15′25″N 0°30′54″E		1267535	Hayle Mill More images	Q17545329
Bockingford Steps	II	Lower Tovil			30 July 1951	TQ7567753609; 51°15′16″N 0°30′58″E		1336229	Upload Photo	Q26620745
Great Ivy Mill	II	Lower Tovil			2 August 1974	TQ7567453118; 51°15′01″N 0°30′57″E		1086296	Upload Photo	Q26376595
Ivy Mill Cottage	II	1-4, Lower Tovil			21 March 1973	TQ7561753294; 51°15′06″N 0°30′54″E		1086295	Upload Photo	Q26376590
Ivy Mill House	II	Lower Tovil			2 August 1974	TQ7563153222; 51°15′04″N 0°30′55″E		1336228	Upload Photo	Q26620744
Abbey Gate Farmhouse	II*	Stockett Lane			30 July 1951	TQ7526053653; 51°15′18″N 0°30′37″E		1086289	Upload Photo	Q17545125
Water Tank in Grounds of Abbey Gate Place	II	Stockett Lane			2 August 1974	TQ7523853653; 51°15′18″N 0°30′36″E		1336224	Upload Photo	Q26620741
Bydews Farmhouse	II	Tovil Green			2 August 1974	TQ7485654360; 51°15′42″N 0°30′17″E		1225497	Upload Photo	Q26519587
Bydews Place	II*	Tovil Green			30 July 1951	TQ7484154296; 51°15′40″N 0°30′16″E		1075786	Upload Photo	Q17545097
Cottage to North West of Bydews Place	II	Tovil Green			2 August 1974	TQ7484154316; 51°15′40″N 0°30′16″E		1086251	Upload Photo	Q26376397
Dovecote in the Grounds of Bydews Place	II	Tovil Green			2 August 1974	TQ7487054333; 51°15′41″N 0°30′18″E		1336246	Upload Photo	Q26620759
Oasthouse at Bydews Farm to the South West of the Former Granary	II	Tovil Green			2 August 1974	TQ7479154299; 51°15′40″N 0°30′14″E		1225499	Upload Photo	Q26519589
Old Cottages	II	1-4, Tovil Green			2 August 1974	TQ7505354634; 51°15′50″N 0°30′28″E		1086250	Upload Photo	Q26376391
Drinking Fountain	II	Tovil Hill			2 August 1974	TQ7544954583; 51°15′48″N 0°30′48″E		1266334	Upload Photo	Q26556831

== See also ==
- Grade I listed buildings in Kent
- Grade II* listed buildings in Kent

== Sources ==
- Newman, John (2012) [1969], Kent: West and the Weald, The Buildings of England, New Haven and London: Yale University Press, ISBN 978-0-300-18509-6
