= Death Makes a Prophet =

1947 novel

- Author: John Bude
- Language: English
- Series: Detective Inspector Meredith
- Genre: Detective
- Publisher: Macdonald
- Publication date: 1947
- Publication place: United Kingdom
- Media type: Print
- Preceded by: Trouble A-Brewing
- Followed by: Dangerous Sunlight

Death Makes a Prophet is a 1947 detective novel by the British author John Bude, the pseudonym of Ernest Elmore. In 2017 it was reissued by the British Library Publishing as part of a group of republished crime novels from the Golden Age of Detective Fiction.

== Synopsis ==
In Welworth Garden City in Hertfordshire a growing cult has gathered members, but a power dispute has broken out between the founder and a charismatic newcomer. During a summer rally at the country estate of one of its wealthiest and most prominent members, a double murder takes place with the High Prophet of the movement amongst the dead.

== Bibliography ==
- Hubin, Allen J. Crime Fiction, 1749-1980: A Comprehensive Bibliography. Garland Publishing, 1984.
- Reilly, John M. Twentieth Century Crime & Mystery Writers. Springer, 2015.
