= Death on the Riviera =

1952 novel

- First edition image
- Author: John Bude
- Language: English
- Series: Superintendent Meredith
- Genre: Detective
- Publisher: Macdonald
- Publication date: 1952
- Publication place: United Kingdom
- Media type: Print
- Preceded by: When the Case Was Opened
- Followed by: Twice Dead

Death on the Riviera is a 1952 detective novel by the British writer John Bude. It was part of a series featuring Superintendent Meredith of Scotland Yard. While Bude set many of his earlier novels in regional England, after the Second World War they made increasing use of more exotic, Continental settings. In 2016 it was reissued by the British Library Publishing as part of a group of republished crime novels from the Golden Age of Detective Fiction. The character of Inspector Blampignon of the Sûreté returned in the 1956 novel A Telegram from Le Touquet.

== Synopsis ==
On the trail of a gang of counterfeiters headed by London criminal Chalky Cabot, Meredith heads down to the French Riviera after a tip-off from the local police. Joining forces with a local Inspector, they investigate along the coastline until their attention is drawn to the Villa Paloma owned by an eccentrical Englishwoman. Matters are complicated further when a dead body is discovered.

== Bibliography ==
- Hubin, Allen J. Crime Fiction, 1749-1980: A Comprehensive Bibliography. Garland Publishing, 1984.
- Reilly, John M. Twentieth Century Crime & Mystery Writers. Springer, 2015.
