= Death in White Pyjamas =

1944 novel

- First Edition (UK)
- Author: John Bude
- Language: English
- Genre: Detective
- Publisher: Cassell
- Publication date: 1944
- Publication place: United Kingdom
- Media type: Print

Death in White Pyjamas is a 1944 detective novel by the British writer John Bude. It is a stand-alone novel and does not feature his regular character Superintendent Meredith. Although written during the Second World War, no reference is made to the ongoing conflict. Originally published by Cassell, in 2020 it was reissued by the British Library Publishing in a single edition with another Bude novel Death Knows No Calendar, as part of a series of republished crime novels from the Golden Age of Detective Fiction.

== Synopsis ==
The leading actors of the Beaumont Theatre gather at the Sussex country estate of their financial backer, Sam Richardson, a biscuit millionaire for some relaxation before they begin Rehearsals for the new theatrical season. The guests include the womanising but successful impresario Basil Barnes, the attractive but malicious set designer Deidre Lehaye, drunken character actor Willy Farnham, ingénue Angela Walsh and the nephew of one of the actresses, Rudolph Millar, an aspiring playwright who hopes to have his work produced by the company.

Things take a downward turn when some money is discovered to be missing. Theft is followed by blackmail and attempted seduction. Events come to a head when the corpse of Lehaye is found one night in the lake wearing white silk pyjamas. Inspector Harting of the local police takes over the investigation and discovers that several of her associates had both the motive and the opportunity to murder the scheming Lehaye.

== Bibliography ==
- Hubin, Allen J. Crime Fiction, 1749-1980: A Comprehensive Bibliography. Garland Publishing, 1984.
- Reilly, John M. Twentieth Century Crime & Mystery Writers. Springer, 2015.
