= Death Knows No Calendar =

1942 novel

- First edition
- Author: John Bude
- Language: English
- Genre: Detective
- Publisher: Cassell
- Publication date: 1942
- Publication place: United Kingdom
- Media type: Print

Death Knows No Calendar is a 1942 detective novel by the British writer John Bude. It was a stand-alone novel rather than one featuring his regular detective Superintendent Meredith. In this case the investigation is led by a former army officer Major Boddy. It takes the former of a locked room mystery with a closed circle of suspects, both popular variations of the genre during the period. Originally published by Cassell, in 2020 it was reissued by the British Library Publishing in a single edition with another Bude novel Death in White Pyjamas, as part of a series of republished crime novels from the Golden Age of Detective Fiction.

Reviewing the novel for the Times Literary Supplement, Maurice Willson Disher wrote "There was a time when a mystery of crime detection could be casually introduced into novels as an episode. Unfortunately for Mr. Bude readers nowadays feel disappointed if a detective story does not run true to form. When the identity of his murderer ceases to be a mystery about half way through, we may feel, no doubt unfairly, that the author has simply been unable to keep it up." and concluded "Any strain upon the intellect slackens page by page".

== Synopsis ==
Wealthy painter Lydia Arundel continuously flirts with the attentions of the men in the small Sussex village in which she lives. Making her potential enemies amongst a number of inhabitants, including the guilt-ridden rector who fails to get over a brief dalliance with her and a young woman who believes her fiancee is carrying on with her. When Lydia is found shot through the head in her locked studio the inquest deems it to be suicide. However retired army officer and detective fiction enthusiast Major Boddy takes up the case, with the assistance of his servant and former orderly Private Gammon.

After considerable investigation, Boddy at last believes he has cracked the way the murderer has killed in the seemingly locked room. However he still has several potential candidates for murder, including Lydia's husband a failed actor who has inherited all of her money. Body's sleuthing now takes him further afield to East London and Gloucestershire as he searches for the explanation of the killing.

== Bibliography ==
- Hubin, Allen J. Crime Fiction, 1749-1980: A Comprehensive Bibliography. Garland Publishing, 1984.
- Reilly, John M. Twentieth Century Crime & Mystery Writers. Springer, 2015.
