= Ernest Elmore =

British writer

- Born: 4 November 1901 Maidstone, Kent, England
- Died: 8 November 1957 (aged 56) Hastings, Sussex
- Occupation: novelist, actor
- Genre: Crime fiction Fantasy
- Spouse: Muriel Betty Sharp (1933–57; his death)
- Children: Jennifer; Richard

Ernest Carpenter Elmore (4 November 1901 – 8 November 1957) was an English theatre producer and director, and writer of crime and fantasy novels. He wrote his crime novels under the pseudonym John Bude.

== Life ==
Elmore was born in Maidstone, Kent in 1901. He attended Mill Hill School until 1919 as a boarder, and then studied at a secretarial college in Cheltenham, before becoming a games master at St Christopher School, Letchworth. While there he also assisted with the school's dramatic activities. His interest in dramatics led him to join the Lena Ashwell Players as stage manager, touring the country with the company. Much of Elmore's early writing took place in dressing rooms during his spare time.

In 1931 he is known to have been living in the village of Loose, Kent, before returning to Maidstone, where he produced plays for the local dramatic society. There he also met his future wife Betty. They married in Maidstone in 1933 and moved to Beckley, Sussex, where he became a full-time writer. Together Elmore and his wife had a daughter, Jennifer, and a son, Richard.

In December 2015, Elmore's photo appeared in The Times of London, along with a lengthy article detailing the success of reprints of his books.

== Writings ==
Elmore published 30 crime novels under the pseudonym John Bude, with Inspector William Meredith appearing in most of them. The first two were The Lake District Murder and The Cornish Coast Murder, published in 1935, followed the next year by The Sussex Downs Murder. These three have since been reprinted by the British Library. Elmore was a founding member of the Norfolk-based Crime Writers' Association in 1953.

Straddling the crime novels were several works of humorous fantasy written under his own name, the most well-known being The Steel Grubs (1928), This Siren Song (1930), and The Lumpton Gobbelings (1954). He wrote seven books in his own name, including the children's book Snuffly Snorty Dog (1946).

Later British crime author Martin Edwards commented: "Bude writes both readably and entertainingly. His work may not have been stunning enough to belong with the greats, but there is a smoothness and accomplishment about even his first mystery, The Cornish Coast Murder, which you don't find in many début mysteries."

== List of publications ==
Writing as John Bude
- The Cornish Coast Murder (1935)
- The Lake District Murder (1935)
- The Sussex Downs Murder (1936)
- The Cheltenham Square Murder (1937)
- Loss of a Head (1938)
- Hand on Alibi (1939)
- Death on Paper (1940)
- Death of a Cad (1940)
- Slow Vengeance (1941)
- Death Knows No Calendar (1942)
- Death Deals a Double (1943)
- Death in White Pyjamas (1944)
- Death in Ambush (1945)
- Trouble A-Brewing (1946)
- Death Makes a Prophet (1947)
- Dangerous Sunlight (1948)
- Murder in Montparnasse (1949) – non-series thriller
- A Glut of Red Herrings (1949)
- Death Steals the Show (1950)
- The Constable and the Lady (1951)
- When the Case Was Opened (1952)
- Death on the Riviera (1952)
- Twice Dead (1953)
- So Much in the Dark (1954)
- Two Ends to the Town (1955)
- A Shift of Guilt (1956)
- A Telegram from Le Touquet (1956)
- Another Man's Shadow (1957)
- A Twist of the Rope (1958)
- The Night the Fog Came Down (1958)

Writing as Ernest Elmore

Books for adults

- The Steel Grubs (1928)
- This Siren Song (1930)
- The Baboon and The Fiddle (1932)
- Green in Judgement (1939)
- Christmas at Gillybrook (1949)
- The Lumpton Gobbelings (1954)

Books for children

- Snuffly Snorty Dog (1946)

== Adaptations ==
Audio book versions of The Lake District Murder, The South Downs Murder (originally The Sussex Downs Murder, 1936), and The Cornish Coast Murder were produced by Soundings Audio Books and narrated by Gordon Griffin.
