= The Lake District Murder =

1935 novel

- Author: John Bude
- Language: English
- Series: Superintendent Meredith
- Genre: Detective
- Publisher: Skeffington & Son
- Publication date: 1935
- Publication place: United Kingdom
- Media type: Print
- Followed by: The Sussex Downs Murder

The Lake District Murder is a 1935 detective novel by the British writer John Bude. It is the first in a series of novels featuring Chief Inspector Meredith, promoted at the end of case to Superintendent. Set in the Lake District of Northern England, it shows the influence of Freeman Wills Crofts's Inspector French novels by featuring a detective who methodically breaks down the alibis of his suspects. In 2014 it was reissued by the British Library Publishing as part of a group of republished crime novels from the Golden Age of Detective Fiction.

== Synopsis ==
The body of a man is found at the lonely filling station in Cumbria where he is a partner, asphyxiated by car exhaust fumes. It is at first taken to be suicide until several discrepancies prompt the police to take a closer look. Meredith and his colleagues begin to suspect that the dead man has been silenced by his associates in some elaborate criminal scheme using a series of petrol deliveries as a front. Only by uncovering this can they hope to solve the murder case.

== Bibliography ==
- Hubin, Allen J. Crime Fiction, 1749-1980: A Comprehensive Bibliography. Garland Publishing, 1984.
- Reilly, John M. Twentieth Century Crime & Mystery Writers. Springer, 2015.
