= Death Steals the Show =

1950 novel

- Author: John Bude
- Language: English
- Series: Superintendent Meredith
- Genre: Detective
- Publisher: Macdonald
- Publication date: 1950
- Publication place: United Kingdom
- Media type: Print
- Preceded by: Dangerous Sunlight
- Followed by: The Constable and the Lady

Death Steals the Show is a 1950 detective novel by the British writer John Bude. It is part of his series of novels featuring Superintendent Meredith.

== Synopsis ==
A new musical Old Seville produced by Kurt Goldmayer is having a try-out at a South Coast theatre before transferring to London's West End. One night, however, the leading lady Adrienne Daw disappears from her dressing room and is later found murdered.

== Bibliography ==
- Hubin, Allen J. Crime Fiction, 1749-1980: A Comprehensive Bibliography. Garland Publishing, 1984.
- Reilly, John M. Twentieth Century Crime & Mystery Writers. Springer, 2015.
- Sarver, Linda & Markus, Tom. A Novel Approach to Theatre: From Adams to Zola. Scarecrow Press, 1997.
