= Listed buildings in Loose, Kent =

Historic structures in Kent, England

Loose is a village and civil parish in the Borough of Maidstone of Kent, England It contains two grade II* and 54 grade II listed buildings that are recorded in the National Heritage List for England.

This list is based on the information retrieved online from Historic England.

== Key ==
Grade	Criteria
I	Buildings that are of exceptional interest
II*	Particularly important buildings of more than special interest
II	Buildings that are of special interest

== Listing ==
Name	Grade	Location	Type	Completed (Note: The date given is the date used by Historic England as significant for the initial building or that of an important part in the structure's description.)	Date designated	Grid ref. (Note: The grid reference is based on the British national grid reference system, sometimes known as OSGB36, used by the Ordnance Survey.) Geo-coordinates	Notes	Entry number (Note: The "List Entry Number" is a unique number assigned to each listed building and scheduled monument by Historic England.)	Image	Wikidata
Randalls Row	II				26 February 1987	TQ7561652105; 51°14′28″N 0°30′52″E		1250486	Upload Photo	Q26542530
Barn About 43 Metres East of Pimps Court	II	Bridge Street			26 February 1987	TQ7540652756; 51°14′49″N 0°30′43″E		1250381	Upload Photo	Q26542431
Ruins About 6 Metres West South West of Pimps Court	II	Bridge Street			26 February 1987	TQ7532952732; 51°14′49″N 0°30′39″E		1250378	Upload Photo	Q26542428
Church House	II	Church Street			23 May 1967	TQ7571552048; 51°14′26″N 0°30′57″E		1263251	Upload Photo	Q26554052
Church of All Saints	II*	Church Street			23 May 1967	TQ7571752083; 51°14′27″N 0°30′57″E		1263275	Church of All Saints More images	Q17545304
Florence House and Florence Cottage	II	Church Street			23 May 1967	TQ7568452140; 51°14′29″N 0°30′56″E		1250465	Upload Photo	Q26542511
Loose War Memorial	II	Church Street, ME15 0BT			13 July 2016	TQ7576852012; 51°14′25″N 0°31′00″E		1436297	Upload Photo	Q26678145
Monument About 0.5 Metre South of South Cancel Chapel of Church of All Saints	II	Church Street			26 February 1987	TQ7572652070; 51°14′27″N 0°30′58″E		1250460	Upload Photo	Q26542506
Monument to Ann Jones About 1 Metre South of South Chancel Chapel of Church of All Saints	II	Church Street			26 February 1987	TQ7572552069; 51°14′27″N 0°30′58″E		1263247	Upload Photo	Q26554048
Monument to Charlton Family About 0.5 Metres South of Tower of Church of All Saints	II	Church Street			26 February 1987	TQ7570552073; 51°14′27″N 0°30′57″E		1250454	Upload Photo	Q26542499
Monument to Elizabeth Boorman About 10 Metres South of South Chancel Chapel of Church of All Saints	II	Church Street			26 February 1987	TQ7572152064; 51°14′26″N 0°30′58″E		1250449	Upload Photo	Q26542494
Monument to Joseph Charlton About 9 Metres South of South Porch of Church of All Sanits	II	Church Street			26 February 1987	TQ7571552060; 51°14′26″N 0°30′57″E		1250452	Upload Photo	Q26542497
Monument to Sarah Crispe About One Metre South of South Aisle of Church of All Saints	II	Church Street			26 February 1987	TQ7570952070; 51°14′27″N 0°30′57″E		1250455	Upload Photo	Q26542500
Monument to Thomas Fisher About 1 Metre East of South Chancel Chapel of Church of All Saints	II	Church Street			26 February 1987	TQ7572752074; 51°14′27″N 0°30′58″E		1250456	Upload Photo	Q26542501
Monument to Thomas Jones About One Metre South East of South Chancel Chapel of Church of All Saints	II	Church Street			26 February 1987	TQ7572852070; 51°14′27″N 0°30′58″E		1263248	Upload Photo	Q26554049
Monument to Walter Jones About 0.5 Metre South of South Chancel Chapel of Church of All Saints	II	Church Street			26 February 1987	TQ7572652071; 51°14′27″N 0°30′58″E		1250459	Upload Photo	Q26542505
The Old Vicarage	II	Church Street			26 February 1987	TQ7568752104; 51°14′28″N 0°30′56″E		1250400	Upload Photo	Q26542450
Bockingford Farmhouse	II	Cripple Street			2 August 1974	TQ7609453617; 51°15′16″N 0°31′20″E		1086367	Upload Photo	Q26376919
Bockingford House	II	Cripple Street			2 August 1974	TQ7592753601; 51°15′16″N 0°31′11″E		1273756	Upload Photo	Q26563473
Little Bockingford	II	Cripple Street			2 August 1974	TQ7592753611; 51°15′16″N 0°31′11″E		1336183	Upload Photo	Q26620700
Former Oasthouse About 20 Metres South South East of the Wool House and Wool House Cottage	II	High Banks			25 June 1967	TQ7559952057; 51°14′26″N 0°30′51″E		1250658	Upload Photo	Q26542692
The Wool House and Garden Wall to North and East	II*	High Banks			25 July 1952	TQ7558552090; 51°14′27″N 0°30′51″E		1263154	The Wool House and Garden Wall to North and East More images	Q17545300
The Dairy House	II	Kirkdale			26 February 1987	TQ7570452187; 51°14′30″N 0°30′57″E		1250499	Upload Photo	Q26542543
Tylers	II	Kirkdale			7 June 1978	TQ7572752156; 51°14′29″N 0°30′58″E		1250495	Upload Photo	Q26542539
Former Coxheath Congregational Church	II	Linton Road, ME15 0AL			26 February 1987	TQ7566651154; 51°13′57″N 0°30′53″E		1263237	Upload Photo	Q26554041
Loose Viaduct	II	Linton Road			23 May 1967	TQ7593852074; 51°14′27″N 0°31′09″E		1263170	Upload Photo	Q26553977
Hawthorne Cottage	II	592, Loose Road			26 February 1987	TQ7609352444; 51°14′38″N 0°31′17″E		1250520	Upload Photo	Q26542564
Hill House	II	673, Loose Road			23 May 1967	TQ7614452414; 51°14′37″N 0°31′20″E		1250519	Upload Photo	Q26542563
Osborne House	II	351, Loose Road			2 August 1974	TQ7666653758; 51°15′20″N 0°31′49″E		1336204	Upload Photo	Q26620721
Shernold House	II	Loose Road			30 July 1951	TQ7641453115; 51°15′00″N 0°31′35″E		1224648	Upload Photo	Q26518813
Woodlawn	II	Loose Valley			23 May 1967	TQ7553952698; 51°14′47″N 0°30′49″E		1250524	Upload Photo	Q26542567
Westbrook	II	1 and 2, Millstreet			26 February 1987	TQ7565752143; 51°14′29″N 0°30′54″E		1250527	Upload Photo	Q26542570
1-3, Old Loose Hill	II	1-3, Old Loose Hill, ME15 0BH			23 May 1967	TQ7584252182; 51°14′30″N 0°31′04″E		1250598	Upload Photo	Q26542639
Barn About 11 Metres North North West of Brook House	II	Old Loose Hill			26 February 1987	TQ7580052075; 51°14′27″N 0°31′02″E		1250594	Upload Photo	Q26542635
Brook House	II	Old Loose Hill			25 July 1952	TQ7580952052; 51°14′26″N 0°31′02″E		1250577	Upload Photo	Q26542618
Highbanks Cottage	II	Old Loose Hill			24 March 1981	TQ7575951937; 51°14′22″N 0°30′59″E		1250569	Upload Photo	Q26542610
Olde Hill House	II	Old Loose Hill			26 February 1987	TQ7578751925; 51°14′22″N 0°31′01″E		1250549	Upload Photo	Q26542590
The Chequers Inn	II	Old Loose Hill			25 July 1952	TQ7583552077; 51°14′27″N 0°31′03″E		1250596	Upload Photo	Q26542637
The Limes	II	Old Loose Hill			23 May 1967	TQ7588252196; 51°14′31″N 0°31′06″E		1250560	Upload Photo	Q26542601
Vale House	II	Old Loose Hill			25 July 1952	TQ7589552120; 51°14′28″N 0°31′07″E		1250555	Upload Photo	Q26542596
Slade House, Including Attached Boundary Wall, Gatepiers, Gates and Railings	II	Pickering Street			6 March 2009	TQ7649552421; 51°14′37″N 0°31′38″E		1393175	Upload Photo	Q26672358
Peartree Cottage	II	1 and 2, Pickering Street			23 May 1967	TQ7654552484; 51°14′39″N 0°31′41″E		1263168	Upload Photo	Q26553975
Barn About 12 Metres West of Salts Place	II	Salts Lane			26 February 1987	TQ7606951819; 51°14′18″N 0°31′15″E		1250636	Upload Photo	Q26542674
Barn About 40 Metres North of Filmers Farmhouse	II	Salts Lane			26 February 1987	TQ7622951673; 51°14′13″N 0°31′23″E		1250630	Upload Photo	Q26542669
Filmers Farmhouse	II	Salts Lane			26 February 1987	TQ7622251627; 51°14′12″N 0°31′23″E		1250629	Upload Photo	Q26542668
Old Mill House	II	Salts Lane			23 May 1967	TQ7600552088; 51°14′27″N 0°31′12″E		1250612	Upload Photo	Q26542653
Salts Farm Cottages	II	1 2 and 3, Salts Lane			26 February 1987	TQ7609351618; 51°14′12″N 0°31′16″E		1250631	Upload Photo	Q26542670
Salts Place	II	Salts Lane			25 July 1952	TQ7609551816; 51°14′18″N 0°31′16″E		1250632	Upload Photo	Q26542671
Cemetery Chapel	II	Sutton Road			2 August 1974	TQ7689753629; 51°15′16″N 0°32′01″E		1086290	Upload Photo	Q26376569
Municipal Cemetery Lodge	II	Sutton Road			2 August 1974	TQ7683753768; 51°15′20″N 0°31′58″E		1225443	Upload Photo	Q26519539
Hope Cottages	II	1-4, Walnut Tree Lane			17 December 1974	TQ7618252418; 51°14′37″N 0°31′22″E		1250651	Upload Photo	Q26542685
Inwood	II	Well Street			23 February 1983	TQ7530451641; 51°14′13″N 0°30′35″E		1250684	Upload Photo	Q26542718
Palm Cottage	II	Well Street			23 May 1967	TQ7543451936; 51°14′23″N 0°30′43″E		1250679	Upload Photo	Q26542713
Spring Cottage Stone Cottage	II	Well Street			26 February 1987	TQ7543551953; 51°14′23″N 0°30′43″E		1263160	Upload Photo	Q26553967
The Old Cottage	II	Well Street			26 February 1987	TQ7519951578; 51°14′11″N 0°30′30″E		1250686	Upload Photo	Q26542720
Tudor Cottage and Snark Cottage	II	Well Street			26 February 1987	TQ7544351962; 51°14′23″N 0°30′43″E		1250663	Upload Photo	Q26542697

== See also ==
- Grade I listed buildings in Kent
- Grade II* listed buildings in Kent

== Sources ==
- Newman, John (2012) [1969], Kent: West and the Weald, The Buildings of England, New Haven and London: Yale University Press, ISBN 978-0-300-18509-6
