= The Sussex Downs Murder =

1936 novel

- First edition
- Author: John Bude
- Language: English
- Series: Superintendent Meredith
- Genre: Detective
- Publisher: Skeffington & Son
- Publication date: 1936
- Publication place: United Kingdom
- Media type: Print
- Preceded by: The Lake District Murder
- Followed by: The Cheltenham Square Murder

The Sussex Downs Murder is a 1936 detective novel by the British writer John Bude. It is the second novel in a series featuring Superintendent Meredith. He has transferred from the Lake District to the Sussex Constabulary based in Lewes between the novels. Much of the novel takes place around the Chanctonbury Ring. In 2014 it was reissued by the British Library Publishing as part of a group of republished crime novels from the Golden Age of Detective Fiction.

== Synopsis ==
Shortly after leaving for a holiday in Wales, John Rother's car and bloodied hat are discovered on a road a few miles away from the South Downs farmhouse where he lives. Suspicion immediately falls on his brother William and his wife, who stand to benefit financially from his death. This seems even more to be the case when bones begin turning up in limestone deliveries originating from the kiln close to the Rother farmhouse. Only a few odd threads seem to prevent Meredith from tying up the case, such as a figure seen in a cloak hurrying away from the scene of the supposed murder. When William is found dead having tumbled off a cliff, the suicide note he leaves behind appears to be a clear confession of his murder. However Meredith is drawn on by the nagging suspicion there is still more to the case than meets the eye.

== Bibliography ==
- Hubin, Allen J. Crime Fiction, 1749-1980: A Comprehensive Bibliography. Garland Publishing, 1984.
- Reilly, John M. Twentieth Century Crime & Mystery Writers. Springer, 2015.
