= When the Case Was Opened =

1952 novel

- First edition
- Author: John Bude
- Language: English
- Series: Detective Inspector Meredith
- Genre: Detective
- Publisher: Macdonald
- Publication date: 1952
- Publication place: United Kingdom
- Media type: Print
- Preceded by: The Constable and the Lady
- Followed by: Death on the Riviera

When the Case Was Opened is a 1952 mystery detective novel by the British writer John Bude. It is the ninth featuring his series character Chief Inspector Meredith of Scotland Yard, one of the numerous detectives featuring in the Golden Age of Detective Fiction.

== Synopsis ==
Meredith is called in to investigate a murder at a food processing plant in Kent. The victim appears to have been killed in a river seventy miles away and brought to the spot, while a rival firm has managed to get hold of the plans for a new product.

== Bibliography ==
- Hubin, Allen J. Crime Fiction, 1749-1980: A Comprehensive Bibliography. Garland Publishing, 1984.
- Reilly, John M. Twentieth Century Crime & Mystery Writers. Springer, 2015.
