= Twice Dead =

1953 novel

- First edition
- Author: John Bude
- Language: English
- Series: Superintendent Meredith
- Genre: Detective
- Publisher: Macdonald
- Publication date: 1953
- Publication place: United Kingdom
- Media type: Print
- Preceded by: Death on the Riviera
- Followed by: So Much in the Dark

Twice Dead is a 1953 mystery detective novel by the British writer John Bude. It is part of his series featuring the Superintendent Meredith of Scotland Yard, one of the numerous detectives featuring in the Golden Age of Detective Fiction.

== Synopsis ==
Meredith is called in to investigate after a young female artist disappears from a former coastguard cottage on the Sussex seafront. He begins to suspect that the answer to the case might be in Paris where she was an art student.

== Bibliography ==
- Hubin, Allen J. Crime Fiction, 1749-1980: A Comprehensive Bibliography. Garland Publishing, 1984.
- Reilly, John M. Twentieth Century Crime & Mystery Writers. Springer, 2015.
