= Loose, Kent =

Village in Kent, England

Coordinates: 51.2408°N 0.5164°E

Loose
- Location within Kent
- Population: 2,277 (2011 census, including Boughton Green)
- OS grid reference: TQ758519
  - London: 34 miles (55 km) NW
- District: Maidstone
- Shire county: Kent
- Region: South East
- Country: England
- Sovereign state: United Kingdom
- Post town: MAIDSTONE
- Postcode district: ME15
- Dialling code: 01622
- Police: Kent
- Fire: Kent
- Ambulance: South East Coast
- UK Parliament: Maidstone and Malling (north); Weald of Kent (south)

Loose /ˈluːz/ is a village and civil parish some 2 miles (3 km) south of Maidstone, Kent, situated at the head of the Loose Valley, with which it forms the Loose Valley Conservation Area. The fast-flowing River Loose which rises near Langley runs through the centre of the village and once supported a paper-making industry, evidence of which can still be found. An area round the village is also known as Loose, but Loose village itself is based in the Loose valley and extends along Busbridge Road towards Tovil. The name is believed to be taken from the Loose Stream, which "loses" itself for several miles underground from the point where it rises in Langley (Edward Hasted: Hlosan in Saxon, signifying to lose or be lost).

== History ==
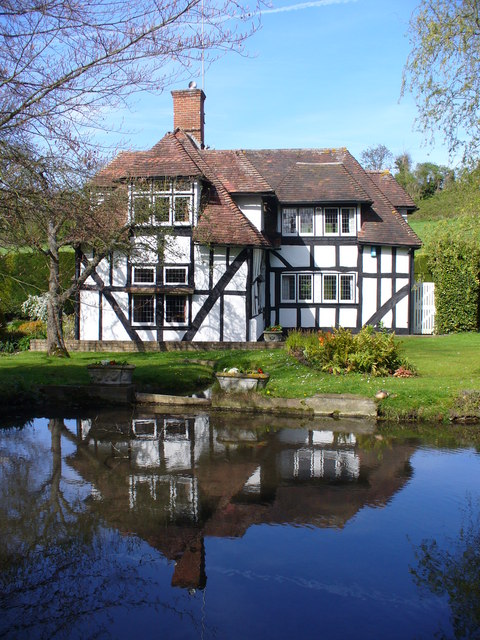
Cottage outside Loose stream

Loose originated in Saxon times, but its main period of growth was during the Industrial Revolution, when Loose, Boughton Monchelsea and Bockingford developed around the seven mills powered by the Loose Stream. There are several remains of the mills, including millraces at Leg O'Mutton Pond, Gurney's Mill, Loose Village Mill in Bridge Street, the mill ponds at Little and Great Ivy mills, and further down the valley in Crismill and Hayle, where the old paper mill stands with one remaining chimney. This site has now been redeveloped as housing. Further south are disused quarries where Kentish ragstone was once quarried, some being sent for use at the Tower of London. South along the Loose Road (A229), terminating at the post office, ran a tram way to and from Maidstone and Barming, the trams were replaced by trolley buses on the Loose route in 1930, they were in turn replaced by motor buses in 1967.

Loose Hill descends into Loose village and the valley, the hill being so steep that in the 18th and 19th centuries the owner of the "Change", half way up the hill, kept horses that were hired out to provide assistance in hauling carts to the top. The road is still lined with haul stones around which ropes were tied to help relieve the horses from the weight of the carts. Across the stream from The Chequers is Brooks Field.

The more gentle hill on the opposite side of the valley leafs back towards the Maidstone to Hawkhurst road and is known as Old Loose Hill.

== Features ==
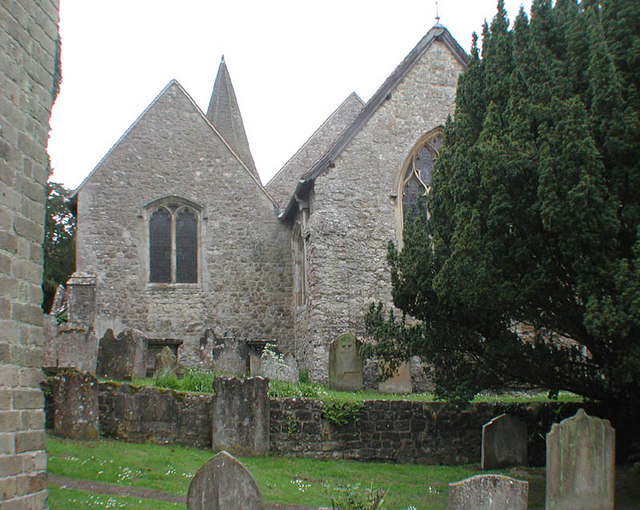
All Saints church

In the village, the Brooks Path is a causeway along the Loose Stream that joins the two ends of the village, dividing the mill pond which once fed the village mill. All Saints Church in the Diocese of Canterbury, overlooks this section of river. A local tradition has it that whoever sticks a pin in the old yew tree in the churchyard, then runs around it anticlockwise at midnight, will on looking through a small window above the Charlton Memorial against the church wall, see a vision of a woman killing a baby. The Reverend Richard Boys was vicar here and also chaplain of St Helena during Napoleon Bonaparte's exile on the island. He is buried in the churchyard.

To the east of the village is the Loose Viaduct, attributed to Thomas Telford and built in 1830 to carry the Maidstone to Hastings road (the present day A229) across the Loose Valley. The village has two public houses. The Chequers is in the valley beside the river and The Walnut Tree on the main A229 opposite Loose Infant School and Loose Junior School, which share the same site. New Line Learning Academy is a secondary school located in the village. A third pub, The Kings Arms, closed in 2005 and is now a private house.

In the centre of Loose Village there is a large 14th-century building, Church House.

== Notable people ==
- The Beechgrove Garden (BBC Scotland) presenter Carole Baxter was born and brought up in the village.
- The novelist Ernest Elmore (who also wrote as John Bude) lived in Loose in the 1930s.
- The artist and calligrapher Mildred Ratcliffe (1899–1988) retired to the cottage at 1, Mill Street in 1959. She painted a number of the village's buildings.
- The illustrator Ralph Steadman lives in the village.

== See also ==
- Loose Stream
- Listed buildings in Loose, Kent
