= London Mystery Magazine =

The London Mystery Magazine (the word "The" was dropped from the cover after the fourth issue, although it remained inside), known as The London Mystery Selection (just London Mystery on the cover) from 1958, was the longest running British mystery magazine lasting from 1949 to its 132nd issue in 1982. Fantasy stories were also published in the magazine, often up to a third of an issue.

== History ==
London Mystery Magazine was the idea of editor Michael Hall, a Manchester, England newspaperman and British Army Veteran who was inspired when he walked past the 200 block of Baker Street in London. Though based in Lower Belgrave Street, Hall obtained permission from the Royal Mail to receive mail at the address of 221b Baker Street then the area of Abbey House of the Abbey Road Building Society. A company official of the Building Society named Samuel William Gibson Morton had answered letters addressed to Sherlock Holmes that had been previously sent there.

After 15 issues, the floundering magazine was taken over by Norman Kark Publishing, who published the magazine on a quarterly basis until 1982. Austen Kark edited the magazine for two years.
