= Loose Stream =

Stream in Kent, England

Loose Stream River Loose, Langley Stream

Location
- Country: England
- Region: Kent
- District: Maidstone

Physical characteristics
- Source: Langley
  - location: Maidstone
  - coordinates: 51°14′4″N 00°35′3″E
- Mouth: Confluence with River Medway
  - location: Tovil
  - coordinates: 51°15′56″N 00°30′36″E
- Length: 8 km (5.0 mi)

Basin features
- Tributaries
  - right: tributary at Loose

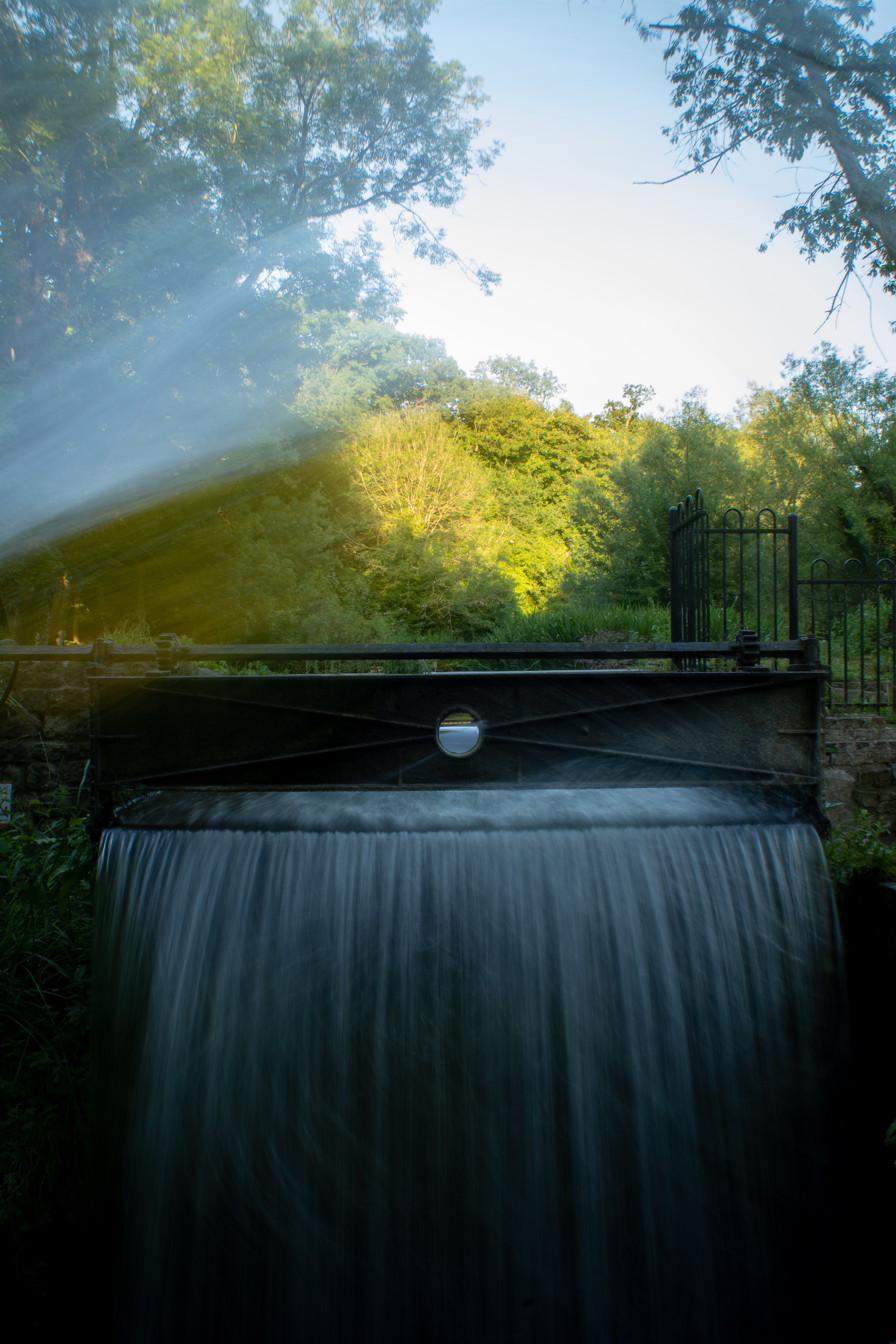
The waterfall in the Loose valley conservation area

The Loose Stream sometimes called the River Loose or Langley Stream is a tributary of the River Medway notable for the number of watermills that it powered in its short length. It rises in Langley, flows through Boughton Monchelsea, Loose and enters the Medway at Tovil. The river valley is deep sided, and there is much evidence of the paper and wool trades which once flourished here: the stream has been dammed in many places, resulting in many mill ponds.

== Watermills ==
Lambarde mentions 13 fulling mills and one corn mill. Camden gives thirteen fulling mills. By c.1715, the Kentish cloth trade had declined, and Harris only mentions two fulling mills and one paper mill. Owing to the purity of the stream, paper making rose in importance in the nineteenth century.

=== Brishing Court mill, Boughton Monchelsea ===
TQ 779 515 51°14′07″N 0°32′51″E

The ancient manor of Brishing Court may have been the site of a mill. There is little evidence supporting the claim to a mill, which would have been demolished by the mid-eighteenth century if it existed.

=== Leg-o-Mutton (Wilson's) Mill, Loose ===
TQ 762 521 51°14′27″N 0°31′31″E

This mill took its name from the shape of the mill pond. It was in the ownership of the Wilson family in the 1870s. In its later life, the mill was converted into three cottages, now demolished. The head of water being some 12 feet (3.66 m) to 15 feet (4.57 m) indicates an overshot waterwheel.

=== Old (Gurney's) Mill ===
TQ 760 521 51°14′27″N 0°31′21″E

Only the foundations of this paper mill remain, by Salts Lane. The mill was demolished after the First World War. It had an overshot waterwheel of 15 feet (4.57 m) diameter and 9 feet (2.74 m) wide.

=== Loose village watermill ===
TQ 758 522 51°14′30″N 0°31′11″E

This was a corn mill, probably the one mentioned by Lambarde. It had an overshot waterwheel driving three pairs of millstones, and was working until the First World War but subsequently demolished.

=== Little Ivy Mill ===
This mill was attached to the manor of Pymps Court in the sixteenth century. It was then a fulling mill. Later it was a paper mill and latterly a corn mill with was converted into a house in 1912, the waterwheel and machinery being scrapped.

=== Great Ivy Mill ===
This was a fulling mill, later a paper mill. The overshot waterwheel was replaced by a turbine but the pentrough remained. Papermaking had ceased before the First World War.

=== Bockingford Mill ===
TQ 75681 53644 51°15′18″N 0°30′58″E

This was once a washing (fulling) mill, converted to corn milling by the mid-nineteenth century. The present building dates from c. 1880 and last worked c. 1892, Mrs Marsham, the owner gave notice to the miller that she wished to terminate his tenancy in April 1891. The mill was extended and converted into a house shortly after. The last miller was a Mr. Wilson, with Tom Bates preceding him. A Mr. Rose, foreman at Little Ivy Mill was one of the first inhabitants of the converted mill. The mill pond was some 300 feet (91 m) long and 70 feet (21 m) wide, giving an area of 2,333 square yards (1,951 m^{2}). The frame of the cast iron waterwheel, some 12 feet (3.66 m) diameter and 8 feet (2.44 m) wide remains under the building.

=== Hayle Mill, Tovil ===
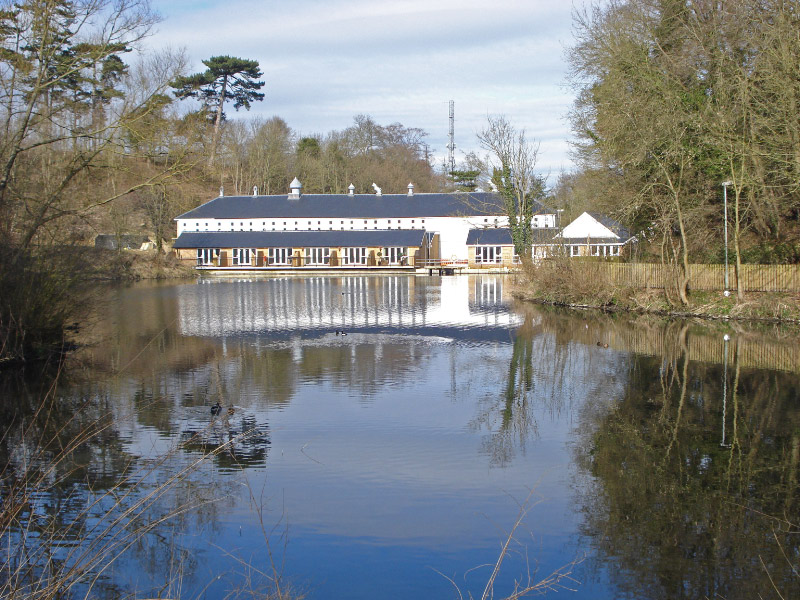
Hayle Mill from the South

TQ 756 538 51°15′22″N 0°31′03″E

This has been the site of a mill for many centuries. The last mill was a paper mill, built in 1808 and was noted for its handmade paper until production ceased in 1987. The mill was bought by John Green in 1817 and remained in the Green family until 2002. In 1905, Herbert Green raised objections to the building of the Headcorn and Maidstone Junction Light Railway, the extension of the Kent and East Sussex Railway, a short portion of which was built as far as Tovil. His main objection was that the smoke from the locomotives would interfere with the operation of his mill. The eventual granting of the light railway order involved a tunnel which was considerably longer than that which was originally proposed, a fact which pleased Mr. Green, who prophesied that "the longer the tunnel the less chance the line would be built."

The mill house burnt down on 20 June 2003, but the mill survived. The house was rebuilt in 2006–07 as part of the conversion of the Mill to apartments. The waterwheel is 12 feet (3.66 m) diameter and 9 feet 9 inches (2.97 m) wide, being an unusual combination of pitchback and high breast shot, having the ability to apply water to the wheel in two different positions. The waterwheel bears the legend 'F. Clark, Millwright, Ashford 1875'.

=== Upper Crisbrook Mill ===
TQ 756 541 51°15′32″N 0°30′55″E

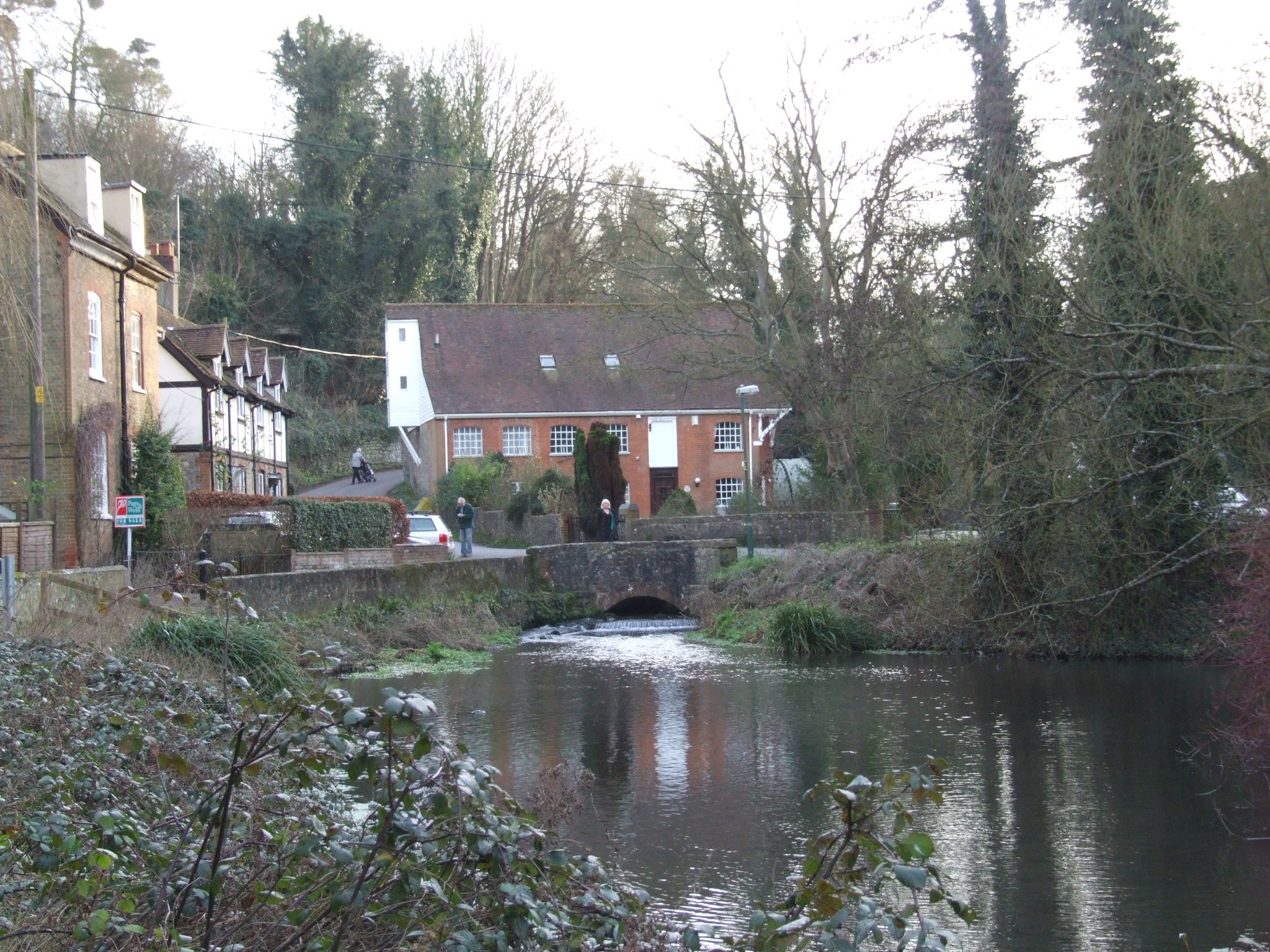
Upper Crisbrook Mill, converted to residential, showing overshot wheel

The seventeenth-century structure latterly had a cast iron overshot waterwheel driving pumping machinery, working until the 1960s. The derelict waterwheel survived in the early 1970s and has now been restored, the mill buildings being house converted c. 1975. Both the Crisbrook mills were the property of the dean and chapter of Canterbury. The ancient spelling of these mills was 'Christbrook/Chrisbrook'.

=== Lower Crisbrook Mill ===
TQ 756 542 51°15′36″N 0°30′55″E

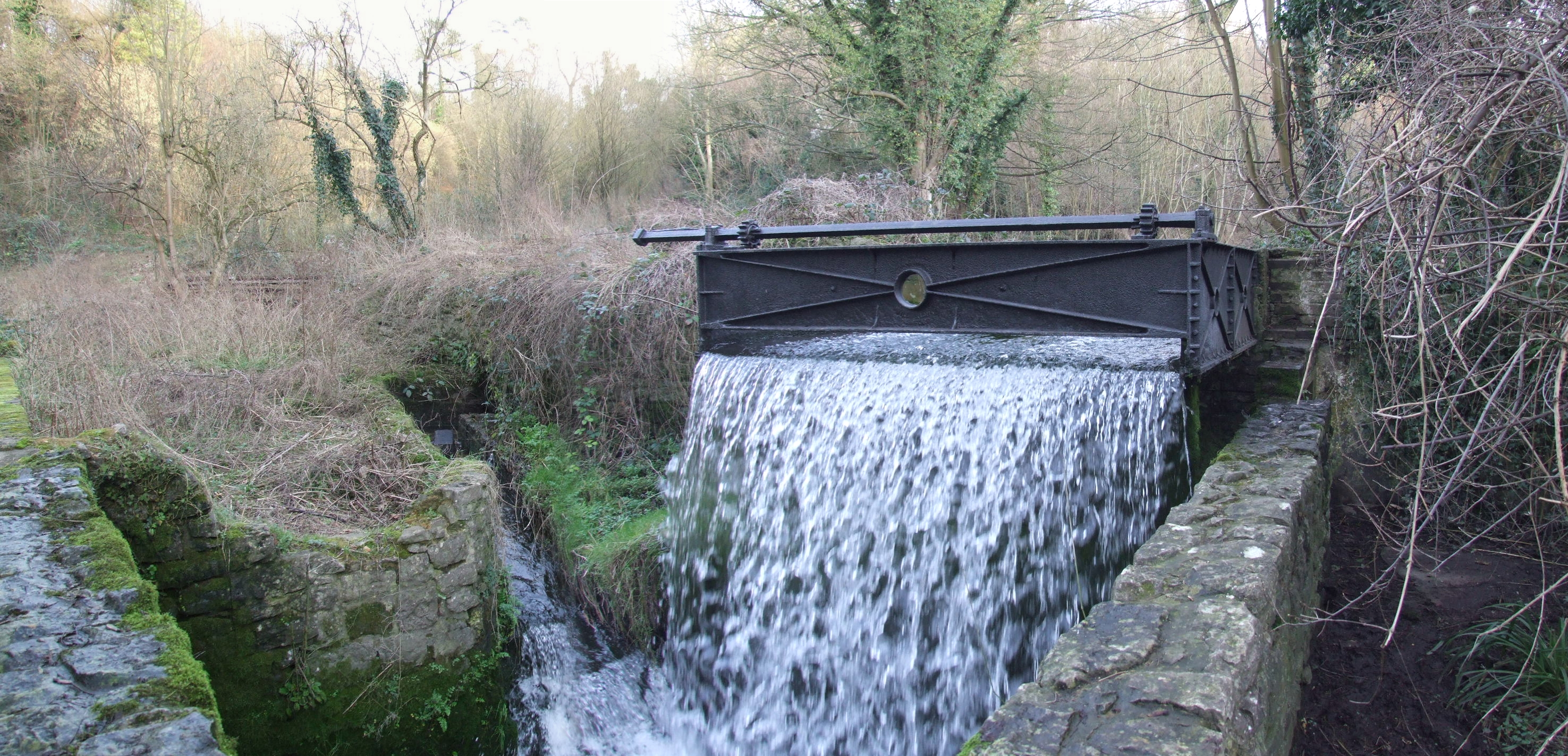
Wheel pit, Lower Chrisbrook Mill

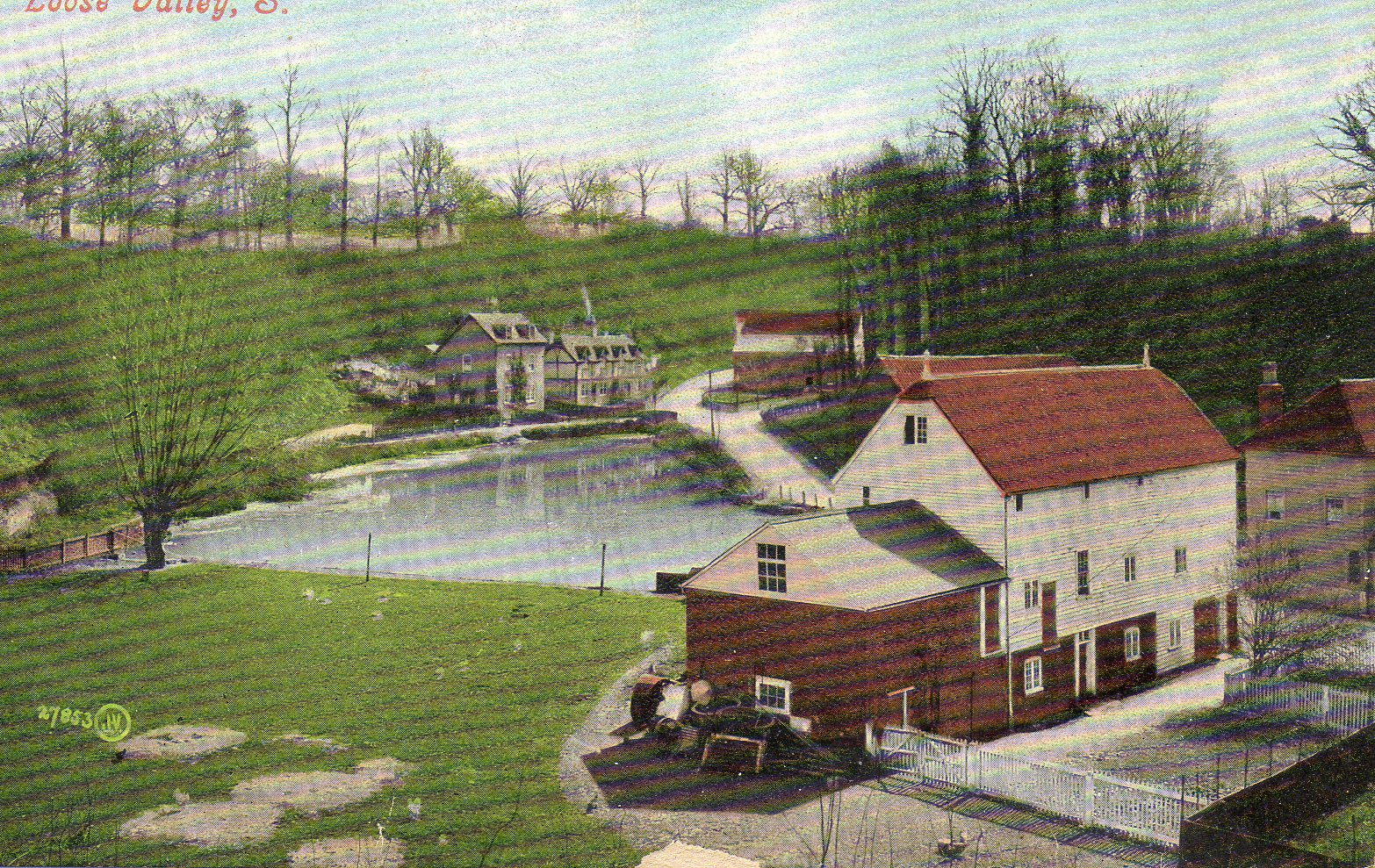
Lower Crisbrook Mill

This late eighteenth-century mill housed an internal water wheel; it was a corn mill c. 1719. It had an overshot waterwheel driving four pairs of millstones. The mill last worked in 1905 and the machinery scrapped some thirty years later. An earlier mill on this site was probably the mill leased by the prior of Canterbury to Robert De Hucham. Only parts of the walls remain today.

=== Upper Tovil Mill ===
TQ 7545 5445 51°15′44″N 0°30′48″E This was a fulling mill, later a paper mill. The mill had an overshot waterwheel but was burnt down in 1894. The fire damaged mill was bought and rebuilt by Albert Reed, acting as the founding point of the company that would go on to become Reed International. The rebuilt mill was powered by steam. The site of the mill was cleared in the 1980s to make way for a housing development. One of the Tovil mills belonged to Maidstone College in 1525.

=== Lower Tovil Mill (Allnut Mill) ===
TQ 7520 5475 51°15′54″N 0°30′35″E This was a fulling mill, later a paper mill. The large overshot waterwheel was scrapped in 1941 but papermaking continued after the war. The buildings have all been demolished and developed for housing.

=== Bridge Mill ===
TQ 750 547 51°15′53″N 0°30′25″E Originally a fulling mill, then a corn mill. A powder mill was established here in the eighteenth century and later an oil mill. Bridge mill was latterly a paper mill, ceasing work in the late twentieth century. The site has been cleared for a housing development.

== Tributary ==
A small stream enters the river at Loose, it powered a watermill.

=== Watermill on the tributary ===
==== Upper Mill, Loose ====
Originally a fulling mill, then a paper mill, latterly a corn mill with an overshot waterwheel driving three pairs of stones. This mill was in the ownership of the Wilson family in the 1870s. It closed in 1908 and has since been demolished.

== Ecology ==
Located to the south-east of Maidstone, the Loose Valley forms the boundary between the urban area of Maidstone and the surrounding countryside. Due to the large number of ponds, the Loose stream and extensive areas of semi-improved grassland, it is a haven for wildlife.

The water quality of the stream has been classified by the Environment Agency as ‘very good’ close to its confluence with the River Medway at Tovil.

The eastern side of the Valley starts as heavily grazed horse pasture. It then becomes a series of long narrow fields bordered by scrub/woodland on the upper edges of the Valley, which are very lightly grazed by cattle. This section of the Valley is owned by the Loose Amenities Association and is managed purely for wildlife, landscape and recreation. It was designated a Conservation Area in September 2000. The village pond in Loose was recently surveyed and contained a mixture of the following species: water mint, meadowsweet, common reed mace, water dropwort, bittersweet, yellow iris, branched bur-reed, greater tussock sedge, brooklime, water figwort, water forget-me-not, great willowherb, and marsh marigold.

Chrisbrook ponds host moorhens, coots and tufted duck, Canada geese visit in the mornings and egrets and kingfishers eat the fish. The quarries provide nesting tunnels for kingfishers.

Winter time is a good time for birdwatching with kingfisher, little grebe, little egret, water rail, ring-necked parakeet, grey wagtail, mallard, moorhen, black headed gull, grey heron and jackdaw regularly seen.

On the dry calcareous semi improved grasslands of the upper valley meadow vetchling, meadow-pea, and bird's-foot trefoil are found. In the transitional scrub, hawthorn, blackthorn and rose are found. It is an extremely valuable habitat and supports species such as dormouse, warblers and butterflies.

The woodland of the Loose Valley contains species such as oak, ash, sycamore, hazel and sweet chestnut.

== See also ==
- Medway watermills
