= Tovil =

Coordinates: 51.2642°N 0.5096°E

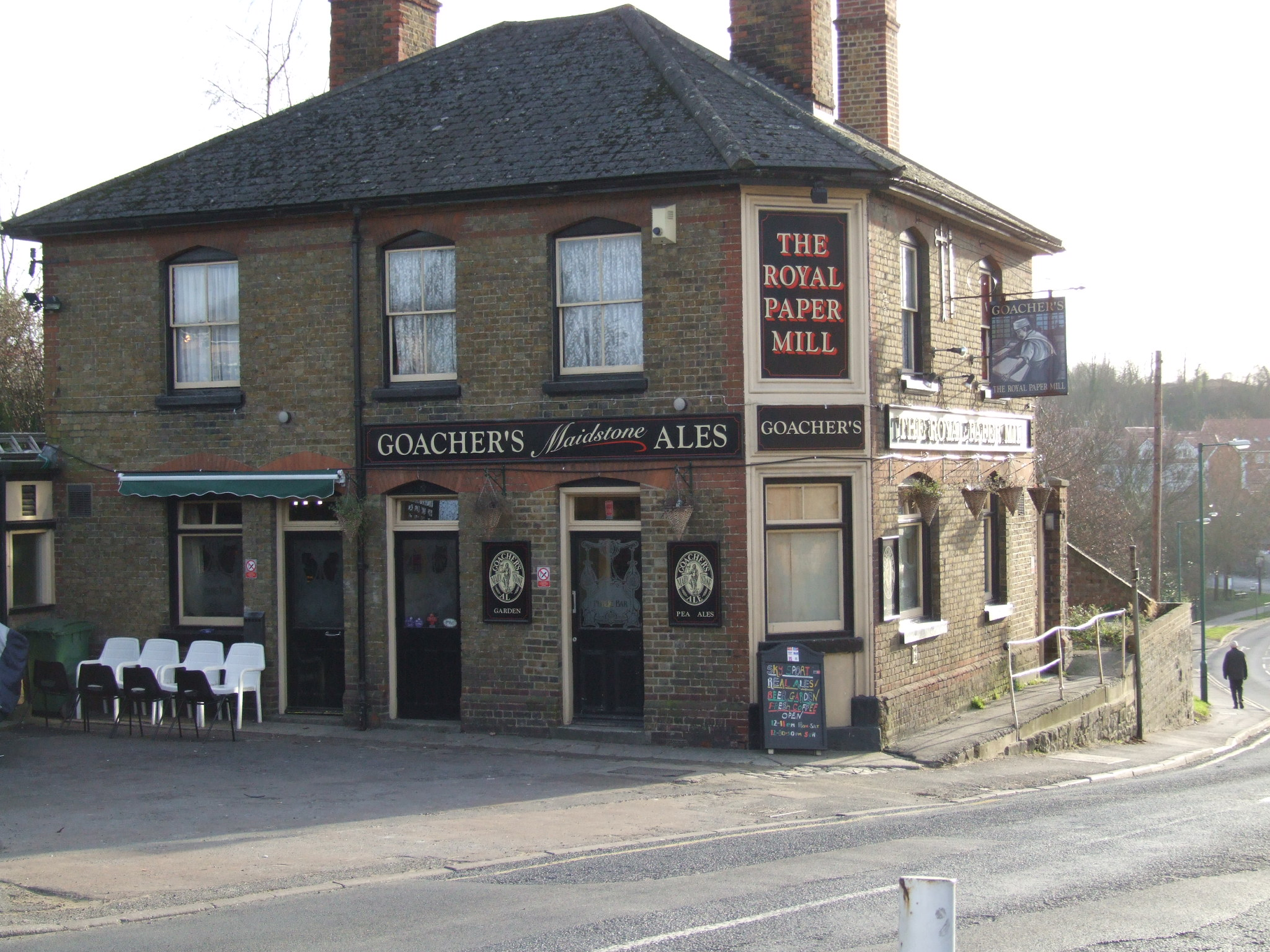
- The Royal Paper Mill on Tovil Hill

- Location within Kent
- Population: 3,542 (2011 Census)
  - London: 33 miles (53 km) NW
- District: Maidstone
- Shire county: Kent
- Region: South East
- Country: England
- Sovereign state: United Kingdom
- Post town: MAIDSTONE
- Postcode district: ME15
- Dialling code: 01622
- Police: Kent
- Fire: Kent
- Ambulance: South East Coast
- UK Parliament: Maidstone and Malling
- Website: Tovil Parish Council

Tovil is a civil parish in the Borough of Maidstone, in Kent in the South East of England. It is a mixture of residential and industrial zoning, with an increase in commercial usage towards the centre of Maidstone, and more arable use on the outskirts.

== History ==
Tovil is mentioned in the Cecil Papers with the leasing of a tenement at Tovil to Thomas Peene, commencing at Michaelmas, 1628.

Tovil has a history of paper mills on the Loose Stream near the River Medway, the last of which ceased operation in the 1980s. These included Great Ivy Mill, Hayle Mill, Upper Tovil Mill, Lower Tovil Mill and Bridge Mill. These and other mills located along the Loose Stream which flows through Tovil were formerly used for fulling, corn and in one case gunpowder. The Tovil Bridge connects Tovil to Barming over the Loose Stream and the Medway.

The church of St Stephen was built in around 1840. The architect was John Whichcord Snr. It was built of ragstone ashlar in the Early English style but demolished in about 1990.

Alabaster Passmore had an important printing works in Tovil and there were other small industries and a railway siding.

Many of the industrial units have been replaced by housing. Loudspeaker manufacturer KEF is based on Eccleston Road. Goachers microbrewery is also based there.

Kent Fire and Rescue Service Headquarters is based in Tovil on Straw Mill Hill.

== Governance ==
Tovil is in the South ward of Maidstone Borough Council, represented as of 2025 by two Liberal Democrat councillors. It is in the Maidstone South division of Kent County Council, represented as of 2025 by one Reform UK councillor. The local MP is the Conservative, Helen Grant.

== See also ==
- Listed buildings in Tovil
