= List of civil parishes in Kent =

This is a list of civil parishes in the ceremonial county of Kent, England. There are 326 civil parishes.

Population figures are unavailable for some of the smallest parishes.

The following former districts (or parts of) are unparished: Tunbridge Wells Municipal Borough, Tonbridge Urban District, Margate Municipal Borough, Sittingbourne and Milton Urban District, Queenborough-in-Sheppey, Municipal Borough of Rochester, Municipal Borough of Gillingham, Municipal Borough of Chatham, Maidstone Municipal Borough, Northfleet Urban District, Gravesend Municipal Borough, Dartford Municipal Borough, Canterbury County Borough, Herne Bay Urban District, Whitstable Urban District and Ashford Urban District.

Civil Parish	Civil Parish Population 2011	Area (km^{2}) 2011	Pre 1974 District	District
Acol	295	2.15	Eastry Rural District	Thanet
Acrise	172	5.43	Elham Rural District	Folkestone and Hythe
Addington	769	3.35	Malling Rural District	Tonbridge and Malling
Adisham	645	11.82	Bridge-Blean Rural District	Canterbury
Aldington	1,248	18.22	East Ashford Rural District	Ashford
Alkham	688	13.01	Dover Rural District	Dover
Allhallows	1,676	9.30	Strood Rural District	Medway
Appledore	749	12.46	Tenterden Rural District	Ashford
Ash-cum-Ridley	6,641	14.24	Dartford Rural District	Sevenoaks
Ash	4,985	8.59	Eastry Rural District	Dover
Aylesford	10,660	17.59	Malling Rural District	Tonbridge and Malling
Aylesham	3,999	5.39	Eastry Rural District	Dover
Badgers Mount	20,409	15.96	Sevenoaks Rural District	Sevenoaks
Badlesmere	134	3.92	Swale Rural District	Swale
Bapchild	1,141	1.37	Swale Rural District	Swale
Barham	1,355	14.54	Bridge-Blean Rural District	Canterbury
Barming	1,690	3.64	Maidstone Rural District	Maidstone
Bean	1,643	3.38	Dartford Rural District	Dartford
Bearsted	8,209	2.80	Maidstone Rural District	Maidstone
Bekesbourne-with-Patrixbourne	925	8.47	Bridge-Blean Rural District	Canterbury
Benenden	2,374	27.10	Cranbrook Rural District	Tunbridge Wells
Bethersden	1,481	26.10	West Ashford Rural District	Ashford
Bicknor	176	7.42	Hollingbourne Rural District	Maidstone
Bidborough	1,163	8.18	Tonbridge Rural District	Tunbridge Wells
Biddenden	2,574	29.12	Tenterden Rural District	Ashford
Bilsington	284	11.12	East Ashford Rural District	Ashford
Birchington	9,961	7.33	Margate Municipal Borough	Thanet
Birling	437	6.80	Malling Rural District	Tonbridge and Malling
Bishopsbourne	257	9.18	Bridge-Blean Rural District	Canterbury
Blean	5,589	13.68	Bridge-Blean Rural District	Canterbury
Bobbing	1,969	6.22	Swale Rural District	Swale
Bonnington			East Ashford Rural District	Ashford
Borden	2,432	7.19	Swale Rural District	Swale
Borough Green	3,672	2.17	Malling Rural District	Tonbridge and Malling
Boughton Aluph	2,490	9.93	East Ashford Rural District	Ashford
Boughton Malherbe	476	11.08	Hollingbourne Rural District	Maidstone
Boughton Monchelsea	3,313	10.97	Maidstone Rural District	Maidstone
Boughton under Blean	1,917	7.73	Swale Rural District	Swale
Boxley	9,554	22.20	Hollingbourne Rural District	Maidstone
Brabourne	1,309	14.76	East Ashford Rural District	Ashford
Brasted	1,429	14.54	Sevenoaks Rural District	Sevenoaks
Bredgar	659	8.76	Swale Rural District	Swale
Bredhurst	397	2.29	Hollingbourne Rural District	Maidstone
Brenchley and Matfield	2,863	21.89	Tonbridge Rural District	Tunbridge Wells
Brenzett	379	10.91	Romney Marsh Rural District	Folkestone and Hythe
Bridge	1,576	4.08	Bridge-Blean Rural District	Canterbury
Broadstairs and St Peters (town)	24,903	11.36	Broadstairs and St Peters Urban District	Thanet
Brook	310	4.01	East Ashford Rural District	Ashford
Brookland	479	9.72	Romney Marsh Rural District	Folkestone and Hythe
Broomfield and Kingswood	1,604	5.86	Hollingbourne Rural District	Maidstone
Burham	1,195	5.88	Malling Rural District	Tonbridge and Malling
Burmarsh	330	17.24	Romney Marsh Rural District	Folkestone and Hythe
Capel	2,467	21.15	Tonbridge Rural District	Tunbridge Wells
Capel le Ferne	1,884	5.98	Dover Rural District	Dover
Challock	920	14.07	East Ashford Rural District	Ashford
Charing	2,766	24.89	West Ashford Rural District	Ashford
Chart Sutton	870	8.85	Hollingbourne Rural District	Maidstone
Chartham	4,261	20.83	Bridge-Blean Rural District	Canterbury
Chestfield	3,214	7.94	Whitstable Urban District	Canterbury
Chevening	3,092	15.59	Sevenoaks Rural District	Sevenoaks
Chiddingstone	1,250	24.65	Sevenoaks Rural District	Sevenoaks
Chilham	1,634	17.86	East Ashford Rural District	Ashford
Chislet	872	18.25	Bridge-Blean Rural District	Canterbury
Cliffe and Cliffe Woods	5,370	22.43	Strood Rural District	Medway
Cliffsend	1,822	2.24	Ramsgate Municipal Borough	Thanet
Cobham	1,469	13.01	Strood Rural District	Gravesham
Collier Street	796	12.73	Maidstone Rural District	Maidstone
Cooling	216	8.38	Strood Rural District	Medway
Cowden	818	12.61	Sevenoaks Rural District	Sevenoaks
Coxheath	4,082	2.32	Maidstone Rural District	Maidstone
Cranbrook and Sissinghurst	6,717	41.95	Cranbrook Rural District	Tunbridge Wells
Crockenhill	1,654	7.05	Dartford Rural District	Sevenoaks
Crundale	186	6.39	East Ashford Rural District	Ashford
Cuxton	2,627	7.66	Strood Rural District	Medway
Darenth	4,851	9.04	Dartford Rural District	Dartford
Deal (town)	20,823	6.27	Deal Municipal Borough	Dover
Denton with Wootton	372	13.68	Dover Rural District	Dover
Detling	796	6.24	Hollingbourne Rural District	Maidstone
Ditton	4,786	4.26	Malling Rural District	Tonbridge and Malling
Doddington	527	8.81	Swale Rural District	Swale
Dover (town)	31,022	14.08	Dover Municipal Borough	Dover
Downswood	2,291	0.37	Maidstone Rural District	Maidstone
Dunkirk	1,187	13.37	Swale Rural District	Swale
Dunton Green	2,360	3.90	Sevenoaks Rural District	Sevenoaks
Dymchurch	3,725	5.80	Romney Marsh Rural District	Folkestone and Hythe
East Farleigh	1,500	5.60	Maidstone Rural District	Maidstone
East Malling and Larkfield	14,185	10.88	Malling Rural District	Tonbridge and Malling
East Peckham	3,306	12.89	Malling Rural District	Tonbridge and Malling
East Sutton	402	6.45	Hollingbourne Rural District	Maidstone
Eastchurch	3,022	23.17	Queenborough in Sheppey Municipal Borough	Swale
Eastling	365	8.46	Swale Rural District	Swale
Eastry	2,492	10.80	Eastry Rural District	Dover
Eastwell	103	3.62	East Ashford Rural District	Ashford
Edenbridge (town)	8,907	22.02	Sevenoaks Rural District	Sevenoaks
Egerton	1,073	12.38	West Ashford Rural District	Ashford
Elham	1,509	25.52	Elham Rural District	Folkestone and Hythe
Elmsted	319	10.44	Elham Rural District	Folkestone and Hythe
Eynsford	1,814	14.54	Dartford Rural District	Sevenoaks
Eythorne	2,594	7.35	Eastry Rural District	Dover
Farningham	1,319	9.65	Dartford Rural District	Sevenoaks
Faversham (town)	19,316	11.16	Faversham Municipal Borough	Swale
Fawkham	578	6.64	Dartford Rural District	Sevenoaks
Folkestone (town)	46,698	14.09	Folkestone Municipal Borough	Folkestone and Hythe
Fordwich (town)	381	1.81	Bridge-Blean Rural District	Canterbury
Frindsbury Extra	6,501	8.34	Strood Rural District	Medway
Frinsted	143	8.53	Hollingbourne Rural District	Maidstone
Frittenden	888	14.21	Cranbrook Rural District	Tunbridge Wells
Godmersham	376	15.70	East Ashford Rural District	Ashford
Goodnestone	378	10.70	Eastry Rural District	Dover
Goudhurst	3,327	38.92	Cranbrook Rural District	Tunbridge Wells
Graveney with Goodnestone	490	12.73	Swale Rural District	Swale
Great Chart with Singleton	6,801	13.31	West Ashford Rural District	Ashford
Great Mongeham	762	2.16	Deal Municipal Borough	Dover
Guston	1,740	5.40	Dover Rural District	Dover
Hackington	587	5.92	Bridge-Blean Rural District	Canterbury
Hadlow	3,983	19.19	Tonbridge Rural District	Tonbridge and Malling
Halling	2,821	7.48	Strood Rural District	Medway
Halstead	1,607	5.89	Sevenoaks Rural District	Sevenoaks
Harbledown and Rough Common	2,174	7.55	Bridge-Blean Rural District	Canterbury
Harrietsham	2,113	10.26	Hollingbourne Rural District	Maidstone
Hartley	5,359	5.54	Dartford Rural District	Sevenoaks
Hartlip	743	5.80	Swale Rural District	Swale
Hastingleigh	230	6.33	East Ashford Rural District	Ashford
Hawkhurst	4,911	26.33	Cranbrook Rural District	Tunbridge Wells
Hawkinge	8,002	11.23	Elham Rural District	Folkestone and Hythe
Headcorn	3,387	21.25	Hollingbourne Rural District	Maidstone
Herne and Broomfield	8,440	10.97	Herne Bay Urban District	Canterbury
Hernhill	692	10.60	Swale Rural District	Swale
Hersden			Bridge-Blean Rural District	Canterbury
Hever	1,231	14.81	Sevenoaks Rural District	Sevenoaks
Hextable	4,092	1.98	Dartford Rural District	Sevenoaks
High Halden	1,584	15.18	Tenterden Rural District	Ashford
High Halstow	1,807	11.90	Strood Rural District	Medway
Higham	3,962	13.22	Strood Rural District	Gravesham
Hildenborough	4,954	17.00	Tonbridge Rural District	Tonbridge and Malling
Hoath	551	6.51	Bridge-Blean Rural District	Canterbury
Hollingbourne	949	17.79	Hollingbourne Rural District	Maidstone
Hoo St Werburgh	8,945	19.05	Strood Rural District	Medway
Horsmonden	2,435	20.08	Tonbridge Rural District	Tunbridge Wells
Horton Kirby and South Darenth	3,492	10.52	Dartford Rural District	Sevenoaks
Hothfield	780	9.59	West Ashford Rural District	Ashford
Hougham Without	463	8.45	Dover Rural District	Dover
Hucking			Hollingbourne Rural District	Maidstone
Hunton	702	8.00	Maidstone Rural District	Maidstone
Hythe (town)	14,516	12.27	Hythe Municipal Borough	Folkestone and Hythe
Ickham and Well	437	9.30	Bridge-Blean Rural District	Canterbury
Ightham	2,084	9.24	Malling Rural District	Tonbridge and Malling
Isle of Grain	1,648	12.50	Strood Rural District	Medway
Ivychurch	253	19.26	Romney Marsh Rural District	Folkestone and Hythe
Iwade	3,087	13.09	Swale Rural District	Swale
Kemsing	4,218	8.94	Sevenoaks Rural District	Sevenoaks
Kenardington	247	7.47	Tenterden Rural District	Ashford
Kennington	3,365	28.37		Ashford
Kings Hill	7,435	3.24	Malling Rural District	Tonbridge and Malling
Kingsnorth	11,243	12.46	West Ashford Rural District	Ashford
Kingston	471	5.11	Bridge-Blean Rural District	Canterbury
Knockholt	1,222	7.44	Sevenoaks Rural District	Sevenoaks
Lamberhurst	1,706	21.66	Tonbridge Rural District	Tunbridge Wells
Langdon	558	7.91	Dover Rural District	Dover
Langley	1,187	3.94	Hollingbourne Rural District	Maidstone
Leaveland	100	1.54	Swale Rural District	Swale
Leeds	790	6.69	Hollingbourne Rural District	Maidstone
Leigh	1,793	16.19	Sevenoaks Rural District	Sevenoaks
Lenham	3,370	23.49	Hollingbourne Rural District	Maidstone
Leybourne	3,218	2.72	Malling Rural District	Tonbridge and Malling
Leysdown	1,256	20.74	Queenborough in Sheppey Municipal Borough	Swale
Linton	555	7.44	Maidstone Rural District	Maidstone
Little Chart	234	6.01	West Ashford Rural District	Ashford
Littlebourne	1,529	8.52	Bridge-Blean Rural District	Canterbury
Longfield and New Barn	4,919	3.57	Dartford Rural District	Dartford
Loose	2,277	2.68	Maidstone Rural District	Maidstone
Lower Halstow	1,180	5.22	Swale Rural District	Swale
Lower Hardres and Nackington	570	9.14	Bridge-Blean Rural District	Canterbury
Luddenham			Swale Rural District	Swale
Luddesdown	220	8.10	Strood Rural District	Gravesham
Lydd (town)	6,567	48.24	Lydd Municipal Borough	Folkestone and Hythe
Lydden	673	6.93	Dover Rural District	Dover
Lyminge	2,717	16.32	Elham Rural District	Folkestone and Hythe
Lympne	1,575	10.60	Elham Rural District	Folkestone and Hythe
Lynsted with Kingsdown	1,094	7.16	Swale Rural District	Swale
Manston	1,138	9.95	Margate Municipal Borough	Thanet
Marden	3,724	27.47	Maidstone Rural District	Maidstone
Meopham	6,722	20.22	Strood Rural District	Gravesham
Mereworth	1,068	9.73	Malling Rural District	Tonbridge and Malling
Mersham	1,124	13.85	East Ashford Rural District	Ashford
Milstead	283	8.52	Swale Rural District	Swale
Minster	3,569	19.54	Eastry Rural District	Thanet
Minster-on-Sea	14,789	30.53	Queenborough in Sheppey Municipal Borough	Swale
Molash	246	6.38	East Ashford Rural District	Ashford
Monks Horton			Elham Rural District	Folkestone and Hythe
Monkton	661	9.59	Eastry Rural District	Thanet
Nettlestead	870	5.28	Maidstone Rural District	Maidstone
New Romney (town)	6,996	6.41	New Romney Municipal Borough	Folkestone and Hythe
Newchurch	315	15.80	Romney Marsh Rural District	Folkestone and Hythe
Newenden	223	4.23	Tenterden Rural District	Ashford
Newington	368	9.58	Elham Rural District	Folkestone and Hythe
Newington	2,551	7.49	Swale Rural District	Swale
Newnham	386	4.29	Swale Rural District	Swale
Nonington	906	10.13	Eastry Rural District	Dover
Northbourne	772	11.75	Eastry Rural District	Dover
Norton, Buckland and Stone	467	14.64	Swale Rural District	Swale
Oare	513	4.63	Swale Rural District	Swale
Offham	755	8.05	Malling Rural District	Tonbridge and Malling
Old Romney	215	23.26	Romney Marsh Rural District	Folkestone and Hythe
Orlestone	1,407	7.92	East Ashford Rural District	Ashford
Ospringe	771	10.42	Swale Rural District	Swale
Otford	3,465	6.88	Sevenoaks Rural District	Sevenoaks
Otham	523	3.38	Maidstone Rural District	Maidstone
Otterden	162	6.15	Hollingbourne Rural District	Maidstone
Paddlesworth			Elham Rural District	Folkestone and Hythe
Paddock Wood (town)	8,253	9.83	Tonbridge Rural District	Tunbridge Wells
Pembury	6,128	14.34	Tonbridge Rural District	Tunbridge Wells
Penshurst	1,628	16.18	Sevenoaks Rural District	Sevenoaks
Petham	708	13.61	Bridge-Blean Rural District	Canterbury
Platt	1,679	6.96	Malling Rural District	Tonbridge and Malling
Plaxtol	1,117	9.71	Malling Rural District	Tonbridge and Malling
Pluckley	1,069	12.62	West Ashford Rural District	Ashford
Postling	206	6.33	Elham Rural District	Folkestone and Hythe
Preston	674	8.23	Eastry Rural District	Dover
Queenborough (town)	3,407	7.21	Queenborough in Sheppey Municipal Borough	Swale
Ramsgate (town)	40,408	9.87	Ramsgate Municipal Borough	Thanet
Ringwould with Kingsdown	2,030	6.38	Dover Rural District	Dover
Ripple	372	5.20	Eastry Rural District	Dover
River	3,876	2.54	Dover Municipal Borough	Dover
Riverhead	2,634	2.86	Sevenoaks Rural District	Sevenoaks
Rodmersham	555	5.66	Swale Rural District	Swale
Rolvenden	1,414	23.28	Tenterden Rural District	Ashford
Ruckinge	711	13.91	East Ashford Rural District	Ashford
Rusthall	4,976	1.72	Tunbridge Wells Municipal Borough	Tunbridge Wells
Ryarsh	696	3.81	Malling Rural District	Tonbridge and Malling
Saltwood	850	9.35	Elham Rural District	Folkestone and Hythe
Sandgate	4,639	2.07	Folkestone Municipal Borough	Folkestone and Hythe
Sandhurst	1,478	17.89	Cranbrook Rural District	Tunbridge Wells
Sandwich (town)			Sandwich Municipal Borough	Dover
Sarre	222	2.71	Eastry Rural District	Thanet
Seal	2,556	18.62	Sevenoaks Rural District	Sevenoaks
Sellindge	1,601	7.24	Elham Rural District	Folkestone and Hythe
Selling	849	10.60	Swale Rural District	Swale
Sevenoaks Weald	1,222	8.97	Sevenoaks Rural District	Sevenoaks
Sevenoaks (town)			Sevenoaks Urban District	Sevenoaks
Sevington with Finberry	310	0.76	East Ashford Rural District	Ashford
Shadoxhurst	1,216	8.03	West Ashford Rural District	Ashford
Sheerness			Queenborough in Sheppey Municipal Borough	Swale
Sheldwich	491	8.90	Swale Rural District	Swale
Shepherdswell with Coldred	1,849	13.57	Dover Rural District	Dover
Shipbourne	470	9.00	Malling Rural District	Tonbridge and Malling
Sholden	1,084	7.35	Eastry Rural District	Dover
Shoreham	2,041	20.26	Sevenoaks Rural District	Sevenoaks
Shorne	2,487	13.21	Strood Rural District	Gravesham
Smarden	1,301	21.80	West Ashford Rural District	Ashford
Smeeth	924	8.29	East Ashford Rural District	Ashford
Snargate	134	12.27	Romney Marsh Rural District	Folkestone and Hythe
Snodland (town)	10,211	8.80	Malling Rural District	Tonbridge and Malling
South Willesborough and Newtown				Ashford
Southborough (town)	12,061	7.33	Southborough Urban District	Tunbridge Wells
Southfleet	1,327	9.15	Dartford Rural District	Dartford
Speldhurst	4,978	16.23	Tonbridge Rural District	Tunbridge Wells
St Margaret's at Cliffe	2,499	13.03	Dover Rural District	Dover
St Mary Hoo	238	9.14	Strood Rural District	Medway
St Mary in the Marsh	2,819	13.96	Romney Marsh Rural District	Folkestone and Hythe
St Nicholas-at-Wade	853	14.34	Eastry Rural District	Thanet
Stalisfield	205	9.47	Swale Rural District	Swale
Stanford	429	4.81	Elham Rural District	Folkestone and Hythe
Stanhope	4,068	0.57	West Ashford Rural District	Ashford
Stansted	484	7.99	Malling Rural District	Tonbridge and Malling
Staple	551	4.62	Eastry Rural District	Dover
Staplehurst	5,947	23.85	Maidstone Rural District	Maidstone
Stelling Minnis	578	8.73	Elham Rural District	Folkestone and Hythe
Stockbury	691	12.81	Hollingbourne Rural District	Maidstone
Stoke	1,060	9.06	Strood Rural District	Medway
Stone	10,778	6.11	Dartford Rural District	Dartford
Stone cum Ebony	460	19.18	Tenterden Rural District	Ashford
Stourmouth	268	3.62	Eastry Rural District	Dover
Stowting	351	10.96	Elham Rural District	Folkestone and Hythe
Sturry	6,820	13.41	Bridge-Blean Rural District	Canterbury
Sundridge with Ide Hill	1,877	16.75	Sevenoaks Rural District	Sevenoaks
Sutton Valence	1,665	8.59	Hollingbourne Rural District	Maidstone
Sutton	772	13.74	Eastry Rural District	Dover
Sutton at Hone and Hawley	4,230	7.54	Dartford Rural District	Dartford
Swanley (town)	16,226	7.15	Dartford Rural District	Sevenoaks
Swanscombe and Greenhithe (town)	14,128	8.64	Swanscombe Urban District	Dartford
Swingfield	1,227	8.88	Elham Rural District	Folkestone and Hythe
Temple Ewell	1,669	4.55	Dover Rural District	Dover
Tenterden (town)	7,735	36.19	Tenterden Municipal Borough	Ashford
Teston	637	2.10	Maidstone Rural District	Maidstone
Teynham	2,913	9.21	Swale Rural District	Swale
Thanington	2,662	4.80	Bridge-Blean Rural District	Canterbury
Throwley	300	13.15	Swale Rural District	Swale
Thurnham	1,207	12.84	Hollingbourne Rural District	Maidstone
Tilmanstone	401	7.92	Eastry Rural District	Dover
Tonge	336	9.37	Swale Rural District	Swale
Tovil	3,542	2.49	Maidstone Municipal Borough	Maidstone
Trottiscliffe	485	5.54	Malling Rural District	Tonbridge and Malling
Tunstall	884	4.12	Swale Rural District	Swale
Ulcombe	890	14.24	Hollingbourne Rural District	Maidstone
Upchurch	2,484	11.90	Swale Rural District	Swale
Upper Hardres	385	8.11	Bridge-Blean Rural District	Canterbury
Vigo	2,065	0.69	Strood Rural District	Gravesham
Walmer	8,178	3.40	Deal Municipal Borough	Dover
Waltham	436	11.86	Bridge-Blean Rural District	Canterbury
Warden	1,763	0.81	Queenborough in Sheppey Municipal Borough	Swale
Warehorne	370	10.66	East Ashford Rural District	Ashford
Wateringbury	2,104	5.40	Malling Rural District	Tonbridge and Malling
West Farleigh	474	4.49	Maidstone Rural District	Maidstone
West Kingsdown	5,484	15.97	Dartford Rural District	Sevenoaks
West Malling	2,590	3.83	Malling Rural District	Tonbridge and Malling
West Peckham	350	6.35	Malling Rural District	Tonbridge and Malling
Westbere	376	3.52	Bridge-Blean Rural District	Canterbury
Westerham	4,475	22.87	Sevenoaks Rural District	Sevenoaks
Westgate-on-Sea				Thanet
Westwell	703	12.56	West Ashford Rural District	Ashford
Whitfield	5,142	6.98	Dover Rural District	Dover
Wichling	123	5.60	Hollingbourne Rural District	Maidstone
Wickhambreaux	485	11.31	Bridge-Blean Rural District	Canterbury
Wilmington	7,178	6.77	Dartford Rural District	Dartford
Wingham	1,775	10.18	Eastry Rural District	Dover
Wittersham	1,112	14.66	Tenterden Rural District	Ashford
Womenswold	286	7.44	Bridge-Blean Rural District	Canterbury
Woodchurch	1,903	27.95	Tenterden Rural District	Ashford
Woodnesborough	1,066	10.29	Eastry Rural District	Dover
Wormshill	201	6.84	Hollingbourne Rural District	Maidstone
Worth	992	16.30	Eastry Rural District	Dover
Wouldham	1,497	6.98	Malling Rural District	Tonbridge and Malling
Wrotham	1,921	13.76	Malling Rural District	Tonbridge and Malling
Wye with Hinxhill	2,282	24.10	East Ashford Rural District	Ashford
Yalding	2,418	15.98	Maidstone Rural District	Maidstone

== See also ==
- List of civil parishes in England
