= Grade II* listed buildings in Maidstone (borough) =

There are over 20,000 Grade II* listed buildings in England. This page is a list of these buildings in the district of Maidstone in Kent.

== Maidstone ==
Name	Location	Type	Completed (Note: The date given is the date used by Historic England as significant for the initial building or that of an important part in the structure's description.)	Date designated	Grid ref. (Note: The grid reference is based on the British national grid reference system, sometimes known as OSGB36, used by the Ordnance Survey.) Geo-coordinates	Entry number (Note: The "List Entry Number" is a unique number assigned to each listed building and scheduled monument by Historic England.)	Image
Church of St Margaret	Barming, Maidstone	Tower	Late 14th century or early 15th century	23 May 1967	TQ7200854225; 51°15′40″N 0°27′50″E	1060773	Church of St Margaret More images
Church of St James	Bicknor	Church	1859-61	26 April 1968	TQ8605658821; 51°17′53″N 0°40′03″E	1185510	Church of St James More images
Court Lodge	Bicknor	House	Mid 17th century	26 April 1968	TQ8623858635; 51°17′47″N 0°40′12″E	1086227	Upload Photo
Church of St Nicholas	Boughton Malherbe	Parish Church	13th century	26 April 1968	TQ8822849553; 51°12′51″N 0°41′37″E	1060861	Church of St Nicholas More images
Hazel Hill Cottage	Sandway, Boughton Malherbe	Timber Framed House	c. 1400	2 February 1989	TQ8948049212; 51°12′38″N 0°42′41″E	1252611	Hazel Hill Cottage
Brishing Court	Boughton Monchelsea	Farmhouse	Early 15th century	25 July 1952	TQ7778551451; 51°14′04″N 0°32′43″E	1344355	Upload Photo
Church of St Peter	Boughton Monchelsea	Church	possible late 11th century or 12th century	25 March 1987	TQ7711549895; 51°13′15″N 0°32′06″E	1060754	Church of St Peter More images
Elm House and attached Railings	Boughton Monchelsea	House	Early 18th century	23 May 1967	TQ7742051149; 51°13′55″N 0°32′23″E	1068795	Upload Photo
Harts House	Boughton Monchelsea	House	Later	25 July 1952	TQ7685151851; 51°14′18″N 0°31′55″E	1060784	Upload Photo
Hertsfield Bridges	Boughton Monchelsea	Bridge	14th century or 15th century	25 July 1952	TQ7825046762; 51°11′32″N 0°32′58″E	1060786	Hertsfield Bridges More images
Lychgate	Boughton Monchelsea	Lych Gate	16th century or earlier	25 July 1952	TQ7709449920; 51°13′16″N 0°32′05″E	1068606	Lychgate More images
Rabbit's Cross Farmhouse	Boughton Monchelsea	Farmhouse	15th century	23 May 1967	TQ7851447381; 51°11′52″N 0°33′13″E	1060770	Rabbit's Cross Farmhouse More images
Rock Cottage	Boughton Monchelsea	Continuous Jetty House	Late 16th century	23 May 1967	TQ7686651889; 51°14′20″N 0°31′56″E	1344353	Upload Photo
Boxley Abbey House	Boxley Abbey, Boxley	Abbey	1146 (founded)	20 October 1952	TQ7610358681; 51°18′00″N 0°31′29″E	1086228	Boxley Abbey House More images
Parsonage Farm	Boxley	House	Early 14th century	20 October 1952	TQ7738858895; 51°18′06″N 0°32′36″E	1185727	Upload Photo
St Andrew's Chapel	Boxley	Abbey	Late 15th century	20 October 1952	TQ7573658645; 51°17′59″N 0°31′10″E	1185580	Upload Photo
Weavering Manor	Weavering, Boxley	Timber Framed House	Early 17th century	13 July 1978	TQ7838755792; 51°16′24″N 0°33′22″E	1185828	Upload Photo
Church of St Margaret	Broomfield and Kingswood	Church	Late 11th century or 12th century	26 April 1968	TQ8400152495; 51°14′31″N 0°38′05″E	1060942	Church of St Margaret More images
Dunbury Farmhouse	Chart Sutton	Farmhouse	14th century	18 December 1985	TQ7916246288; 51°11′16″N 0°33′44″E	1060947	Upload Photo
Rugmer Hill Farmhouse	Collier Street	Farmhouse	late 14th century or early 15th century	23 May 1967	TQ7115048107; 51°12′24″N 0°26′55″E	1320370	Upload Photo
Church of Saint Mary	East Farleigh	Tower	13th century possibly earlier origins	23 May 1967	TQ7341453317; 51°15′10″N 0°29′01″E	1249534	Church of Saint Mary More images
Luckhurst	East Sutton	Farmhouse	Late 15th century or early 16th century	26 April 1968	TQ8327947936; 51°12′04″N 0°37′19″E	1068646	Upload Photo
Noahs Ark Farmhouse	East Sutton	Farmhouse	14th century or early 15th century	18 December 1985	TQ8246746694; 51°11′25″N 0°36′35″E	1356139	Upload Photo
Parsonage Farmhouse	East Sutton	Farmhouse	Early to mid 15th century	26 April 1968	TQ8331349287; 51°12′48″N 0°37′24″E	1356171	Parsonage Farmhouse More images
The Blue House	East Sutton	House	Early 17th century	26 April 1968	TQ8317850251; 51°13′19″N 0°37′18″E	1344269	Upload Photo
Walnut Tree Cottage	East Sutton	House	Late C16/early 17th century	18 December 1985	TQ8375149379; 51°12′51″N 0°37′46″E	1060930	Upload Photo
Church of St Dunstan	Frinsted	Parish Church	12th century	26 April 1968	TQ8917257403; 51°17′04″N 0°42′41″E	1336286	Church of St Dunstan More images
Yokes Court	Frinsted	House	Early 17th century	26 April 1968	TQ8996056532; 51°16′35″N 0°43′20″E	1336287	Yokes Court More images
Gazebo cum Boathouse at TQ 872 529	Harrietsham	Boat House	1st half of 18th century	26 April 1968	TQ8711452953; 51°14′42″N 0°40′46″E	1185158	Upload Photo
Greenway Forstal Farmhouse	Greenway Forstal, Harrietsham	Farmhouse	late 16th century or early 17th century	26 April 1968	TQ8513253415; 51°14′59″N 0°39′05″E	1299691	Greenway Forstal Farmhouse More images
Harrietsham Manor	Stede Hill, Harrietsham	House	Late 16th century	14 December 1984	TQ8785054210; 51°15′22″N 0°41′26″E	1086156	Harrietsham Manor
Cloth Hall	Headcorn	Cloth Hall	Late C15-Early 16th century	20 October 1986	TQ8329544254; 51°10′05″N 0°37′13″E	1344312	Cloth Hall More images
Headcorn Manor	Headcorn	House	C20	20 October 1952	TQ8312944229; 51°10′05″N 0°37′05″E	1060835	Upload Photo
Kelsham Farmhouse	Hawkenbury	Farmhouse	17th century	26 April 1968	TQ8145044385; 51°10′12″N 0°35′39″E	1060838	Upload Photo
Godfrey House	Hollingbourne	Timber Framed House	Late 16th century	20 October 1952	TQ8376254773; 51°15′45″N 0°37′57″E	1054873	Godfrey House
Malt House	Hollingbourne	House	1986	20 October 1952	TQ8446655336; 51°16′02″N 0°38′34″E	1344363	Malt House
Barn about 50 Metres South East of Buston Manor	Hunton	Barn	Late 14th century	23 May 1967	TQ7134650908; 51°13′54″N 0°27′10″E	1249915	Barn about 50 Metres South East of Buston Manor More images
Buston Manor	Hunton	House	Late 17th century addition	25 July 1952	TQ7129050959; 51°13′56″N 0°27′07″E	1249912	Buston Manor More images
Granary About 40 Metres South East of Buston Manor	Hunton	Granary	Later 16th century or early 17th century	23 May 1967	TQ7133850921; 51°13′54″N 0°27′10″E	1249914	Granary About 40 Metres South East of Buston Manor More images
Stonewall Farmhouse Mounting Block and Garden Wall to East	Hunton	House	Late 16th century	25 July 1952	TQ7291448954; 51°12′49″N 0°28′28″E	1249763	Stonewall Farmhouse Mounting Block and Garden Wall to East More images
Church of St Mary	Langley	Church	1853-1855	18 December 1985	TQ8052251503; 51°14′03″N 0°35′04″E	1060898	Church of St Mary More images
Langley Corner Farmhouse	Langley	Farmhouse	15th century	20 October 1952	TQ8094251816; 51°14′13″N 0°35′26″E	1068799	Langley Corner Farmhouse More images
Battel Hall	Leeds	Hall House	second quarter 14th century	20 October 1952	TQ8276953308; 51°14′59″N 0°37′03″E	1336303	Battel Hall
Cordwainers	Leeds	Cross Passage House	15th century	26 April 1968	TQ8099553622; 51°15′11″N 0°35′32″E	1185805	Upload Photo
Manor House	Leeds	House	19th century	20 October 1952	TQ8233053165; 51°14′55″N 0°36′40″E	1336304	Manor House More images
Vineys Cottages	Leeds	House	Mid 16th century	20 October 1952	TQ8195152621; 51°14′37″N 0°36′20″E	1336310	Vineys Cottages More images
Corner House, Lenham; Greengrocers, Rebecca's Antiques and Furnishings	Lenham	House	1984	20 October 1952	TQ8986752214; 51°14′15″N 0°43′07″E	1060957	Corner House, Lenham; Greengrocers, Rebecca's Antiques and Furnishings More images
Forge House	Lenham	House	1952	20 October 1952	TQ8996152155; 51°14′13″N 0°43′11″E	1060992	Forge House
Honeywood	Lenham	Jettied House	1621	20 October 1952	TQ8968952047; 51°14′10″N 0°42′57″E	1060976	Honeywood More images
Lenham Court	Lenham	House	Late 16th century	14 December 1984	TQ8841851992; 51°14′10″N 0°41′52″E	1116246	Lenham Court
Royton Manor	Lenham Heath, Lenham	House	late 16th century or early 17th century	26 April 1968	TQ9038850340; 51°13′14″N 0°43′30″E	1060984	Upload Photo
14, 15 and 16, The Square	Lenham	House	Early 18th century	20 October 1952	TQ8992052178; 51°14′14″N 0°43′09″E	1060960	14, 15 and 16, The Square
Church of St Nicholas	Linton	Tower	1860	23 May 1967	TQ7545650144; 51°13′25″N 0°30′41″E	1250235	Church of St Nicholas More images
Church of All Saints	Loose	Church	13th century	23 May 1967	TQ7571752083; 51°14′27″N 0°30′57″E	1263275	Church of All Saints More images
The Wool House and Garden Wall to North and East	Loose	House	Restored 1920s	25 July 1952	TQ7558552090; 51°14′27″N 0°30′51″E	1263154	The Wool House and Garden Wall to North and East More images
Chainhurst Farmhouse	Chainhurst	Farmhouse	Late 16th century	23 May 1967	TQ7309447947; 51°12′16″N 0°28′35″E	1060663	Upload Photo
Great Cheveney House	Marden	Continuous Jetty House	Late 15th century or Early 16th century	23 May 1967	TQ7357842234; 51°09′11″N 0°28′50″E	1055805	Upload Photo
White Lyon House	Marden	House	late 16th century or early 17th century	23 May 1967	TQ7459744593; 51°10′26″N 0°29′47″E	1345537	Upload Photo
Gore Court	Otham	Kitchen	Late 16th century or early 17th century	25 July 1952	TQ7906253261; 51°15′01″N 0°33′52″E	1250699	Upload Photo
Stoneacre and Path between Front Door and Road	Otham	Farmhouse	Formerly	25 July 1952	TQ7998053494; 51°15′08″N 0°34′40″E	1250995	Stoneacre and Path between Front Door and Road More images
Church of St Lawrence	Otterden	Parish Church	1753-59	26 April 1968	TQ9473154184; 51°15′13″N 0°47′21″E	1060964	Church of St Lawrence More images
Otterden Place, and Donkey Wheel attached	Otterden	Country House	Mid 16th century	20 October 1952	TQ9466854202; 51°15′13″N 0°47′18″E	1115729	Otterden Place, and Donkey Wheel attached More images
Exhurst	Staplehurst	Farmhouse	late 14th century or early 15th century	25 March 1987	TQ7984642963; 51°09′28″N 0°34′14″E	1060748	Upload Photo
Hush Heath Manor	Staplehurst	Continuous Jetty House	Early 17th century	25 July 1952	TQ7573040835; 51°08′23″N 0°30′38″E	1045800	Hush Heath Manor More images
Little Harts Heath	Staplehurst	Wealden House	15th century or early 16th century	23 May 1967	TQ7550041190; 51°08′35″N 0°30′27″E	1060730	Little Harts Heath More images
Loddenden Manor	Staplehurst	Continuous Jetty House	Mid-Late 16th century	25 July 1952	TQ7867643368; 51°09′42″N 0°33′14″E	1040054	Upload Photo
Barham Court	Teston	House	1932-1933	25 July 1952	TQ7068453661; 51°15′24″N 0°26′41″E	1251014	Barham Court More images
Church of St Peter and St Paul	Teston	Tower	Pre 1736	23 May 1967	TQ7055153506; 51°15′19″N 0°26′34″E	1251097	Church of St Peter and St Paul More images
Abbey Gate Farmhouse	Tovil	Larder	15th century to 16th century	30 July 1951	TQ7526053653; 51°15′18″N 0°30′37″E	1086289	Upload Photo
Bydews Place	Tovil	House	17th century	30 July 1951	TQ7484154296; 51°15′40″N 0°30′16″E	1075786	Upload Photo
Hayle Mill	Tovil, Maidstone	Mill House	c. 1800	2 August 1974	TQ7559553870; 51°15′25″N 0°30′54″E	1267535	Hayle Mill More images
Kingsnorth Manor Farmhouse	Ulcombe, Maidstone	Farmhouse	Late 16th century	26 April 1968	TQ8485147535; 51°11′50″N 0°38′40″E	1344290	Kingsnorth Manor Farmhouse More images
Benover House	Yalding	Farmhouse	early to mid 16th century	23 May 1967	TQ7046048245; 51°12′29″N 0°26′20″E	1060629	Upload Photo
Burnt Oak	Yalding	House	C20	23 May 1967	TQ7011348684; 51°12′43″N 0°26′03″E	1344428	Burnt Oak More images
Church House	Yalding	House	1887	23 May 1967	TQ6986050113; 51°13′30″N 0°25′52″E	1344038	Church House More images
Court Lodge and the Dairy House	Yalding	Farmhouse	Late 17th century	25 July 1952	TQ6985550207; 51°13′33″N 0°25′52″E	1069066	Court Lodge and the Dairy House More images
Downs Farm House	Yalding	Farmhouse	14th century or early 15th century	23 May 1967	TQ6991250359; 51°13′38″N 0°25′55″E	1348345	Upload Photo
Nightingale Farmhouse	Yalding	Farmhouse	14th century or early 15th century	14 October 1987	TQ6983149231; 51°13′01″N 0°25′49″E	1060627	Upload Photo
Rose Cottages	Yalding	Farmhouse	14th century or early 15th century	23 May 1967	TQ6997550252; 51°13′34″N 0°25′58″E	1348526	Rose Cottages More images
The Normans	Benover, Yalding	Continuous Jetty House	late 16th century early 17th century	13 May 1967	TQ7004348738; 51°12′45″N 0°25′59″E	1115396	The Normans More images
Barming Place	Maidstone	House	Mid 18th century	30 July 1951	TQ7287954663; 51°15′54″N 0°28′36″E	1086294	Upload Photo
Chillington House, Maidstone Museum & Art Gallery	Maidstone	House	1561	30 July 1951	TQ7589556005; 51°16′34″N 0°31′14″E	1222803	Chillington House, Maidstone Museum & Art Gallery More images
Farm Cottages	Maidstone	Wealden House	15th century	30 July 1951	TQ7791554183; 51°15′33″N 0°32′54″E	1266343	Farm Cottages More images
Former Church of St Peter	Maidstone	Church	Converted to secular use	30 July 1951	TQ7559855633; 51°16′22″N 0°30′58″E	1086281	Former Church of St Peter More images
Grove House	Maidstone	House	18th century	30 July 1951	TQ7603056192; 51°16′40″N 0°31′21″E	1266232	Upload Photo
Little Buckland Farm Cottage	Maidstone	End Jetty House	14th century	30 July 1951	TQ7507456732; 51°16′58″N 0°30′32″E	1086397	Upload Photo
Mote House	Mote Park, Maidstone	Country House	1793 and 1801	30 July 1951	TQ7809554991; 51°15′58″N 0°33′05″E	1086313	Mote House More images
Officers Quarters, Maidstone Former Cavalry Barracks	Maidstone	Officers Mess	c1797-1798	2 August 1974	TQ7580856440; 51°16′48″N 0°31′10″E	1225271	Officers Quarters, Maidstone Former Cavalry Barracks More images
Park House	Maidstone	House	1792	2 August 1974	TQ7587757468; 51°17′21″N 0°31′15″E	1086363	Park House
Romney House	Maidstone	House	Early 18th century	30 July 1951	TQ7625555544; 51°16′18″N 0°31′31″E	1086274	Romney House More images
Stone House or the Judges Lodgings	Maidstone	House	Early 18th century	30 July 1951	TQ7621755517; 51°16′18″N 0°31′29″E	1224677	Stone House or the Judges Lodgings More images
The College	Maidstone	Teachers House	14th century	30 July 1951	TQ7600955346; 51°16′12″N 0°31′18″E	1225072	The College More images
The Corpus Christi Hall	Maidstone	Guildhall	1549-1871	30 July 1951	TQ7583055804; 51°16′27″N 0°31′10″E	1086371	The Corpus Christi Hall More images
The Dungeons at the Archbishop's Palace	Maidstone	Cell Block	14th century medieval	30 July 1951	TQ7595255414; 51°16′15″N 0°31′15″E	1086309	Upload Photo
The Old Farmhouse	Maidstone	Farmhouse	15th century	2 August 1974	TQ7558057836; 51°17′33″N 0°31′01″E	1086362	Upload Photo
The Town Hall	Maidstone	Cell Block	1762-3	30 July 1951	TQ7602755718; 51°16′24″N 0°31′20″E	1086305	The Town Hall More images
Turkey Court	Maidstone	Managers House	Mid 18th century	30 July 1951	TQ7719455535; 51°16′17″N 0°32′20″E	1238987	Upload Photo
Willington Place	Maidstone	Jettied House	15th century	30 July 1951	TQ7834054050; 51°15′28″N 0°33′16″E	1266284	Willington Place More images
11 Lower Stone Street	Maidstone	House	Early 18th century	30 July 1951	TQ7623155550; 51°16′19″N 0°31′30″E	1086332	11 Lower Stone Street
70 Lower Stone Street	Maidstone	Jettied House	15th century	30 July 1951	TQ7624455399; 51°16′14″N 0°31′30″E	1336227	70 Lower Stone Street More images
85 Bank Street	Maidstone	Shop	Early 19th century	30 July 1951	TQ7601755688; 51°16′23″N 0°31′19″E	1086357	85 Bank Street
8 and 9 High Street	Maidstone	Wetherspoons	1827	30 July 1951	TQ7603255757; 51°16′26″N 0°31′20″E	1223181	8 and 9 High Street More images
78 Bank Street	Maidstone	House	18th century	30 July 1951	TQ7598855669; 51°16′23″N 0°31′18″E	1266847	Upload Photo
The Queen's Own Royal West Kent Regiment Cenotaph	Brenchley Gardens, Maidstone	War memorial	1921	2 August 1974	TQ7588756128; 51°16′38″N 0°31′13″E	1086395	The Queen's Own Royal West Kent Regiment Cenotaph More images
Mansion Farmhouse	Ulcombe	House	17th century	26 April 1968	TQ8585048954; 51°12′34″N 0°39′34″E	1060889	Upload Photo

== See also ==
- Grade I listed buildings in Maidstone
- List of scheduled monuments in Maidstone
