= Hollingbourne Rural District =

Former local government area in the UK

Coordinates: 51°14′N 0°40′E

Hollingbourne
- History
  - Created: 1894
  - Abolished: 1974
  - Succeeded by: Maidstone
- Status: Rural district

Hollingbourne Rural District was a rural district in the county of Kent, England. It was named after the village of Hollingbourne.

Following the Local Government Act 1972, on 1 April 1974 the district was merged with Maidstone Rural District to form the Borough of Maidstone.

== Civil parishes ==
At the time of its dissolution it consisted of the following civil parishes to the east and southeast of Maidstone:

- Bicknor
- Boughton Malherbe
- Boxley
- Bredhurst (part transferred to Gillingham Borough Council in 1933)
- Broomfield and Kingswood
- Chart Sutton
- Detling
- East Sutton
- Frinsted
- Harrietsham
- Headcorn
- Hollingbourne
- Hucking
- Langley
- Leeds
- Lenham
- Otterden
- Stockbury
- Sutton Valence
- Thurnham
- Ulcombe
- Wichling
- Wormshill

== See also ==
- Hollingbourne Station
- Hollingbourne Downs
- Mills on Hollingbourne Stream
