= Kingswood, Kent =

Village in Kent, England

Coordinates: 51.225286°N 0.635555°E

Kingswood
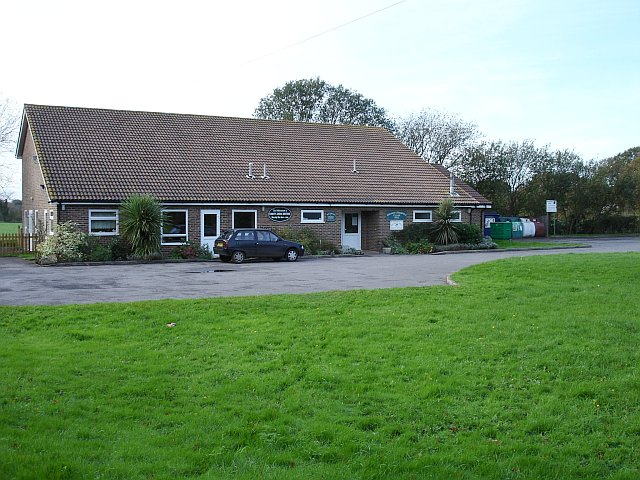
- Village hall

- Location within Kent
- OS grid reference: TQ 837513
- District: Maidstone
- Shire county: Kent
- Region: South East
- Country: England
- Sovereign state: United Kingdom
- Post town: MAIDSTONE
- Postcode district: ME17
- Dialling code: 01622
- Police: Kent
- Fire: Kent
- Ambulance: South East Coast
- UK Parliament: Faversham and Mid Kent

Kingswood is a village in the Maidstone District of Kent, England and forms part of the civil parish of Broomfield and Kingswood.

The main village was constructed in the early 1960s, after earlier sporadic development in both Pitt and Gravelly Bottom Roads on land given to soldiers returning from WW1. Kingswood is situated to the south of the more ancient village of Broomfield. The village has a single village shop/post office but no public house. An annual senior citizen outing is arranged by the parish council and paid for from the village precept.

The woods surrounding the village has three large craters often mistakenly attributed to World War II bombs; the origin of the craters is unknown.
