= Listed buildings in Wichling =

Civil Parish in Kent, England

Wichling is a village and civil parish in the Borough of Maidstone of Kent, England It contains five grade II listed buildings that are recorded in the National Heritage List for England.

This list is based on the information retrieved online from Historic England.

== Key ==
Grade	Criteria
I	Buildings that are of exceptional interest
II*	Particularly important buildings of more than special interest
II	Buildings that are of special interest

== Listing ==
Name	Grade	Location	Type	Completed (Note: The date given is the date used by Historic England as significant for the initial building or that of an important part in the structure's description.)	Date designated	Grid ref. (Note: The grid reference is based on the British national grid reference system, sometimes known as OSGB36, used by the Ordnance Survey.) Geo-coordinates	Notes	Entry number (Note: The "List Entry Number" is a unique number assigned to each listed building and scheduled monument by Historic England.)	Image	Wikidata
Church of St Margaret	II	Lenham Road	church building		26 April 1968	TQ9155155768; 51°16′08″N 0°44′40″E		1060969	Church of St Margaret More images	Q26314110
Lone Barn at Tq 912 548	II	Lenham Road			14 December 1984	TQ9118254808; 51°15′37″N 0°44′19″E		1060982	Upload Photo	Q26314122
Stapleton	II	Lenham Road			14 December 1984	TQ9250456601; 51°16′34″N 0°45′31″E		1320328	Upload Photo	Q26606339
Wichling Court	II	Lenham Road			14 December 1984	TQ9196456104; 51°16′18″N 0°45′02″E		1320359	Upload Photo	Q26606364
Wychling House	II	Lenham Road			26 April 1968	TQ9143354924; 51°15′41″N 0°44′32″E		1344252	Upload Photo	Q26627990

== See also ==
- Grade I listed buildings in Kent
- Grade II* listed buildings in Kent

== Sources ==
- Newman, John (2012) [1969], Kent: West and the Weald, The Buildings of England, New Haven and London: Yale University Press, ISBN 978-0-300-18509-6
