= Listed buildings in Chart Sutton =

Historic structures in Kent, England

Chart Sutton is a village and civil parish in the Borough of Maidstone of Kent, England It contains two grade II* and 37 grade II listed buildings that are recorded in the National Heritage List for England.

This list is based on the information retrieved online from Historic England.

== Key ==
Grade	Criteria
I	Buildings that are of exceptional interest
II*	Particularly important buildings of more than special interest
II	Buildings that are of special interest

== Listing ==
Name	Grade	Location	Type	Completed (Note: The date given is the date used by Historic England as significant for the initial building or that of an important part in the structure's description.)	Date designated	Grid ref. (Note: The grid reference is based on the British national grid reference system, sometimes known as OSGB36, used by the Ordnance Survey.) Geo-coordinates	Notes	Entry number (Note: The "List Entry Number" is a unique number assigned to each listed building and scheduled monument by Historic England.)	Image	Wikidata
Marshalls Place	II	Amber Lane			11 November 1975	TQ7937050303; 51°13′25″N 0°34′02″E		1060944	Upload Photo	Q26314089
Old Amber Green Farmhouse	II	Amber Lane			16 June 1975	TQ7897850355; 51°13′28″N 0°33′42″E		1100333	Upload Photo	Q26392456
Ashurst Farmhouse	II	Ashurst Court Road			18 December 1985	TQ7992246994; 51°11′38″N 0°34′25″E		1344279	Upload Photo	Q26628015
Ashurst Lodge Farmhouse	II	Ashurst Court Road			21 June 1978	TQ7998647298; 51°11′48″N 0°34′29″E		1348509	Upload Photo	Q26631885
Little Ashurst	II	Ashurst Court Road			26 April 1968	TQ7991447336; 51°11′49″N 0°34′25″E		1060945	Upload Photo	Q26314090
Oasthouse Range About 17 Metres East North East of Ashurst Court	II	Ashurst Court Road			18 December 1985	TQ7981246939; 51°11′36″N 0°34′19″E		1347902	Upload Photo	Q26631323
House Attached to North of Post Office Stores	II	Chart Corner			18 December 1985	TQ7964750348; 51°13′27″N 0°34′17″E		1347900	Upload Photo	Q26631321
Barn About 24 Metres South West of Elderden Farmhouse	II	Chart Hill Road			18 December 1985	TQ7889347102; 51°11′42″N 0°33′32″E		1347886	Upload Photo	Q26631308
Dunbury Farmhouse	II*	Chart Hill Road			18 December 1985	TQ7916246288; 51°11′16″N 0°33′44″E		1060947	Upload Photo	Q17545044
Elderden Farmhouse	II	Chart Hill Road			18 December 1985	TQ7894747112; 51°11′43″N 0°33′35″E		1060946	Upload Photo	Q26314091
Heronden	II	Chart Hill Road			26 April 1968	TQ7920249338; 51°12′54″N 0°33′52″E		1344281	Upload Photo	Q26628017
Hertsfield Bridges	II*	Chart Hill Road			25 July 1952	TQ7825046762; 51°11′32″N 0°32′58″E		1060786	Hertsfield Bridges More images	Q17545007
Ivy Cottage	II	Chart Hill Road			18 December 1985	TQ7956649495; 51°12′59″N 0°34′11″E		1101511	Upload Photo	Q26395013
Ladds Court	II	Chart Hill Road			26 April 1968	TQ7961549532; 51°13′00″N 0°34′14″E		1344280	Upload Photo	Q26628016
Chart Place	II	Church Road			20 October 1952	TQ8038749457; 51°12′57″N 0°34′53″E		1344282	Upload Photo	Q26628018
Chart Place Cottages	II	Church Road			26 April 1968	TQ8043849483; 51°12′58″N 0°34′56″E		1347780	Upload Photo	Q26631208
Church of St Michael	II	Church Road			26 April 1968	TQ8043949414; 51°12′55″N 0°34′56″E		1060948	Church of St Michael More images	Q26314092
Court Farmhouse and Barn	II	Church Road			26 April 1968	TQ8045849483; 51°12′58″N 0°34′57″E		1060949	Upload Photo	Q26314093
Former Granary About 15 Metres North of Chart Place Cottages	II	Church Road			26 April 1968	TQ8044549507; 51°12′58″N 0°34′56″E		1101729	Upload Photo	Q26395470
Mounting Block About 20 Metres West North West of Church of St Michael	II	Church Road			18 December 1985	TQ8040049424; 51°12′56″N 0°34′54″E		1101741	Upload Photo	Q26395497
Norton Court	II	Church Road			18 December 1985	TQ8020650122; 51°13′19″N 0°34′45″E		1060950	Upload Photo	Q26314094
Barn About 2 1/2 Metres South West of Chart Hall Farmhouse	II	Green Lane			18 December 1985	TQ7900448031; 51°12′12″N 0°33′39″E		1083584	Upload Photo	Q26365812
Chart Hall Farmhouse	II	Green Lane			26 April 1968	TQ7902448038; 51°12′13″N 0°33′41″E		1344283	Upload Photo	Q26628019
Lake Farmhouse	II	Green Lane			18 December 1985	TQ7953747582; 51°11′57″N 0°34′06″E		1344284	Upload Photo	Q26628020
White House Farmhouse	II	Green Lane			26 April 1968	TQ7927647977; 51°12′10″N 0°33′53″E		1060951	Upload Photo	Q26314095
Lucks Cottage	II	Lucks Lane			18 December 1985	TQ7866748863; 51°12′40″N 0°33′24″E		1060912	Upload Photo	Q26314061
Old Farmhouse, Moat Farm	II	Moat Farm, Green Lane			26 April 1968	TQ7971547815; 51°12′05″N 0°34′16″E		1101736	Upload Photo	Q26395485
Wentways	II	Norton Road			18 December 1985	TQ8028750204; 51°13′21″N 0°34′49″E		1344304	Upload Photo	Q26628039
Barns and Outbuildings to North East of Fir Tree Farmhouse	II	Plough Wents Road			18 December 1985	TQ8026350666; 51°13′36″N 0°34′49″E		1060914	Upload Photo	Q26314063
Garage at Fir Tree Farmhouse	II	Plough Wents Road			18 December 1985	TQ8023250650; 51°13′36″N 0°34′47″E		1259305	Upload Photo	Q26550436
Lested Lodge	II	Plough Wents Road			18 December 1985	TQ7960350437; 51°13′30″N 0°34′15″E		1060913	Upload Photo	Q26314062
Newhouse Farmhouse	II	Plough Wents Road			18 December 1985	TQ8010850586; 51°13′34″N 0°34′41″E		1344305	Upload Photo	Q26628040
Oasthouse About 17 Metres East of Fir Tree Farmhouse	II	Plough Wents Road			18 December 1985	TQ8028050642; 51°13′35″N 0°34′50″E		1060915	Upload Photo	Q26314064
The Moorings	II	Plough Wents Road			18 December 1985	TQ7966250403; 51°13′28″N 0°34′18″E		1060916	Upload Photo	Q26314065
Barn About 40 Metres South South West of Park House Farmhouse	II	Rectory Lane			18 December 1985	TQ8025349039; 51°12′44″N 0°34′46″E		1338869	Upload Photo	Q26623155
Priory House	II	Rectory Lane			18 December 1985	TQ8051948949; 51°12′40″N 0°34′59″E		1060919	Upload Photo	Q26314068
Rectory Farmhouse	II	Rectory Lane			18 December 1985	TQ8034849033; 51°12′43″N 0°34′50″E		1060918	Upload Photo	Q26314067
Stable to South of Rectory Farmhouse	II	Rectory Lane			5 September 1995	TQ8034248999; 51°12′42″N 0°34′50″E		1251116	Upload Photo	Q26543112
Sutton Platt Cottage	II	Rectory Lane			18 December 1985	TQ8034049114; 51°12′46″N 0°34′50″E		1060917	Upload Photo	Q26314066

== See also ==
- Grade I listed buildings in Kent
- Grade II* listed buildings in Kent

== Sources ==
- Newman, John (2012) [1969], Kent: West and the Weald, The Buildings of England, New Haven and London: Yale University Press, ISBN 978-0-300-18509-6
