= Marley, Maidstone =

Hamlet in Kent, England

Coordinates: 51°14′37″N 0°41′10″E

Marley is a hamlet in the civil parish of Harrietsham that, in turn, forms part of the district of Maidstone in the English county of Kent.
