= Listed buildings in Langley, Kent =

Historic budlings in Kent, England

Langley is a village and civil parish in the Borough of Maidstone of Kent, England It contains two grade II* and 15 grade II listed buildings that are recorded in the National Heritage List for England.

This list is based on the information retrieved online from Historic England.

== Key ==
| Grade | Criteria |
|---|---|
| I | Buildings that are of exceptional interest |
| II* | Particularly important buildings of more than special interest |
| II | Buildings that are of special interest |

== Listing ==
| Name | Grade | Location | Type | Completed (Note: The date given is the date used by Historic England as significant for the initial building or that of an important part in the structure's description.) | Date designated | Grid ref. (Note: The grid reference is based on the British national grid reference system, sometimes known as OSGB36, used by the Ordnance Survey.) Geo-coordinates | Notes | Entry number (Note: The "List Entry Number" is a unique number assigned to each listed building and scheduled monument by Historic England.) | Image | Wikidata |
|---|---|---|---|---|---|---|---|---|---|---|
| Langley Lodge | II | Chartway Street | | | 18 December 1985 | TQ8185450245; 51°13′21″N 0°36′10″E | | 1068739 | Upload Photo | Q26321434 |
| The Old Farmhouse | II | Green Lane | | | 18 December 1985 | TQ8108051386; 51°13′59″N 0°35′32″E | | 1060907 | Upload Photo | Q26314056 |
| Ye Olde Cottage | II | Green Lane | | | 26 April 1968 | TQ8105351411; 51°13′59″N 0°35′31″E | | 1344301 | Upload Photo | Q26628036 |
| Langley Corner Farmhouse | II* | Horseshoe Lane | | | 20 October 1952 | TQ8094251816; 51°14′13″N 0°35′26″E | | 1068799 | Langley Corner Farmhouse More images | Q17545089 |
| Barn to the Northwest of Redpit | II | Leeds Road | | | 24 June 2002 | TQ8125651387; 51°13′58″N 0°35′42″E | | 1360801 | Upload Photo | Q26642857 |
| Turkey Cottage | II | Leeds Road | | | 26 March 1990 | TQ8148451769; 51°14′10″N 0°35′54″E | | 1251107 | Upload Photo | Q26543104 |
| The Plough Inn | II | Maidstone Road | | | 15 March 1983 | TQ8083950879; 51°13′42″N 0°35′19″E | | 1060873 | Upload Photo | Q26314023 |
| Rumwood Court | II | New Road | | | 26 April 1968 | TQ7997852227; 51°14′27″N 0°34′37″E | | 1060892 | Upload Photo | Q26314042 |
| Barn About 30 Metres West South West of Langley Park Farmhouse | II | Sutton Road | | | 18 December 1985 | TQ7985851646; 51°14′08″N 0°34′30″E | | 1060894 | Upload Photo | Q26314044 |
| Barn Or Granary About 25 Metres West South West of Langley Park Farmhouse | II | Sutton Road | | | 18 December 1985 | TQ7987351645; 51°14′08″N 0°34′31″E | | 1060893 | Upload Photo | Q26314043 |
| Cattle Sheds and Stables About 25 Metres North West of Langley Park Farmhouse | II | Sutton Road | | | 18 December 1985 | TQ7986551683; 51°14′10″N 0°34′30″E | | 1060895 | Upload Photo | Q26314045 |
| Church of St Mary | II* | Sutton Road | | | 18 December 1985 | TQ8052251503; 51°14′03″N 0°35′04″E | | 1060898 | Church of St Mary More images | Q17545029 |
| Langley Park Farmhouse | II | Sutton Road | | | 26 April 1968 | TQ7991451651; 51°14′08″N 0°34′33″E | | 1344294 | Upload Photo | Q26628029 |
| Langley School and School Master's House (sunrise Nursery and Pre-prep School) | II | Sutton Road | | | 18 December 1985 | TQ8052051534; 51°14′04″N 0°35′04″E | | 1060897 | Upload Photo | Q26314047 |
| Rectory Farmhouse | II | Sutton Road | | | 18 December 1985 | TQ8065951073; 51°13′49″N 0°35′10″E | | 1344293 | Upload Photo | Q26628028 |
| The Old Rectory | II | Sutton Road | | | 18 December 1985 | TQ8059451145; 51°13′51″N 0°35′07″E | | 1344295 | The Old Rectory More images | Q26628030 |
| Tile Barn | II | Sutton Road | | | 18 December 1985 | TQ8016652049; 51°14′21″N 0°34′47″E | | 1060896 | Upload Photo | Q26314046 |

== See also ==
- Grade I listed buildings in Kent
- Grade II* listed buildings in Kent

== Sources ==
- Newman, John (2012) [1969], Kent: West and the Weald, The Buildings of England, New Haven and London: Yale University Press, ISBN 978-0-300-18509-6
