= Listed buildings in Harrietsham =

Historic structures in Kent, England

Harrietsham is a village and civil parish in the Borough of Maidstone of Kent, England It contains two grade I, three grade II* and 61 grade II listed buildings that are recorded in the National Heritage List for England.

This list is based on the information retrieved online from Historic England.

== Key ==
Grade	Criteria
I	Buildings that are of exceptional interest
II*	Particularly important buildings of more than special interest
II	Buildings that are of special interest

== Listing ==
Name	Grade	Location	Type	Completed (Note: The date given is the date used by Historic England as significant for the initial building or that of an important part in the structure's description.)	Date designated	Grid ref. (Note: The grid reference is based on the British national grid reference system, sometimes known as OSGB36, used by the Ordnance Survey.) Geo-coordinates	Notes	Entry number (Note: The "List Entry Number" is a unique number assigned to each listed building and scheduled monument by Historic England.)	Image	Wikidata
Church of St John the Baptist	I				26 April 1968	TQ8748553006; 51°14′43″N 0°41′05″E		1336289	Church of St John the Baptist More images	Q7593721
Headstone Body Stone and Footstone to Martha Knight Circa 18 Yards South of West Tower of Church of St John the Baptist	II				14 December 1984	TQ8746652987; 51°14′43″N 0°41′04″E		1299807	Upload Photo	Q95628683
Headstone to John Hunt and John Stevens Circa 3 Yards East of Chancel of Church of St John the Baptist	II				14 December 1984	TQ8750853001; 51°14′43″N 0°41′07″E		1336290	Upload Photo	Q95628682
Headstone, Bodystone and Footstone to John Knight Circa 15 Yards South of West Tower of Church of St John the Baptist	II				14 December 1984	TQ8746752989; 51°14′43″N 0°41′04″E		1086180	Upload Photo	Q95628687
Table Tomb Circa 6 Yards East of Chancel of Church of St John the Baptist	II				14 December 1984	TQ8751253001; 51°14′43″N 0°41′07″E		1336291	Upload Photo	Q95628681
Table Tomb to Elizabeth Weeks Circa 13 Yards South of West Tower of Church of St John the Baptist	II				14 December 1984	TQ8746852991; 51°14′43″N 0°41′04″E		1185138	Upload Photo	Q95628684
Table Tomb to Mrs Elizabeth Barrow 2 Yards South of South Porch of Church of St John the Baptist	II				14 December 1984	TQ8747552991; 51°14′43″N 0°41′05″E		1086179	Upload Photo	Q95628688
Table Tomb to Thomas Knight, Gent., Circa 10 Yards South of West Tower of Church of St John the Baptist	II				14 December 1984	TQ8746952996; 51°14′43″N 0°41′05″E		1086181	Upload Photo	Q95628685
Fir Cottage	II	Chegworth Road			26 April 1968	TQ8504952863; 51°14′42″N 0°39′00″E		1185145	Upload Photo	Q26480458
Court Lodge Farm House	II	Church Road			26 April 1968	TQ8728853050; 51°14′45″N 0°40′55″E		1336292	Upload Photo	Q26620793
Gazebo Cum Boathouse at Tq872 529	II*	Church Road			26 April 1968	TQ8711452953; 51°14′42″N 0°40′46″E		1185158	Upload Photo	Q17545191
Lake Cottage	II	Church Road			26 April 1968	TQ8703852864; 51°14′39″N 0°40′42″E		1086182	Upload Photo	Q26376092
Almshouses and Handrails and Garden Walls Attached	II	1 and 2, East Street			20 October 1952	TQ8716952407; 51°14′24″N 0°40′48″E		1185186	Upload Photo	Q26480497
Anglesey Cottage Chulmleigh Chulmleigh Cottage	II	East Street			26 April 1968	TQ8713252423; 51°14′25″N 0°40′46″E		1336293	Upload Photo	Q26620794
Autumn Cottage	II	East Street			14 December 1984	TQ8707252452; 51°14′26″N 0°40′43″E		1086183	Upload Photo	Q26376098
Barn About 18 Metres South of Bell Farm House	II	East Street, ME17 1HJ			14 December 1984	TQ8715952372; 51°14′23″N 0°40′47″E		1086146	Upload Photo	Q26375948
Bell Farm House	I	East Street, ME17 1HJ			20 October 1952	TQ8713052394; 51°14′24″N 0°40′46″E		1086145	Bell Farm House More images	Q7754855
Bell House	II	East Street, ME17 1HJ			26 April 1968	TQ8709852417; 51°14′25″N 0°40′44″E		1086144	Upload Photo	Q26375942
Borden Cottages	II	1 and 2, East Street			14 December 1984	TQ8717052356; 51°14′23″N 0°40′48″E		1086147	Upload Photo	Q26375954
Cherry Tree Farmhouse	II	East Street			14 December 1984	TQ8720252360; 51°14′23″N 0°40′50″E		1086143	Upload Photo	Q26375937
Front Garden Wall to Almshouses, Beginning and Ending Circa 2 Yards South East of Almshouses	II	East Street			14 December 1984	TQ8716152393; 51°14′24″N 0°40′48″E		1336312	Upload Photo	Q26620810
Garden Wall in 2 Sections Enclosing Approximately 1 Acre of Land Immediately to Rear of Almshouses	II	East Street			14 December 1984	TQ8720252465; 51°14′26″N 0°40′50″E		1086142	Upload Photo	Q26375932
Malthouse	II	East Street			14 December 1984	TQ8704652442; 51°14′26″N 0°40′42″E		1336313	Upload Photo	Q26620811
Red Barn Red Barn Cottage	II	East Street			14 December 1984	TQ8718052290; 51°14′21″N 0°40′48″E		1086148	Upload Photo	Q26375959
Row of 8 Sheds Circa 2 Yards North North East of Almshouses	II	East Street			14 December 1984	TQ8716552422; 51°14′25″N 0°40′48″E		1086141	Upload Photo	Q26375925
1 Fairbourne Manor Cottages Lilliput Cottage	II	1 Fairbourne Manor Cottages, Fairbourne Lane			14 December 1984	TQ8619751328; 51°13′51″N 0°39′56″E		1185335	Upload Photo	Q26480652
Barn Circa 4 Yards East of Fairbourne Manor	II	Fairbourne Lane			14 December 1984	TQ8614351240; 51°13′48″N 0°39′53″E		1086149	Upload Photo	Q26375964
Barn Circa 6 Yards West of 1 Fairbourne Manor Cottages and Lilliput Cottage	II	Fairbourne Lane			14 December 1984	TQ8616851323; 51°13′51″N 0°39′54″E		1086150	Upload Photo	Q26375968
Barn at Tq 861 515 (circa 36 Yards West South West of Fairbourne Court)	II	Fairbourne Lane			14 December 1984	TQ8611151448; 51°13′55″N 0°39′52″E		1185360	Upload Photo	Q26480676
Fairbourne Court	II	Fairbourne Lane			26 April 1968	TQ8623151459; 51°13′55″N 0°39′58″E		1336315	Upload Photo	Q26620813
Fairbourne Manor	II	Fairbourne Lane			14 December 1984	TQ8611651255; 51°13′48″N 0°39′52″E		1185255	Upload Photo	Q26480569
Fairbourne Mill	II	Fairbourne Lane			14 December 1984	TQ8653951765; 51°14′04″N 0°40′14″E		1086151	Upload Photo	Q26375973
Fairbourne Oast	II	Fairbourne Lane			14 December 1984	TQ8657851818; 51°14′06″N 0°40′16″E		1185353	Upload Photo	Q26480668
Mill House	II	Fairbourne Lane			14 December 1984	TQ8655451832; 51°14′07″N 0°40′15″E		1299686	Upload Photo	Q26587060
Oast Circa 6.5 Yards North East of Fairbourne Mill	II	Fairbourne Lane			14 December 1984	TQ8656551777; 51°14′05″N 0°40′16″E		1299712	Upload Photo	Q26587082
Ramchild	II	Fairbourne Lane			14 December 1984	TQ8641752216; 51°14′19″N 0°40′09″E		1086152	Upload Photo	Q26375980
Water Mill Circa 4 Yards South of Mill House	II	Fairbourne Lane			14 December 1984	TQ8655851820; 51°14′06″N 0°40′15″E		1336314	Upload Photo	Q26620812
Goddington House	II	Goddington Lane			14 December 1984	TQ8611253247; 51°14′53″N 0°39′55″E		1086153	Upload Photo	Q26375986
Greenhills	II	Greenhills			18 January 1995	TQ8525253331; 51°14′57″N 0°39′11″E		1261922	Upload Photo	Q26552833
Barn About 10 Metres South West of Greenway Forstal Farmhouse	II	Greenway Court Road, Hollingbourne			21 October 1986	TQ8510253388; 51°14′59″N 0°39′03″E		1344360	Upload Photo	Q26628090
Barn Circa 30 Yards South West of Greenway Forstall Farmhouse	II	Greenway Forstal			14 December 1984	TQ8510953384; 51°14′58″N 0°39′04″E		1336276	Upload Photo	Q26620783
Greenway Forstal Farmhouse	II*	Greenway Forstal			26 April 1968	TQ8513253415; 51°14′59″N 0°39′05″E		1299691	Greenway Forstal Farmhouse More images	Q17545336
Dial House, Handrails Attached and Cottage to Left	II	Handrails Attached And Cottage To Left, East Street			26 April 1968	TQ8709252446; 51°14′26″N 0°40′44″E		1185178	Upload Photo	Q26480488
Holm Mill House	II	Holm Mill Lane			14 December 1984	TQ8561652907; 51°14′42″N 0°39′29″E		1086154	Upload Photo	Q26375990
Barn 1.5 Yards North East of Pollhill Mill	II	Pollhill			14 December 1984	TQ8608652286; 51°14′22″N 0°39′52″E		1185437	Upload Photo	Q26480753
Little Poll Pollhill	II	Pollhill			26 April 1968	TQ8607952325; 51°14′23″N 0°39′52″E		1185396	Upload Photo	Q26480711
Pollhill Mill	II	Pollhill			14 December 1984	TQ8607052275; 51°14′22″N 0°39′51″E		1086155	Upload Photo	Q26375995
Brenchleys Little Brenchleys	II	Rectory Lane			26 April 1968	TQ8720652389; 51°14′24″N 0°40′50″E		1336277	Upload Photo	Q26620784
Barn Circa 67 Yards North of Stede Hill	II	Stede Hill			26 April 1968	TQ8784753956; 51°15′14″N 0°41′26″E		1185443	Upload Photo	Q26480759
Harrietsham Manor	II*	Stede Hill			14 December 1984	TQ8785054210; 51°15′22″N 0°41′26″E		1086156	Upload Photo	Q17545102
Lower Dean's Farm Cottages	II	1 and 2, Stede Hill			14 December 1984	TQ8721954510; 51°15′32″N 0°40′55″E		1336278	Upload Photo	Q26620785
Lower Dean's Farmhouse	II	Stede Hill			26 April 1968	TQ8714754573; 51°15′35″N 0°40′51″E		1366086	Upload Photo	Q26647718
30, West Street	II	30, West Street, ME17 1HX			14 December 1984	TQ8672252730; 51°14′35″N 0°40′26″E		1336279	Upload Photo	Q26620786
32, West Street	II	32, West Street, ME17 1HX			26 April 1968	TQ8673552731; 51°14′35″N 0°40′26″E		1185533	Upload Photo	Q26480851
42, West Street	II	42, West Street			14 December 1984	TQ8678452695; 51°14′34″N 0°40′29″E		1086158	Upload Photo	Q26376008
46-50, West Street	II	46-50, West Street			14 December 1984	TQ8678952679; 51°14′34″N 0°40′29″E		1185538	Upload Photo	Q26480855
6 and 8, West Street	II	6 and 8, West Street			4 January 1984	TQ8660052767; 51°14′37″N 0°40′19″E		1086157	Upload Photo	Q26376002
62, West Street	II	62, West Street			14 December 1984	TQ8680452650; 51°14′33″N 0°40′30″E		1086159	Upload Photo	Q26376012
Clare Cottage	II	27, West Street			14 December 1984	TQ8660452748; 51°14′36″N 0°40′20″E		1336280	Upload Photo	Q26620787
Percival's Rest	II	West Street, ME17 1HX			14 December 1984	TQ8674752675; 51°14′34″N 0°40′27″E		1185543	Upload Photo	Q26480861
The Quest	II	West Street			26 April 1968	TQ8653752766; 51°14′37″N 0°40′16″E		1185519	Upload Photo	Q26480836

== See also ==
- Grade I listed buildings in Kent
- Grade II* listed buildings in Kent

== Sources ==
- Newman, John (2012) [1969], Kent: West and the Weald, The Buildings of England, New Haven and London: Yale University Press, ISBN 978-0-300-18509-6
