= Maidstone Rural District =

Former district in Kent, England

Coordinates: 51°14′N 0°29′E

Maidstone
- History
  - Created: 1894
  - Abolished: 1974
  - Succeeded by: Maidstone
- Status: Rural district

Maidstone Rural District was a rural district in the county of Kent, England. It lay to the south of the town and municipal borough of Maidstone.

Following the Local Government Act 1972, on 1 April 1974 the district was merged with the municipal borough and Hollingbourne Rural District to form the Borough of Maidstone.

== Civil parishes ==
At the time of its dissolution it consisted of the following civil parishes to the south, southwest and southeast of Maidstone:

- Barming (created 1934)
- Bearsted
- Boughton Monchelsea
- Coxheath
- East Barming (abolished to create Barming CP in 1934)
- East Farleigh
- Hunton
- Linton
- Loose
- Marden
- Nettlestead
- Otham (included Downswood)
- Staplehurst
- West Barming (abolished to create Barming CP in 1934)
- West Farleigh
- Yalding (included Collier Street)
