= Listed buildings in Broomfield and Kingswood =

Civil Parish in Kent, England

Broomfield and Kingswood is a village and civil parish in the Borough of Maidstone of Kent, England It contains two grade I, one grade II* and 14 grade II listed buildings that are recorded in the National Heritage List for England.

This list is based on the information retrieved online from Historic England.

== Key ==
Grade	Criteria
I	Buildings that are of exceptional interest
II*	Particularly important buildings of more than special interest
II	Buildings that are of special interest

== Listing ==
Name	Grade	Location	Type	Completed (Note: The date given is the date used by Historic England as significant for the initial building or that of an important part in the structure's description.)	Date designated	Grid ref. (Note: The grid reference is based on the British national grid reference system, sometimes known as OSGB36, used by the Ordnance Survey.) Geo-coordinates	Notes	Entry number (Note: The "List Entry Number" is a unique number assigned to each listed building and scheduled monument by Historic England.)	Image	Wikidata
Leeds Castle	I				20 October 1952	TQ8367353274; 51°14′57″N 0°37′49″E		1039919	Leeds Castle More images	Q746876
Ruins of Barbicans and Dam at Leeds Castle	I				18 December 1985	TQ8354153193; 51°14′54″N 0°37′43″E		1060933	Ruins of Barbicans and Dam at Leeds Castle More images	Q58822972
Park Barn Farmhouse	II				26 April 1968	TQ8309052128; 51°14′20″N 0°37′17″E		1060934	Upload Photo	Q26314080
The Old Forge	II	Ashford Road			18 December 1985	TQ8434353230; 51°14′54″N 0°38′24″E		1060935	Upload Photo	Q26314081
The Park Gate Inn	II	Ashford Road			18 December 1985	TQ8385353730; 51°15′11″N 0°38′00″E		1060936	Upload Photo	Q26314082
Chartway Cottage	II	Chartway Street			18 December 1985	TQ8361550303; 51°13′21″N 0°37′41″E		1060937	Upload Photo	Q26314083
Barn About 15 Metres East of Church Farmhouse	II	Lower Broomfield Road			18 December 1985	TQ8387352441; 51°14′29″N 0°37′58″E		1100318	Upload Photo	Q26392429
Barrack Cottages	II	Lower Broomfield Road			26 April 1968	TQ8389452514; 51°14′32″N 0°37′59″E		1060943	Upload Photo	Q26314088
Church Farmhouse	II	Lower Broomfield Road			26 April 1968	TQ8385552452; 51°14′30″N 0°37′57″E		1344277	Upload Photo	Q26628013
Church of St Margaret	II*	Lower Broomfield Road			26 April 1968	TQ8400152495; 51°14′31″N 0°38′05″E		1060942	Church of St Margaret More images	Q17545038
Gatehouse and Gate Pier to North Side of Entrance to Leeds Castle Grounds	II	Lower Broomfield Road			18 December 1985	TQ8416553154; 51°14′52″N 0°38′15″E		1344278	Upload Photo	Q26628014
Gatehouse and Gate Pier to South Side of Entrance to Leeds Castle Grounds	II	Lower Broomfield Road			18 December 1985	TQ8416353137; 51°14′52″N 0°38′14″E		1100331	Upload Photo	Q26392454
Vine Cottage	II	1 and 2, Lower Broomfield Road			26 April 1968	TQ8386952487; 51°14′31″N 0°37′58″E		1100323	Upload Photo	Q26392437
Great Ivy Cottage	II	Upper Street, Broomfield, ME17 1PS			18 December 1985	TQ8379852292; 51°14′25″N 0°37′54″E		1060938	Upload Photo	Q26314084
Roses Manor Farm	II	Upper Street, Broomfield, ME17 1PS			26 April 1968	TQ8381952315; 51°14′25″N 0°37′55″E		1060939	Upload Photo	Q26314085
Roses Oast	II	Upper Street, Broomfield, ME17 1PS			18 December 1985	TQ8385152324; 51°14′26″N 0°37′57″E		1060941	Upload Photo	Q26314087
Westlea Barn and Fairview Barn	II	Upper Street, Broomfield, ME17 1PS			18 December 1985	TQ8383152340; 51°14′26″N 0°37′56″E		1060940	Upload Photo	Q26314086

== See also ==
- Grade I listed buildings in Kent
- Grade II* listed buildings in Kent

== Sources ==
- Newman, John (2012) [1969], Kent: West and the Weald, The Buildings of England, New Haven and London: Yale University Press, ISBN 978-0-300-18509-6
