= Maidstone Town Hall =

Municipal building in Maidstone, Kent, England

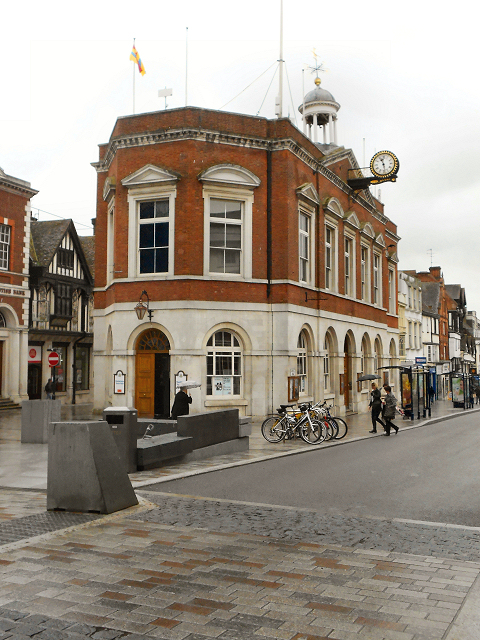
- Maidstone Town Hall in 2013

- Shown in Kent
- 51.2734°N 0.5221°E
- Location: Middle Row, Maidstone

History
- Built: 1763

Site notes
- Architectural style: Neoclassical style

Listed Building – Grade II*
- Official name: The Town Hall
- Designated: 30 July 1951
- Reference no.: 1086305

Maidstone Town Hall is a municipal building in Middle Row, Maidstone, Kent, England. The town hall, which is a meeting place of Maidstone Borough Council, is a Grade II* listed building.

== History ==
The first courthouse in the town was erected, for the purposes of hearings of the quarter sessions and assizes, in the Middle Row in 1587. Civic leaders held their meetings in a room on the first floor. In 1608, a second courthouse, which known as the "upper courthouse", was erected a few yards to the east of the original courthouse, which was subsequently referred to as the "lower courthouse". The upper courthouse was generally used for the assizes while the quarter sessions continued to be held in the lower courthouse. The upper court was also used as a corn market.

In the late 18th century civic leaders decided to erect a new town hall on the site of the lower courthouse which was duly demolished in 1759. (Note: The upper courthouse was also in a very poor state and it was demolished in 1783.) The new town hall was financed from a combination of public subscription and contributions from the justices. It was designed in the neoclassical style, built with Portland stone on the ground floor and red brick above and was completed in 1763. The design involved a symmetrical main frontage with five bays facing onto the High Street; the central section of three bays, which slightly projected forward, was topped with a pediment and at roof level there was a cupola with Ionic order columns, which was capped with a gilded ball and a weather vane. In 1813 a new projecting clock was installed in the pediment, which struck the hours upon a bell in the cupola (its weight-driven mechanism remained in use until replaced by a synchronous electric drive, provided by the Synchronome company in 1936).

Internally, the principal room was the council chamber on the first floor, which featured pedimented windows and a fine Rococo ceiling. A new 'lower court' occupied the western half of the ground floor, while the eastern part was open and arcaded, to allow markets to be held. The lower court continued to be used for the assizes and in 1847 the ground floor was fully enclosed, to enable the court room to expand. A prison cell was established above the council chamber: prisoners who were detained there while awaiting deportation applied graffiti to the walls. (The gaol was closed in around 1827, apparently after the escape of a prisoner being held there). By 1898, the town hall was already too small for the needs of the growing town, with the local directory stating that the building was "a miserable specimen of the poverty-stricken architecture of those days, possessing no room adequate to the needs of a large town, and necessitating the scattering of the offices of the Corporation." However, the town hall remained the main meeting place of Maidstone Municipal Borough Council until council offices were established at Tonbridge Road in the 1960s, and the council chamber in the town hall is still used by its successor body, Maidstone Borough Council, for committee meetings.

== See also ==
- Grade II* listed buildings in Maidstone (borough)
