= St Peter's and St Paul's Church, Teston =

Coordinates: 51.255198°N 0.442685°E

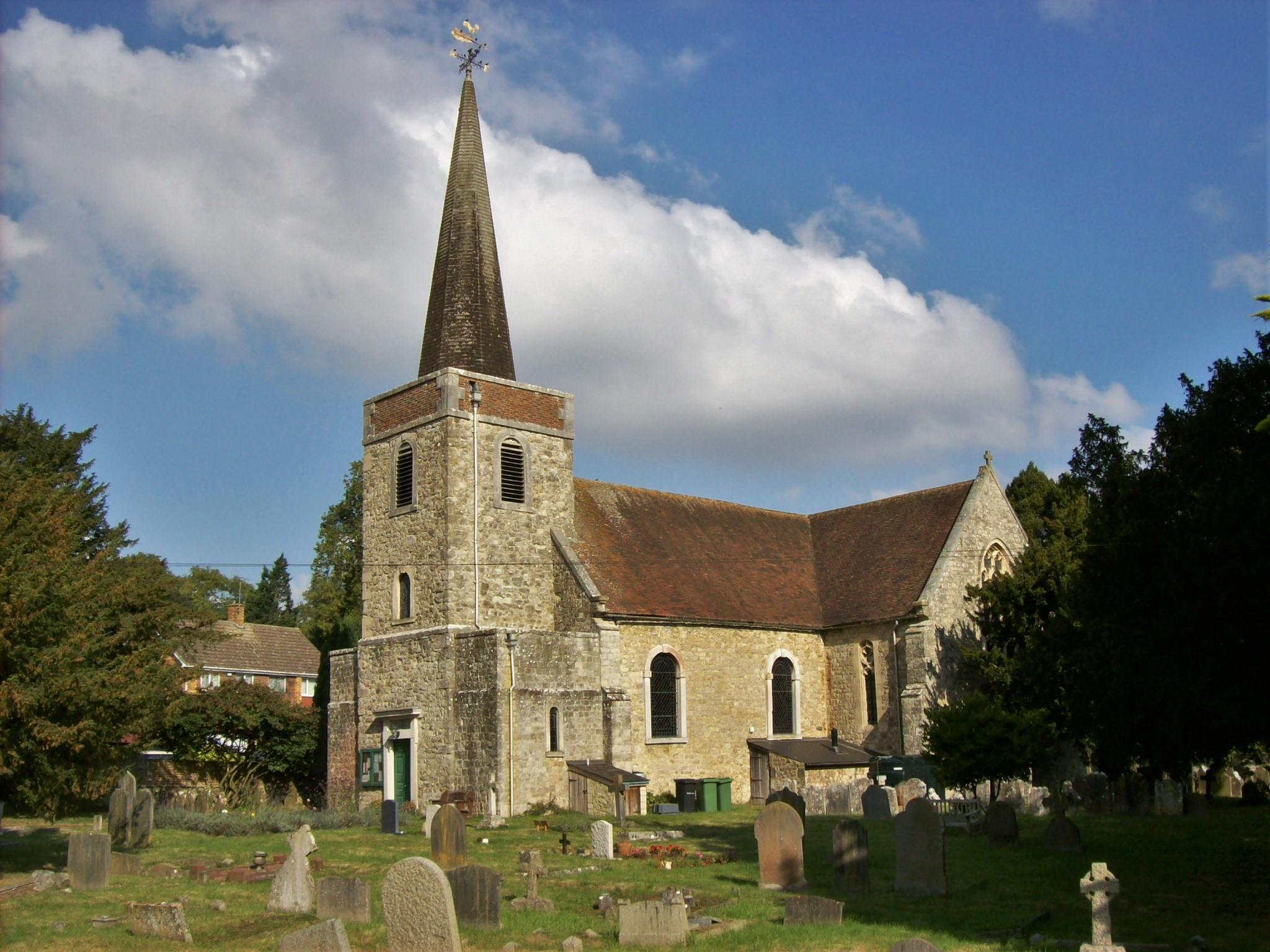

- Location within Kent
- OS grid reference: TQ 70551 53506
- Location: Teston, Kent
- Country: England
- Denomination: Anglican

History
- Status: Parish church

Architecture
- Functional status: Active
- Heritage designation: Grade II*
- Designated: 23 May 1967

Administration
- Province: Canterbury
- Diocese: Rochester
- Archdeaconry: Tonbridge
- Deanery: Malling

St Peter's and St Paul's is a parish church in Teston, Kent. It is a Grade II* listed building and was rebuilt in 1736 for Sir Philip Boteler of Barham Court.

== Building ==
=== Structure ===
The church is constructed to a cruciform plan in roughly coursed and galleted ragstone with ashlar dressings. It features a plain tiled roof. The west tower is two stages with round-arched belfry windows in the north, south and west facades of the upper stage and a brick parapet over a band of ashlar stonework. Infil in the angles between tower and nave feature small round arched windows in the north and south sides. The spire is octagonal and covered with wooden shingles with a weather vane.

The nave, chancel and the transepts are buttressed externally at each side of the gable ends. The north and south facades of the nave feature pairs of round arched windows. The north and south windows to the transepts and the east window of the chancel are pointed arched 19th century and three-lighted.

=== Interior ===
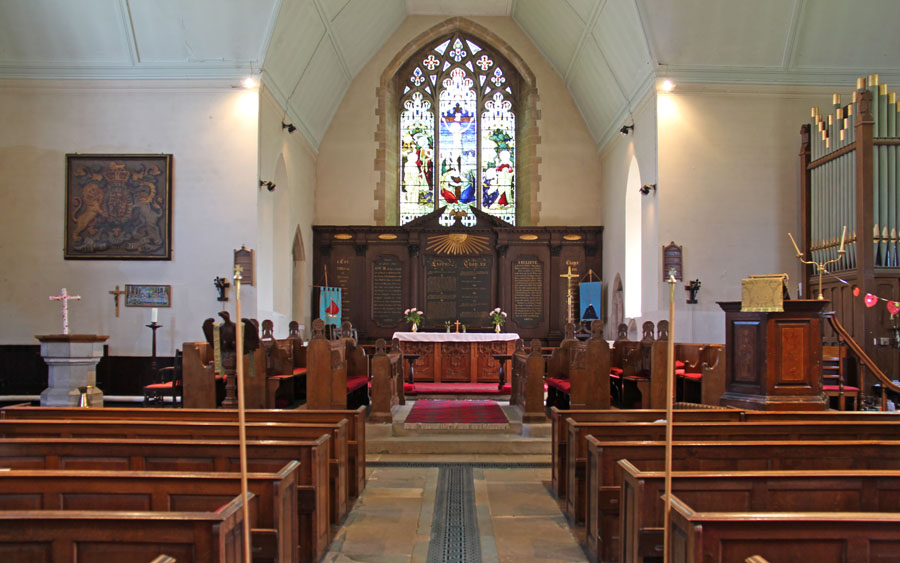
Interior of the church

A medieval stone ambry is located west of the sedile which is located on the south wall of the chancel and formed from a relocated medieval trefoiled two-light window. The east end of the chancel is occupied with a five panel wooden reredos of circa 1736 featuring the Ten Commandments on the central panel with the Lord's Prayer and religious texts on the outer panels. The hexagonal wooded pulpit is 18th century and the stone font is octagonal.

== Churchyard ==
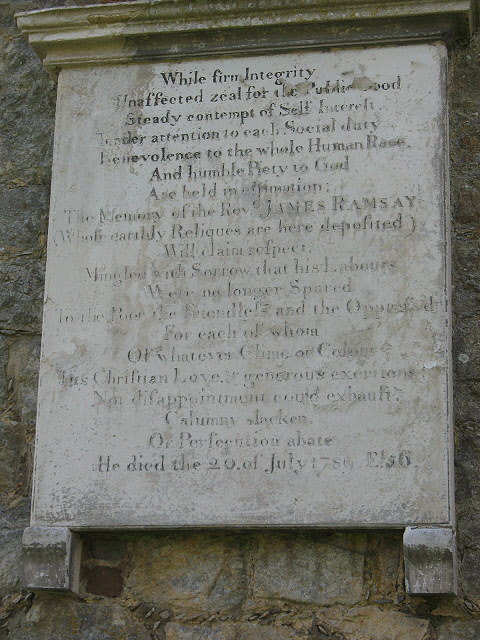
Memorial to James Ramsey

The small churchyard to the east, south and west of the church contains memorials to James Ramsey, vicar and abolitionist. and grade II listed monuments to Henry Lomas and Susanna Field.

== See also ==
- Grade II* listed buildings in Maidstone (borough)
