= Broomfield, Maidstone =

Village in Kent, England

Coordinates: 51.243530°N 0.634900°E

Broomfield
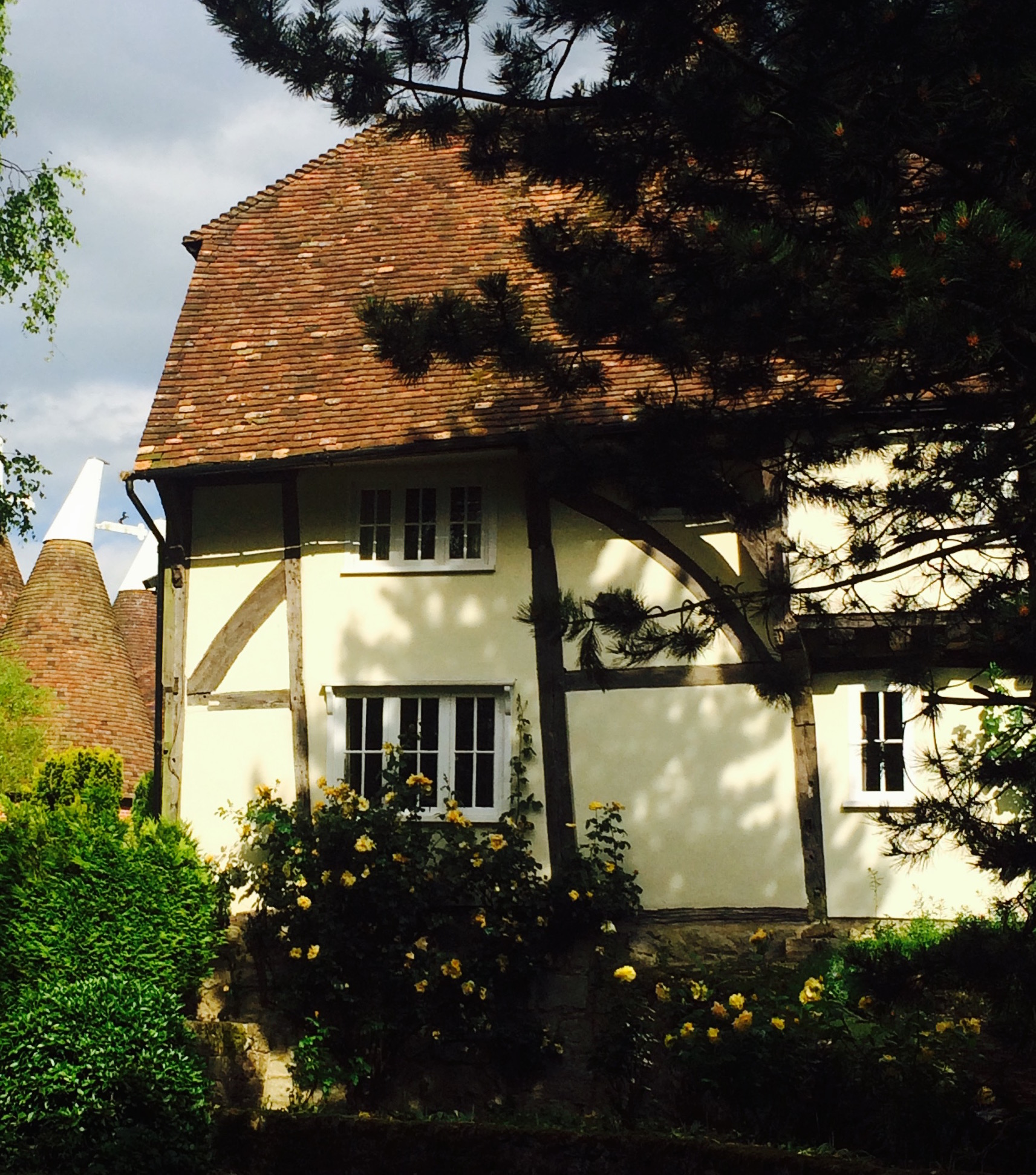
- Farmhouse in Broomfield

- Location within Kent
- Civil parish: Broomfield and Kingswood
- District: Maidstone
- Shire county: Kent
- Region: South East
- Country: England
- Sovereign state: United Kingdom
- Post town: Maidstone
- Postcode district: ME17 1
- Police: Kent
- Fire: Kent
- Ambulance: South East Coast
- UK Parliament: Faversham and Mid Kent

Broomfield is a village in the civil parish of Broomfield and Kingswood, in the Maidstone district of Kent, England. It lies 6 miles (10 km) to the east of Maidstone. The village is located just upstream of Leeds Castle on the River Len, one of the tributaries of the River Medway.

The parish church is dedicated to Saint Margaret. In the 16th and 17th centuries Broomfield was home to the first two generations of the Hatch family of bellfounders, who lived in the farmhouse at Roses Farm. Their output included the bell known as "Bell Harry", after which the central tower of Canterbury Cathedral is known.

There is also a Broomfield, in East Kent, in the parish of Herne and Broomfield, on the outskirts of Herne Bay.

== Bibliography ==
- Goodsall, R.H. (1970), A Third Kentish Patchwork, Stedehill, ISBN 978-0-950-01511-8
- Stahlschmidt, J.C.L. (1887), The Church Bells of Kent: Their Inscriptions, Founders, Uses and Traditions, Stock, OCLC 12772194
