= Malling Rural District =

Former local government area in the UK

Coordinates: 51.293880°N 0.408653°E

Malling was a rural district in Kent, England which covered West Malling, East Malling, Snodland, Larkfield, Borough Green and Aylesford.

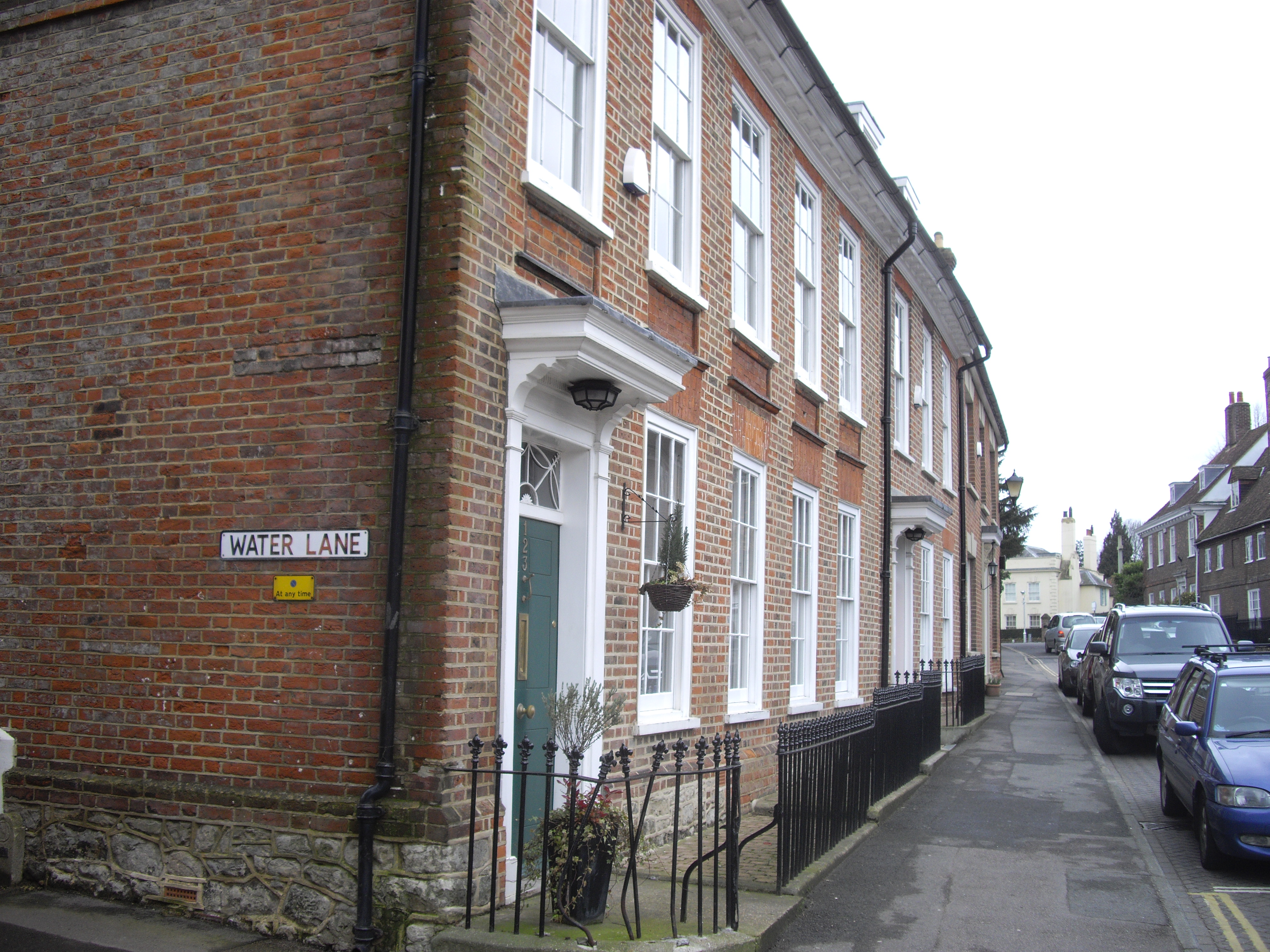
Elwood House: Council's headquarters

From after the Second World War until its abolition in 1974 the council was based at Elwood House at 123–125 High Street in West Malling.

In 1974 the district was merged into the Borough of Tonbridge and Malling.
