= Fairbourne Heath, Kent =

Village in Kent, England

Coordinates: 51°13′20″N 0°39′37″E

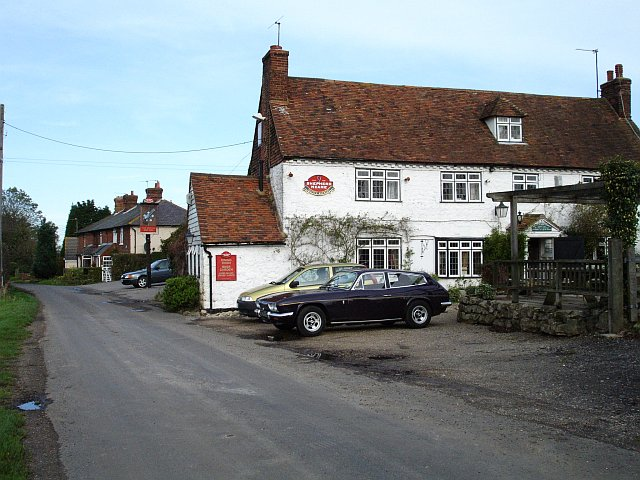
The Pepperbox, Fairbourne Heath

Fairbourne Heath is a hamlet in the civil parish of Ulcombe, Kent, England. It is located on a crossroads of two minor roads. Fairbourne Manor Farm lies to the north.
