= Cranbrook Rural District =

Former local government area in the UK

Coordinates: 51.094931°N 0.530013°E

Cranbrook was a rural district in Kent, England. In 1974 the district was merged into the Borough of Tunbridge Wells.

The district covered Cranbrook and the surrounding villages of Benenden, Frittenden, Goudhurst, Hawkhurst, Sandhurst and Sissinghurst.
