= Wichling =

Village in Kent, England

Coordinates: 51.268°N 0.745°E

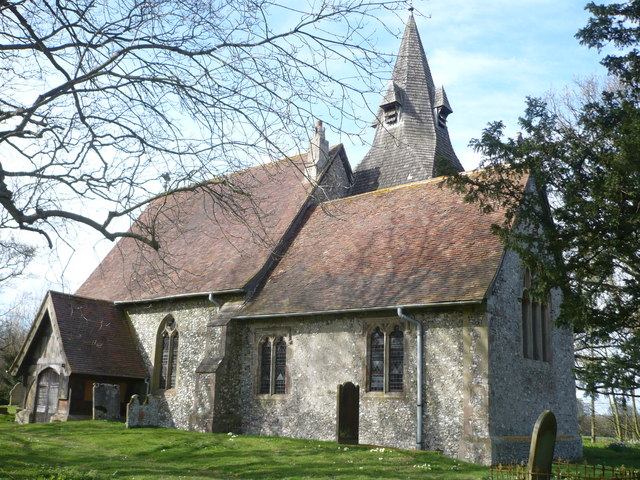
- St Margaret's Church, Wichling

- Location within Kent
- District: Maidstone
- Shire county: Kent
- Region: South East
- Country: England
- Sovereign state: United Kingdom
- Post town: SITTINGBOURNE
- Postcode district: ME9
- Police: Kent
- Fire: Kent
- Ambulance: South East Coast
- UK Parliament: Faversham and Mid Kent

Wichling (otherwise Wychling) is a village and civil parish within the local government district of Maidstone, in England. The parish lies approximately 10 miles (16 km) to the east of Maidstone. It lies near the top of the ridge of the North Downs and consists mainly of isolated farms and houses: the population is therefore small in number.

A small settlement was recorded in Domesday Book as "Winchelsmere". The Lord of the manor was Hugh, nephew of Herbert ("the same Hugh") who held the land from the Bishop of Bayeux, at that time Odo of Bayeux. There was ploughed land of around 400 acres (160 ha) (half a "sulung"), there was enough woodland for 5 pigs and the church is mentioned. Before the Norman Conquest it had been worth 100 shillings (£5), but after the conquest was only worth 40 shillings (£2). (Note: The same Hugh holds Wichling of the bishop. It is assessed at half a sulung. There is land for 1 plough, and there is [1 plough] in demesne, with 3 slaves, and a church, and woodland for 5 pigs; and TRE in Canterbury 3 houses rendering 20d belonged to this manor. The whole TRE was worth 100s: and afterwards, as now, 40s. Wulfgeat held it of King Edward and could go where he pleased.)

The parish church dedicated to St Margaret was begun in the 12th century and restored 1882–3 by Clarke. The church has two bells set for swing chiming by lever, the earliest of which is from 1430 by John Walgrave of London.

The first tier of local government is a parish meeting.

== See also ==
- Listed buildings in Wichling
