= Downswood =

Civil parish in Kent, England

Coordinates: 51°15′35″N 0°33′48″E

Downswood is a civil parish in the Borough of Maidstone in Kent, England. The population of the civil parish at the 2011 census was 2,291. It is bounded to the north by the River Len and Bearsted, and to the south by Otham, and is 2 miles (3 km) from Maidstone, the county town of Kent. Downswood has been a parish in its own right since 1987. Prior to this it was part of the civil parish of Otham.

The village is to the east of the Maidstone urban area, with Mote Park forming the western boundary.

A corn mill was recorded in the Domesday Book on the River Len. A fulling mill was also established on the river but this was not until around 1550. To the south of Downswood lies St Nicolas's Church which has its origins in the 12th century and to the east stands The Orchard Spot, a local public house, that was originally established in the 14th century as a farm house for local orchards.

Between 1940 and 1970 the area was quarried for ragstone which is still evident from outcrops that appear in Spot Lane Nature Reserve and The Len Valley Walk. The easternmost ragstone quarry exhibits a series of cambered blocks, tilted down slope and intervening loess filled gulls. The site in Downswood provides the best cross section through a series of cambers and gulls that are currently visible in Britain and is a site of special scientific interest.
