= Harrietsham =

Village in Kent, England

Coordinates: 51.243°N 0.673°E

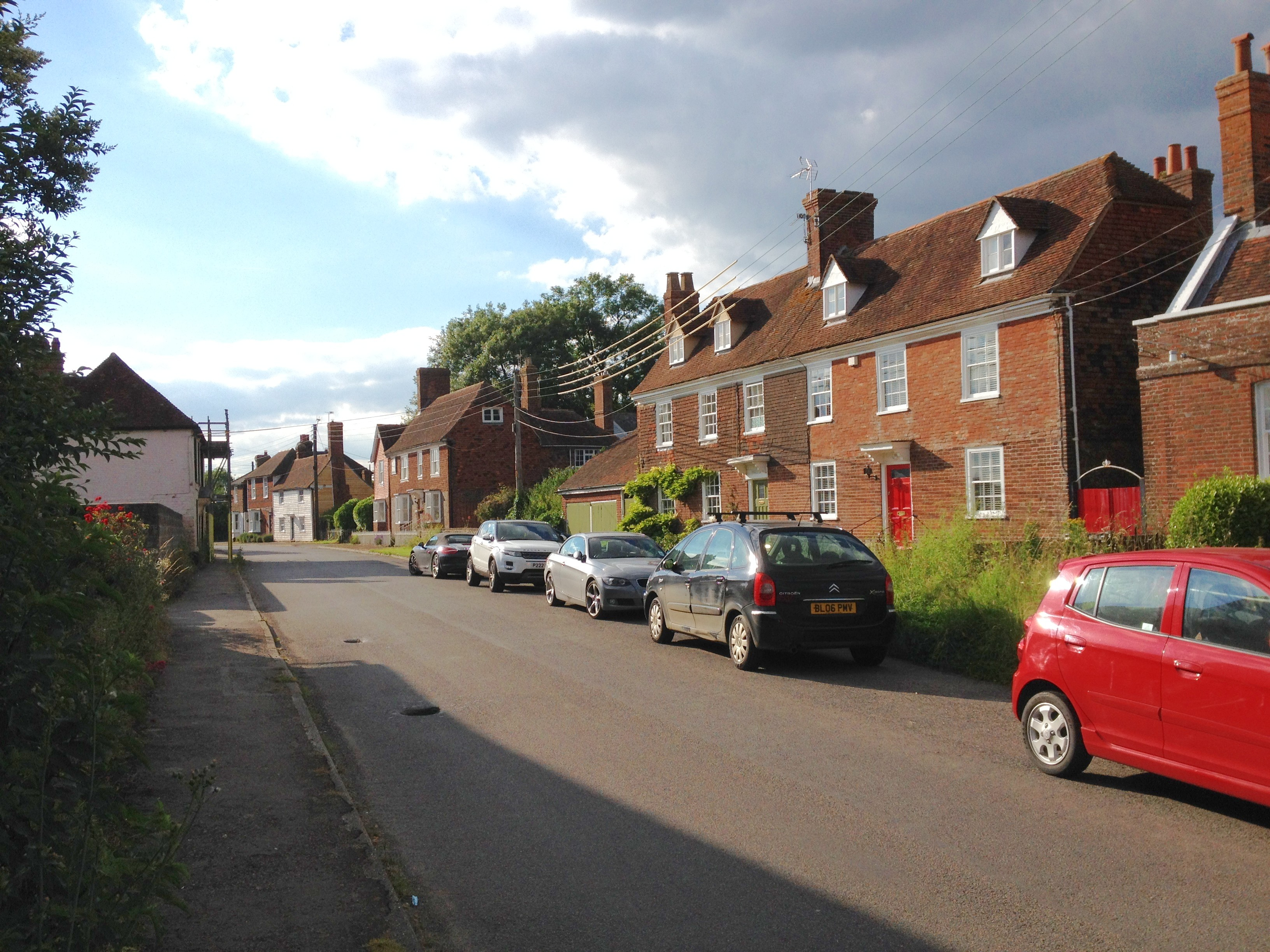
- East Street, Harrietsham

- Location within Kent
- Population: 2,113 (2011 Census)
- OS grid reference: TQ8657152803
- District: Maidstone
- Shire county: Kent
- Region: South East
- Country: England
- Sovereign state: United Kingdom
- Post town: MAIDSTONE
- Postcode district: ME17
- Dialling code: 01622
- Police: Kent
- Fire: Kent
- Ambulance: South East Coast
- UK Parliament: Faversham and Mid Kent

Harrietsham is a rural and industrial village and civil parish in the Maidstone District of Kent, England. According to the United Kingdom Census 2001, it had a population of 1,504, increasing to 2,113 at the 2011 Census. The parish is in the North Downs, 7 miles (10 km) east of Maidstone; it includes the settlements of Marley, Pollhill and Fairbourne.

== History ==
Harrietsham is noted in the Domesday Book.

In mediaeval times, the manor of Harrietsham passed through a succession of families, including the Adam family of Essex. The manor subsequently passed from Stephen Adam to his sister Eve, wife of John Levett of Hollington, East Sussex. On Levett's death, his widow remarried Laurence Ashburnham, Gent., of Broomham, Sussex, ancestor of the Ashburnham baronets, bringing the manor of Harrietsham into the Ashburnham family.

The village contains a number of listed buildings, the most important of which architecturally are Bell Farm House in East Street and the Saxon Church of St John the Baptist, which are both listed Grade I. The village also includes a church dedicated to St Peter, a Roman Catholic church and several nonconformist churches.

The Olympic Torch of London 2012 travelled through Harrietsham.

== Geography ==
The River Len flows through the village south of the M20, on which is located Holme Mill.

The large Marley works to the east of the centre detract from the rural tranquility as well as the transport corridor.

== Transport ==
The village is bypassed by the A20 road, which links Maidstone and Ashford.

Harrietsham railway station serves the village. Southeastern operates trains between London Victoria, Maidstone East and Ashford International.

Stagecoach South East operates a regular service on route 10X between Ashford and Maidstone.

Both the M20 motorway and High Speed 1 pass through the parish.

== See also ==
- Listed buildings in Harrietsham
