= Broomfield and Kingswood =

Civil parish in Kent, England

Coordinates: 51°14′10″N 0°37′46″E

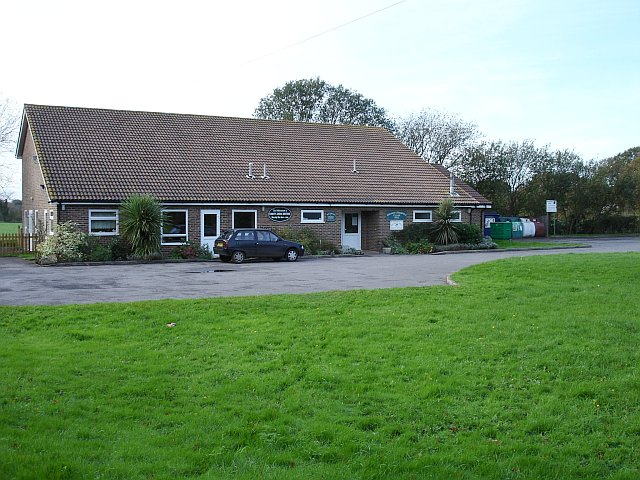
- Broomfield and Kingswood Village Hall

- Location within Kent
- Population: 1,604 (2011 census)
- Civil parish: Broomfield and Kingswood
- District: Maidstone
- Shire county: Kent
- Region: South East
- Country: England
- Sovereign state: United Kingdom
- Police: Kent
- Fire: Kent
- Ambulance: South East Coast

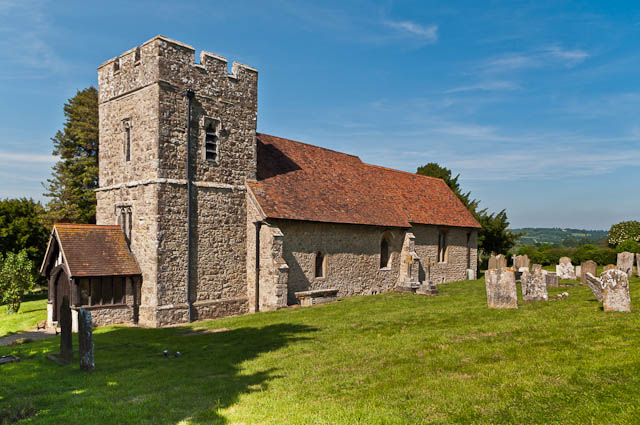
St Margaret's Church, Broomfield

Broomfield and Kingswood is a civil parish in the Maidstone district of Kent, England. The parish lies to the east of Maidstone, south of the A20 road to Folkestone. According to the 2001 census it had a population of 1,545, increasing to 1,604 at the 2011 Census. The parish covers the villages of Broomfield and Kingswood. On 4 August 1992 the parish was renamed from "Broomfield" to "Broomfield and Kingswood".

== See also ==
- Listed buildings in Broomfield and Kingswood
