= Langley, Kent =

Village in Kent, England

Coordinates: 51.236386°N 0.584196°E

Langley
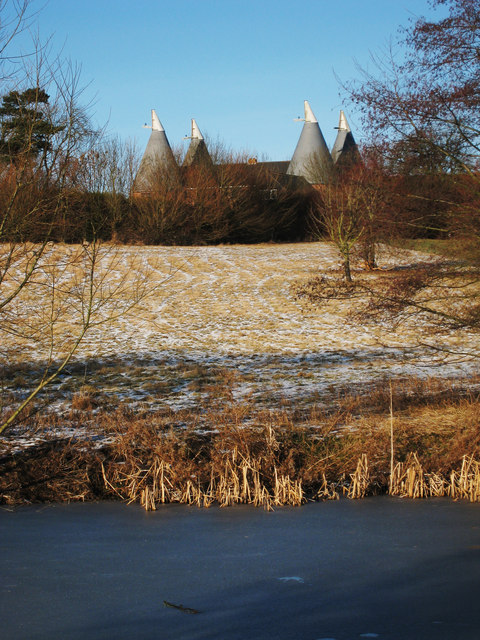

- Location within Kent
- Area: 2.945 sq mi (7.63 km^{2})
- Population: 1,128 (2001 Census); 1,187 (2011 Census)
  - Density: 383/sq mi (148/km^{2})
- Civil parish: Langley Parish
- District: Maidstone
- Shire county: Kent
- Region: South East
- Country: England
- Sovereign state: United Kingdom
- Post town: MAIDSTONE
- Postcode district: ME17
- Dialling code: 01622
- UK Parliament: Faversham and Mid Kent
- Website: Official Langley website

Langley is a village and civil parish in the Maidstone District of Kent, England. The parish is situated on the A274 road, which runs south from Maidstone to Headcorn.

== History ==
Langley is a common English place-name, derived from the Old English lang leah, meaning 'long field or woodland'. The village first appears in records in 814 as Longanleag.

The village church is dedicated to St Mary. Behind the church is a lake, which may have been the site of the medieval judicial practice of trial by cold water. When a jury could not determine a person's innocence, the decision was left to God. If the accused floated, it was taken as a sign of guilt, as the water supposedly rejected them. If they sank, the water accepted them and thus were innocent. Although the belief was that the water "accepted" the innocent, in some cases the result was drowning. The practice had to take place close to the church because the water was considered holy.

Maidstone Museum & Art Gallery exhibits artifacts excavated from a site in Langley believed to have been a walled Roman cemetery.

== Geography ==
The village is three miles (5km) from the county town.

== Culture and Community ==
The village has two public houses, The Potting Shed, and The Plough.

Its post office has been closed for over 10 years.

There is also 'Langley Heath' and by it is a wood called Abbey Wood.

There is a village hall, on it is a playing field with room for 2 football pitches, and a small play area, and a basketball net.

== See also ==
- Listed buildings in Langley, Kent
