= Chart Sutton =

Civil parish and village in Kent, England

Coordinates: 51.223550°N 0.570900°E

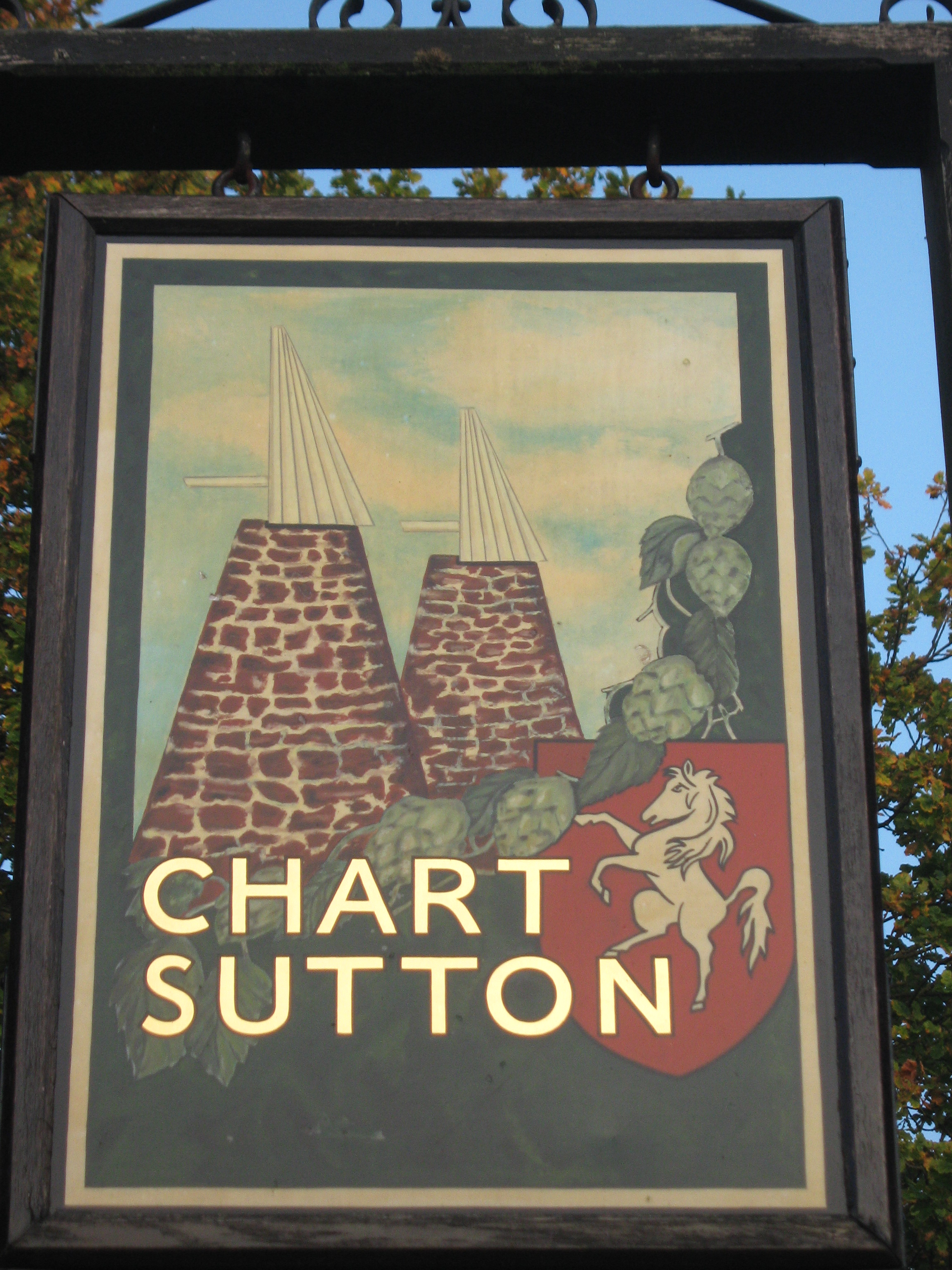
- Village sign

- Location within Kent
- Population: 870 (2011 Census)
- District: Maidstone
- Shire county: Kent
- Region: South East
- Country: England
- Sovereign state: United Kingdom
- Post town: Maidstone
- Postcode district: ME17
- Police: Kent
- Fire: Kent
- Ambulance: South East Coast
- UK Parliament: Weald of Kent

Chart Sutton is a civil parish and small village on the edge of the Weald of Kent, England. It lies approximately 5 miles (8 km) to the south of Maidstone.

The village is small, with around 800 inhabitants, but has a village hall, a pop-up shop and a park; although the corner shop, which housed the Post Office, and the village's public house, The Buffalo's Head, have both now closed.

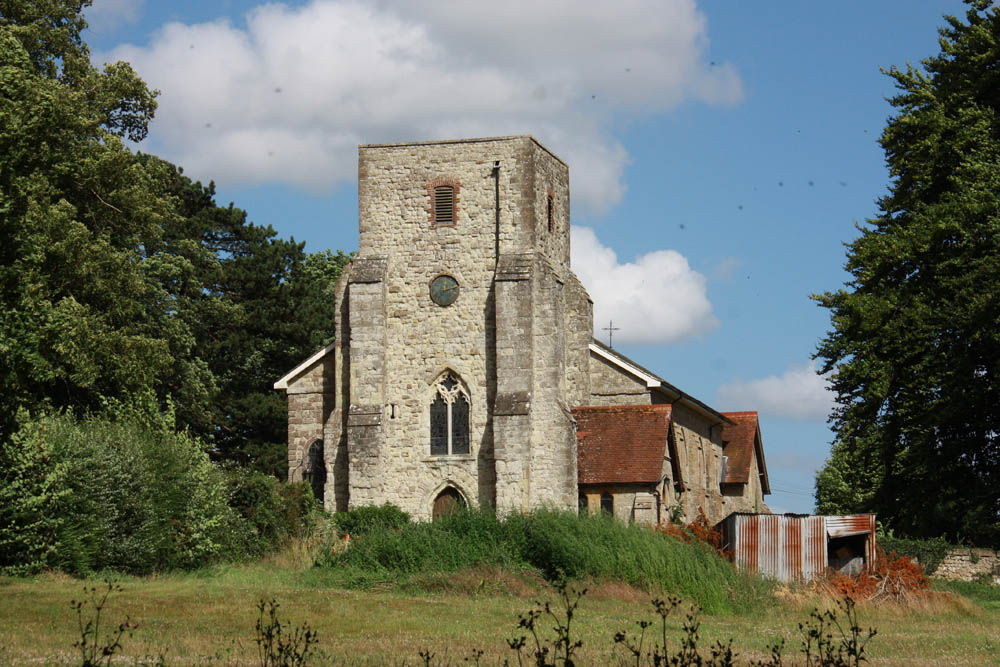
St Michael's Church

St Michael's Church, parts of which date back to the 14th century, lies outside the village centre, in between Chart Sutton and Sutton Valence. The church shares its vicar with Sutton Valence and East Sutton; the three villages are collectively known as the "Three Suttons" and have close connections with each other. They now share their vicar with Headcorn.

== See also ==
- Listed buildings in Chart Sutton
