= Otham =

Village in Kent, England

Coordinates: 51.252°N 0.574°E

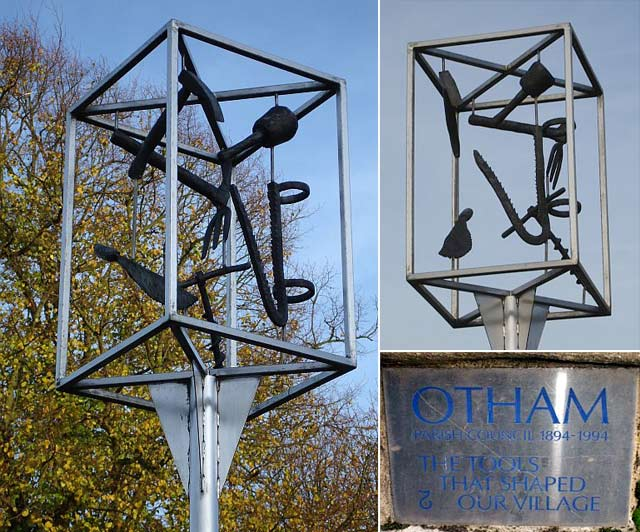
- The village sign

- Location within Kent
- Population: 523
- OS grid reference: TQ798536
- District: Maidstone
- Shire county: Kent
- Region: South East
- Country: England
- Sovereign state: United Kingdom
- Post town: MAIDSTONE
- Postcode district: ME15
- Dialling code: 01622
- Police: Kent
- Fire: Kent
- Ambulance: South East Coast
- UK Parliament: Faversham and Mid Kent
- Website: Otham Parish Council

Otham is a village and civil parish in the Maidstone district of Kent, England. The population of the civil parish at the 2011 census was 523, with 204 dwellings.

== Buildings ==
The village itself has been in existence since before the time of the Domesday Book. The village was given by William the Conqueror to his half-brother Odo, bishop of Baieux, although the lands were later handed to the crown. Under Henry III, the land was held by knight Peter de Otham, with the land changing hands several more times throughout time.

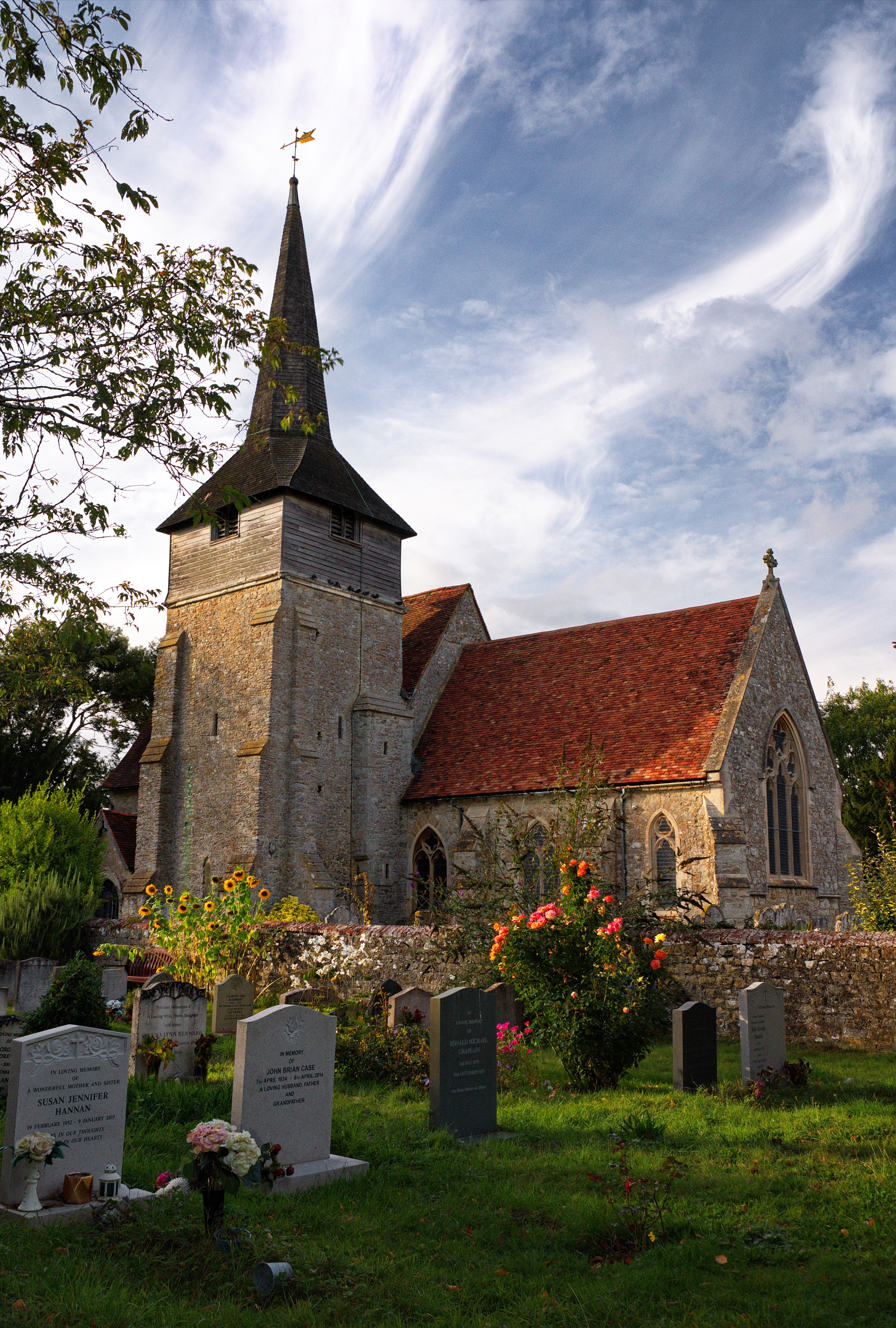
St Nicholas's Church

One of the village's oldest buildings, the 12th-century parish church of St Nicholas, is a Grade I listed building. The vicar is Reverend Steven Hughes MBE. Otham also has a number of listed mediaeval houses including Otham Manor (Grade I), Synyards (Grade I) and Stoneacre (Grade II*). Stoneacre itself is a small National Trust property, which is a private residence but is opened to visitors on Saturdays and Bank Holiday Mondays from April to September.

Otham has a circular walk of 7 km which includes the Spot Lane Nature Reserve and Stoneacre. Much of the central village is protected as part of the Otham Conservation Area, due to the village being a "well-preserved example of an affluent medieval village which still maintains a strong sense of identity".

The White Horse pub is located in Otham. The White Horse Inn had two Publicans, the first William Goodwin (born in 1746) and then his son, Solomon William Goodwin who was born in 1833.

Otham Manor was a 14th-century Wealden hall house, but was extensively modified in later centuries; it was most recently modified and extended in the 20th century. The property was Grade I listed in 1952; The Listing described it as a "GV I House, formerly cottages, now house. Late C14, with C16 alterations and additions. Restored circa 1912 by Sir Louis Mallet." The estate was in a state of "semi-dereliction by the early 1990s" according to Country Life (magazine). It was subsequently restored by new owners and listed for sale in 2019.

== Sport ==
Bearsted F.C. play their home matches at Honey Lane in Otham, and the village is also home to Rumwood Cricket Club.

== Development ==
The village of Otham is set to be expanded hugely over the next 10 years due to Maidstone Borough Council's Local Plan. The village currently has 204 dwellings, but is set to be expanded, with the construction of 1251 more on sites at Church Road (440 houses), Bicknor Farm (286 houses), Bicknor Green (190 houses) and Bicknor Farm (335 houses). These constructions are opposed by the Parish Council, who state the construction is "likely to have a significant impact upon our village" and "will disproportionately affect Otham and nearby parishes".
