= Borough of Maidstone =

- Non-metropolitan district
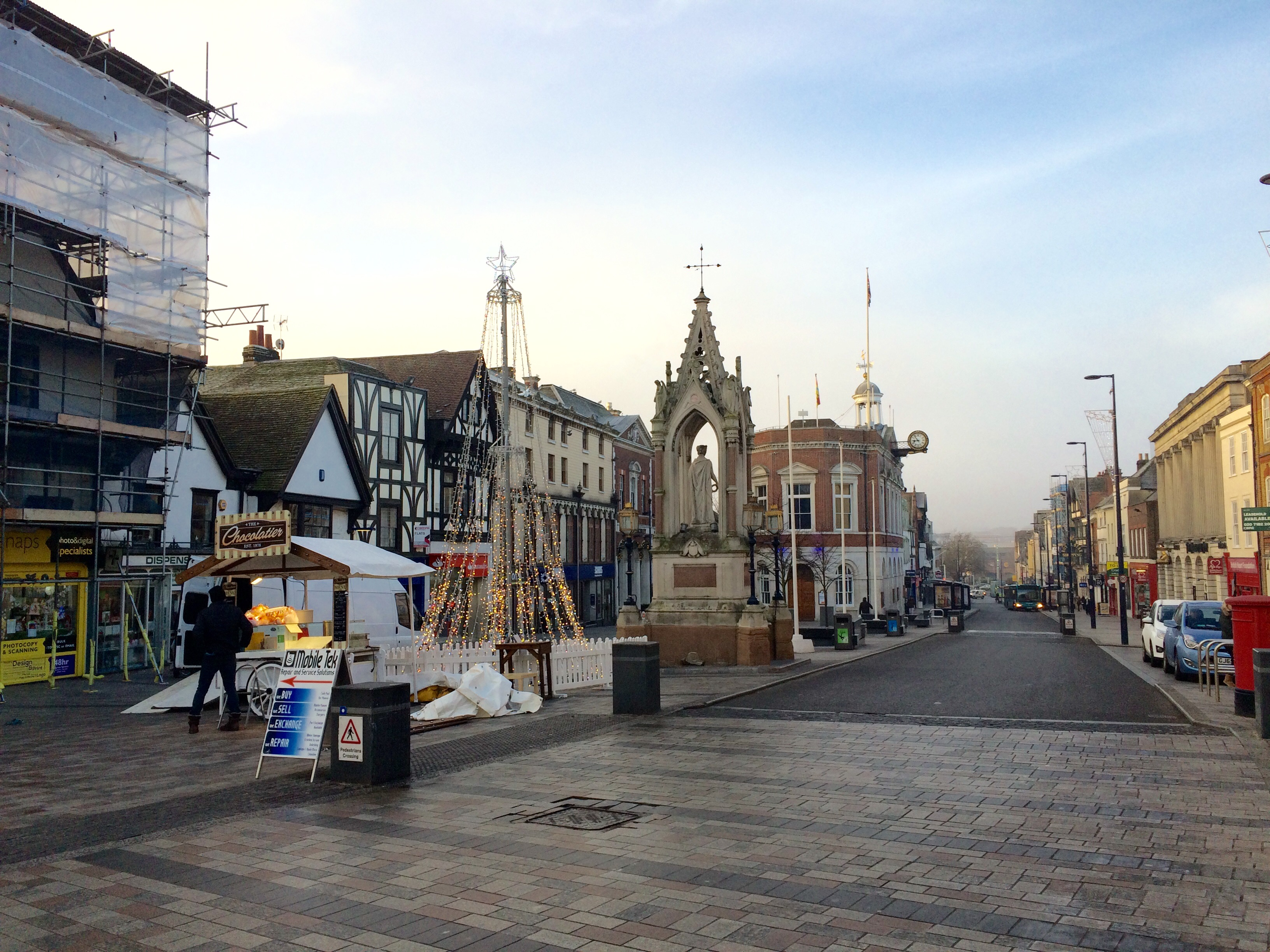
- Jubilee Square, Maidstone

- Coat of arms

- Maidstone shown within Kent
- Coordinates: 51°16′24″N 0°31′20″E
- Sovereign state: United Kingdom
- Constituent country: England
- Region: South East England
- Non-metropolitan county: Kent
- Status: Non-metropolitan district
- Admin HQ: Maidstone
- Incorporated: 1 April 1974

Government
  - Type: Non-metropolitan district council
  - Body: Maidstone Borough Council
  - Leadership: Committees (No overall control)
  - MPs: Helen Whately; Helen Grant

Area
  - Total: 151.9 sq mi (393.3 km^{2})
  - Rank: 87th (of 296)

Population (2024)
  - Total: 187,767
  - Rank: 115th (of 296)
  - Density: 1,236/sq mi (477.4/km^{2})

Ethnicity (2021)
  - Ethnic groups: List: 89.8% White; 4.7% Asian; 2.3% Mixed; 2.1% Black; 1.2% other

Religion (2021)
  - Religion: List: 49.3% Christianity; 40.1% no religion; 5.7% not stated; 1.9% Islam; 1.4% Hinduism; 0.8% Buddhism; 0.6% other; 0.2% Sikhism; 0.1% Judaism
- Time zone: UTC0 (GMT)
  - Summer (DST): UTC+1 (BST)
- ONS code: 29UH (ONS); E07000110 (GSS)
- OS grid reference: TQ7588156056

The Borough of Maidstone is a local government district with borough status in Kent, England. It is named after its largest settlement of Maidstone, the county town of Kent, which is also where the council is based. The borough also includes surrounding rural areas.

The borough was formed on 1 April 1974 by the merger of the municipal borough of Maidstone with the rural districts of Maidstone and Hollingbourne, under the Local Government Act 1972.

Under current local government reorganisation plans, all district councils in Kent, as well as the county council, will be abolished in 2028, with the district becoming part of a new West Kent unitary authority.

== Geography ==
The borough covers an area generally to the east and south of the town of Maidstone: as far north as the M2 motorway; east down the M20 to Lenham; south to a line including Staplehurst and Headcorn; and west towards Tonbridge. It lies between the North Downs and the Weald, and covers the central part of the county. The M20 motorway crosses it from west to east, as does the High Speed 1 railway.

Geologically, the Greensand Ridge lies to the south of the town. The very fine sand provides a good source for glass-making. The clay vale beyond, through which flow the three rivers which meet at Yalding (the Medway, the Beult and the Teise), and the chalk North Downs all provide raw materials for paper- and cement-making; which are also local industries.

== Governance ==
Maidstone Borough Council

Type
- Type: Non-metropolitan district

History
- Founded: 1 April 1974

Leadership
- Mayor: Brian Clark, Liberal Democrat since 16 May 2026
- Leader: Stuart Jeffery, Green Party since 18 May 2024
- Chief Executive: Alison Broom since June 2010

Structure
- Seats: 49 councillors
- Political groups: Administration (23) Green (12) Liberal Democrat (12) Other parties (23) Conservative (13) Labour (6) Fant & Oakwood Ind. (2) Independent (2)
- Length of term: 4 years

Elections
- Voting system: First past the post
- Last election: 2 May 2024

Meeting place
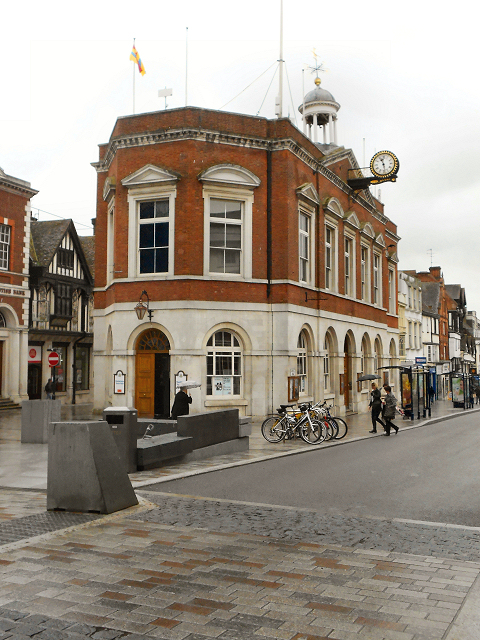
- Town Hall, High Street, Maidstone

Website
- www.maidstone.gov.uk

Maidstone Borough Council provides district-level services. County-level services are provided by Kent County Council. With the exception of the core of the Maidstone built up area, the rest of the borough is also covered by civil parishes, which form a third tier of local government for their areas.

=== Political control ===
The council has been under no overall control since 2023. Following the 2024 election, a coalition of the Liberal Democrats, Greens and four of the independent councillors formed to run the council, led by Green councillor Stuart Jeffery.

The first election to the council was held in 1973, initially operating as a shadow authority before coming into its powers on 1 April 1974. Political control of the council since 1974 has been held by the following parties:

Party in control	Years
No overall control	1974–1976
Conservative	1976–1983
No overall control	1983–2008
Conservative	2008–2014
No overall control	2014–2021
Conservative	2021–2023
No overall control	2023–present

=== Leadership ===
The role of Mayor of Maidstone is largely ceremonial, usually being held by a different councillor each year. Political leadership is instead provided by the leader of the council. The leaders since 2007 have been:

Councillor	Party	From	To
Fran Wilson	Liberal Democrats	2007	2008
Chris Garland	Conservative	2008	May 2014
Annabelle Blackmore	Conservative	7 Jun 2014	May 2015
Fran Wilson	Liberal Democrats	23 May 2015	May 2018
Martin Cox	Liberal Democrats	19 May 2018	May 2021
David Burton	Conservative	22 May 2021	May 2024
Stuart Jeffrey	Green	18 May 2024	

=== Composition ===
Following the 2024 election and subsequent changes of allegiance up to August 2026, the composition of the council was as follows:

Party	Councillors
Conservative	13
Green	12
Liberal Democrats	11
Labour	6
Reform	3
Fant and Oakwood Independents	2
Independent	2
Total	49

The two independents sit with local party the Fant & Oakwood Independents as the 'Independent and Fant & Oakwood Independents Group'.

=== Elections ===
Since the last boundary changes in 2024, 49 councillors have been elected from 26 wards, with each ward electing one, two or three councillors. Elections are held every four years.

=== Premises ===
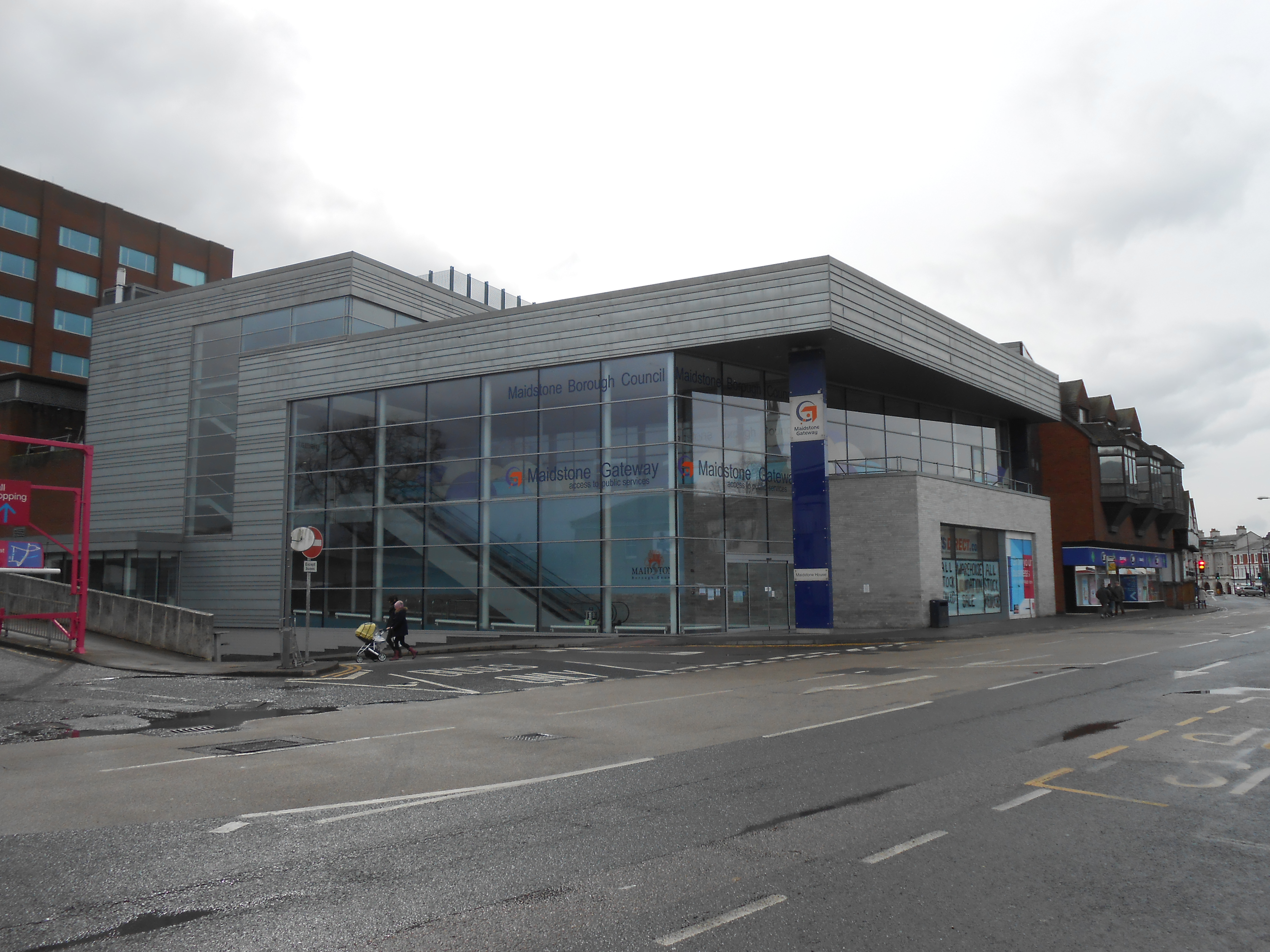
Maidstone House, King Street, Maidstone: Council's offices.

Council meetings are held at Maidstone Town Hall in the High Street. The council has its main offices at Maidstone House (formerly called Maidstone Gateway) on King Street in the centre of Maidstone.

== Parishes ==
The third tier of local government is the civil parish; in Maidstone some of the parishes have neither a parish council nor a parish meeting, as indicated (1):

- Barming
- Bearsted
- Bicknor (1)
- Boughton Malherbe
- Boughton Monchelsea
- Boxley
- Bredhurst
- Broomfield and Kingswood
- Chart Sutton
- Collier Street
- Coxheath
- Detling
- Downswood
- East Farleigh
- East Sutton
- Frinsted (1)
- Harrietsham
- Headcorn
- Hollingbourne
- Hucking (1)
- Hunton
- Langley
- Leeds
- Lenham
- Linton
- Loose
- Marden
- Nettlestead
- Otham
- Otterden (1)
- Staplehurst
- Stockbury
- Sutton Valence
- Teston
- Thurnham
- Tovil
- Ulcombe
- West Farleigh
- Wichling (1)
- Wormshill (1)
- Yalding

== Transport ==
=== Water ===
The River Medway was the earliest form of transport through the area. It was navigable for cargo-carrying craft as far upstream as Tonbridge, and it was only in the 19th century that the railways brought any change. More recently, various works have been carried out to control the frequent flooding in the clay vale upstream of Maidstone.

=== Roads ===
Maidstone, as its importance warranted, has been the hub of roads for many centuries. It lies very close to the Pilgrims' Way; and two Roman roads met south of the town: one from Rochester to Hastings the other branching off to the East Kent coast and Dover.

In the 18th century came the turnpiked roads. One of the earliest in the county – that to Rochester and Chatham – was opened in 1728.

In modern times, two motorways – the M2 and the M20 – pass to the far north of the borough and just north of the town centre of Maidstone respectively.

=== Railways ===
The earliest line through Kent was built by the South Eastern Railway. It was not, however, built to pass through Maidstone: instead, a station was built at Paddock Wood railway station, then named Maidstone Road, some six miles away. It was only in the period between 1844 (when that main line was connected by a branch line to Maidstone) and 1884 that Maidstone became a hub once more, although with local trains only, to Strood, Ashford and via Swanley Junction to London.

== Media ==
=== Television ===
The area is served by the regional news programmes:

- BBC South East Today
- ITV News Meridian

=== Radio ===
Radio stations that broadcast to the area are:

- BBC Radio Kent
- Heart South
- Gold Radio
- KMFM Maidstone

=== Newspapers ===
The area is served by the local newspaper, Kent Messenger.

== Mayors ==
- 1974–75 Martin Corps
- 1975–76 Horace Ashton
- 1976–77 Emil Marchesi
- 1977–78 Veronica Roscow
- 1978–79 John Wood
- 1979–80 Dick Woods
- 1980–81 Ernest Flood
- 1981–82 Clifford Playford
- 1982–83 Gordon Bonner
- 1983–84 Charles McKenna
- 1984–85 Michael Nightingale
- 1985–86 Rosemary Graham
- 1986–87 Sarah Haskett
- 1987–88 Douglas Milner
- 1988–89 Jeremy Hindle
- 1989–90 John Banks
- 1990–91 Mary Black
- 1991–92 Daphne J Parvin
- 1992–93 Madeline Blackham
- 1993–94 Paul Oldham
- 1994–95 Fred Winckless
- 1995–96 Ron Sterry
- 1996–97 Malcolm Robertson
- 1997–98 Jenefer Gibson
- 1998–99 Robert Judd
- 1999–00 Frances Brown
- 2000–01 Dan Daley
- 2001–02 Paulina Stockell
- 2002–03 Patricia Marshall
- 2003–04 Morel D'Souza
- 2004–05 Peter Hooper
- 2005–06 John Horne
- 2006–07 Mike FitzGerald
- 2007–08 Richard Ash
- 2008–09 Denise Joy
- 2009–10 Peter Parvin
- 2010–11 Eric Hotson
- 2011–12 Brian Mortimer
- 2012–13 Rodd Nelson-Gracie
- 2013–14 Clive English
- 2014–15 Richard Thick
- 2015–16 Daniel Moriarty
- 2016–17 Derek Butler
- 2017–18 Malcolm Greer
- 2018–19 David Naghi
- 2019–21 Marion Ring
- 2021–22 Fay Gooch
- 2022–23 Derek Mortimer
- 2023–24 Gordon Newton
- 2024– John Perry
