= Listed buildings in the borough of Maidstone, Kent =

There are about 2,000 Listed Buildings in the Borough of Maidstone, Kent , which are buildings of architectural or historic interest.

- Grade I buildings are of exceptional interest.
- Grade II* buildings are particularly important buildings of more than special interest.
- Grade II buildings are of special interest.

The lists follow Historic England’s geographical organisation, with entries grouped by county, local authority, and parish (civil and non-civil). The following lists are arranged by parish.

parishes	Listed buildings list	Grade I	Grade II*	Grade II
Barming	Listed buildings in Barming			
Bearsted	Listed buildings in Bearsted			
Bicknor	Listed buildings in Bicknor			
Boughton Malherbe	Listed buildings in Boughton Malherbe			
Boughton Monchelsea	Listed buildings in Boughton Monchelsea			
Boxley	Listed buildings in Boxley			
Bredhurst	Listed buildings in Bredhurst			
Broomfield and Kingswood	Listed buildings in Broomfield and Kingswood			
Chart Sutton	Listed buildings in Chart Sutton			
Collier Street	Listed buildings in Collier Street			
Coxheath	Listed buildings in Coxheath			
Detling	Listed buildings in Detling			
Downswood	no listed buildings			
East Farleigh	Listed buildings in East Farleigh			
East Sutton	Listed buildings in East Sutton			
Frinsted	Listed buildings in Frinsted			
Harrietsham	Listed buildings in Harrietsham			
Headcorn	Listed buildings in Headcorn			
Hollingbourne	Listed buildings in Hollingbourne			
Hucking	Listed buildings in Hucking			
Hunton	Listed buildings in Hunton, Kent			
Langley	Listed buildings in Langley, Kent			
Leeds	Listed buildings in Leeds, Kent			
Lenham	Listed buildings in Lenham			
Linton	Listed buildings in Linton, Kent			
Loose	Listed buildings in Loose, Kent			
Maidstone	Listed buildings in Maidstone			
Marden	Listed buildings in Marden, Kent			
Nettlestead	Listed buildings in Nettlestead, Kent			
Otham	Listed buildings in Otham			
Otterden	Listed buildings in Otterden			
Staplehurst	Listed buildings in Staplehurst, Kent			
Stockbury	Listed buildings in Stockbury			
Sutton Valence	Listed buildings in Sutton Valence			
Teston	Listed buildings in Teston			
Thurnham	Listed buildings in Thurnham, Kent			
Tovil	Listed buildings in Tovil			
Ulcombe	Listed buildings in Ulcombe			
West Farleigh	Listed buildings in West Farleigh			
Wichling	Listed buildings in Wichling			
Wormshill	Listed buildings in Wormshill			
Yalding	Listed buildings in Yalding			
