= Nettlestead =

Nettlestead may refer to:

- Nettlestead, Kent
- Nettlestead, Suffolk
