= St Mary's Church, Nettlestead =

Coordinates: 51.243404°N 0.412777°E

St Mary's Church
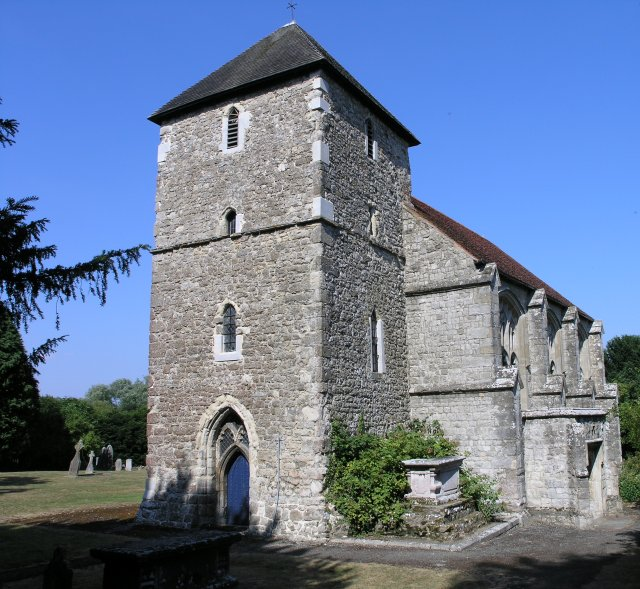
- The west end of the church

- Location within Kent
- OS grid reference: TQ 68507 52124
- Location: Nettlestead, Kent
- Country: England
- Denomination: Anglican; Roman Catholic

History
- Status: Parish church

Architecture
- Functional status: Active
- Heritage designation: Grade I
- Designated: 23 May 1967
- Completed: 13th, 15th and 19th centuries

Administration
- Province: Canterbury
- Diocese: Rochester
- Archdeaconry: Tonbridge
- Deanery: Paddock Wood
- Parish: St Mary's, Nettlestead

St Mary the Virgin is a parish church in Nettlestead, Kent, begun in the 13th century.

== Building ==
Construction of the church began in the 13th century – the square tower at the west end being the only part surviving from this period. The tower is built of roughly-coursed local ragstone and is topped with a pyramidal shingle-covered roof. It features lancet windows in the three outward-facing sides and a medieval doorway installed in 1858 that came from a demolished church at Teston.

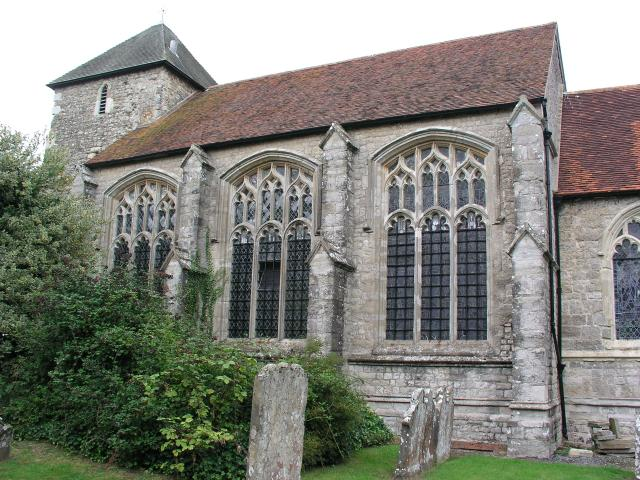
The south side of the nave

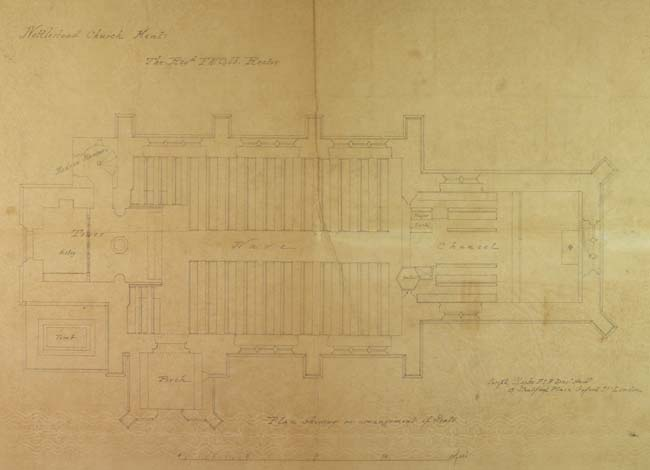
Plan of the church, circa 1858

The nave was built about 1438. The north and south elevations are similar; each divided by tall buttresses into three bays containing large stone-framed windows with curved tops divided into three vertical divisions. The western bay of the south side also contains a porch dated to about 1496. The north side is extended against the tower to enclose a stair turret built in the 19th century. a moulded plinth runs along the base of both façades.

The chancel was built about 1460. It is narrower and set inward from each side of the nave and has lower eaves. The plinth continues and the eastern corners are diagonally buttressed. A single small pointed window with two lights is located at the west end of the north and south sides of the chancel and a pointed three light window in the east end.

Internally, the roof of the chancel has a boarded ceiling with rafters decorated with bosses. The roof of the nave is plastered. A 15th-century tracery screen from Teston church is located at the base of the tower. The church contains wall monuments to Elizabeth Scott (died 1598) and Katharine Scott (died 1616), both featuring kneeling female figures.

The stained glass in the church windows includes panels in the central window on the north side of the nave which were paid for by John or Reginald Pympe of the neighbouring Nettlestead Place in 1438. The north chancel window possibly dates from the 1460s and angels holding heraldic shields in the top lights of many of the windows are also 15th century. Other windows are Victorian or Edwardian in 15th century style.

The church lychgate contains a memorial to casualties of both World Wars and the churchyard contains three chest tomb memorials which are Grade II listed.

== Use ==
The church is used by both Church of England and Roman Catholic congregations, with the Catholic Mass held before the Anglican service on Sundays.

== See also ==
- Grade I listed buildings in Maidstone
