= Nettlestead Green =

Coordinates: 51°14′N 0°25′E

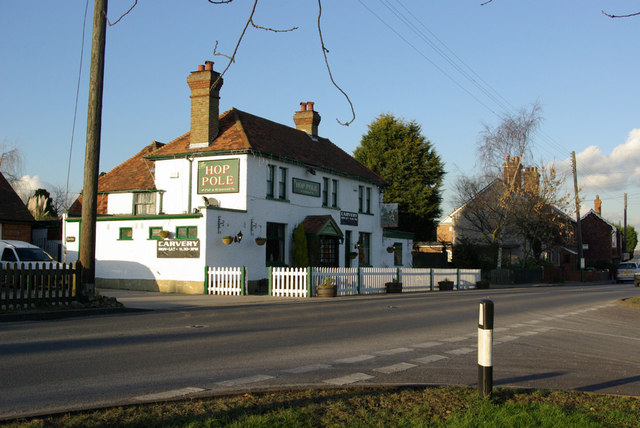
The Hop Pole

Nettlestead Green, like its near neighbour Nettlestead, lies in the Medway valley southwest of Maidstone in Kent.

It has a church and a 17th-century pub, the Hop Pole. The railway station for Yalding is actually closer to Nettlestead Green than to its own village, which lies on the opposite side of the River Medway.

It was here on 26 June 1944 that Warrant Officer R.A.B ("Red") Blumer RAAF died when his Spitfire crashed. A memorial has been erected to his memory, and on the Saturday closest to 26 June each year a memorial service is held at the crash site. Blumer's portrait, and four information panels, hang in the village pub.
