= Hucking =

Hamlet in Kent, England

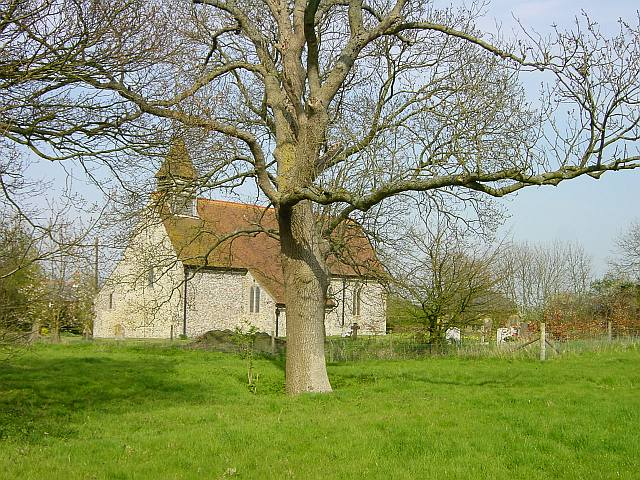
- St Margaret's Church, Hucking

- Location within Kent
- OS grid reference: TQ8458
- Civil parish: Hucking
- District: Maidstone
- Shire county: Kent
- Region: South East
- Country: England
- Sovereign state: United Kingdom
- Post town: MAIDSTONE
- Postcode district: ME17
- Dialling code: 01622
- UK Parliament: Faversham and Mid Kent

Hucking is a small hamlet and civil parish in the Maidstone District of Kent, England. It is located 4 miles (6.4 km) north-east of Maidstone and 5 miles (8.0 km) south-west of Sittingbourne. The parish is governed by a parish meeting.

The settlement sits atop the North Downs in a designated Area of Outstanding Natural Beauty (AONB) near the villages of Hollingbourne, Detling, Bicknor (where the population is included for census purposes) and Wormshill and between the main A249 and B2163 roads connecting the towns of Sittingbourne and Maidstone. The parish church is dedicated to St Margaret.

== History ==
Hucking was historically part of the Hundred of Eyhorne. It has always been sparsely populated and isolated, with the parish forming part of the manor of Hollingbourne. The name may derive from Houkynnge, although in the Middle Ages it was also known as Rumpsted after the family which owned the land.

The church of St Margaret is early Norman in origin and dates to around 1100 AD. It has a small, square wooden belfry in place of a tower and retains some medieval stonework. It was restored in around 1878 and many of its features date from the 19th century. The church was designated as a Grade II listed building in 1968. Two carved headstones in the graveyard are also listed at the same grade.

The local pub, the Hook & Hatchet, was a traditional Kentish pub and, according to website of brewers and operators Shepherd Neame, had been run as such for around 100 years after a local family applied for a "beer and cider" only licence in the late 19th century. The pub was put up for sale by the brewery in early 2015 and closed. An attempt to buy the pub, designated as an asset of community value, was made. A possibly earlier building of the same name was in use as a pub from at least the first half of the 19th Century. The building is listed in the 1841 Census, with Elizabeth Sherwood as publican. The pub re-opened in June 2016.

A Parcelforce van allegedly used in the Securitas depot robbery was recovered from the car park of the Hook & Hatchet on 23 February 2006. Metal cages and packaging material, that may have been used to transport the money, were recovered in a field in nearby Detling on 24 February 2006

== Geography and land use ==
The North Downs Way, a long-distance footpath that passes along the ridge of the North Downs, runs close to the village and parallel to the better-known Pilgrims' Way route. An area of around 235 hectares (580 acres) of ancient woodland is owned and managed by the Woodland Trust. This land was purchased by the trust in 1997 in order to preserve woodland, hedgerow and chalk grassland habitats and landscapes. A car park and a series of walks and bridleways are provided at the site.

A small radio transmitting station previously used by the military as part of the NATO ACE High relay communications system and more recently by mobile telephone companies is situated on farmland to the west of Hucking (51°17′45″N 0°36′51″E) on account of its clear, unobstructed position high on the North Downs. The facility now lies unstaffed. However, despite the existence of mobile telephone technology at the transmitting station site, cellular network signal quality in the village remains poor.

Racehorse trainer John Best trains his horses from Scragged Oak Farm in Hucking. His Hucking Horses syndicate is named for the village.

== See also ==
- Listed buildings in Hucking
