= Nettlestead Place =

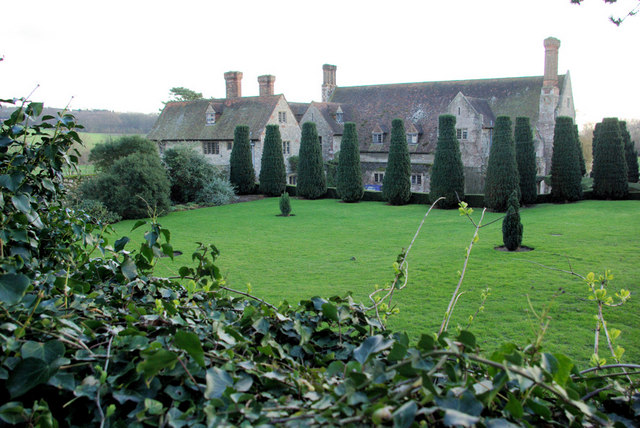
- The north side of Nettlestead Place

- Location within Kent
- 51.242678°N 0.413112°E
- Type: Manor House
- Location: Nettlestead

Site notes
- Area: Kent

Listed Building – Grade I
- Official name: Nettlestead Place
- Designated: 23 May 1967
- Reference no.: 1344436

Listed Building – Grade I
- Official name: The Gatehouse, Nettlestead Place
- Designated: 25 July 1952
- Reference no.: 1060648

Nettlestead Place is a country house in Nettlestead, Kent, England. The house and its gatehouse are each separately Grade I listed buildings.

== Buildings ==
The construction of Nettlestead Place began c. 1250–60 with additions added c. 1438 and c. 1589 and in the 1920s. The two-storey house is built of local ragstone, galletted on the ground floor of the main section and more randomly coursed on the first floor. The 15th- and 20th-century extensions are without galletting. Having been used for two centuries as an oast house, it was restored and extended for use as a house in the 1920s.

The main wing of the house, aligned east–west, is the oldest part and contains the original 13th-century construction with the 15th-century extension on its eastern end. The south elevation, facing a square pond, is divided into four unequal sections by projecting bays probably constructed as garderobes with small windows at the first floor. the sections between the projections feature a series of five 15th-century paired windows at first floor with moulded stone architraves and mullions. Smaller windows occur in the ground floor, and at the east (right) end of the wing is a doorway over which stone carvings of shields carry the date "AD 1589". The west and east ends of the wing are gabled, with the west end rebuilt as part of the 1920s works which included chimney stacks added at both ends of the wing. On the east end, the 1920s extension is two storeys with an attic floor, but with lower eaves and ridge heights and dormer windows. It is slightly set back from the earlier wing.

The 1920s construction extends north as a two-storey east wing with the attic floor and dormer windows continuing. It terminates with a short north wing set at a right angle, each end of which is gabled. On the north side of the original wing, at its junction with the east wing is a gabled 1920s stair turret probably occupying the location of an earlier stair turret. The north side of the original wing features a pair of two-storey gabled bays set in from the ends, between which the roof continues down to eaves above the ground floor. Internally, the older part of the house contains a number of original structural features including moulded details to window surrounds and 13th- and 15th-century doorways.

The early 14th-century gatehouse stands to the west of the house at the start of the private drive. It is a two-storey structure with a roughly coursed ragstone ground floor and a half-timbered first floor jettied to the west and spanning the roadway on timber Bressumer beams. The roof is of clay tiles and is gabletted and features crown post construction.

== See also ==
- St Mary's Church, Nettlestead, neighbouring church
- Grade I listed buildings in Maidstone
