= Listed buildings in Thurnham, Kent =

Civil Parish in Kent, England

Thurnham is a village and civil parish in the Borough of Maidstone of Kent, England It contains two grade I and 23 grade II listed buildings that are recorded in the National Heritage List for England.

This list is based on the information retrieved online from Historic England.

== Key ==
Grade	Criteria
I	Buildings that are of exceptional interest
II*	Particularly important buildings of more than special interest
II	Buildings that are of special interest

== Listing ==
Name	Grade	Location	Type	Completed (Note: The date given is the date used by Historic England as significant for the initial building or that of an important part in the structure's description.)	Date designated	Grid ref. (Note: The grid reference is based on the British national grid reference system, sometimes known as OSGB36, used by the Ordnance Survey.) Geo-coordinates	Notes	Entry number (Note: The "List Entry Number" is a unique number assigned to each listed building and scheduled monument by Historic England.)	Image	Wikidata
Bimbury Manor	II				26 April 1968	TQ8118960200; 51°18′43″N 0°35′54″E		1336262	Upload Photo	Q26620773
Chrismill Manor	II	Ashford Road			20 July 1984	TQ8133055087; 51°15′58″N 0°35′52″E		1086204	Upload Photo	Q26376197
Nether Milgate	II	Ashford Road, Milgate Park			20 July 1984	TQ8084554991; 51°15′55″N 0°35′27″E		1116483	Upload Photo	Q26410089
The Coach House	II	Ashford Road, Milgate Park			20 July 1984	TQ8079454672; 51°15′45″N 0°35′24″E		1116436	Upload Photo	Q26410050
Barn Circa 35 Yards North of Barty Farmhouse	II	Barty Lane			20 July 1984	TQ8096655701; 51°16′18″N 0°35′34″E		1116406	Upload Photo	Q26410021
Chapel Lane Farmhouse	II	Chapel Lane, Ware Street			20 July 1984	TQ7940956467; 51°16′45″N 0°34′16″E		1336263	Upload Photo	Q26620774
Howe Court	II	Chrismill Lane			20 July 1984	TQ8186756106; 51°16′30″N 0°36′22″E		1116410	Upload Photo	Q26410025
Black Horse Public House	II	Pilgrims Way	hotel		20 July 1984	TQ8065257869; 51°17′29″N 0°35′22″E		1319950	Black Horse Public House More images	Q26606002
Castlebank	II	Pilgrims Way			20 July 1984	TQ8062857894; 51°17′30″N 0°35′21″E		1086163	Upload Photo	Q26376034
Thornham Friars and Barn Attached to West	II	Pilgrims Way			20 July 1984	TQ8068057858; 51°17′28″N 0°35′24″E		1086205	Upload Photo	Q26376200
Church of St Mary the Virgin	I	Thurnham Lane	church building		26 April 1968	TQ8040957642; 51°17′22″N 0°35′09″E		1086165	Church of St Mary the Virgin More images	Q7594665
Court Farm	II	Thurnham Lane			20 July 1984	TQ8024857270; 51°17′10″N 0°35′00″E		1086164	Upload Photo	Q26376041
Head Stone Circa 7 Yards North of North Porch of Church of St Mary the Virgin	II	Thurnham Lane			20 July 1984	TQ8041357660; 51°17′22″N 0°35′09″E		1086170	Upload Photo	Q94534473
Table Tomb Circa 2 Yards North of Chancel of Church of St Mary the Virgin	II	Thurnham Lane			20 July 1984	TQ8042157644; 51°17′22″N 0°35′10″E		1116282	Upload Photo	Q94534475
Table Tomb Circa 3 Yards South East of Chancel of Church of St Mary the Virgin	II	Thurnham Lane			20 July 1984	TQ8041857627; 51°17′21″N 0°35′10″E		1086167	Upload Photo	Q94534470
Table Tomb Circa 5 Yards North West of North Porch	II	Thurnham Lane			20 July 1984	TQ8040757659; 51°17′22″N 0°35′09″E		1320014	Upload Photo	Q26606059
Table Tomb Circa 6 Yards North of Chancel of St Mary the Virgin	II	Thurnham Lane			20 July 1984	TQ8042457653; 51°17′22″N 0°35′10″E		1086168	Upload Photo	Q26376047
Table Tomb Circa 6 Yards North of North Chapel of Church of St Mary the Virgin	II	Thurnham Lane			20 July 1984	TQ8041757655; 51°17′22″N 0°35′10″E		1116289	Upload Photo	Q94534476
Table Tomb Circa 7 Yards North of North Chapel of Church of St Mary the Virgin	II	Thurnham Lane			20 July 1984	TQ8041957659; 51°17′22″N 0°35′10″E		1086169	Upload Photo	Q94534472
Table Tomb to Edward Watts and Others, Circa 3 Yards North of Chancel of Church of St Mary the Virgin	II	Circa 3 Yards North Of Chancel Of Church Of St Mary The Virgin, Thurnham Lane			20 July 1984	TQ8042257647; 51°17′22″N 0°35′10″E		1319997	Upload Photo	Q94534479
Table Tomb to Lott Circa 4 Yards North West of North Porch of Church of St Mary the Virgin	II	Thurnham Lane			20 July 1984	TQ8040657656; 51°17′22″N 0°35′09″E		1336284	Upload Photo	Q94534481
Table Tomb to Richard Watts Circa 4 Yards North of Chancel of Church of St Mary the Virgin	II	Thurnham Lane			20 July 1984	TQ8042357650; 51°17′22″N 0°35′10″E		1086166	Upload Photo	Q94534468
Table Tomb to Watts Family Circa 3 Yards North of Chancel of Church of St Mary the Virgin	II	Thurnham Lane			20 July 1984	TQ8041857649; 51°17′22″N 0°35′10″E		1116325	Upload Photo	Q94534478
Thurnham Court	II	Thurnham Lane			20 October 1952	TQ8044657548; 51°17′19″N 0°35′11″E		1319970	Upload Photo	Q26606020
Milgate House, Tudor Milgate and Brewers House.	I	Tudor Milgate And Brewers House, Ashford Road, Milgate Park			26 April 1968	TQ8078454720; 51°15′47″N 0°35′23″E		1086203	Upload Photo	Q6851789

== See also ==
- Grade I listed buildings in Kent
- Grade II* listed buildings in Kent

== Sources ==
- Newman, John (2012) [1969], Kent: West and the Weald, The Buildings of England, New Haven and London: Yale University Press, ISBN 978-0-300-18509-6
