= Listed buildings in West Farleigh =

Civil Parish in Kent, England

West Farleigh is a village and civil parish in the Borough of Maidstone of Kent, England It contains three grade I and 24 grade II listed buildings that are recorded in the National Heritage List for England.

This list is based on the information retrieved online from Historic England.

== Key ==
Grade	Criteria
I	Buildings that are of exceptional interest
II*	Particularly important buildings of more than special interest
II	Buildings that are of special interest

== Listing ==
Name	Grade	Location	Type	Completed (Note: The date given is the date used by Historic England as significant for the initial building or that of an important part in the structure's description.)	Date designated	Grid ref. (Note: The grid reference is based on the British national grid reference system, sometimes known as OSGB36, used by the Ordnance Survey.) Geo-coordinates	Notes	Entry number (Note: The "List Entry Number" is a unique number assigned to each listed building and scheduled monument by Historic England.)	Image	Wikidata
1 and 2, Charlton Lane (see Details for Further Address Information)	II	1 and 2, Charlton Lane, Farleigh Green			30 April 1976	TQ7212752594; 51°14′48″N 0°27′53″E		1060650	Upload Photo	Q26313804
1 and 2, the Hollow (see Details for Further Address Information)	II	1 and 2, Charlton Lane			14 October 1987	TQ7205252699; 51°14′51″N 0°27′50″E		1320108	Upload Photo	Q26606146
Elmscroft and Garden Wall Attached to North West Corner	II	Charlton Lane			23 May 1967	TQ7209352952; 51°14′59″N 0°27′52″E		1320121	Upload Photo	Q26606157
Barn Immediately West South West of Gardeners Cottage at Ewell Manor	II	Ewell Lane			15 October 1995	TQ7163652368; 51°14′41″N 0°27′28″E		1253790	Upload Photo	Q26545514
Doves Cottage	II	Ewell Lane			14 October 1987	TQ7129952569; 51°14′48″N 0°27′11″E		1320134	Upload Photo	Q26606168
Wall Enclosing Garden of West Farleigh Hall	II	Ewell Lane			14 October 1987	TQ7132052644; 51°14′50″N 0°27′12″E		1115805	Upload Photo	Q96276710
Thatched House	II	Heath Road			14 October 1987	TQ7224552076; 51°14′31″N 0°27′59″E		1060651	Upload Photo	Q26313806
Former Stables About 60 Metres North West of Tutsham Hall	II	Hunt Lane			14 October 1987	TQ7058152634; 51°14′51″N 0°26′34″E		1060652	Upload Photo	Q26313807
Tutsham Hall	II	Hunt Lane			14 October 1987	TQ7061252569; 51°14′48″N 0°26′35″E		1344439	Upload Photo	Q26628161
Marshall's Cottages (south Block)	II	Hunt Street			14 October 1987	TQ7042852159; 51°14′35″N 0°26′25″E		1116063	Upload Photo	Q26409721
Church of All Saints	I	Lower Road	church building		23 May 1967	TQ7155853501; 51°15′18″N 0°27′26″E		1060613	Church of All Saints More images	Q4729539
Court Lodge and Attached Outbuilding to North West	II	Lower Road			23 May 1967	TQ7172453527; 51°15′18″N 0°27′34″E		1060612	Upload Photo	Q26313762
K6 Telephone Kiosk Outside the Chequers Public House	II	Lower Road, (b2010)			21 March 1989	TQ7131252674; 51°14′51″N 0°27′11″E		1069020	Upload Photo	Q26321710
Monument to Amy Charlton About 7 Metres North of Chancel of Church of All Saints	II	Lower Road			14 October 1987	TQ7157153516; 51°15′18″N 0°27′26″E		1344423	Upload Photo	Q95116979
Monument to Augustine Hodges(?) About 1 1/2 Metres East of Chancel of Church of All Saints	II	Lower Road			14 October 1987	TQ7157553504; 51°15′18″N 0°27′26″E		1060615	Upload Photo	Q95116977
Monument to John Gibbons About 13 Metres East of Chancel of Church of All Saints	II	Lower Road			14 October 1987	TQ7159053513; 51°15′18″N 0°27′27″E		1344424	Upload Photo	Q95116981
Monument to John Siles Charlton About 9 Metres North East of Church of All Saints	II	Lower Road			14 October 1987	TQ7157553517; 51°15′18″N 0°27′26″E		1060614	Upload Photo	Q95116974
Monument to Susan Olive About 5 1/2 Metres North of Chancel of Church of All Saints	II	Lower Road			14 October 1987	TQ7156453511; 51°15′18″N 0°27′26″E		1060616	Upload Photo	Q95116978
Mounting Block About 16 Metres South South West of the Old Parsonage	II	Lower Road			23 May 1967	TQ7136452931; 51°14′59″N 0°27′15″E		1115774	Upload Photo	Q26409464
The Old Parsonage	II	Lower Road			23 May 1967	TQ7137352947; 51°15′00″N 0°27′15″E		1060653	Upload Photo	Q26313809
The Tickled Trout	II	Lower Road, ME15 0PE			14 October 1987	TQ7130852689; 51°14′52″N 0°27′11″E		1060617	Upload Photo	Q26313763
West Farleigh Hall	I	Lower Road	English country house		27 July 1952	TQ7133252611; 51°14′49″N 0°27′12″E		1116033	West Farleigh Hall More images	Q7985143
Smith's Croft	II	Smiths Hill			14 October 1987	TQ7127752576; 51°14′48″N 0°27′10″E		1115684	Upload Photo	Q26409382
Boundary Cottage Midway Cottage St Helens Corner	II	St Helens Lane			14 October 1987	TQ7233253533; 51°15′18″N 0°28′06″E		1060618	Upload Photo	Q26313765
Mill Cottages	II	1-7, Tutsham Farm			14 October 1987	TQ7088352911; 51°14′59″N 0°26′50″E		1115689	Upload Photo	Q26409387
Garden House, West Farleigh Hall	II	West Farleigh Hall, Lower Road			23 May 1967	TQ7134652575; 51°14′48″N 0°27′13″E		1344440	Upload Photo	Q96276714

== See also ==
- Grade I listed buildings in Kent
- Grade II* listed buildings in Kent

== Sources ==
- Newman, John (2012) [1969], Kent: West and the Weald, The Buildings of England, New Haven and London: Yale University Press, ISBN 978-0-300-18509-6
