= Listed buildings in Leeds, Kent =

Historic structures in Kent, England

Leeds is a village and civil parish in the Borough of Maidstone of Kent, England It contains one grade I, four grade II* and 65 grade II listed buildings that are recorded in the National Heritage List for England.

This list is based on the information retrieved online from Historic England.

== Key ==
Grade	Criteria
I	Buildings that are of exceptional interest
II*	Particularly important buildings of more than special interest
II	Buildings that are of special interest

== Listing ==
Name	Grade	Location	Type	Completed (Note: The date given is the date used by Historic England as significant for the initial building or that of an important part in the structure's description.)	Date designated	Grid ref. (Note: The grid reference is based on the British national grid reference system, sometimes known as OSGB36, used by the Ordnance Survey.) Geo-coordinates	Notes	Entry number (Note: The "List Entry Number" is a unique number assigned to each listed building and scheduled monument by Historic England.)	Image	Wikidata
2 Lower Ashbank Cottages Ash Cottage Lower Ashbank	II	Ahsbank			26 April 1968	TQ8279053468; 51°15′04″N 0°37′04″E		1185559	Upload Photo	Q26480877
Ashbank Cottage	II	3, Ashbank			14 December 1984	TQ8276853425; 51°15′03″N 0°37′03″E		1299631	Upload Photo	Q26587011
Rose Cottage	II	Ashbank			14 December 1984	TQ8274153436; 51°15′03″N 0°37′02″E		1086160	Upload Photo	Q26376017
Elnothington Cottages	II	1 and 2, Ashford Road			27 September 1978	TQ8303754239; 51°15′29″N 0°37′18″E		1060823	Upload Photo	Q26313984
Elnothington House and Front Garden Walls Attached	II	Ashford Road			26 April 1968	TQ8305454231; 51°15′28″N 0°37′19″E		1367043	Upload Photo	Q26648577
Stable and Approximately 30 Metres of Garden Wall to Elnothington House	II	Ashford Road			27 September 1978	TQ8310854212; 51°15′28″N 0°37′22″E		1086161	Upload Photo	Q26376023
The Lodge and Gatepiers Attached (pair of Gatepiers and Flanking Lodges)	II	Ashford Road			14 December 1984	TQ8321954133; 51°15′25″N 0°37′28″E		1185561	Upload Photo	Q26480881
Weir Cottage (at TQ 831 536 in the Grounds of Leeds Castle)	II	Ashford Road			14 December 1984	TQ8312353648; 51°15′09″N 0°37′22″E		1086162	Upload Photo	Q26376028
Arnold Farmhouse	II	Back Street			14 December 1984	TQ8116652686; 51°14′40″N 0°35′39″E		1336282	Upload Photo	Q26620789
Arnold Hill Cottage	II	Back Street			14 December 1984	TQ8127953163; 51°14′56″N 0°35′46″E		1336302	Upload Photo	Q26620803
Arnoldbrae	II	Back Street			14 December 1984	TQ8119252854; 51°14′46″N 0°35′41″E		1299602	Upload Photo	Q26586986
Barn Circa 2 Yards North of Arnold Farmhouse	II	Back Street			14 December 1984	TQ8117352701; 51°14′41″N 0°35′40″E		1086119	Upload Photo	Q26375833
Battel Hall	II*	Burberry Lane			20 October 1952	TQ8276953308; 51°14′59″N 0°37′03″E		1336303	Upload Photo	Q17545361
Battel Hall Cottages	II	1 and 2, Burberry Lane			26 April 1968	TQ8281453403; 51°15′02″N 0°37′05″E		1086120	Upload Photo	Q26375837
Oast Circa 13 Yards South East of Battel Hall	II	Burberry Lane			14 December 1984	TQ8277453279; 51°14′58″N 0°37′03″E		1086121	Upload Photo	Q26375843
Agricultural Barn at Fulling Mill Farm	II	Caring Lane			27 March 1986	TQ8115554042; 51°15′24″N 0°35′41″E		1060932	Upload Photo	Q26314079
Bridge at Fulling Mill Farm to North West of Farmhouse	II	Caring Lane			15 February 1988	TQ8115954014; 51°15′23″N 0°35′41″E		1344276	Upload Photo	Q26628012
Fulling Mill Farmhouse	II	Caring Lane			26 April 1968	TQ8117053995; 51°15′23″N 0°35′42″E		1086122	Upload Photo	Q26375849
Caring House	II	Caring Road			26 April 1968	TQ8062154040; 51°15′25″N 0°35′14″E		1086123	Upload Photo	Q26375855
Old Caring	II	Caring Road			14 December 1984	TQ8056054061; 51°15′26″N 0°35′11″E		1086124	Upload Photo	Q26375859
The Tower House, Including Attached Walls and Service Wing	II				3 May 1993	TQ8178752943; 51°14′48″N 0°36′12″E		1253150	Upload Photo	Q26544939
Abbey Farmhouse	II	Lower Street			26 April 1968	TQ8219853045; 51°14′51″N 0°36′33″E		1299572	Upload Photo	Q26586961
Abbey Mill House	II	Lower Street			20 October 1952	TQ8231253124; 51°14′53″N 0°36′39″E		1185669	Upload Photo	Q26480978
Brook House	II	Lower Street			26 April 1968	TQ8234653173; 51°14′55″N 0°36′41″E		1299560	Upload Photo	Q26586951
Church of St Nicholas	I	Lower Street			26 April 1968	TQ8254153335; 51°15′00″N 0°36′51″E		1086125	Church of St Nicholas More images	Q7594942
Empire Cottage Gallery	II	3, Lower Street			26 April 1968	TQ8235753192; 51°14′55″N 0°36′42″E		1086134	Upload Photo	Q26375885
Foley Farm Cottage	II	Lower Street			26 April 1968	TQ8232653201; 51°14′56″N 0°36′40″E		1185785	Upload Photo	Q26481084
Foley Farmhouse	II	Lower Street			26 April 1968	TQ8223653153; 51°14′54″N 0°36′35″E		1086135	Upload Photo	Q26375891
Foley Oast	II	Lower Street			14 December 1984	TQ8232253244; 51°14′57″N 0°36′40″E		1336307	Upload Photo	Q26620806
Larger Dovecote at TQ 822 529 in Grounds of Former Leeds Priory	II	Lower Street			20 October 1952	TQ8223052910; 51°14′46″N 0°36′34″E		1185691	Upload Photo	Q26481000
Lower Flat Oast View Supply Stores Supply Stores House Upper Flat Oast View	II	Lower Street			26 April 1968	TQ8237953213; 51°14′56″N 0°36′43″E		1185761	Upload Photo	Q26481061
Manor House	II*	Lower Street			20 October 1952	TQ8233053165; 51°14′55″N 0°36′40″E		1336304	Manor House More images	Q17545365
Monument to Mr Thomas Porter Circa 17 Yards South East of South Chapel of Church of St Nicholas	II	Lower Street			14 December 1984	TQ8258053319; 51°14′59″N 0°36′53″E		1086127	Upload Photo	Q96098737
Monument to Richard Saxby of Caring	II	2 Yards South East of South Chapel of Church of St Nicholas			14 December 1984	TQ8256053327; 51°15′00″N 0°36′52″E		1299596	Upload Photo	Q96098729
Outbuilding Circa 3 Yards North West of Abbey Mill House	II	Lower Street			14 December 1984	TQ8231553143; 51°14′54″N 0°36′39″E		1086131	Upload Photo	Q26375869
Slype at TQ 823 529 in Grounds of Former Leeds Priory	II	Lower Street			26 April 1968	TQ8234252955; 51°14′48″N 0°36′40″E		1336305	Upload Photo	Q26620804
Smaller Dovecote at TQ 822 529 in Grounds of Former Leeds Priory	II	Lower Street			14 December 1984	TQ8223052900; 51°14′46″N 0°36′34″E		1086132	Upload Photo	Q26375875
Stanley Cottages	II	1 and 2, Lower Street			26 April 1968	TQ8241153244; 51°14′57″N 0°36′44″E		1086133	Upload Photo	Q26375880
Table Tomb Circa 12 Yards East of South Chapel of Church of St Nicholas	II	Lower Street			14 December 1984	TQ8257553334; 51°15′00″N 0°36′53″E		1185639	Upload Photo	Q96098733
Table Tomb One Foot East of Chancel of Church of St Nicholas	II	Lower Street			14 December 1984	TQ8255953338; 51°15′00″N 0°36′52″E		1086129	Upload Photo	Q96098735
Table Tomb One Yard East of South Chapel of Church of St Nicholas	II	Lower Street			14 December 1984	TQ8255853332; 51°15′00″N 0°36′52″E		1086128	Upload Photo	Q96098736
Table Tomb to John Homewood Circa 12 Yards North West of West Tower of Church of St Nicholas	II	Lower Street			14 December 1984	TQ8251353354; 51°15′01″N 0°36′50″E		1086126	Upload Photo	Q96098739
The George Inn	II	Lower Street			26 April 1968	TQ8236953171; 51°14′55″N 0°36′42″E		1086130	The George Inn More images	Q26375864
The Old Bakery	II	Lower Street			26 April 1968	TQ8239953238; 51°14′57″N 0°36′44″E		1336306	Upload Photo	Q26620805
Wall Monument to Elizabeth Meredith on East (outside) Wall of North Chapel of Church of St Nicholas	II	Lower Street			14 December 1984	TQ8255553343; 51°15′00″N 0°36′52″E		1299593	Upload Photo	Q96098732
Wall to South East of Abbey Farmhouse	II	Lower Street			20 August 1986	TQ8222852941; 51°14′48″N 0°36′34″E		1344275	Upload Photo	Q26628011
Woodbine Cottage	II	Lower Street			26 April 1968	TQ8233853196; 51°14′56″N 0°36′41″E		1185775	Upload Photo	Q26481074
Barn Circa 10 Yards South East of Brogden Farmhouse	II	Old Mill Road			14 December 1984	TQ8187853226; 51°14′57″N 0°36′17″E		1336308	Upload Photo	Q26620807
Brogden Farm Cottages	II	1 and 2, Old Mill Road			14 December 1984	TQ8183253284; 51°14′59″N 0°36′15″E		1086136	Upload Photo	Q26375896
Brogden Farmhouse	II	Old Mill Road			14 December 1984	TQ8187253250; 51°14′58″N 0°36′17″E		1185789	Upload Photo	Q26481088
Barns Circa 4 Yards South East of Spout House	II	Spout Hill			14 December 1984	TQ8113653591; 51°15′10″N 0°35′39″E		1086137	Upload Photo	Q26375903
Cordwainers	II*	Spout Hill			26 April 1968	TQ8099553622; 51°15′11″N 0°35′32″E		1185805	Upload Photo	Q17545218
Cordwainers Cottage	II	Spout Hill			26 April 1968	TQ8102453626; 51°15′11″N 0°35′34″E		1336309	Upload Photo	Q26620808
Merriams Farm Cottages	II	1, 2 and 3, Spout Hill			20 October 1952	TQ8094353629; 51°15′11″N 0°35′29″E		1299486	Upload Photo	Q26586885
Spout House	II	Spout Hill			14 December 1984	TQ8110853607; 51°15′10″N 0°35′38″E		1185799	Upload Photo	Q26481096
Burnt Barn Farm House	II	Upper Street			26 April 1968	TQ8177552297; 51°14′27″N 0°36′10″E		1086138	Upload Photo	Q26375908
Chapel Cottages	II	1-4, Upper Street			26 April 1968	TQ8187352492; 51°14′33″N 0°36′15″E		1086102	Upload Photo	Q26375769
Churchill Cottages	II	1, 2, 3, 4 and 5, Upper Street			14 December 1984	TQ8192452562; 51°14′36″N 0°36′18″E		1086139	Upload Photo	Q26375912
Forge House	II	Upper Street			14 December 1984	TQ8202552945; 51°14′48″N 0°36′24″E		1299464	Upload Photo	Q26586864
Fox Cottage	II	Upper Street			14 December 1984	TQ8200952876; 51°14′46″N 0°36′23″E		1336311	Upload Photo	Q26620809
Gambia Cottages	II	1 and 2, Upper Street			14 December 1984	TQ8199552818; 51°14′44″N 0°36′22″E		1336331	Upload Photo	Q26620826
Ledian Farmhouse	II	Upper Street			26 April 1968	TQ8196552740; 51°14′41″N 0°36′20″E		1086101	Upload Photo	Q26375764
Leeds Stores	II	Upper Street			14 December 1984	TQ8199852829; 51°14′44″N 0°36′22″E		1299476	Upload Photo	Q26586875
Little Foxes	II	Upper Street			14 December 1984	TQ8201352935; 51°14′48″N 0°36′23″E		1086140	Upload Photo	Q26375917
Milstead Cottage	II	Upper Street			26 April 1968	TQ8200752887; 51°14′46″N 0°36′23″E		1185877	Upload Photo	Q26481170
Oasts Circa 3 Yards South of Tower Cottage	II	Upper Street			14 December 1984	TQ8197652802; 51°14′43″N 0°36′21″E		1086100	Upload Photo	Q26375759
The Old Post Office	II	Upper Street			26 April 1968	TQ8198452774; 51°14′42″N 0°36′22″E		1336332	Upload Photo	Q26620827
Tower Cottage	II	Upper Street			14 December 1984	TQ8199452806; 51°14′43″N 0°36′22″E		1086099	Upload Photo	Q26375754
Vineys Cottages	II*	1 and 2, Upper Street			20 October 1952	TQ8195152621; 51°14′37″N 0°36′20″E		1336310	Vineys Cottages More images	Q17545370
Yew Tree House	II	Upper Street			14 December 1984	TQ8197652711; 51°14′40″N 0°36′21″E		1185834	Upload Photo	Q26481128

== See also ==
- Grade I listed buildings in Kent
- Grade II* listed buildings in Kent

== Sources ==
- Newman, John (2012) [1969], Kent: West and the Weald, The Buildings of England, New Haven and London: Yale University Press, ISBN 978-0-300-18509-6
