= Listed buildings in Headcorn =

Historic structures in Kent, England

Headcorn is a village and civil parish in the Borough of Maidstone of Kent, England It contains one grade I, three grade II* and 85 grade II listed buildings that are recorded in the National Heritage List for England.

This list is based on the information retrieved online from Historic England.

== Key ==
Grade	Criteria
I	Buildings that are of exceptional interest
II*	Particularly important buildings of more than special interest
II	Buildings that are of special interest

== Listing ==
Name	Grade	Location	Type	Completed (Note: The date given is the date used by Historic England as significant for the initial building or that of an important part in the structure's description.)	Date designated	Grid ref. (Note: The grid reference is based on the British national grid reference system, sometimes known as OSGB36, used by the Ordnance Survey.) Geo-coordinates	Notes	Entry number (Note: The "List Entry Number" is a unique number assigned to each listed building and scheduled monument by Historic England.)	Image	Wikidata
America Farmhouse	II				21 October 1986	TQ8441541639; 51°08′40″N 0°38′06″E		1344321	Upload Photo	Q26628054
Church of St Peter and St Paul	I				26 April 1968	TQ8318244204; 51°10′04″N 0°37′08″E		1049057	Church of St Peter and St Paul More images	Q7595341
Table Tomb About 10 Metres East of Chancel of Church of St Peter and St Paul	II				21 October 1986	TQ8320844207; 51°10′04″N 0°37′09″E		1051046	Upload Photo	Q96099879
Table Tomb About 2 Metres South of South Chapel of Church of St Peter and St Paul	II				21 October 1986	TQ8319144195; 51°10′04″N 0°37′08″E		1049035	Upload Photo	Q96099880
Table Tomb About 5 Metres South of South Chapel of Church of St Peter and St Paul	II				21 October 1986	TQ8319844193; 51°10′04″N 0°37′08″E		1060868	Upload Photo	Q96099867
Table Tomb About 5 Metres South of South Porch of Church of St Peter and St Paul	II				21 October 1986	TQ8317744189; 51°10′03″N 0°37′07″E		1060867	Upload Photo	Q96099871
New Bridge	II	Biddenden Road			21 October 1986	TQ8418343459; 51°09′39″N 0°37′58″E		1372888	Upload Photo	Q26653935
Wick Farmhouse	II	Biddenden Road			26 April 1968	TQ8461743715; 51°09′46″N 0°38′20″E		1060869	Upload Photo	Q26314019
Petite Cottage, Bless Cottage and Weavers Cottage	II	Bless Cottage And Weavers Cottage, Church Walk			21 October 1986	TQ8325144242; 51°10′05″N 0°37′11″E		1060832	Upload Photo	Q26313993
Bletchenden	II	Bletchenden Road, TN27 9JB			26 April 1968	TQ8380843018; 51°09′25″N 0°37′38″E		1051058	Upload Photo	Q26302977
Bletchenden Place	II	Bletchenden Road			21 October 1986	TQ8389742982; 51°09′24″N 0°37′42″E		1372892	Upload Photo	Q26653939
Fairmeadow House	II	Bletchenden Road			21 October 1986	TQ8390342912; 51°09′21″N 0°37′42″E		1060830	Upload Photo	Q26313991
Granary About 11 Metres North-west of Bletchenden	II	Bletchenden Road			21 October 1986	TQ8379943041; 51°09′26″N 0°37′37″E		1344322	Upload Photo	Q26628055
1,2,3,4, Church Walk	II	1, 2, 3, 4, Church Walk			21 October 1986	TQ8328544249; 51°10′05″N 0°37′13″E		1060831	Upload Photo	Q26313992
9 and 10, Church Walk	II	9 and 10, Church Walk			26 April 1968	TQ8322144245; 51°10′05″N 0°37′10″E		1060833	Upload Photo	Q26313994
Glebe Cottage Heron Cottage Church Cottage	II	13, Church Walk			26 April 1968	TQ8319844247; 51°10′05″N 0°37′08″E		1060834	Upload Photo	Q26313995
Headcorn Manor	II*	Church Walk			20 October 1952	TQ8312944229; 51°10′05″N 0°37′05″E		1060835	Upload Photo	Q17545012
L.a. Burden, Corn and Seeds the Beams Restaurant	II	Corn And Seeds, 39, High Street			26 April 1968	TQ8344544231; 51°10′04″N 0°37′21″E		1039879	Upload Photo	Q26291670
Hearnden Farmhouse	II	East Sutton Road			21 October 1986	TQ8259646470; 51°11′18″N 0°36′42″E		1344341	Upload Photo	Q26628073
Little Hearnden	II	East Sutton Road			26 April 1968	TQ8267146541; 51°11′20″N 0°36′46″E		1060836	Upload Photo	Q26313996
1-5, Forge Lane	II	1-5, Forge Lane			21 October 1986	TQ8350644253; 51°10′05″N 0°37′24″E		1060837	Upload Photo	Q26313997
Four Oaks	II	Four Oaks Road, Hawkenbury			31 July 1986	TQ8124945452; 51°10′46″N 0°35′30″E		1372080	Upload Photo	Q26653206
Kelsham Farmhouse	II*	Four Oaks Road, Hawkenbury			26 April 1968	TQ8145044385; 51°10′12″N 0°35′39″E		1060838	Upload Photo	Q17545021
Mounting Block and Path About 4 Metres North West of Kelsham Farmhouse	II	Four Oaks Road, Hawkenbury			21 October 1986	TQ8143944390; 51°10′12″N 0°35′38″E		1039941	Upload Photo	Q26291741
Oast House About 10 Metres East of Kelsham Farmhouse	II	Four Oaks Road, Hawkenbury			21 October 1986	TQ8148044381; 51°10′12″N 0°35′40″E		1344343	Upload Photo	Q26628075
Barn About 8 Metres North West of Grigg Farmhouse*	II	Grigg Lane			21 October 1986	TQ8525544925; 51°10′25″N 0°38′55″E		1344342	Upload Photo	Q26628074
Grigg Farmhouse	II	Grigg Lane			26 April 1968	TQ8527544914; 51°10′24″N 0°38′56″E		1372078	Upload Photo	Q26653204
Little Grigg Farmhouse	II	Grigg Lane			21 October 1986	TQ8551545051; 51°10′29″N 0°39′09″E		1049081	Upload Photo	Q26301136
Barn About 20 Metres South West of Hawkenbury Farmhouse	II	Hawkenbury Road, Hawkenbury			21 October 1986	TQ8057445126; 51°10′37″N 0°34′55″E		1039917	Upload Photo	Q26291713
Boarden Farmhouse	II	Hawkenbury Road, Hawkenbury			26 April 1968	TQ8091844904; 51°10′29″N 0°35′12″E		1060839	Upload Photo	Q26313998
Hawkenbury Bridge	II	Hawkenbury Road, Hawkenbury			21 October 1986	TQ7990044515; 51°10′18″N 0°34′19″E		1372105	Upload Photo	Q26648967
Hawkenbury Farmhouse	II	Hawkenbury Road, Hawkenbury			26 April 1968	TQ8061045149; 51°10′37″N 0°34′57″E		1344344	Upload Photo	Q26628076
Little Hawkenbury	II	Hawkenbury Road, Little Hawkenbury			21 October 1986	TQ8017744789; 51°10′26″N 0°34′34″E		1060840	Upload Photo	Q26313999
21-25, High Street	II	21-25, High Street			10 May 1971	TQ8337344234; 51°10′05″N 0°37′17″E		1344345	Upload Photo	Q26628077
31, High Street	II	31, High Street			21 October 1986	TQ8342244237; 51°10′05″N 0°37′20″E		1372126	Upload Photo	Q26653254
53-57, High Street	II	53-57, High Street			21 October 1986	TQ8349444225; 51°10′04″N 0°37′24″E		1054691	Upload Photo	Q26306350
6-18, High Street	II	6-18, High Street			21 October 1986	TQ8333144191; 51°10′03″N 0°37′15″E		1060844	Upload Photo	Q26314003
69, High Street	II	69, High Street			21 October 1986	TQ8355044201; 51°10′03″N 0°37′26″E		1060843	Upload Photo	Q26314002
Chequers	II	High Street			26 April 1968	TQ8336444195; 51°10′03″N 0°37′17″E		1054005	Upload Photo	Q26305691
Hubble's Stores Post Office	II	26, High Street			26 April 1968	TQ8340444206; 51°10′04″N 0°37′19″E		1054015	Upload Photo	Q26305702
Manor Cottages and Pump Attached	II	71, High Street			26 April 1968	TQ8357544193; 51°10′03″N 0°37′28″E		1367141	Upload Photo	Q26648664
Manor Farmhouse	II	High Street			26 April 1968	TQ8349244193; 51°10′03″N 0°37′23″E		1344309	Upload Photo	Q26628044
Mortley and the Village Shop	II	High Street			21 October 1986	TQ8333944233; 51°10′05″N 0°37′16″E		1060841	Upload Photo	Q26314000
Oldfield Polly Anna	II	45, High Street			21 October 1986	TQ8346344228; 51°10′04″N 0°37′22″E		1344307	Upload Photo	Q26628042
Pump Adjacent to No 30	II	High Street			21 October 1986	TQ8343644209; 51°10′04″N 0°37′21″E		1187127	Upload Photo	Q26482352
Railings and Gate About 2 Metres North of Manor Farmhouse	II	High Street			21 October 1986	TQ8349344201; 51°10′03″N 0°37′24″E		1054054	Upload Photo	Q26305737
Rushford Manor	II	High Street			26 April 1968	TQ8351244180; 51°10′03″N 0°37′24″E		1060846	Upload Photo	Q26314005
Shakespeare House and Path Between Front Door and High Street	II	High Street			26 April 1968	TQ8335144192; 51°10′03″N 0°37′16″E		1344308	Upload Photo	Q26628043
The Institute	II	15-19, High Street			21 October 1986	TQ8335744233; 51°10′05″N 0°37′17″E		1039865	Upload Photo	Q26291657
The Kings Arms Inn and Shop Adjoining to Right	II	High Street			10 July 1973	TQ8332244235; 51°10′05″N 0°37′15″E		1372096	Upload Photo	Q26653222
The Old Vicarage	II	High Street			21 October 1986	TQ8338344197; 51°10′03″N 0°37′18″E		1060845	Upload Photo	Q26314004
The Mortgage Shop, Lloyds Bank and Ap Davis, Chemist	II	33-37, High Street			21 October 1986	TQ8343444232; 51°10′04″N 0°37′21″E		1060842	Upload Photo	Q26314001
Homestall Farmhouse	II	Love Lane			26 April 1968	TQ8496244177; 51°10′01″N 0°38′39″E		1054059	Upload Photo	Q26305742
Luckhurst Farmhouse	II	Love Lane			21 October 1986	TQ8549144151; 51°09′59″N 0°39′06″E		1060847	Upload Photo	Q26314006
Barn About 73 Metres South West of Moatenden Priory	II	Maidstone Road, Hawkenbury			21 October 1986	TQ8183146342; 51°11′15″N 0°36′02″E		1344310	Upload Photo	Q26628045
Barn at Tq 829 449	II	Maidstone Road			5 March 1985	TQ8294044954; 51°10′28″N 0°36′56″E		1054090	Upload Photo	Q26305771
Moatenden Priory	II	Maidstone Road, Hawkenbury			26 April 1968	TQ8188946407; 51°11′17″N 0°36′05″E		1367452	Upload Photo	Q99889725
1 and 2, Moat Road	II	1 and 2, Moat Road			21 October 1986	TQ8324344351; 51°10′09″N 0°37′11″E		1187069	Upload Photo	Q26482305
The Moat	II	Moat Road			26 April 1968	TQ8306944367; 51°10′09″N 0°37′02″E		1060848	Upload Photo	Q26314007
Forstal Farmhouse	II	Newhouse Lane			21 October 1986	TQ8279743787; 51°09′51″N 0°36′47″E		1344311	Upload Photo	Q26628046
Cloth Hall	II*	North Street			20 October 1986	TQ8329544254; 51°10′05″N 0°37′13″E		1344312	Cloth Hall More images	Q17545390
Old Plumtrees	II	Plumtree Road			21 October 1986	TQ8211545626; 51°10′51″N 0°36′15″E		1187167	Upload Photo	Q26482389
Shenley House	II	Shenley Road			26 April 1968	TQ8484342770; 51°09′16″N 0°38′30″E		1060809	Upload Photo	Q26313969
Former Toll House at Tq 842 441	II	Smarden Road			21 October 1986	TQ8420944096; 51°09′59″N 0°38′00″E		1060811	Upload Photo	Q26313971
Little East End Farmhouse	II	Smarden Road			21 October 1986	TQ8478443936; 51°09′53″N 0°38′29″E		1060810	Upload Photo	Q26313970
The Baptist Chapel	II	Station Road			26 April 1968	TQ8360944200; 51°10′03″N 0°37′29″E		1060812	Upload Photo	Q26313972
The Manse	II	Station Road			21 October 1986	TQ8362944186; 51°10′03″N 0°37′30″E		1060813	Upload Photo	Q26313973
Little Ulcombe	II	Stickfast Lane			17 December 1974	TQ8355547349; 51°11′45″N 0°37′32″E		1060814	Upload Photo	Q26313974
Ramhurst Farmhouse	II	Stone Stile Road			21 October 1986	TQ8241645214; 51°10′37″N 0°36′30″E		1344330	Upload Photo	Q26628062
Maltmans	II	Tattlebury Lane			21 October 1986	TQ8288245534; 51°10′47″N 0°36′55″E		1060815	Upload Photo	Q26313975
Barn About 20 Metres North East of Great Tong	II	Tong Lane			21 October 1986	TQ8323746507; 51°11′18″N 0°37′15″E		1344332	Upload Photo	Q26628064
Barn About 30 Metres South West of Little Tong	II	Tong Lane			21 October 1986	TQ8333946727; 51°11′25″N 0°37′20″E		1060816	Upload Photo	Q26313976
Barn About 4 Metres East of Great Tong	II	Tong Lane			21 October 1986	TQ8326346481; 51°11′17″N 0°37′16″E		1370026	Upload Photo	Q26651289
Granary About 4 Metress West of Great Tong	II	Tong Lane			21 October 1986	TQ8321846476; 51°11′17″N 0°37′14″E		1060818	Upload Photo	Q26313978
Great Tong	II	Tong Lane			26 April 1968	TQ8323146487; 51°11′18″N 0°37′14″E		1060817	Upload Photo	Q26313977
Little Tong	II	Tong Lane			21 October 1986	TQ8337646727; 51°11′25″N 0°37′22″E		1370022	Upload Photo	Q26651285
Oasthouse About 5 Metres North West of Great Tong	II	Tong Lane			21 October 1986	TQ8320646491; 51°11′18″N 0°37′13″E		1045870	Upload Photo	Q26297978
Pheasant Farmhouse	II	Tong Lane			26 April 1968	TQ8359647227; 51°11′41″N 0°37′34″E		1344331	Upload Photo	Q26628063
Hazelpits Farmhouse	II	Ulcombe Road			21 October 1986	TQ8331144885; 51°10′26″N 0°37′15″E		1060819	Upload Photo	Q26313979
Little Tilden	II	Ulcombe Road			26 April 1968	TQ8371645591; 51°10′48″N 0°37′38″E		1370046	Upload Photo	Q26651306
Oasthouse About 10 Metres North of Tilden	II	Ulcombe Road			21 October 1986	TQ8362945417; 51°10′43″N 0°37′33″E		1344333	Upload Photo	Q26628065
Tilden	II	Ulcombe Road			26 April 1968	TQ8361045377; 51°10′41″N 0°37′32″E		1045860	Upload Photo	Q26297969
Headcorn Place	II	Water Lane			26 April 1968	TQ8186043837; 51°09′54″N 0°35′59″E		1344334	Upload Photo	Q26628066
Place Farmhouse	II	Water Lane			26 April 1968	TQ8178043839; 51°09′54″N 0°35′55″E		1060821	Upload Photo	Q26313981
Stephens Bridge	II	Water Lane			20 October 1952	TQ8260044350; 51°10′09″N 0°36′38″E		1370047	Upload Photo	Q26651307
Trumpeter	II	Water Lane			15 July 1985	TQ8233243697; 51°09′48″N 0°36′23″E		1045836	Upload Photo	Q26297942
Water Lane Cottages	II	1 and 2, Water Lane			21 October 1986	TQ8233543727; 51°09′49″N 0°36′23″E		1060820	Upload Photo	Q26313980
Vine Farmhouse	II	Waterman Quarter			21 October 1986	TQ8361242466; 51°09′07″N 0°37′26″E		1370036	Upload Photo	Q26651298
16 and 18, Wheeler Street	II	16 and 18, Wheeler Street			5 August 1981	TQ8400744122; 51°10′00″N 0°37′50″E		1344335	Upload Photo	Q26628067

== See also ==
- Grade I listed buildings in Kent
- Grade II* listed buildings in Kent

== Sources ==
- Newman, John (2012) [1969], Kent: West and the Weald, The Buildings of England, New Haven and London: Yale University Press, ISBN 978-0-300-18509-6
