= Listed buildings in Hunton, Kent =

Civil Parish in Kent, England

Hunton is a village and civil parish in the Borough of Maidstone of Kent, England It contains one grade I, four grade II* and 66 grade II listed buildings that are recorded in the National Heritage List for England.

This list is based on the information retrieved online from Historic England.

== Key ==
Grade	Criteria
I	Buildings that are of exceptional interest
II*	Particularly important buildings of more than special interest
II	Buildings that are of special interest

== Listing ==
Name	Grade	Location	Type	Completed (Note: The date given is the date used by Historic England as significant for the initial building or that of an important part in the structure's description.)	Date designated	Grid ref. (Note: The grid reference is based on the British national grid reference system, sometimes known as OSGB36, used by the Ordnance Survey.) Geo-coordinates	Notes	Entry number (Note: The "List Entry Number" is a unique number assigned to each listed building and scheduled monument by Historic England.)	Image	Wikidata
Oast House Cottage and Weavers	II				26 February 1987	TQ7238350782; 51°13′49″N 0°28′03″E		1263621	Upload Photo	Q26554400
Park View and Old Timbers	II				26 February 1987	TQ7269250226; 51°13′30″N 0°28′18″E		1249857	Upload Photo	Q26541952
Bishops House	II	1 and 2, Bishops Lane			26 February 1987	TQ7199148876; 51°12′47″N 0°27′40″E		1249724	Upload Photo	Q26541832
Bishops Oast	II	Bishops Lane			3 October 1977	TQ7201748867; 51°12′47″N 0°27′41″E		1249723	Upload Photo	Q26541831
Petty Hoo	II	Bishops Lane			26 February 1987	TQ7232848784; 51°12′44″N 0°27′57″E		1249721	Upload Photo	Q26541829
The Bishops Cottage	II	Bishops Lane			26 February 1987	TQ7203148852; 51°12′47″N 0°27′42″E		1249722	Upload Photo	Q26541830
Barn About 20 Metres North of Stonewall Farmhouse	II	East Street			26 February 1987	TQ7291248995; 51°12′50″N 0°28′28″E		1249782	Upload Photo	Q26541884
Bridge House	II	East Street			7 August 2000	TQ7293348784; 51°12′43″N 0°28′28″E		1381397	Upload Photo	Q26661507
Bull Oast	II	East Street			15 November 1977	TQ7286049178; 51°12′56″N 0°28′25″E		1249784	Upload Photo	Q26541886
Clapper House and Pump	II	East Street			25 July 1952	TQ7299448888; 51°12′47″N 0°28′32″E		1249748	Upload Photo	Q26541854
Clock House Farm House	II	East Street			23 May 1967	TQ7291149219; 51°12′58″N 0°28′28″E		1249787	Upload Photo	Q26541889
Hunton Place	II	East Street			23 May 1967	TQ7301149331; 51°13′01″N 0°28′33″E		1249737	Upload Photo	Q26541843
Stonewall Farmhouse Mounting Block and Garden Wall to East	II*	East Street			25 July 1952	TQ7291448954; 51°12′49″N 0°28′28″E		1249763	Stonewall Farmhouse Mounting Block and Garden Wall to East More images	Q17545253
The Old Bull House	II	East Street			26 February 1987	TQ7295948925; 51°12′48″N 0°28′30″E		1263605	Upload Photo	Q26554384
The Roundels	II	East Street			26 February 1987	TQ7297548879; 51°12′47″N 0°28′31″E		1263574	Upload Photo	Q26554353
The Stores	II	East Street			26 February 1987	TQ7298649379; 51°13′03″N 0°28′32″E		1249788	Upload Photo	Q26541890
Cart Shed Adjoining Hemsley Cottage to South East	II	George Street			11 November 1975	TQ7303048980; 51°12′50″N 0°28′34″E		1263553	Upload Photo	Q26554333
Hemsley Cottage	II	George Street			11 November 1975	TQ7302648989; 51°12′50″N 0°28′33″E		1249796	Upload Photo	Q26541897
Martins Farmhouse	II	George Street			26 February 1987	TQ7309249114; 51°12′54″N 0°28′37″E		1249810	Upload Photo	Q26541910
Numbers 1 and 2 Hemsley Cottages	II	1 and 2 Hemsley Cottages, George Street			11 November 1975	TQ7301648970; 51°12′49″N 0°28′33″E		1263588	Upload Photo	Q26554367
Grove Farm House	II	Grove Lane			23 May 1967	TQ7150249472; 51°13′07″N 0°27′16″E		1249827	Upload Photo	Q26541926
Grove Lodge	II	Grove Lane			26 February 1987	TQ7161949425; 51°13′06″N 0°27′22″E		1263568	Upload Photo	Q26554348
Southover	II	Grove Lane			26 February 1987	TQ7156849520; 51°13′09″N 0°27′19″E		1249821	Upload Photo	Q26541921
The Woolhouse	II	Grove Lane			26 February 1987	TQ7148849519; 51°13′09″N 0°27′15″E		1263559	Upload Photo	Q26554339
Clock Tower House	II	Hunton Hill			26 February 1987	TQ7248150438; 51°13′37″N 0°28′08″E		1249873	Upload Photo	Q26541966
Gennings	II	Hunton Hill			5 December 1984	TQ7251350406; 51°13′36″N 0°28′09″E		1249859	Upload Photo	Q26541954
South Lodge	II	Hunton Hill			26 February 1987	TQ7267150165; 51°13′28″N 0°28′17″E		1249880	Upload Photo	Q26541973
The Old Post Office and Forge Cottage	II	Hunton Hill			26 February 1987	TQ7268550198; 51°13′29″N 0°28′18″E		1249847	Upload Photo	Q26541943
Elm Corner Farmhouse	II	Redwall Lane			26 February 1987	TQ7325049425; 51°13′04″N 0°28′46″E		1263518	Upload Photo	Q26554303
Barn About 50 Metres South East of Buston Manor	II*	Shingle Barn Lane			23 May 1967	TQ7134650908; 51°13′54″N 0°27′10″E		1249915	Upload Photo	Q17545267
Buston Manor	II*	Shingle Barn Lane			25 July 1952	TQ7129050959; 51°13′56″N 0°27′07″E		1249912	Buston Manor More images	Q17545258
Granary About 40 Metres South East of Buston Manor	II*	Shingle Barn Lane			23 May 1967	TQ7133850921; 51°13′54″N 0°27′10″E		1249914	Upload Photo	Q17545262
Barn About 100 Metres North West of Cheveney Farm Cottages	II	Vicarage Road			26 February 1987	TQ7092850070; 51°13′27″N 0°26′47″E		1249926	Upload Photo	Q26542013
Cheveney	II	Vicarage Road			25 July 1952	TQ7054749863; 51°13′21″N 0°26′27″E		1249928	Upload Photo	Q26542015
Cheveney Farm Cottages	II	Vicarage Road			26 February 1987	TQ7099050034; 51°13′26″N 0°26′50″E		1249924	Upload Photo	Q26542011
Hammond Cottages and Former Barn and Oasthouses Attached	II	1 and 2, Vicarage Road			26 February 1987	TQ7086149842; 51°13′20″N 0°26′43″E		1249921	Upload Photo	Q26542008
Hammonds Cottage	II	Vicarage Road			26 February 1987	TQ7086049857; 51°13′20″N 0°26′43″E		1249918	Upload Photo	Q26542005
Elphicks Farmhouse	II	Water Lane			23 May 1967	TQ7139548641; 51°12′41″N 0°27′09″E		1249944	Upload Photo	Q26542030
Fosters Cottage	II	Water Lane			26 February 1987	TQ7147048632; 51°12′40″N 0°27′13″E		1249940	Upload Photo	Q26542026
Oast House About 60 Metres South West of Elphicks Farmhouse	II	Water Lane			26 February 1987	TQ7134048598; 51°12′39″N 0°27′06″E		1249953	Upload Photo	Q26542036
Shepards Cottages	II	1 and 2, Water Lane			26 February 1987	TQ7158148555; 51°12′38″N 0°27′18″E		1263513	Upload Photo	Q26554299
Water Place	II	Water Lane			26 February 1987	TQ7180048735; 51°12′43″N 0°27′30″E		1249937	Upload Photo	Q26542023
South Lodge, Wall and Gatepiers	II	West Street			26 February 1987	TQ7204249457; 51°13′06″N 0°27′44″E		1250016	Upload Photo	Q26542096
Church of St Mary	I	West Street			23 May 1967	TQ7241949751; 51°13′15″N 0°28′03″E		1250030	Church of St Mary More images	Q7594353
Durrants	II	West Street			23 May 1967	TQ7160349120; 51°12′56″N 0°27′20″E		1250013	Upload Photo	Q26542093
Durrants Cottages Elphick Farm Cottages	II	1 and 2, West Street			26 February 1987	TQ7153949202; 51°12′59″N 0°27′17″E		1263492	Upload Photo	Q26554278
Former Barn About 100 Metres North East of Hunton Court	II	West Street			20 March 1984	TQ7257449657; 51°13′12″N 0°28′11″E		1250168	Upload Photo	Q26542236
Former Coachhouse and Flats About 40 Metres North East of Hunton Court and Paved Yard Adjoining to West	II	West Street			26 February 1987	TQ7252649643; 51°13′12″N 0°28′09″E		1250153	Upload Photo	Q26542221
Former Stables About 50 Metres North North Eas to Hunton Court and Paved Yard Adjoining to South	II	West Street			26 February 1987	TQ7251249666; 51°13′12″N 0°28′08″E		1250141	Upload Photo	Q26542210
Hunton Court	II	West Street			25 July 1952	TQ7245849620; 51°13′11″N 0°28′05″E		1250127	Upload Photo	Q26542197
Monument About 11 Metres West of Tower of Church of St Mary	II	West Street			26 February 1987	TQ7239749760; 51°13′16″N 0°28′02″E		1250123	Upload Photo	Q26542193
Monument About 2 Metres South of South Aisle of Church of St Mary	II	West Street			26 February 1987	TQ7241749742; 51°13′15″N 0°28′03″E		1250125	Upload Photo	Q26542195
Monument About 4 Metres West of North West Buttress of Tower of Church of St Mary	II	West Street			26 February 1987	TQ7240249762; 51°13′16″N 0°28′03″E		1250119	Upload Photo	Q26542189
Monument About 5 Metres West of Tower of Church of St Mary	II	West Street			26 February 1987	TQ7240149756; 51°13′15″N 0°28′03″E		1263400	Upload Photo	Q26554192
Monument About 6 Metres West of West Door of Tower of Church of St Mary	II	West Street			26 February 1987	TQ7240049756; 51°13′15″N 0°28′02″E		1250120	Upload Photo	Q26542190
Monument to Ann Bishop About 10 Metres West of Tower of Church of St Mary	II	West Street			26 February 1987	TQ7239849758; 51°13′16″N 0°28′02″E		1263455	Upload Photo	Q26554245
Monument to Bishop About 6 Metres West of Tower of Church of St Mary	II	West Street			26 February 1987	TQ7240149758; 51°13′16″N 0°28′03″E		1263419	Upload Photo	Q26554210
Monument to Henry Catlet About 15 Metres North West of Tower of Church of St Mary	II	West Street			26 February 1987	TQ7239849776; 51°13′16″N 0°28′02″E		1263424	Upload Photo	Q26554215
Monument to James Allen About 3 Metres East of Chancel of Church of St Mary	II	West Street			26 February 1987	TQ7243749749; 51°13′15″N 0°28′04″E		1250055	Upload Photo	Q26542130
Monument to James Bishop About 10 Metres West of Tower of Church of St Mary	II	West Street			26 February 1987	TQ7239849761; 51°13′16″N 0°28′02″E		1250079	Upload Photo	Q26542153
Monument to Mary Bisset About 7 Metres West of South West Buttress of Tower of Church of St Mary	II	West Street			26 February 1987	TQ7240049753; 51°13′15″N 0°28′02″E		1250091	Upload Photo	Q26542164
Monument to Mary Snatt About 5 Metres South of South Aisle of Church of St Mary	II	West Street			26 February 1987	TQ7241749740; 51°13′15″N 0°28′03″E		1250118	Upload Photo	Q26542188
Monument to Paul Beeston About 12 Metres South of South Chapel of Church of St Mary	II	West Street			26 February 1987	TQ7242449732; 51°13′15″N 0°28′04″E		1250059	Upload Photo	Q26542134
Monument to Richard Beeston About 10 Metres South of South Chapel of Church of St Mary	II	West Street			26 February 1987	TQ7242449735; 51°13′15″N 0°28′04″E		1250073	Upload Photo	Q26542147
Monument to Samuel Hovenden About 6 Metres East of South Chapel of Church of St Mary	II	West Street			26 February 1987	TQ7243649742; 51°13′15″N 0°28′04″E		1250098	Upload Photo	Q26542171
Monument to Thomas Newman About 13 Metres North of Chancel of Church of St Mary	II	West Street			26 February 1987	TQ7243649764; 51°13′16″N 0°28′04″E		1250107	Upload Photo	Q26542179
Monument to William Bisset (?) About 7 Metres West of South West Buttress of Church of St Mary	II	West Street			26 February 1987	TQ7239949752; 51°13′15″N 0°28′02″E		1250094	Upload Photo	Q26542167
Pandora	II	West Street			26 February 1987	TQ7103549369; 51°13′04″N 0°26′52″E		1249961	Upload Photo	Q26542043
Scotts House	II	West Street			26 February 1987	TQ7171649324; 51°13′02″N 0°27′27″E		1249965	Upload Photo	Q26542046
The Church Cottage	II	West Street			26 February 1987	TQ7238349758; 51°13′16″N 0°28′02″E		1263466	Upload Photo	Q26554255
Wall and Gate Piers About 5 Metres North East of South Lodge	II	West Street			26 February 1987	TQ7205349472; 51°13′07″N 0°27′44″E		1250019	Upload Photo	Q26542099

== See also ==
- Grade I listed buildings in Kent
- Grade II* listed buildings in Kent

== Sources ==
- Newman, John (2012) [1969], Kent: West and the Weald, The Buildings of England, New Haven and London: Yale University Press, ISBN 978-0-300-18509-6
