= Listed buildings in Wormshill =

Civil Parish in Kent, England

Wormshill is a village and civil parish in the Borough of Maidstone of Kent, England It contains 14 grade II listed buildings that are recorded in the National Heritage List for England.

This list is based on the information retrieved online from Historic England.

== Key ==
Grade	Criteria
I	Buildings that are of exceptional interest
II*	Particularly important buildings of more than special interest
II	Buildings that are of special interest

== Listing ==
Name	Grade	Location	Type	Completed (Note: The date given is the date used by Historic England as significant for the initial building or that of an important part in the structure's description.)	Date designated	Grid ref. (Note: The grid reference is based on the British national grid reference system, sometimes known as OSGB36, used by the Ordnance Survey.) Geo-coordinates	Notes	Entry number (Note: The "List Entry Number" is a unique number assigned to each listed building and scheduled monument by Historic England.)	Image	Wikidata
Saywell Farmhouse	II				14 December 1984	TQ8744757525; 51°17′10″N 0°41′12″E		1115622	Upload Photo	Q26409323
Bedmonton House	II	Bedmonton			1 December 1998	TQ8759158189; 51°17′31″N 0°41′21″E		1271965	Upload Photo	Q26561847
Bedmonton Manor Farmhouse	II	Bedmonton			14 December 1984	TQ8735357817; 51°17′19″N 0°41′08″E		1344253	Upload Photo	Q26627991
Norwood Farmhouse	II	Bottom Pond Road			26 April 1968	TQ8891658223; 51°17′30″N 0°42′29″E		1060970	Upload Photo	Q26314111
Woodman's	II	Bottom Pond Road			14 December 1984	TQ8892058290; 51°17′33″N 0°42′29″E		1320348	Upload Photo	Q26606356
The Ringlestone Inn	II	Ringlestone Road	pub		21 October 1986	TQ8791155764; 51°16′12″N 0°41′33″E		1060802	The Ringlestone Inn More images	Q7334917
Blacksmith's Cottage	II	The Street			14 December 1984	TQ8783057120; 51°16′56″N 0°41′31″E		1320372	Upload Photo	Q26606375
Church of St Giles	II	The Street	church building		26 April 1968	TQ8818657448; 51°17′06″N 0°41′50″E		1060971	Church of St Giles More images	Q7593271
Home Farm Cottage	II	The Street			26 April 1968	TQ8806357405; 51°17′05″N 0°41′43″E		1344255	Upload Photo	Q26627993
K6 Telephone Kiosk	II	The Street			27 July 1988	TQ8808257379; 51°17′04″N 0°41′44″E		1261917	Upload Photo	Q26552831
Old Post Office	II	The Street			26 April 1968	TQ8807057359; 51°17′04″N 0°41′44″E		1115578	Upload Photo	Q26409285
The Blacksmith's Arms Public House	II	The Street	pub		14 December 1984	TQ8786057090; 51°16′55″N 0°41′32″E		1060972	The Blacksmith's Arms Public House More images	Q26314113
The Old Rectory	II	The Street			26 April 1968	TQ8814957393; 51°17′05″N 0°41′48″E		1344254	Upload Photo	Q26627992
Yew Tree Farmhouse	II	The Street			26 April 1968	TQ8782357026; 51°16′53″N 0°41′30″E		1115583	Upload Photo	Q26409290

== See also ==
- Grade I listed buildings in Kent
- Grade II* listed buildings in Kent

== Sources ==
- Newman, John (2012) [1969], Kent: West and the Weald, The Buildings of England, New Haven and London: Yale University Press, ISBN 978-0-300-18509-6
