= Listed buildings in Hucking =

Historic structures in Kent, England

Hucking is a hamlet and civil parish in the Borough of Maidstone of Kent, England It contains eight grade II listed buildings that are recorded in the National Heritage List for England.

This list is based on the information retrieved online from Historic England.

== Key ==
Grade	Criteria
I	Buildings that are of exceptional interest
II*	Particularly important buildings of more than special interest
II	Buildings that are of special interest

== Listing ==
Name	Grade	Location	Type	Completed (Note: The date given is the date used by Historic England as significant for the initial building or that of an important part in the structure's description.)	Date designated	Grid ref. (Note: The grid reference is based on the British national grid reference system, sometimes known as OSGB36, used by the Ordnance Survey.) Geo-coordinates	Notes	Entry number (Note: The "List Entry Number" is a unique number assigned to each listed building and scheduled monument by Historic England.)	Image	Wikidata
Brooms Hall	II	Broad Street Hill			20 July 1984	TQ8364157392; 51°17′10″N 0°37′55″E		1336294	Upload Photo	Q26620795
Church of St Margaret	II	Church Road			26 April 1968	TQ8447658273; 51°17′37″N 0°38′40″E		1086186	Church of St Margaret More images	Q26376117
Headstone to ?williamson Circa 6 Yards West of Church of St Margaret	II	Church Road			20 July 1984	TQ8446058272; 51°17′37″N 0°38′39″E		1086187	Upload Photo	Q26376121
Headstone to Elizabeth Seers Circa 6 Yards West of Church of St Margaret	II	Church Road			20 July 1984	TQ8446158279; 51°17′38″N 0°38′39″E		1336295	Upload Photo	Q26620796
Hucking Court Farmhouse and Hucking Court Cottage	II	Church Road			26 April 1968	TQ8442658293; 51°17′38″N 0°38′38″E		1086188	Upload Photo	Q26376125
Old Forge Farmhouse	II	Old Forge Lane			20 July 1984	TQ8467359233; 51°18′08″N 0°38′52″E		1086189	Upload Photo	Q26376131
Pond Farmhouse	II	Pond Farm Road			20 July 1984	TQ8391358651; 51°17′50″N 0°38′12″E		1086190	Upload Photo	Q26376137
Scragged Oak Farmhouse	II	Scragged Oak Road			20 July 1984	TQ8323757665; 51°17′19″N 0°37′35″E		1086191	Upload Photo	Q26376143

== See also ==
- Grade I listed buildings in Kent
- Grade II* listed buildings in Kent

== Sources ==
- Newman, John (2012) [1969], Kent: West and the Weald, The Buildings of England, New Haven and London: Yale University Press, ISBN 978-0-300-18509-6
