= Listed buildings in Nettlestead, Kent =

Historic structures in Kent, England

Nettlestead is a village and civil parish in the Borough of Maidstone of Kent, England It contains three grade I and ten grade II listed buildings that are recorded in the National Heritage List for England.

This list is based on the information retrieved online from Historic England.

== Key ==
| Grade | Criteria |
|---|---|
| I | Buildings that are of exceptional interest |
| II* | Particularly important buildings of more than special interest |
| II | Buildings that are of special interest |

== Listing ==
| Name | Grade | Location | Type | Completed (Note: The date given is the date used by Historic England as significant for the initial building or that of an important part in the structure's description.) | Date designated | Grid ref. (Note: The grid reference is based on the British national grid reference system, sometimes known as OSGB36, used by the Ordnance Survey.) Geo-coordinates | Notes | Entry number (Note: The "List Entry Number" is a unique number assigned to each listed building and scheduled monument by Historic England.) | Image | Wikidata |
|---|---|---|---|---|---|---|---|---|---|---|
| Wateringbury Signal Box | II | | | | 18 July 2013 | TQ6906252788; 51°14′57″N 0°25′16″E | | 1414978 | Wateringbury Signal Box More images | Q26676425 |
| Hop Pickers' Huts at Rock Farm | II | Gibbs Hill, ME18 5HT | | | 3 June 2019 | TQ6826252667; 51°14′54″N 0°24′34″E | | 1464856 | Upload Photo | Q66480218 |
| Rock Farm House | II | Gibbs Hill | | | 14 October 1987 | TQ6818052613; 51°14′52″N 0°24′30″E | | 1060643 | Upload Photo | Q26313799 |
| Hawthorne Cottage | II | Hampstead Lane | | | 14 October 1987 | TQ6836350158; 51°13′33″N 0°24′35″E | | 1060644 | Upload Photo | Q26313801 |
| Brymeade Green Farm Cottage | II | Maidstone Road, Nettlestead Green | | | 14 October 1987 | TQ6822851030; 51°14′01″N 0°24′30″E | | 1344437 | Upload Photo | Q26628159 |
| Church of St Mary | I | Maidstone Road | | | 23 May 1967 | TQ6850752124; 51°14′36″N 0°24′46″E | | 1060645 | Church of St Mary More images | Q7594391 |
| Forge Cottages | II | Maidstone Road, Nettlestead Green | | | 14 October 1987 | TQ6812550852; 51°13′56″N 0°24′24″E | | 1344438 | Upload Photo | Q26628160 |
| Monument About 3 Metres West of Tower of Church of St Mary | II | Maidstone Road | | | 14 October 1987 | TQ6848852125; 51°14′36″N 0°24′45″E | | 1060647 | Upload Photo | Q96096400 |
| Monument to Hannah Comber About 16 Metres South of Chancel of Church of St Mary | II | Maidstone Road | | | 14 October 1987 | TQ6852052099; 51°14′35″N 0°24′47″E | | 1344435 | Upload Photo | Q96096399 |
| Monument to Margaret Fowll About 1.5 Metres South of Tower of Church of St Mary | II | Maidstone Road | | | 14 October 1987 | TQ6849752117; 51°14′36″N 0°24′45″E | | 1060646 | Upload Photo | Q96096402 |
| Nettlestead Green House | II | Maidstone Road, Nettlestead Green | | | 23 May 1967 | TQ6822651131; 51°14′04″N 0°24′30″E | | 1060649 | Upload Photo | Q26313803 |
| Nettlestead Place | I | Maidstone Road | | | 23 May 1967 | TQ6853352044; 51°14′34″N 0°24′47″E | | 1344436 | Nettlestead Place More images | Q12063773 |
| The Gatehouse | I | Nettlestead Place, Maidstone Road, ME18 5HA | | | 25 July 1952 | TQ6843552066; 51°14′34″N 0°24′42″E | | 1060648 | Upload Photo | Q96282711 |

== See also ==
- Grade I listed buildings in Kent
- Grade II* listed buildings in Kent

== Sources ==
- Newman, John (2012) [1969], Kent: West and the Weald, The Buildings of England, New Haven and London: Yale University Press, ISBN 978-0-300-18509-6
