= Listed buildings in Bearsted =

Civil Parish in Kent, England

Bearsted is a village and civil parish in the Borough of Maidstone of Kent, England It contains one grade I and 58 grade II listed buildings that are recorded in the National Heritage List for England.

This list is based on the information retrieved online from Historic England.

== Key ==
Grade	Criteria
I	Buildings that are of exceptional interest
II*	Particularly important buildings of more than special interest
II	Buildings that are of special interest

== Listing ==
Name	Grade	Location	Type	Completed (Note: The date given is the date used by Historic England as significant for the initial building or that of an important part in the structure's description.)	Date designated	Grid ref. (Note: The grid reference is based on the British national grid reference system, sometimes known as OSGB36, used by the Ordnance Survey.) Geo-coordinates	Notes	Entry number (Note: The "List Entry Number" is a unique number assigned to each listed building and scheduled monument by Historic England.)	Image	Wikidata
Gore Cottage	II				23 May 1967	TQ8037455365; 51°16′08″N 0°35′03″E		1336247	Upload Photo	Q26620760
111, Ashford Road	II	111, Ashford Road			20 July 1984	TQ7933655250; 51°16′05″N 0°34′10″E		1086252	Upload Photo	Q26376401
Church of the Holy Cross	I	Church Lane			23 May 1967	TQ8011055509; 51°16′13″N 0°34′50″E		1086253	Church of the Holy Cross More images	Q12053115
Corner Cottage Hazel Cottage	II	1, Church Lane			20 July 1984	TQ8005755736; 51°16′20″N 0°34′48″E		1086258	Upload Photo	Q26376412
Maybank	II	Church Lane			23 May 1967	TQ8003155756; 51°16′21″N 0°34′46″E		1086259	Upload Photo	Q26376418
Mote House	II	Church Lane			20 July 1984	TQ8008955459; 51°16′11″N 0°34′49″E		1086257	Upload Photo	Q26376407
Table Tomb 2 Yards South East of Porch of Church of the Holy Cross	II	Church Lane			20 July 1984	TQ8010555498; 51°16′13″N 0°34′50″E		1336248	Upload Photo	Q96280324
Table Tomb Packman Family 1 Yard East of Vestry of Church of the Holy Cross	II	Church Lane			20 July 1984	TQ8011655498; 51°16′13″N 0°34′50″E		1086255	Upload Photo	Q96280344
Table Tomb of Duckelbery Family Immediately South of Vestry of Church of the Holy Cross	II	Church Lane			20 July 1984	TQ8011055491; 51°16′12″N 0°34′50″E		1086254	Upload Photo	Q96280358
War Memorial North West of Church of the Holy Cross	II	Church Lane			20 July 1984	TQ8011455529; 51°16′14″N 0°34′50″E		1086256	Upload Photo	Q96280280
Colegate Drive No 1	II	1, Colegate Drive			20 July 1984	TQ8009755968; 51°16′28″N 0°34′50″E		1299731	Upload Photo	Q26587100
Baxter's Cottage, Eden Cottage and Oak Apple Cottage	II	The Street, ME14 4EW			13 November 1973	TQ8023155855; 51°16′24″N 0°34′57″E		1185389	Upload Photo	Q26480705
Fauchons House	II	54, Fauchons Lane, Roseacre			23 May 1967	TQ7886755680; 51°16′20″N 0°33′46″E		1086260	Upload Photo	Q26376422
K6 Telephone Kiosk	II	Opposite The White Horse Public House			17 February 1989	TQ8001856008; 51°16′29″N 0°34′46″E		1254138	Upload Photo	Q26545823
Byfrance	II	Otham Lane			20 July 1984	TQ8027854707; 51°15′47″N 0°34′57″E		1185352	Upload Photo	Q26480667
Little Millgate	II	Otham Lane			20 July 1984	TQ8014154771; 51°15′49″N 0°34′50″E		1336252	Upload Photo	Q26620764
34, Plantation Lane	II	34, Plantation Lane			20 July 1984	TQ7928255448; 51°16′12″N 0°34′07″E		1299682	Upload Photo	Q26587056
9 and 11, Plantation Lane	II	9 and 11, Plantation Lane			20 July 1984	TQ7915255514; 51°16′14″N 0°34′01″E		1185361	Upload Photo	Q26480677
The Old Plantation	II	33, Plantation Lane			25 July 1952	TQ7927655492; 51°16′13″N 0°34′07″E		1086266	Upload Photo	Q26376454
19, Roseacre Lane	II	19, Roseacre Lane			20 July 1984	TQ7933255437; 51°16′12″N 0°34′10″E		1086267	Upload Photo	Q26376460
21, Roseacre Lane	II	21, Roseacre Lane			20 July 1984	TQ7933855447; 51°16′12″N 0°34′10″E		1185386	Upload Photo	Q26480703
28, 30 and 32, Roseacre Lane	II	28, 30 and 32, Roseacre Lane			20 July 1984	TQ7938355431; 51°16′11″N 0°34′12″E		1185373	Upload Photo	Q26480690
6, 8 and 10, Roseacre Lane	II	6, 8 and 10, Roseacre Lane			20 July 1984	TQ7933855308; 51°16′07″N 0°34′10″E		1336253	Upload Photo	Q26620765
Barty House	II	Roundwell, ME14 4HN			26 April 1968	TQ8076355470; 51°16′11″N 0°35′24″E		1116403	Upload Photo	Q26410018
Pump Immediately West of Junction with Sutton Street	II	Roundwell			20 July 1984	TQ8061255600; 51°16′15″N 0°35′16″E		1086268	Upload Photo	Q26376466
Roundwell	II	Roundwell			26 April 1968	TQ8062855579; 51°16′15″N 0°35′17″E		1336283	Upload Photo	Q26620790
Wright Cottage	II	Roundwell			26 April 1968	TQ8064155570; 51°16′14″N 0°35′17″E		1319967	Upload Photo	Q26606017
Sutton House and Barn Adjoining	II	Sutton Street			20 July 1984	TQ8052755466; 51°16′11″N 0°35′11″E		1185436	Upload Photo	Q26480752
The Old Cottage	II	Sutton Street			20 July 1984	TQ8059955598; 51°16′15″N 0°35′15″E		1336255	Upload Photo	Q26620767
April Cottage and Old Timbers	II	The Green, ME14 4DN			23 May 1967	TQ8007855971; 51°16′28″N 0°34′49″E		1086263	Upload Photo	Q26376439
Bearsted Cottage	II	The Green			23 May 1967	TQ7992155867; 51°16′25″N 0°34′41″E		1086262	Upload Photo	Q26376434
Bearsted House	II	The Green, Maidstone Kent, ME14 4EB			23 May 1967	TQ8009655773; 51°16′22″N 0°34′50″E		1336249	Upload Photo	Q26620761
Bell House	II	The Green			25 July 1952	TQ8001455805; 51°16′23″N 0°34′46″E		1185244	Upload Photo	Q26480558
Black Horse Oast and Bryony Oast the Oasts	II	3 and 4, The Green			24 May 1976	TQ8018455775; 51°16′21″N 0°34′54″E		1185218	Upload Photo	Q26480532
Crisfield House	II	The Green			20 July 1984	TQ8017455896; 51°16′25″N 0°34′54″E		1086265	Upload Photo	Q26376450
Forge Cottages	II	1, 2 and 3, The Green			20 July 1984	TQ8014955912; 51°16′26″N 0°34′53″E		1185346	Upload Photo	Q26480661
Ivy House	II	The Green			20 July 1984	TQ8006355989; 51°16′29″N 0°34′48″E		1299725	Upload Photo	Q26587095
Mote Hall Oast and Hop Kiln Oast the Oasts	II	1 and 2, The Green			24 May 1976	TQ8016655792; 51°16′22″N 0°34′53″E		1086261	Upload Photo	Q26376428
Olde Manor Cottages the Old Manor House	II	1, The Green			25 July 1952	TQ8009855955; 51°16′27″N 0°34′50″E		1336251	Upload Photo	Q26620763
Snowfield Cottage	II	The Green			23 May 1967	TQ7994455920; 51°16′26″N 0°34′42″E		1185278	Upload Photo	Q26480591
The Limes	II	The Green			23 May 1967	TQ8011055949; 51°16′27″N 0°34′51″E		1086264	Upload Photo	Q26376445
The White Horse	II	The Green			23 May 1967	TQ7999855984; 51°16′28″N 0°34′45″E		1336250	The White Horse More images	Q26620762
Cross Keys Cottage Cross Keys Cottages	II	The Street			20 July 1984	TQ8046855727; 51°16′20″N 0°35′09″E		1086269	Upload Photo	Q26376469
Holly House	II	The Street			20 July 1984	TQ8022055863; 51°16′24″N 0°34′56″E		1336254	Upload Photo	Q26620766
The Old Bakery	II	The Street			20 July 1984	TQ8020655852; 51°16′24″N 0°34′56″E		1185400	Upload Photo	Q26480715
30-36, Ware Street	II	30-36, Ware Street			20 July 1984	TQ7966756131; 51°16′34″N 0°34′28″E		1086172	Upload Photo	Q26376056
62 and 64, Ware Street	II	62 and 64, Ware Street			20 July 1984	TQ7952556146; 51°16′34″N 0°34′21″E		1116270	Upload Photo	Q26409906
70, Ware Street	II	70, Ware Street, Thurnham			20 July 1984	TQ7946256157; 51°16′35″N 0°34′18″E		1336285	Upload Photo	Q26620791
Bearsted Railway Station	II	Ware Street			5 January 2011	TQ7988956119; 51°16′33″N 0°34′40″E		1396394	Bearsted Railway Station More images	Q2513832
Former Goods Shed at Bearsted Railway Station	II	Ware Street			5 January 2011	TQ7980856133; 51°16′33″N 0°34′35″E		1396392	Upload Photo	Q26675182
Hill House	II	Ware Street			26 April 1968	TQ7995756075; 51°16′31″N 0°34′43″E		1086171	Upload Photo	Q26376052
Little Snowfield	II	Ware Street			22 June 2010	TQ7992356040; 51°16′30″N 0°34′41″E		1393851	Upload Photo	Q26672989
Mount Pleasant	II	63, Ware Street			5 November 1990	TQ7949156114; 51°16′33″N 0°34′19″E		1086174	Upload Photo	Q26376067
Rose Cottages	II	26 and 28, Ware Street			20 July 1984	TQ7969156122; 51°16′33″N 0°34′29″E		1320036	Upload Photo	Q26606078
Weighbridge House at Bearsted Railway Station and Associated Structures	II	Ware Street			5 January 2011	TQ7984256117; 51°16′33″N 0°34′37″E		1396393	Upload Photo	Q26675183
Willington Court	II	Willington Street			2 August 1974	TQ7860255354; 51°16′10″N 0°33′32″E		1225728	Upload Photo	Q26519797
Garden House Approximately 15 Yards North of Snowfield	II	Yeoman Lane			20 July 1984	TQ7977755946; 51°16′27″N 0°34′34″E		1185453	Upload Photo	Q26480770
Snowfield	II	Yeoman Lane			20 July 1984	TQ7974755915; 51°16′27″N 0°34′32″E		1086270	Upload Photo	Q26376476
Spot Farm Cottage	II	Yeoman Way			20 July 1984	TQ7938454684; 51°15′47″N 0°34′11″E		1336216	Upload Photo	Q26620733

== See also ==
- Grade I listed buildings in Kent
- Grade II* listed buildings in Kent

== Sources ==
- Newman, John (2012) [1969], Kent: West and the Weald, The Buildings of England, New Haven and London: Yale University Press, ISBN 978-0-300-18509-6
