= Bredhurst =

Village in Kent, England

Coordinates: 51.330895°N 0.576010°E

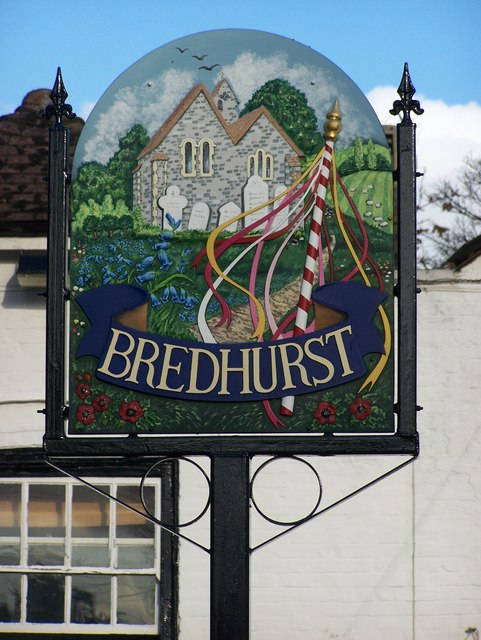

- Location within Kent
- Population: 397 (2011 Census)
- District: Maidstone
- Ceremonial county: Kent
- Region: South East
- Country: England
- Sovereign state: United Kingdom
- Post town: Gillingham
- Postcode district: ME7
- Dialling code: 01634
- Police: Kent
- Fire: Kent
- Ambulance: South East Coast
- UK Parliament: Faversham and Mid Kent

Bredhurst is a village and civil parish in Kent, that forms part of the Borough of Maidstone in England. Its population was 330 (1990), increasing to 397 at the 2011 Census. There has been a settlement on the site of the present day Bredhurst since Neolithic times because of fertile fields and the good wood supply. The village is quite close to the M2 motorway but retains a traditional feel.

Bredhurst is centred on The Bell Inn and Bredhurst Church of England primary school. The first dates from the Tudor period, the latter was founded in 1866. The school averages at 140 pupils with 20 pupils per year. Every year on or about the first Saturday of May, Bredhurst School holds its annual mayday celebration. This event is marked by maypole dancing, the crowning of the May Queen, the pageant of Saint George and the dragon, a procession, and many stalls. The procession starts at Abbots Court farm and ends at Bredhurst School, down the street. The traffic is stopped and the whole village is decked in bunting and banners.

Bredhurst manor dates from the time of King Edward III. It was bought by John of Gaunt in 1379 before King Richard II gave it to Simon de Burley in 1384. Burley lost the manor when he was accused of high treason in 1390.

By 1551, Sir Thomas Cheney was owner of the manor, followed by the Kemsley family later in the 16th century. Isabel Kemsley stipulated that her son John should hold 'a drinking' in the village on All Saints' Day and this tradition continued until the 19th century, when it was replaced with the more popular mayday celebrations.

The 19th century owners of the manor were the Romilly family, terminating when it was sold by the widow of the fourth Baron Romilly, William Guy Gospard Romilly (who died in 1983). It was later bought by a family who do not have a title, who sold most of the grounds off.

St Peter's church at Bredhurst is situated in woodland separate to the village. Typical of downland flint churches, it combines its 13th-century origins with 19th-century additions including a small bellcote with two bells. There is a small graveyard. Inside the church are a number of memorials to people who died in the first and second world wars. During the 16th century Reformation the treasures of the church were hidden by the incumbent and his parishioners and have never been found. The treasure included a golden chalice and the golden altar plate. The famous Bredhurst paten, which held the communion bread, was found and restored in 1907. It is made of copper and was originally gilded, and dates from 1180–1260. It is one of only four known and all the others were found in the graves of bishops or archbishops. The paten is said to be priceless and is kept at the Victoria & Albert Museum as part of their "sacred silver" collection.

Bredhurst was largely untouched during the Blitz and the whole Second World War, however in 1939 evacuation began; the evacuees went to Bredhurst School.

Today most of Bredhurst is still made up of farms and woodland; these include Abbots Court farm, Aaron Bank farm and Grange farm. It was reported that there are more livestock living in Bredhurst than people.

== Bredhurst School ==
Bredhurst School was built in 1867 during the later part of the Victorian era. In the log book of Bredhurst school the rural dean was reported to say "I am glad to find that a very good school has been built which is of great advantage to the Parish and of material benefit to the rising generation.” The school was typically Victorian with high windows in the schoolroom to avoid distractions to pupils, a central stove to provide heating and the Schoolmistress' accommodation adjoining. The earliest log book shows that Mrs S.Belcher was Headmistress and was supported by two assistant mistresses and the Vicar who lived in the Rectory, an imposing edifice which stood where Fir Tree Grove is now situated. The curriculum differed greatly from today's and included drill for the boys, knitting and needlework for the girls, recitations and object lessons on subjects as diverse “The Tongue of a Bee” and “Dairying and Cattle Feeding.” These object lessons were sometimes given by the Managers of the School or the Vicar and were illustrated by lantern slides. Bredhurst has always been a Church school and as such the regular three-hour Scripture lessons were very important. The Vicar attends very frequently to teach the children Bible stories, Catechisms and Psalms. Many of the issues faced by the Victorian school remain the same today; financial restraints, heating, maintenance, low level behavioural problems, visits from the School Nurse, dentist etc., etc. In those days, however, there were more holidays in which to recover the equilibrium. There were holidays to accommodate hop picking, fruit picking, harvesting, Ascension Day, Whitsun, Empire Day, Independence Day, school treats/picnics, Sunday school outings, choir outings, Bank holidays, all ‘Royal' events and even ‘whim' holidays granted at the Managers discretion. Today there are holidays for Christmas, summer and Easter as well as May Day and half term breaks.

Over the years the school has had a varied career, apart from being an educational establishment it has also served as a billet for soldiers during World War I, polling station, parish meeting place and evening school. A special meeting of the parish took place in June 1903 to appoint Mr H Chapman as Manager for the School for a period of three years. The school also housed a museum with various exhibits originating from the Victorian era which were used extensively during object lessons.

The police were in attendance regularly on Saturdays from 1913 in order to issue pig licences. Parishioners gathered in the schoolroom in 1919 in order to organise a 'Peace Celebration' for the village in the form of a cricket match, a fair and tea on 19 July 1919 on the village green.

There were very few changes or structural improvements made to the school until after World War II.

== See also ==
- Listed buildings in Bredhurst
