= Listed buildings in Coxheath =

Historic structures in Kent, England

Coxheath is a village and civil parish in the Borough of Maidstone of Kent, England It contains five grade II listed buildings that are recorded in the National Heritage List for England.

This list is based on the information retrieved online from Historic England.

== Key ==
Grade	Criteria
I	Buildings that are of exceptional interest
II*	Particularly important buildings of more than special interest
II	Buildings that are of special interest

== Listing ==
Name	Grade	Location	Type	Completed (Note: The date given is the date used by Historic England as significant for the initial building or that of an important part in the structure's description.)	Date designated	Grid ref. (Note: The grid reference is based on the British national grid reference system, sometimes known as OSGB36, used by the Ordnance Survey.) Geo-coordinates	Notes	Entry number (Note: The "List Entry Number" is a unique number assigned to each listed building and scheduled monument by Historic England.)	Image	Wikidata
Holy Trinity	II				6 September 1989	TQ7439051035; 51°13′55″N 0°29′47″E		1251225	Holy Trinity More images	Q26543208
Clock House	II	Heath Road			23 May 1967	TQ7460950714; 51°13′44″N 0°29′58″E		1060778	Upload Photo	Q26313943
Homestead	II	Heath Road			26 February 1987	TQ7426951137; 51°13′58″N 0°29′41″E		1263760	Upload Photo	Q26554530
Barn About 10 Metres North of Stockyard Cottage	II	Westerhill Road			26 February 1987	TQ7389350616; 51°13′42″N 0°29′21″E		1344352	Upload Photo	Q26628084
Westerhill	II	Westerhill Road			23 May 1967	TQ7408150655; 51°13′43″N 0°29′31″E		1263738	Upload Photo	Q26554508

== See also ==
- Grade I listed buildings in Kent
- Grade II* listed buildings in Kent

== Sources ==
- Newman, John (2012) [1969], Kent: West and the Weald, The Buildings of England, New Haven and London: Yale University Press, ISBN 978-0-300-18509-6
