= Listed buildings in Bicknor =

Civil Parish in Kent, England

Bicknor is a village and civil parish in the Borough of Maidstone of Kent, England It contains two grade II* and one grade II listed buildings that are recorded in the National Heritage List for England.

This list is based on the information retrieved online from Historic England.

== Key ==
Grade	Criteria
I	Buildings that are of exceptional interest
II*	Particularly important buildings of more than special interest
II	Buildings that are of special interest

== Listing ==
Name	Grade	Location	Type	Completed (Note: The date given is the date used by Historic England as significant for the initial building or that of an important part in the structure's description.)	Date designated	Grid ref. (Note: The grid reference is based on the British national grid reference system, sometimes known as OSGB36, used by the Ordnance Survey.) Geo-coordinates	Notes	Entry number (Note: The "List Entry Number" is a unique number assigned to each listed building and scheduled monument by Historic England.)	Image	Wikidata
Church of St James	II*				26 April 1968	TQ8605658821; 51°17′53″N 0°40′03″E		1185510	Church of St James More images	Q17545199
Court Lodge	II*	Bicknor Lane			26 April 1968	TQ8623858635; 51°17′47″N 0°40′12″E		1086227	Upload Photo	Q17545105
Placketts Hole	II	Bicknor Lane			26 April 1968	TQ8647859317; 51°18′09″N 0°40′25″E		1336275	Upload Photo	Q26620782

== See also ==
- Grade I listed buildings in Kent
- Grade II* listed buildings in Kent

== Sources ==
- Newman, John (2012) [1969], Kent: West and the Weald, The Buildings of England, New Haven and London: Yale University Press, ISBN 978-0-300-18509-6
