= Listed buildings in East Farleigh =

Historic structures in Kent, England

East Farleigh is a village and civil parish in the Borough of Maidstone of Kent, England It contains one grade I, one grade II* and 35 grade II listed buildings that are recorded in the National Heritage List for England.

This list is based on the information retrieved online from Historic England.

== Key ==
| Grade | Criteria |
|---|---|
| I | Buildings that are of exceptional interest |
| II* | Particularly important buildings of more than special interest |
| II | Buildings that are of special interest |

== Listing ==
| Name | Grade | Location | Type | Completed (Note: The date given is the date used by Historic England as significant for the initial building or that of an important part in the structure's description.) | Date designated | Grid ref. (Note: The grid reference is based on the British national grid reference system, sometimes known as OSGB36, used by the Ordnance Survey.) Geo-coordinates | Notes | Entry number (Note: The "List Entry Number" is a unique number assigned to each listed building and scheduled monument by Historic England.) | Image | Wikidata |
|---|---|---|---|---|---|---|---|---|---|---|
| Barkers Cottages Conifers Pleasant Sunset | II | 1, 2 and 3, Dean Street | | | 26 February 1987 | TQ7454653099; 51°15′01″N 0°29′59″E | | 1249477 | Upload Photo | Q26541608 |
| Barn to the South of Dean Farmhouse | II | Dean Street | | | 2 August 1974 | TQ7479953581; 51°15′17″N 0°30′13″E | | 1336184 | Upload Photo | Q26620701 |
| Dean Farmhouse | II | Dean Street | | | 2 August 1974 | TQ7480253598; 51°15′17″N 0°30′13″E | | 1086368 | Upload Photo | Q26376923 |
| Fern Oast | II | Dean Street, ME15 0HT | | | 2 August 1974 | TQ7467153344; 51°15′09″N 0°30′06″E | | 1239385 | Upload Photo | Q26532362 |
| Foley House | II | Dean Street | | | 26 February 1987 | TQ7448553125; 51°15′02″N 0°29′56″E | | 1060779 | Upload Photo | Q26313944 |
| Gate House Farmhouse and Number 1 Gate House | II | Dean Street | | | 23 May 1967 | TQ7454153072; 51°15′00″N 0°29′59″E | | 1263716 | Upload Photo | Q26554487 |
| Malt House Cottages | II | Dean Street | | | 26 February 1987 | TQ7435952779; 51°14′51″N 0°29′49″E | | 1249494 | Upload Photo | Q26541624 |
| North View Cottages | II | 1-4, Dean Street | | | 26 February 1987 | TQ7437453068; 51°15′00″N 0°29′50″E | | 1263691 | Upload Photo | Q26554464 |
| The Horse Shoes Public House | II | Dean Street | | | 23 May 1967 | TQ7387452060; 51°14′28″N 0°29′22″E | | 1060780 | The Horse Shoes Public House More images | Q26313945 |
| White Lion | II | Dean Street, ME15 0HT | | | 30 July 1951 | TQ7470853369; 51°15′10″N 0°30′08″E | | 1086369 | Upload Photo | Q26376929 |
| Gallants Manor and Mounting Block | II | Gallants Lane | | | 23 May 1967 | TQ7290352777; 51°14′53″N 0°28′34″E | | 1060781 | Upload Photo | Q26313946 |
| Adelaide Cottage | II | 1-6, Lower Road | | | 26 February 1987 | TQ7314453292; 51°15′09″N 0°28′47″E | | 1249637 | Upload Photo | Q26541750 |
| Church Hall | II | Lower Road | | | 20 December 1983 | TQ7339453285; 51°15′09″N 0°29′00″E | | 1249627 | Upload Photo | Q26541741 |
| Church of Saint Mary | II* | Lower Road | | | 23 May 1967 | TQ7341453317; 51°15′10″N 0°29′01″E | | 1249534 | Church of Saint Mary More images | Q17545249 |
| Cottage About 1.5 Metres North of Oaklands | II | Lower Road | | | 26 February 1987 | TQ7300653459; 51°15′15″N 0°28′40″E | | 1249665 | Upload Photo | Q26541775 |
| Drinking Trough to Centre of Junction with Station Road | II | Lower Road | | | 26 February 1987 | TQ7346353270; 51°15′08″N 0°29′03″E | | 1249531 | Upload Photo | Q26541660 |
| East Farleigh House | II | Lower Road | | | 23 May 1967 | TQ7304653324; 51°15′10″N 0°28′42″E | | 1249661 | Upload Photo | Q26541771 |
| Little Adelaide Farmhouse | II | Lower Road | | | 26 February 1987 | TQ7314053341; 51°15′11″N 0°28′47″E | | 1263634 | Upload Photo | Q26554413 |
| Monument About 1.5 Metres East of Chancel of Church of St Mary | II | Lower Road | | | 26 February 1987 | TQ7343353321; 51°15′10″N 0°29′02″E | | 1263666 | Upload Photo | Q26554442 |
| Monument About 3 Metres South East of South Porch of Church of St Mary | II | Lower Road | | | 26 February 1987 | TQ7341453301; 51°15′09″N 0°29′01″E | | 1263665 | Upload Photo | Q26554441 |
| Monument About 4 Metres East of Chancel of Church of St Mary | II | Lower Road | | | 26 February 1987 | TQ7343753323; 51°15′10″N 0°29′02″E | | 1263668 | Upload Photo | Q26554444 |
| Monument to Elizabeth Kennard Adjoining East End of South Chapel of Church of St Mary | II | Lower Road | | | 26 February 1987 | TQ7342553307; 51°15′09″N 0°29′01″E | | 1249587 | Upload Photo | Q26541707 |
| Monument to Mary Mercer About 4 Metres East of Chancel to Church of St Mary | II | Lower Road | | | 26 February 1987 | TQ7343753318; 51°15′10″N 0°29′02″E | | 1249621 | Upload Photo | Q26541736 |
| Monument to Peter Cooke About 6 Metres East of South Chapel of Church of St Mary | II | Lower Road | | | 26 February 1987 | TQ7343753309; 51°15′09″N 0°29′02″E | | 1263683 | Upload Photo | Q26554457 |
| Monument to Sarah Brewer About 21 Metres East of South Chapel of Church of St Mary | II | Lower Road | | | 26 February 1987 | TQ7344753304; 51°15′09″N 0°29′03″E | | 1249560 | Upload Photo | Q26541685 |
| Monument to Thomas Comber About 2 Metres East of Chancel of Church of St Mary | II | Lower Road | | | 26 February 1987 | TQ7343453316; 51°15′09″N 0°29′02″E | | 1249574 | Upload Photo | Q26541696 |
| Monument to Tolhurst About 2 Metres South of Church of St Mary | II | Lower Road | | | 26 February 1987 | TQ7340553304; 51°15′09″N 0°29′00″E | | 1263664 | Upload Photo | Q26554440 |
| Mounting Block to Centre of Junction with Station Road | II | Lower Road | | | 26 February 1987 | TQ7346053269; 51°15′08″N 0°29′03″E | | 1263699 | Upload Photo | Q26554472 |
| Oaklands | II | Lower Road | | | 26 February 1987 | TQ7299953450; 51°15′14″N 0°28′40″E | | 1249664 | Upload Photo | Q26541774 |
| School House | II | Lower Road | | | 20 December 1983 | TQ7338253283; 51°15′08″N 0°28′59″E | | 1263669 | Upload Photo | Q26554445 |
| St Helens | II | Lower Road | | | 6 March 1974 | TQ7248853442; 51°15′15″N 0°28′13″E | | 1249669 | Upload Photo | Q26541779 |
| Thatchers | II | Lower Road | | | 26 February 1987 | TQ7297753374; 51°15′12″N 0°28′38″E | | 1249662 | Upload Photo | Q26541772 |
| The Limes | II | Lower Road | | | 26 February 1987 | TQ7291753345; 51°15′11″N 0°28′35″E | | 1249667 | Upload Photo | Q26541777 |
| The Old Vicarage | II | Lower Road | | | 5 December 1985 | TQ7308253315; 51°15′10″N 0°28′44″E | | 1263636 | Upload Photo | Q26554414 |
| Bridge House | II | Station Road | | | 25 July 1952 | TQ7349553481; 51°15′15″N 0°29′05″E | | 1249677 | Upload Photo | Q26541786 |
| Highlands Farmhouse | II | Wilsons Lane | | | 26 February 1987 | TQ7312451994; 51°14′27″N 0°28′44″E | | 1249687 | Upload Photo | Q26541796 |

== See also ==
- Grade I listed buildings in Kent
- Grade II* listed buildings in Kent

== Sources ==
- Newman, John (2012) [1969], Kent: West and the Weald, The Buildings of England, New Haven and London: Yale University Press, ISBN 978-0-300-18509-6
