= Listed buildings in Bredhurst =

Civil Parish in Kent, England

Bredhurst is a village and civil parish in the Borough of Maidstone of Kent, England It contains ten grade II listed buildings that are recorded in the National Heritage List for England.

This list is based on the information retrieved online from Historic England.

== Key ==
Grade	Criteria
I	Buildings that are of exceptional interest
II*	Particularly important buildings of more than special interest
II	Buildings that are of special interest

== Listing ==
Name	Grade	Location	Type	Completed (Note: The date given is the date used by Historic England as significant for the initial building or that of an important part in the structure's description.)	Date designated	Grid ref. (Note: The grid reference is based on the British national grid reference system, sometimes known as OSGB36, used by the Ordnance Survey.) Geo-coordinates	Notes	Entry number (Note: The "List Entry Number" is a unique number assigned to each listed building and scheduled monument by Historic England.)	Image	Wikidata
Church of St Peter	II	Hurstwood Road			26 April 1968	TQ7990362126; 51°19′47″N 0°34′51″E		1185866	Church of St Peter More images	Q26481158
Table Tomb 1/2 Yard East of Tomb 2 Yards South East of South Aisle of Church of St Peter	II	Hurstwood Road			20 July 1984	TQ7992062115; 51°19′47″N 0°34′52″E		1186003	Upload Photo	Q26481277
Table Tomb 1/2 Yard South of Tomb 2 Yards South East of South Aisle of Church of St Peter	II	Hurstwood Road			20 July 1984	TQ7991562110; 51°19′47″N 0°34′52″E		1086217	Upload Photo	Q26376246
Table Tomb 2 Yards South East of South Aisle of Chancel of Church of St Peter	II	Hurstwood Road			20 July 1984	TQ7991462115; 51°19′47″N 0°34′52″E		1336267	Upload Photo	Q26620775
Kemsley Street Farmhouse	II	Kemsley Street			20 July 1984	TQ8034262444; 51°19′57″N 0°35′15″E		1336268	Upload Photo	Q26620776
Abbotts Court	II	The Street			20 July 1984	TQ7981362562; 51°20′01″N 0°34′47″E		1186019	Upload Photo	Q26481292
Green Court	II	The Street			20 July 1984	TQ7955962303; 51°19′53″N 0°34′34″E		1186007	Upload Photo	Q26481281
Hollyhock Cottage	II	The Street			20 July 1984	TQ7965662328; 51°19′54″N 0°34′39″E		1186014	Upload Photo	Q26481287
Horseshoes	II	The Street			20 July 1984	TQ7966462334; 51°19′54″N 0°34′39″E		1086219	Upload Photo	Q26376257
The Bell	II	The Street			20 July 1984	TQ7961462289; 51°19′53″N 0°34′37″E		1086218	Upload Photo	Q26376251

== See also ==
- Grade I listed buildings in Kent
- Grade II* listed buildings in Kent

== Sources ==
- Newman, John (2012) [1969], Kent: West and the Weald, The Buildings of England, New Haven and London: Yale University Press, ISBN 978-0-300-18509-6
