= Listed buildings in Yalding =

Civil Parish in Kent, England

Yalding is a village and civil parish in the Borough of Maidstone of Kent, England It contains one grade I, eight grade II* and 105 grade II listed buildings that are recorded in the National Heritage List for England.

This list is based on the information retrieved online from Historic England.

== Key ==
Grade	Criteria
I	Buildings that are of exceptional interest
II*	Particularly important buildings of more than special interest
II	Buildings that are of special interest

== Listing ==
Name	Grade	Location	Type	Completed (Note: The date given is the date used by Historic England as significant for the initial building or that of an important part in the structure's description.)	Date designated	Grid ref. (Note: The grid reference is based on the British national grid reference system, sometimes known as OSGB36, used by the Ordnance Survey.) Geo-coordinates	Notes	Entry number (Note: The "List Entry Number" is a unique number assigned to each listed building and scheduled monument by Historic England.)	Image	Wikidata
Yalding Memorial Cross	II	ME18 6JA			4 August 2015	TQ6992050258; 51°13′34″N 0°25′56″E		1427690	Yalding Memorial Cross More images	Q26677378
Benover House	II*	Benover Road			23 May 1967	TQ7046048245; 51°12′29″N 0°26′20″E		1060629	Upload Photo	Q17544968
Bridge Cottage Kingsland Cottages	II	Benover Road			22 December 1978	TQ6972949935; 51°13′24″N 0°25′45″E		1060619	Upload Photo	Q26313767
Burnt Oak	II*	Benover Road			23 May 1967	TQ7011348684; 51°12′43″N 0°26′03″E		1344428	Upload Photo	Q26268216
Cobblestones Restaurant	II	Benover Road			22 December 1978	TQ6969849924; 51°13′24″N 0°25′44″E		1060625	Upload Photo	Q26313776
Congelow Cottages	II	1, 2 and 3, Benover Road, Congelow			14 October 1987	TQ6985349361; 51°13′05″N 0°25′51″E		1320310	Upload Photo	Q26606322
Forge Cottage	II	Benover Road			14 October 1987	TQ6982349326; 51°13′04″N 0°25′49″E		1344427	Upload Photo	Q26628152
Gabriels Cottages	II	Benover Road			14 October 1987	TQ6972649902; 51°13′23″N 0°25′45″E		1115434	Upload Photo	Q26409165
Killicks Cottages	II	1-8, Benover Road			14 October 1987	TQ6975649823; 51°13′21″N 0°25′46″E		1115448	Upload Photo	Q26409178
Ladybird Cottages	II	Benover Road			14 October 1987	TQ6977649793; 51°13′20″N 0°25′47″E		1115417	Upload Photo	Q26409151
Little Benover	II	Benover Road			23 May 1967	TQ7012948631; 51°12′42″N 0°26′04″E		1060628	Upload Photo	Q26313778
Little Benover Cottage Well Cottage	II	Benover Road			14 October 1987	TQ7018148557; 51°12′39″N 0°26′06″E		1115410	Upload Photo	Q26409145
New Barns	II	Benover Road			23 May 1967	TQ7018948711; 51°12′44″N 0°26′07″E		1320301	Upload Photo	Q26606315
Nightingale Farmhouse	II*	Benover Road			14 October 1987	TQ6983149231; 51°13′01″N 0°25′49″E		1060627	Upload Photo	Q17544963
Quinnels	II	Benover Road			14 October 1987	TQ7001449012; 51°12′54″N 0°25′58″E		1060620	Upload Photo	Q26313768
Styles	II	Benover Road			14 October 1987	TQ6977149804; 51°13′20″N 0°25′47″E		1060626	Upload Photo	Q26313777
Thatchers	II	Benover Road			14 October 1987	TQ7024948531; 51°12′38″N 0°26′10″E		1060621	Upload Photo	Q26313770
The Chestnut Tree	II	Benover Road			14 October 1987	TQ6982249309; 51°13′04″N 0°25′49″E		1320426	Upload Photo	Q26606418
The Normans	II*	Benover Road, Benover			13 May 1967	TQ7004348738; 51°12′45″N 0°25′59″E		1115396	The Normans More images	Q17545175
The Woolpack Inn	II	Benover Road, Benover			14 October 1987	TQ7047848310; 51°12′31″N 0°26′21″E		1320378	The Woolpack Inn More images	Q26606380
Wooletts Cottages	II	1, 2 and 3, Benover Road			23 May 1967	TQ6973349891; 51°13′23″N 0°25′45″E		1344426	Upload Photo	Q26628151
Bow Hill House	II	Bow Hill			23 May 1967	TQ6943551907; 51°14′28″N 0°25′33″E		1060630	Upload Photo	Q26313780
Stables About 5 Metres West of Bow Hill House	II	Bow Hill			14 October 1987	TQ6947051914; 51°14′28″N 0°25′35″E		1115123	Upload Photo	Q26408873
Cleaves Hall, Cleaves House and Footpath Between Cleaves Hall and Vicarage Road	II	Cleaves House And Footpath Between Cleaves Hall And Vicarage Road, The Green			14 October 1987	TQ6994450290; 51°13′35″N 0°25′57″E		1348520	Upload Photo	Q26631896
Great Fowlhall	II	Darman Lane, Fowle Hall			14 October 1987	TQ6872846407; 51°11′31″N 0°24′48″E		1344034	Upload Photo	Q26627788
Barn Adjoining Mileham Farm House to South East	II	Gravelly Ways			14 October 1987	TQ6830247947; 51°12′21″N 0°24′28″E		1344035	Upload Photo	Q26627789
Woodfalls	II	Gravelly Ways, Laddingford			14 October 1987	TQ6899348827; 51°12′49″N 0°25′05″E		1069053	Upload Photo	Q26321743
Station House	II	Hampstead Lane			14 October 1987	TQ6846350167; 51°13′33″N 0°24′40″E		1145917	Upload Photo	Q26439069
The Anchor Inn and House Adjoining to Rear	II	Hampstead Lane			14 October 1987	TQ6899849808; 51°13′21″N 0°25′07″E		1069056	The Anchor Inn and House Adjoining to Rear More images	Q26321746
Barn About 10 Metres South of South Transept of Church of St Peter and St Paul	II	High Street			14 October 1987	TQ6987950034; 51°13′27″N 0°25′53″E		1344040	Upload Photo	Q26627793
Bridge House	II	High Street			23 May 1967	TQ6976750044; 51°13′28″N 0°25′47″E		1069033	Upload Photo	Q26321723
Church Cottage Church Cottages the Hollies	II	High Street			23 May 1967	TQ6987850136; 51°13′30″N 0°25′53″E		1145918	Upload Photo	Q26439071
Church House	II*	High Street			23 May 1967	TQ6986050113; 51°13′30″N 0°25′52″E		1344038	Church House More images	Q17545375
Church of St Peter and St Paul	I	High Street			23 May 1967	TQ6984650069; 51°13′28″N 0°25′51″E		1145919	Church of St Peter and St Paul More images	Q7595342
Court Lodge and the Dairy House	II*	High Street			25 July 1952	TQ6985550207; 51°13′33″N 0°25′52″E		1069066	Court Lodge and the Dairy House More images	Q17545093
Former Barn and Byres About 40 Metres West of Court Lodge	II	High Street			30 April 1986	TQ6981150216; 51°13′33″N 0°25′50″E		1344060	Upload Photo	Q26627810
Former the Bull Inn Public House	II	High Street, ME18 6HX			14 October 1987	TQ6980850113; 51°13′30″N 0°25′50″E		1344062	Former the Bull Inn Public House More images	Q26627812
Interphil House	II	High Street			23 May 1967	TQ6981550092; 51°13′29″N 0°25′50″E		1069065	Upload Photo	Q26321748
Leesden House	II	High Street			23 May 1967	TQ6990350187; 51°13′32″N 0°25′55″E		1318885	Upload Photo	Q26604998
Monument About 11 Metres East of Chancel of Church of St Peter and St Paul	II	High Street			14 October 1987	TQ6988350064; 51°13′28″N 0°25′53″E		1145921	Upload Photo	Q94532327
Monument About 2 Metres North of North Aisle of Church of St Peter and St Paul	II	High Street			14 October 1987	TQ6984050081; 51°13′29″N 0°25′51″E		1069063	Upload Photo	Q94532322
Monument About 30 Metres North of North Aisle of Church of St Peter and St Paul	II	High Street			14 October 1987	TQ6984350099; 51°13′29″N 0°25′51″E		1069064	Upload Photo	Q94532323
Monument About 6 1/2 Metres North East of Chancel of Church of St Peter and St Paul	II	High Street			14 October 1987	TQ6987650072; 51°13′28″N 0°25′53″E		1069062	Upload Photo	Q94532321
Monument About 6 Metres North of North Aisle of Church of St Peter and St Paul	II	High Street			14 October 1987	TQ6984150087; 51°13′29″N 0°25′51″E		1145922	Upload Photo	Q94532328
Monument About 9 Metres North of Chancel of Church of St Peter and St Paul	II	High Street			14 October 1987	TQ6986650077; 51°13′29″N 0°25′53″E		1318888	Upload Photo	Q94532332
Monument to James Jeffe(rey?) About 10 Metres South of South Transept of Church of St Peter and St Paul	II	High Street			14 October 1987	TQ6985650048; 51°13′28″N 0°25′52″E		1145920	Upload Photo	Q94532325
Monument to Joan(?) Cox About 4 Metres West of Gable End of Church of St Peter and St Paul	II	High Street			14 October 1987	TQ6981950079; 51°13′29″N 0°25′50″E		1069058	Upload Photo	Q94532314
Monument to Martha Whitehead About 18 Metres East of Chancel of Church of St Peter and St Paul	II	High Street			14 October 1987	TQ6989450071; 51°13′28″N 0°25′54″E		1318887	Upload Photo	Q94532330
Monument to Thomas Jefferey About 32 Metres North of Chancel of Church of St Peter and St Paul	II	High Street			14 October 1987	TQ6986550098; 51°13′29″N 0°25′53″E		1069060	Upload Photo	Q94532318
Monument to Thomas and Martin Jefferey About 30 Metres North of Chancel of Church of St Peter and St Paul	II	High Street			14 October 1987	TQ6986850095; 51°13′29″N 0°25′53″E		1069059	Upload Photo	Q94532316
Monument to William Winton About 3 1/2 Metres West of Tower of Church of St Peter and St Paul	II	High Street			14 October 1987	TQ6982150069; 51°13′28″N 0°25′50″E		1069061	Upload Photo	Q94532319
Oak Cottage	II	High Street			23 May 1967	TQ6981650115; 51°13′30″N 0°25′50″E		1069031	Upload Photo	Q26321721
Outbuilding About 30 Metres North West of the Coach House	II	High Street			14 October 1987	TQ6984150108; 51°13′30″N 0°25′51″E		1145923	Upload Photo	Q26439072
Prawle Cottage	II	4 and 5, High Street			14 October 1987	TQ6990950207; 51°13′33″N 0°25′55″E		1344037	Upload Photo	Q26627791
Randall Cottages	II	1, 2 and 3, High Street			23 May 1967	TQ6990050157; 51°13′31″N 0°25′54″E		1069057	Upload Photo	Q26321747
Stone in Angle Between Front Elevation and Front Steps of the Forge	II	High Street			14 October 1987	TQ6984350131; 51°13′30″N 0°25′51″E		1069030	Upload Photo	Q26321720
Swan Flats Swan Place the Stores (beauchamps)	II	High Street			23 May 1967	TQ6978150076; 51°13′29″N 0°25′48″E		1344064	Upload Photo	Q26627814
The Coach House	II	High Street			23 May 1967	TQ6982250097; 51°13′29″N 0°25′50″E		1344039	Upload Photo	Q26627792
The Forge	II	High Street			23 May 1967	TQ6983950134; 51°13′30″N 0°25′51″E		1344061	Upload Photo	Q26627811
The Hop Barn and the Old Barn	II	High Street			23 May 1967	TQ6985750161; 51°13′31″N 0°25′52″E		1069029	Upload Photo	Q26321719
The Tatt	II	1 and 2, High Street			23 May 1967	TQ6978750109; 51°13′30″N 0°25′49″E		1069032	Upload Photo	Q26321722
The Tatt	II	High Street			14 October 1987	TQ6977150108; 51°13′30″N 0°25′48″E		1344063	Upload Photo	Q26685313
Walnut Tree Cottages	II	1, 2 and 3, High Street			14 October 1987	TQ6989750269; 51°13′35″N 0°25′54″E		1366271	Upload Photo	Q26647876
Willow Grove	II	High Street			23 May 1967	TQ6956249906; 51°13′23″N 0°25′37″E		1099926	Upload Photo	Q26392035
Yalding Library	II	High Street, ME18 6HU			23 May 1967	TQ6980950085; 51°13′29″N 0°25′50″E		1366269	Upload Photo	Q26647875
Kenward	II	Kenward Road			25 July 1952	TQ6911151435; 51°14′13″N 0°25′16″E		1344065	Upload Photo	Q26627815
Kenward Farmhouse	II	Kenward Road			14 October 1987	TQ6926351007; 51°13′59″N 0°25′23″E		1099152	Upload Photo	Q26391304
Chapel House and Prince of Wales Cottage	II	Laddingford			14 October 1987	TQ6908548267; 51°12′31″N 0°25′09″E		1099130	Upload Photo	Q26391285
Former Laddingford Farm Cottages	II	Laddingford, ME18 6BX			14 October 1987	TQ6912248446; 51°12′37″N 0°25′11″E		1069035	Upload Photo	Q26321725
Frenches Farmhouse	II	Laddingford			14 October 1987	TQ6909248296; 51°12′32″N 0°25′10″E		1069037	Upload Photo	Q26321727
Laddingford House	II	Laddingford			23 May 1967	TQ6916048832; 51°12′49″N 0°25′14″E		1069034	Upload Photo	Q26321724
Manor Farmhouse	II	Laddingford			23 May 1967	TQ6938848535; 51°12′39″N 0°25′25″E		1099121	Upload Photo	Q26391275
Mereworth House	II	Laddingford			14 October 1987	TQ6911848358; 51°12′34″N 0°25′11″E		1069036	Upload Photo	Q26321726
Mileham Farmhouse	II	Laddingford, ME18 6BZ			14 October 1987	TQ6829547963; 51°12′22″N 0°24′28″E		1139010	Upload Photo	Q26431971
Oast Cottage and Attached Oasthouses and Outbuildings	II	Laddingford			23 May 1978	TQ6910948382; 51°12′35″N 0°25′11″E		1099124	Upload Photo	Q26391278
Railings Approximately 10 Metres West of Laddingford House	II	Laddingford			14 October 1987	TQ6913248829; 51°12′49″N 0°25′13″E		1099115	Upload Photo	Q26391269
The Chequers Inn	II	Laddingford			14 October 1987	TQ6897548154; 51°12′27″N 0°25′03″E		1349076	The Chequers Inn More images	Q26632398
The Nook and Landways	II	Laddingford			14 October 1987	TQ6907448268; 51°12′31″N 0°25′09″E		1069038	Upload Photo	Q26321728
The Olde Thatch	II	Laddingford			14 October 1987	TQ6919948718; 51°12′45″N 0°25′16″E		1344066	Upload Photo	Q26627816
Lees Cottage	II	Lees Road			14 October 1987	TQ6954749926; 51°13′24″N 0°25′36″E		1069041	Upload Photo	Q26321731
Lees House	II	Lees Road			23 May 1967	TQ6934449712; 51°13′17″N 0°25′25″E		1344067	Upload Photo	Q26627817
The Limes the Lodge	II	Lees Road			23 May 1967	TQ6962049968; 51°13′25″N 0°25′40″E		1069040	Upload Photo	Q26321730
Weeks of Goudhurst, Yalding Post Office and Attached Ranges to North and West Weeks of Goudhurst, Yalding Post Office and Ranges to West	II	Lees Road			14 October 1987	TQ6970149955; 51°13′25″N 0°25′44″E		1349100	Upload Photo	Q26632419
Uptons	II	Lees Road, Laddingford			23 May 1967	TQ6912149009; 51°12′55″N 0°25′12″E		1069039	Upload Photo	Q26321729
Vine House	II	Lees Road			14 October 1987	TQ6960949931; 51°13′24″N 0°25′39″E		1069042	Upload Photo	Q26321732
Wisteria Cottage	II	Lees Road, ME18 6HB			14 October 1987	TQ6956449950; 51°13′25″N 0°25′37″E		1348707	Upload Photo	Q26632068
Hillside Cottages	II	1-4, Lughorse Lane			14 October 1987	TQ7002150526; 51°13′43″N 0°26′01″E		1099895	Upload Photo	Q26392003
Bell Cottages	II	1 and 2, Maidstone Road, Beltring			10 August 1983	TQ6743247218; 51°11′59″N 0°23′42″E		1348691	Upload Photo	Q26632054
Beltring House	II	Maidstone Road, Beltring			23 May 1967	TQ6744146841; 51°11′47″N 0°23′42″E		1344068	Upload Photo	Q26627818
Oasthouse About 9 Metres North of Beltring House	II	Maidstone Road, Beltring			14 October 1987	TQ6744346865; 51°11′47″N 0°23′42″E		1069044	Upload Photo	Q26321734
Parsonage Farmhouse	II	Parsonage Lane			23 May 1967	TQ6878049743; 51°13′19″N 0°24′56″E		1069045	Upload Photo	Q26321735
Barn About 20 Metres North of Nos 3 and 4 West Pikefish Cottages	II	Pikefish Lane			14 October 1987	TQ6942647400; 51°12′02″N 0°25′25″E		1069046	Upload Photo	Q26321736
Barn About 35 Metres North North West of Nos 3 and 4 West Pikefish Cottages	II	Pikefish Lane			14 October 1987	TQ6945047409; 51°12′03″N 0°25′27″E		1344069	Upload Photo	Q26627819
Pikefish Cottages West Pike Fish Farm House	II	3 and 4, Pikefish Lane			23 May 1967	TQ6942647361; 51°12′01″N 0°25′25″E		1100338	Upload Photo	Q26392467
Railings Approximately 5 Metres West of the Old House	II	Queen Street, Fowle Hall			14 October 1987	TQ6908546244; 51°11′25″N 0°25′06″E		1344052	Upload Photo	Q26627803
The Old House	II	Queen Street, Fowle Hall			23 May 1967	TQ6909646249; 51°11′26″N 0°25′06″E		1348478	Upload Photo	Q26631855
The Old House Barn About 35 Metres East of the Old House	II	Queen Street, Fowle Hall			14 October 1987	TQ6914446249; 51°11′26″N 0°25′09″E		1069010	Upload Photo	Q26321699
Fox Pitt	II	Shingle Barn Lane			14 October 1987	TQ7141851639; 51°14′17″N 0°27′15″E		1344053	Upload Photo	Q26627804
The Cottage	II	Smiths Hill			14 October 1987	TQ7113252042; 51°14′31″N 0°27′01″E		1069011	Upload Photo	Q26321700
Former Cart Shed Or Store About 60 Metres South South West of Mill Place Farm House	II	Symmonds Lane			14 October 1987	TQ6955148834; 51°12′49″N 0°25′34″E		1344055	Upload Photo	Q26627806
Mill Place Farm House	II	Symmonds Lane			23 May 1967	TQ6957648898; 51°12′51″N 0°25′36″E		1069013	Upload Photo	Q26321702
K6 Telephone Kiosk	II	The Lees			23 February 1989	TQ6970549949; 51°13′25″N 0°25′44″E		1253803	Upload Photo	Q26545525
Barn About 33 Metres North West of Rose Cottages	II	Vicarage Road			14 October 1987	TQ6995650267; 51°13′35″N 0°25′57″E		1069015	Upload Photo	Q26321704
Cherry Tree House	II	Vicarage Road, ME18 6DS			14 October 1987	TQ7045050060; 51°13′27″N 0°26′23″E		1069016	Upload Photo	Q26321705
Rose Cottages	II*	1 and 2, Vicarage Road			23 May 1967	TQ6997550252; 51°13′34″N 0°25′58″E		1348526	Rose Cottages More images	Q17545425
Stables About 18 Metres North North East of Wardes Moat	II	Vicarage Road			14 October 1987	TQ7048149906; 51°13′22″N 0°26′24″E		1069017	Upload Photo	Q26321706
The Village Lockup	II	Vicarage Road			23 May 1967	TQ6994250259; 51°13′34″N 0°25′57″E		1069014	Upload Photo	Q26321703
Wardes Moat	II	Vicarage Road			25 July 1952	TQ7045649880; 51°13′22″N 0°26′23″E		1100272	Upload Photo	Q26392360
Former Barn About 4 Metres East of Willow Grove	II	1 and 2, Willow Grove Barn, Lees Road, ME18 6HB			14 October 1987	TQ6957049919; 51°13′24″N 0°25′37″E		1069043	Upload Photo	Q26321733
The Old Farm House	II	Willow Lane, Queen Street			14 October 1987	TQ6918045670; 51°11′07″N 0°25′10″E		1348544	Upload Photo	Q26631917
Downs Farm House	II*	Yalding Hill			23 May 1967	TQ6991250359; 51°13′38″N 0°25′55″E		1348345	Upload Photo	Q17545420
Jasmine Cottage	II	Yalding Hill			14 October 1987	TQ6997550426; 51°13′40″N 0°25′59″E		1069018	Upload Photo	Q26321707
The Mount	II	Yalding Hill			14 October 1987	TQ6996750458; 51°13′41″N 0°25′58″E		1348549	Upload Photo	Q26631922
The Walnut Tree Public House	II	Yalding Hill			14 October 1987	TQ6990750306; 51°13′36″N 0°25′55″E		1069019	The Walnut Tree Public House More images	Q26321708

== See also ==
- Grade I listed buildings in Kent
- Grade II* listed buildings in Kent

== Sources ==
- Newman, John (2012) [1969], Kent: West and the Weald, The Buildings of England, New Haven and London: Yale University Press, ISBN 978-0-300-18509-6
