= Bicknor =

Village in Kent, England

Coordinates: 51.295090°N 0.668440°E

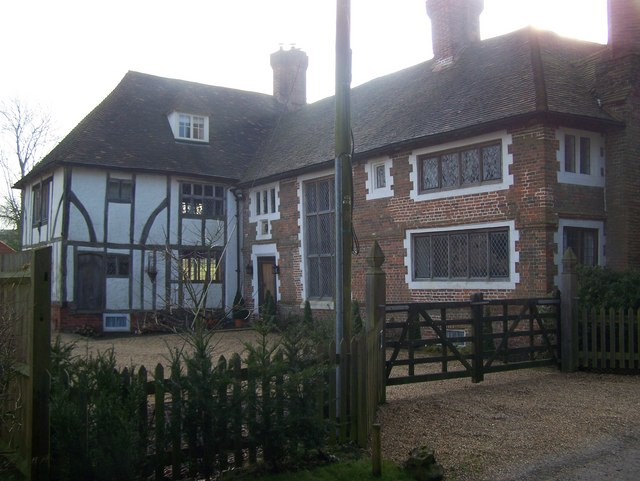
- Bicknor Court

- Location within Kent
- District: Maidstone
- Shire county: Kent
- Region: South East
- Country: England
- Sovereign state: United Kingdom
- Post town: Sittingbourne
- Postcode district: ME9
- Police: Kent
- Fire: Kent
- Ambulance: South East Coast
- UK Parliament: Faversham and Mid Kent

Bicknor is a village and civil parish in the Maidstone district of Kent, England, north-east of Maidstone and south-west of Sittingbourne. It had a population of 68 according to the 2001 census.

Historical population of Bicknor
Year	1801	1811	1821	1831	1841	1851	1881	1891	1901	1911	1921	1931	1951	1961
Population	52	49	53	44	46	40	37	53	52	48	37	35	71	57

== See also ==
- Listed buildings in Bicknor
