= Nettlestead, Kent =

Village in Kent, England

Coordinates: 51.244600°N 0.411210°E

Nettlestead
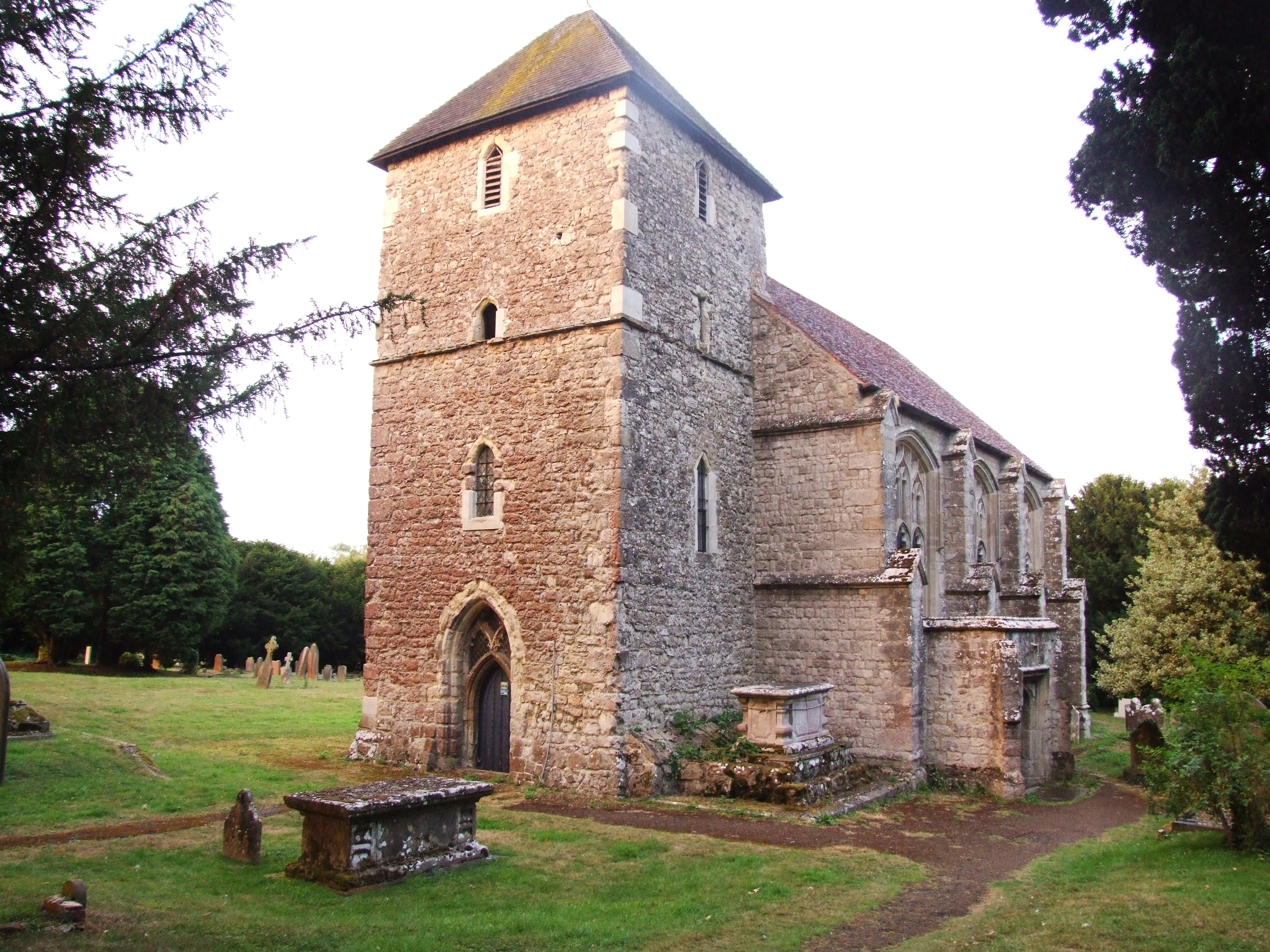
- St. Mary the Virgin, Nettlestead

- Location within Kent
- Population: 870 (2011 Census)
- OS grid reference: TQ6852
- District: Maidstone
- Shire county: Kent
- Region: South East
- Country: England
- Sovereign state: United Kingdom
- Post town: Maidstone
- Postcode district: ME18
- Police: Kent
- Fire: Kent
- Ambulance: South East Coast
- UK Parliament: Weald of Kent

Nettlestead is a village and civil parish on the road southwest of, and part of the borough of Maidstone. The parish includes Nettlestead Green and is part of Seven Mile Lane. More than 800 people live in the parish. The parish church of St Mary the Virgin has links with William the Conqueror's half brother, Odo.

Reginald de Pympe, Member of Parliament for Kent in 1411 and 1422, moved into Nettlestead Place, which he rebuilt. He, and his son John, also added new stained glass windows to the parish church.

Nettlestead Green is a separate village lying two miles further south. Both villages are close to the River Medway. Wateringbury is immediately to the north.

== Notable residents ==
- Reynold Pympe, MP (c. 1371–1426)

== See also ==
- Listed buildings in Nettlestead, Kent
