= Maidstone Borough Council elections =

Local government elections in Kent, England

Elections to Maidstone Borough Council in Kent, United Kingdom are held each year to elect one-third of its members, followed by one year without election. Since the last boundary changes in 2002, 55 councillors have been elected from 26 wards. From 2024 onwards, the format of elections will change, with all 49 councillors being elected once every 4 years.

== Council composition ==
Composition of the council
Year	Conservative	Liberal Democrats (Note: Includes totals for the predecessors of the Liberal Democrats, the Liberal Party and SDP (both of which participated in the Alliance).)	Labour	Green	UKIP	Independents & Others	Council control after election
Local government reorganisation; council established (60 seats)
1973	13	19	12	–	–	16	No overall control
1976	39	7	7	0	–	7	Conservative
New ward boundaries (55 seats)
1979	34	7	10	0	–	0	Conservative
1980	32	9	10	0	–	4	Conservative
1982	28	15	9	0	–	3	Conservative
1983	27	17	8	0	–	3	No overall control
1984	24	20	8	0	–	3	No overall control
1986	20	23	9	0	–	3	No overall control
1987	20	25	8	0	–	2	No overall control
1988	22	23	8	0	–	2	No overall control
1990	20	23	8	0	–	4	No overall control
1991	20	22	9	0	–	4	No overall control
1992	27	16	8	0	–	4	No overall control
1994	23	17	10	0	0	5	No overall control
1995	17	17	15	0	0	6	No overall control
1996	11	21	18	0	0	5	No overall control
1998	13	21	16	0	0	5	No overall control
1999	15	22	13	0	0	5	No overall control
2000	16	22	12	0	0	5	No overall control
New ward boundaries (55 seats)
2002	19	21	12	0	0	3	No overall control
2003	21	21	10	0	0	3	No overall control
2004	23	20	9	0	0	3	No overall control
2006	27	20	5	0	0	3	No overall control
2007	26	21	4	0	0	4	No overall control
2008	29	20	1	0	0	5	Conservative
2010	28	23	0	0	0	4	Conservative
New ward boundaries (55 seats)
2011	30	21	0	0	0	4	Conservative
2012	30	19	1	0	0	5	Conservative
2014	25	19	2	0	4	5	No overall control
2015	25	20	2	0	4	4	No overall control
2016	23	22	2	0	5	3	No overall control
2018	27	19	3	0	1	0	No overall control
2019	25	20	4	0	1	5	No overall control
2021	29	17	4	0	0	5	Conservative
2022	27	12	5	1	0	10	No overall control
2023	24	12	6	3	0	10	No overall control
New ward boundaries (49 seats)
2024	13	12	6	10	0	8 (Note: Including 2 Fant & Oakwood Independents)	No overall control

== Borough result maps ==
2002 results map

2003 results map

2004 results map

2006 results map

2007 results map

2008 results map

2010 results map

2011 results map

2012 results map

2014 results map

2015 results map

2016 results map

2018 results map

2019 results map

2021 results map

2022 results map

2023 results map

2024 results map

== By-elections ==
=== 1994-1998 ===
Yalding Ward By-Election 1 May 1997
Candidate	Party	Votes	%	±%
	Conservative Party	1,000	44.44%	+12.1%
	Liberal Democrats	643	28.58%	-15.2%
	Labour Party	607	26.98%	+7.3%
Total		2,250	100.00%	
Rejected Ballot Papers				
Ballot Papers Issued				
Registered Electors				
Turnout				
	Conservative gain from Liberal Democrats			

Loose Ward By-Election 3 July 1997
Candidate	Party	Votes	%	±%
	Liberal Democrats	283	59.08%	-13.8%
	Conservative Party	117	24.43%	+8.2%
	Labour Party	79	16.49%	+5.5%
Total		479	100.00%	
Rejected Ballot Papers				
Ballot Papers Issued				
Registered Electors				
Turnout		25.4%		
	Liberal Democrats hold			

High Street Ward By-Election 13 November 1997
Candidate	Party	Votes	%	±%
	Liberal Democrats	350	39.64%	-3.0%
	Labour Party	310	35.11%	-5.8%
	Conservative Party	123	13.93%	+0.1%
	Maidstone First	73	8.27%	+8.3%
	Green Party	27	3.06%	+0.4%
Total		883	100.00%	
Rejected Ballot Papers				
Ballot Papers Issued				
Registered Electors				
Turnout		19.8%		
	Liberal Democrats gain from Labour			

=== 1998-2002 ===
Allington Ward By-Election 29 October 1998
Candidate	Party	Votes	%	±%
Cynthia Elizabeth Robertson	Liberal Democrats	744	72.16%	+5.2%
Margaret Helen June Taylor	Labour Party	159	15.42%	-0.3%
Helen Violet Mortimer	Conservative Party	128	12.42%	+2.8%
Total		1,031	100.00%	
Rejected Ballot Papers		0		
Ballot Papers Issued		1,031		
Registered Electors				
Turnout		18.5%		
Liberal Democrats hold				

Boxley Ward By-Election 29 October 1998
Candidate	Party	Votes	%	±%
Michael Ian Yates	Conservative Party	630	63.25%	+23.1%
John Brian Doherty	Liberal Democrats	201	20.18%	+6.1%
Stephen Gibson	Labour Party	165	16.57%	-25.5%
Total		996	100.00%	
Rejected Ballot Papers		2		
Ballot Papers Issued		998		
Registered Electors				
Turnout		14.1%		
Conservative gain from Independent				

Hollingbourne Ward By-Election 29 October 1998
Candidate	Party	Votes	%	±%
Tracy Ann Helen Warner	Conservative Party	198	48.29%	-12.0%
Paul Geoffrey Begg	Liberal Democrats	193	47.07%	+25.1%
Jeanne Mary Gibson	Labour Party	19	4.63%	-13.1%
Total		410	100.00%	
Rejected Ballot Papers		0		
Ballot Papers Issued		410		
Registered Electors				
Turnout		35.3%		
Conservative hold				

=== 2002-2006 ===
Marden & Yalding Ward By-Election 27 November 2003
Candidate	Party	Votes	%	±%
Paddy C. J. Germain	Conservative Party	726	49.83%	-12.5%
Carol A. Jacques	Liberal Democrats	535	36.72%	+18.4%
John M. Hughes	Labour Party	153	10.50%	-4.0%
Brian Hogg	UK Independence Party	43	2.95%	-1.8%
Total		1,457	100.00%	
Rejected Ballot Papers				
Ballot Papers Issued				
Registered Electors				
Turnout		24.4%		
Conservative hold				

Downswood & Otham Ward By-Election 13 October 2005
Candidate	Party	Votes	%	±%
David Marchant	Independent	314	61.33%	+15.0%
Timothy M. Crockford	Conservative Party	184	35.94%	+17.2%
Audrey D. Gardner	Labour Party	14	2.73%	+2.3%
Total		512	100.00%	
Rejected Ballot Papers				
Ballot Papers Issued				
Registered Electors				
Turnout		24.4%		
Independent hold				

=== 2006-2010 ===
Parkwood Ward By-Election 30 November 2006
Candidate	Party	Votes	%	±%
Robert Field	Liberal Democrats	347	57.64%	+23.5%
Wesley Mason	Labour Party	130	21.59%	-13.3%
Scott Hahnefeld	Conservative Party	125	20.76%	-10.1%
Total		602	100.00%	
Rejected Ballot Papers		2		
Ballot Papers Issued		604		
Registered Electors				
Turnout		19.3%		
Liberal Democrats gain from Labour				

Shepway South Ward By-Election 6 December 2007
Candidate	Party	Votes	%	±%
Sheena Williams	Conservative Party	251	35.96%	-9.7%
Gill Annan	Labour Party	240	34.38%	+34.4%
Bryan Charles Vizzard	Liberal Democrats	173	24.79%	-22.0%
Stephen Fraser Muggeridge	Green Party	34	4.87%	-2.6%
Total		698	100.00%	
Rejected Ballot Papers				
Ballot Papers Issued				
Registered Electors				
Turnout		16.1%		
Conservative gain from Labour				

Fant Ward By-Election 1 October 2009
Candidate	Party	Votes	%	±%
Fran Smith	Liberal Democrats	702	46.37%	+18.8%
Paul Butcher	Conservative Party	393	25.96%	-7.4%
Stuart Jeffery	Green Party	317	20.94%	+4.9%
Bruce Heald	Labour Party	102	6.74%	-16.3%
Total		1,514	100.00%	
Rejected Ballot Papers				
Ballot Papers Issued				
Registered Electors				
Turnout		23.6%		
Liberal Democrats hold				

=== 2010-2014 ===
A by-election was held in Allington Ward following the death of Malcolm Robertson on 10 August 2012.

Allington Ward By-Election 18 October 2012
Candidate	Party	Votes	%	±%
Belinda Janet Watson	Liberal Democrats	885	52.37%	
Barry Stephen Ginley	Conservative Party	434	25.68%	
Marianna Romeojuliet Poliszczuk	Labour Party	179	10.59%	
Gareth Anthony Kendall	UK Independence Party	162	9.59%	
Jill Shepherd	Green Party	30	1.78%	
Total		1,690	100.00%	
Rejected Ballot Papers		9		
Ballot Papers Issued		1,699		
Registered Electors		5,604		
Turnout		30.32%		
Liberal Democrats hold				

=== 2014-2018 ===
Staplehurst By-Election 27 July 2014
Party	Candidate	Votes	%	±%
Liberal Democrats	Paulina Watson	609	36.2	+9.1
Conservative	Louise Brice	603	35.9	+3.0
UKIP	Jamie Kalmar	311	18.5	−5.0
Labour	John Randall	117	7.0	−0.8
Green	David George	41	2.4	−1.1
Majority		6	0.4	
Turnout		1,681		
Liberal Democrats gain from Conservative		Swing		

Fant By-Election 10 September 2015
Party	Candidate	Votes	%	±%
Conservative	Matt Boughton	477	27.1	−2.6
Liberal Democrats	Rosaline Janko	424	24.1	+2.1
Labour	Keith Adkinson	352	20.0	−0.4
Green	Stuart Jeffery	249	14.2	+3.9
UKIP	Colin Taylor	180	10.2	−7.4
Independent	Mike Hogg	75	4.3	+4.3
Majority		53	3.0	
Turnout		1,757		
Conservative hold		Swing		

Shepway South By-Election 8 September 2016
Party	Candidate	Votes	%	±%
UKIP	John Barned	432	45.5	+7.2
Conservative	Bob Hinder	215	22.7	−5.1
Labour	Dan Wilkinson	183	19.3	−5.5
Independent	Jon Hicks	88	9.3	+9.3
Liberal Democrats	Milden Choongo	31	3.3	−2.6
Majority		217	22.9	
Turnout		949		
UKIP hold		Swing		

Bearsted By-Election 4 May 2017
Party	Candidate	Votes	%	±%
Conservative	Denis Spooner	1,713	72.7	+36.1
Labour	Tim Licence	253	10.7	+1.5
Liberal Democrats	Karen Davies	250	10.6	+7.4
Green	Ciaran Oliver	141	6.0	+2.7
Majority		1,460	61.9	
Turnout		2,357		
Conservative hold		Swing		

North Ward by-election, 30 November 2017
Party	Candidate	Votes	%	±%
Labour	Cleator, Maureen	270	19.3%	
Green	Eagle, Derek	47	3.4%	
Liberal Democrats	Field, Rob	719	51.4%	
Conservative	Taylor-Maggio, Cheryl Janette	270	25.9%	
Total votes		1399		
Liberal Democrats gain from Conservative		Swing		

=== 2018-2022 ===
Headcorn By-Election 13 September 2018
Party	Candidate	Votes	%	±%
Conservative	Karen Chappell-Tay	686	57.3	−17.5
Liberal Democrats	Merilyn Fraser	409	34.1	+19.6
Labour	Jim Grogan	63	5.3	−5.5
Green	Derek Eagle	40	3.3	+3.3
Majority		277	23.1	
Turnout		1,198		
Conservative hold		Swing		

=== 2022-2026 ===
Harrietsham, Lenham and North Downs By-Election 2 October 2025 (3 seats)
Party	Candidate	Votes	%	±%
Reform	Chris Houlihan	1,228		
Reform	Steve Povey	1,226		
Reform	Mariela Nedelcheva	1,153		
Green	Callum Sweetman	459		
Green	James Snyder	452		
Green	Reshmi Kalam	430		
Conservative	Isobelle Horne	342		
Conservative	Darcy Rotherham	285		
Liberal Democrats	Jennifer Horwood	236		
Conservative	Onyekachukwu Chukwuma	234		
Liberal Democrats	Sam Burrows	156		
Liberal Democrats	Andrew Cockersole	123		
Heritage	Sean Turner	97		
Independent	Gary Butler	74		
Independent	Sam Lawrence-Rose	69		
Reform gain from Independent		Swing		
Reform gain from Independent		Swing		
Reform gain from Independent		Swing		

== See also ==
- 2002 Maidstone Borough Council election (New ward boundaries)
- 2011 Maidstone Borough Council election (Some new ward boundaries)
- 2021 Maidstone Borough Council election (postponed from 2020 due to the COVID-19 pandemic)
- 2023 Maidstone Borough Council election (last elections held under old format)
- 2024 Maidstone Borough Council election (first election under 4-year cycle)
