= 2011 Maidstone Borough Council election =

2011 UK local government election

← 2010	5 May 2011	2012 →

20 members
- Turnout: 43%
	First party	Second party
Leader	Christopher Garland	Fran Wilson
Party	Conservative	Liberal Democrats
Leader's seat	n/a	High Street
Seats before	28	23
Seats won	12	6
Seats after	30	21
Seat change	▲2	▼2
- Results of the 2011 Maidstone District Council election
Leader before election
Christopher Garland
Conservative
Leader-elect
Christopher Garland
Conservative

Elections to Maidstone Borough Council were held on 5 May 2011. One-third of the borough council (20 members) were up for election. Parish council elections and the national Alternative Vote referendum were held on the same day.

== Overall results ==
The Conservatives stayed in overall control of the council by gaining two seats. The Liberal Democrats lost two seats.

Maidstone Borough Council
Party	Elected Seats	Total Seats	+/-
Conservative Party	12	30	+2
Liberal Democrats	6	21	-2
Independent	2	4	0
Total	20	55	
Valid Ballot Papers			
Rejected Ballot Papers	226		
Ballot Papers Issued			
Registered Electors	87,445		
Turnout	43%		

== Ward results ==
Allington Ward (1)
Candidate	Party	Votes	%
Cynthia Robertson	Liberal Democrats	1,345	48.45%
Barry Stephen Ginley	Conservative Party	1,048	37.75%
Wendy Florence Hollands	Labour Party	383	13.80%
Total		2,776	100.00%
Rejected Ballot Papers		9	
Ballot Papers Issued		2,785	
Registered Electors		5,518	
Turnout		50.47%	

Bearsted Ward (2)
Candidate	Party	Votes	% (Total)	% (Valid)
Val Springett	Conservative Party	1,754	30.17%	
Mike Cuming	Conservative Party	1,555	26.75%	
Pat Marshall	Independent	1,395	23.99%	
Jim Grogan	Labour Party	432	7.43%	
Gill Annan	Labour Party	281	4.83%	
Ciaran Dominic Oliver	Green Party	215	3.70%	
Sarah Ann Goodwin	Green Party	182	3.13%	
Total		5,814	100.00%	
Valid Ballot Papers				
Rejected Ballot Papers		36		
Ballot Papers Issued				
Registered Electors		6,616		
Turnout				

Boxley Ward (1)
Candidate	Party	Votes	%
Malcolm Frank Greer	Conservative Party	1,350	50.89%
Michael John Beckwith	Labour Party	862	32.49%
John Peter Watson	Liberal Democrats	264	9.95%
Penny Kemp	Green Party	177	6.67%
Total		2,653	100.00%
Rejected Ballot Papers		12	
Ballot Papers Issued		2,665	
Registered Electors		6,446	
Turnout		41.34%	

Coxheath & Hunton Ward (1)
Candidate	Party	Votes	%
Dennis Harold Collins	Conservative Party	1,247	46.51%
David Michael Stamp	Liberal Democrats	915	34.13%
Stella Marlyn Randall	Labour Party	265	9.88%
Keith Clement Woollven	UK Independence Party	140	5.22%
Robin James Kinrade	Green Party	114	4.25%
Total		2,681	100.00%
Rejected Ballot Papers		12	
Ballot Papers Issued		2,693	
Registered Electors		5,754	
Turnout		46.80%	

Detling & Thurnham Ward (1)
Candidate	Party	Votes	%
Nick de Wiggondene	Conservative Party	628	59.13%
Geoffrey Frank Licence	Independent	291	27.40%
Paul Michael Blackmore	Labour Party	143	13.47%
Total		1,062	100.00%
Rejected Ballot Papers		13	
Ballot Papers Issued		1,075	
Registered Electors		2,344	
Turnout		45.86%	

Downswood & Otham Ward (1)
Candidate	Party	Votes	%
Gordon William Newton	Independent	451	51.72%
Gary Cooke	Conservative Party	310	35.55%
Steve Gibson	Labour Party	84	9.63%
Andrew Crawford Waldie	Green Party	27	3.10%
Total		872	100.00%
Rejected Ballot Papers		4	
Ballot Papers Issued		876	
Registered Electors		2,107	
Turnout		41.58%	

East Ward (2)
Candidate	Party	Votes	% (Total)	% (Valid)
David Sandru Naghi	Liberal Democrats	1,286	24.43%	
Martin Ashley Richard Cox	Liberal Democrats	1,281	24.34%	
Tony Dennison	Conservative Party	1,010	19.19%	
Scott Hahnefeld	Conservative Party	858	16.30%	
Bruce Henry Heald	Labour Party	316	6.00%	
Caroline Burns	Green Party	270	5.13%	
Hannah Margaret Patton	Green Party	242	4.60%	
Total		5,263	100.00%	
Valid Ballot Papers				
Rejected Ballot Papers		19		
Ballot Papers Issued				
Registered Electors		6,500		
Turnout				

Fant Ward (1)
Candidate	Party	Votes	%
Alistair James Black	Conservative Party	727	29.60%
Fran Smith	Liberal Democrats	661	26.91%
Paul Harper	Labour Party	542	22.07%
Stuart Robert Jeffery	Green Party	526	21.42%
Total		2,456	100.00%
Rejected Ballot Papers		14	
Ballot Papers Issued		2,470	
Registered Electors		6,519	
Turnout		37.89%	

Harrietsham & Lenham Ward (1)
Candidate	Party	Votes	%
Tom Sams	Independent	1,175	55.32%
Marino (Maz) Michaelas	Conservative Party	827	38.94%
Jeanne Mary Gibson	Labour Party	122	5.74%
Total		2,124	100.00%
Rejected Ballot Papers		9	
Ballot Papers Issued		2,133	
Registered Electors		4,396	
Turnout		48.52%	

High Street Ward (1)
Candidate	Party	Votes	%
Fran Wilson	Liberal Democrats	853	41.45%
Valerie Katharine Parker	Conservative Party	533	25.90%
Marianna Romeojuliet Poliszczuk	Labour Party	333	16.18%
Wendy Kathleen Lewis	Green Party	176	8.55%
UK Independence Party	UK Independence Party	163	7.92%
Total		2,058	100.00%
Rejected Ballot Papers		11	
Ballot Papers Issued		2,069	
Registered Electors		6,367	
Turnout		32.50%	

Leeds Ward (1)
Candidate	Party	Votes	%
Peter James Dudley Parvin	Conservative Party	623	66.35%
Juliet Maria Maddocks	Independent	187	19.91%
Maggie Lack	Labour Party	129	13.74%
Total		939	100.00%
Rejected Ballot Papers		3	
Ballot Papers Issued		942	
Registered Electors		1,869	
Turnout		50.40%	

Loose Ward (1)
Candidate	Party	Votes	%
Susan Jane Grigg	Liberal Democrats	519	50.49%
Steve Sheppard	Conservative Party	413	40.18%
Joshua Amos	Labour Party	49	4.77%
Denise Joy Hay	Green Party	47	4.57%
Total		1,028	100.00%
Rejected Ballot Papers		5	
Ballot Papers Issued		1,033	
Registered Electors		1,960	
Turnout		52.70%	

Marden & Yalding Ward (1)
Candidate	Party	Votes	%
Annabelle Blackmore	Conservative Party	1,612	63.41%
Carol Ann Jacques	Liberal Democrats	425	16.72%
Edith Maud Davis	Labour Party	317	12.47%
James Edward Shalice	Green Party	188	7.40%
Total		2,542	100.00%
Rejected Ballot Papers		20	
Ballot Papers Issued		2,562	
Registered Electors		5,813	
Turnout		44.07%	

North Ward (1)
Candidate	Party	Votes	%
Mervyn Dyke Warner	Liberal Democrats	871	38.29%
Jeff Tree	Conservative Party	782	34.37%
Keith Adkinson	Labour Party	330	14.51%
Charles Richard Elliott	UK Independence Party	152	6.68%
Derek Roy Eagle	Green Party	140	6.15%
Total		2,275	100.00%
Rejected Ballot Papers		10	
Ballot Papers Issued		2,285	
Registered Electors		6,066	
Turnout		37.67%	

Shepway North Ward (1)
Candidate	Party	Votes	%
Marion Ann Ring	Conservative Party	1,139	52.25%
Geoff Harvey	Labour Party	589	27.02%
Geoffrey Richard Samme	Liberal Democrats	193	8.85%
Stephen Fraser Muggeridge	Green Party	157	7.20%
Gary Butler	British National Party	102	4.68%
Total		2,180	100.00%
Rejected Ballot Papers		8	
Ballot Papers Issued		2,188	
Registered Electors		6,504	
Turnout		33.64%	

South Ward (1)
Candidate	Party	Votes	%
Mike Hogg	Conservative Party	1,242	45.15%
John Wilson	Liberal Democrats	1,171	42.57%
Richard John Coates	Labour Party	338	12.29%
Total		2,751	100.00%
Rejected Ballot Papers		20	
Ballot Papers Issued		2,771	
Registered Electors		6,258	
Turnout		44.28%	

Staplehurst Ward (1)
Candidate	Party	Votes	%
Richard Lusty	Conservative Party	1,211	64.59%
John Edward Randall	Labour Party	288	15.36%
Ralph Frederick Austin	Liberal Democrats	228	12.16%
Ian Francis Stewart McDonald	Green Party	148	7.89%
Total		1,875	100.00%
Rejected Ballot Papers		15	
Ballot Papers Issued		1,890	
Registered Electors		4,349	
Turnout		43.46%	

Sutton Valence & Langley Ward (1)
Candidate	Party	Votes	%
Paulina Annette Veronica Stockell	Conservative Party	735	73.28%
Jean Harvey	Labour Party	156	15.55%
Susan Austin	Liberal Democrats	112	11.17%
Total		1,003	100.00%
Rejected Ballot Papers		6	
Ballot Papers Issued		1,009	
Registered Electors		2,059	
Turnout		49.00%	
