= 2014 Maidstone Borough Council election =

2014 UK local government election

← 2012	22 May 2014

20 members
- Turnout: 39%
	First party	Second party	Third party
Leader	Christopher Garland	Fran Wilson	Eddie Powell
Party	Conservative	Liberal Democrats	UKIP
Leader's seat	Shepway North	High Street	n/a
Seats before	29	20	0
Seats won	5	9	4
Seats after	25	19	4
Seat change	▼4	▼1	▲4
Percentage	27.92%	24.55%	27.07%
- Map of Borough Election Results 2014, Colour legend by wards won: Conservative party Liberal Democrats Independents UKIP Labour not contested in 2014
Leader before election
Christopher Garland
Conservative
Leader-elect
n/a

Elections to Maidstone Borough Council were held on 22 May 2014. One-third of the borough council (20 members) were up for election. European Parliament Elections were held on the same day.

== Overall results ==
The Conservatives lost overall control of the council by losing four seats. The Liberal Democrats lost one seat. UKIP gained four seats, and Labour gained one seat.

Maidstone Borough Council
Party	Elected Seats	Total Seats	+/-
Conservative Party	5	25	-4
Liberal Democrats	9	19	-1
Independent	1	5	0
UK Independence Party	4	4	+4
Labour Party	1	2	+1
Total	20	55	
Valid Ballot Papers	37352		
Rejected Ballot Papers	128		
Ballot Papers Issued	37480		
Registered Electors	95612		
Turnout	39.2%		

== Ward results ==
Allington Ward (1)
Candidate	Party	Votes	%
Dan Daley	Liberal Democrats	1,273	50.42%
Andy Airey	UK Independence Party	543	21.50%
Barry Stephen Ginley	Conservative Party	483	19.13%
Marianna Romeojuliet Poliszczuk	Labour Party	168	6.65%
David Michael Thompson	Green Party	58	2.30%
Total		2,525	100.00%
Rejected Ballot Papers		2	
Ballot Papers Issued		2,527	
Registered Electors			
Turnout			

Bearsted Ward (1)
Candidate	Party	Votes	% (Total)	% (Valid)
Mike Cuming	Conservative Party	1,059	38.19%	
Geoff Licence	Independent	654	23.58%	
Sarah Elizabeth Pettit	UK Independence Party	593	21.38%	
Jeanne Mary Gibson	Labour Party	258	9.03%	
Ciaran Dominic Oliver	Green Party	112	4.04%	
Geoffrey Richard Samme	Liberal Democrats	97	3.50%	
Total		2773	100.00%	
Rejected Ballot Papers		10		
Ballot Papers Issued		2783		
Registered Electors				
Turnout				

Bridge Ward (1)
Candidate	Party	Votes	%
David Stewart Pickett	Liberal Democrats	491	31.10%
Stuart James Mallison	Conservative Party	421	26.66%
James Thomas Hill	UK Independence Party	370	23.43%
Sandra Pauline McDowell	Labour Party	164	10.39%
Donna Louise Greenan	Green Party	133	8.42%
Total		1579	100.00%
Rejected Ballot Papers		8	
Ballot Papers Issued		1587	
Registered Electors			
Turnout			

Boxley Ward (1)
Candidate	Party	Votes	%
Derek George Butler	Conservative Party	1035	45.24%
Mike Wardle	UK Independence Party	765	33.44%
Steve Gibson	Labour Party	249	10.88%
Daniel Wright	Liberal Democrats	131	5.73%
Hannah Margaret Patton	Green Party	108	4.72%
Total		2288	100.00%
Rejected Ballot Papers		5	
Ballot Papers Issued		2293	
Registered Electors			
Turnout			

Coxheath and Hunton (1)
Candidate	Party	Votes	%
Brian Richard Edwin Mortimer	Liberal Democrats	966	39.91%
Clive Norman Parker	Conservative Party	654	27.02%
Keith Clement Woollven	UK Independence Party	636	26.28%
Stella Marlyn Randall	Labour Party	164	6.78%
Total		2420	100.00%
Rejected Ballot Papers		16	
Ballot Papers Issued		2436	
Registered Electors			
Turnout			

East Ward (1)
Candidate	Party	Votes	% (Total)	% (Valid)
Nicola Jane Fissenden	Liberal Democrats	895	36.13%	
Gareth Anthony Kendall	UK Independence Party	643	25.96%	
Tony Dennison	Conservative Party	599	24.18%	
Richard John Coates	Labour Party	200	8.07%	
James Edward Shalice	Green Party	140	5.65%	
Total		2477	100.00%	
Rejected Ballot Papers		16		
Ballot Papers Issued		2493		
Registered Electors				
Turnout				

Fant Ward (1)
Candidate	Party	Votes	%
Paul Harper	Labour Party	595	23.62%
Roy Douglas Smith	UK Independence Party	542	21.52%
Stuart Robert Jeffery	Green Party	513	20.37%
Roger James Hogg	Conservative Party	451	17.90%
Sam Roach	Liberal Democrats	418	16.59%
Total		2519	100.00%
Rejected Ballot Papers		12	
Ballot Papers Issued		2531	
Registered Electors			
Turnout			

Harrietsham & Lenham Ward (2)
Candidate	Party	Votes	%
Janetta Sams	Independent	979	29.73%
Eddie Powell	UK Independence Party	573	17.40%
John Raymond Barned	Conservative Party	527	16.00%
Marino Andreas Michaelas	Conservative Party	505	15.34%
Mike Williams	UK Independence Party	479	14.55%
Jean Harvey	Labour Party	129	3.92%
Geoff Harvey	Labour Party	101	3.07%
Total		3293	100.00%
Rejected Ballot Papers		8	
Ballot Papers Issued		2035	
Registered Electors			
Turnout			

Headcorn Ward (1)
Candidate	Party	Votes	%
Martin Round	Conservative Party	868	48.76%
Peter Edwards-Daem	UK Independence Party	580	32.58%
Penelope Anne Kemp	Green Party	208	11.69%
Jim Grogan	Labour Co-Operative	124	6.97%
Total		1780	100.00%
Rejected Ballot Papers		3	
Ballot Papers Issued		1783	
Registered Electors			
Turnout			

Heath Ward (1)
Candidate	Party	Votes	%
James Martin Willis	Liberal Democrats	650	43.05%
Colin Green Taylor	UK Independence Party	322	21.32%
Brian Moss	Conservative Party	307	20.33%
Richard Stewart Chapman	Labour Party	129	10.73%
Irene Lilian Shepherd	Green Party	69	4.57%
Total		1510	100.00%
Rejected Ballot Papers		3	
Ballot Papers Issued		1513	
Registered Electors			
Turnout			

High Street Ward (1)
Candidate	Party	Votes	%
Clive Andrew English	Liberal Democrats	596	30.50%
Jackie Hemsted	UK Independence Party	563	28.81%
Sam Lain-Rose	Conservative Party	336	17.20%
Lawrence Michael Peter Miller	Labour Party	249	12.74%
Wendy Kathleen Lewis	Green Party	146	7.47%
David Charles Savory	Independent	64	3.28%
Total		1,954	100.00%
Rejected Ballot Papers		5	
Ballot Papers Issued		1,959	
Registered Electors			
Turnout			

Marden & Yalding Ward (1)
Candidate	Party	Votes	%
David Christopher Burton	Conservative Party	825	33.81%
Sir Nick Fenn	Liberal Democrats	782	32.05%
Ericka Ann Olivares-Penroz	UK Independence Party	576	23.60%
Edith Maud Davis	Labour Party	158	6.48%
Ian Francis Stewart McDonald	Green Party	99	4.06%
Total		2,440	100.00%
Rejected Ballot Papers		7	
Ballot Papers Issued		2,447	
Registered Electors			
Turnout			

North Ward (2)
Candidate	Party	Votes	%
Tony Peter Harwood	Liberal Democrats	949	25.84%
Thomas Daniel Long	Liberal Democrats	597	16.25%
Charles Richard Elliott	UK Independence Party	529	14.40%
Adrian Bryan Tilley	UK Independence Party	479	13.04%
Michael Hemsley	Conservative Party	380	10.35%
Jeff Tree	Conservative Party	334	9.09%
Keith Adkinson	Labour Party	206	5.61%
Derek Roy Eagle	Green Party	199	5.42%
Total		3,673	100.00%
Rejected Ballot Papers		6	
Ballot Papers Issued		3,679	
Registered Electors			
Turnout			

Shepway North Ward (1)
Candidate	Party	Votes	%
Marion Ann Ring	Conservative Party	1,139	52.25%
Geoff Harvey	Labour Party	589	27.02%
Geoffrey Richard Samme	Liberal Democrats	193	8.85%
Stephen Fraser Muggeridge	Green Party	157	7.20%
Gary Butler	British National Party	102	4.68%
Total		2,180	100.00%
Rejected Ballot Papers		8	
Ballot Papers Issued		2,188	
Registered Electors		6,504	
Turnout		33.64%	

South Ward (1)
Candidate	Party	Votes	%
Mike Hogg	Conservative Party	1,242	45.15%
John Wilson	Liberal Democrats	1,171	42.57%
Richard John Coates	Labour Party	338	12.29%
Total		2,751	100.00%
Rejected Ballot Papers		20	
Ballot Papers Issued		2,771	
Registered Electors		6,258	
Turnout		44.28%	

Staplehurst Ward (1)
Candidate	Party	Votes	%
Richard Lusty	Conservative Party	1,211	64.59%
John Edward Randall	Labour Party	288	15.36%
Ralph Frederick Austin	Liberal Democrats	228	12.16%
Ian Francis Stewart McDonald	Green Party	148	7.89%
Total		1,875	100.00%
Rejected Ballot Papers		15	
Ballot Papers Issued		1,890	
Registered Electors		4,349	
Turnout		43.46%	

Sutton Valence & Langley Ward (1)
Candidate	Party	Votes	%
Paulina Annette Veronica Stockell	Conservative Party	735	73.28%
Jean Harvey	Labour Party	156	15.55%
Susan Austin	Liberal Democrats	112	11.17%
Total		1,003	100.00%
Rejected Ballot Papers		6	
Ballot Papers Issued		1,009	
Registered Electors		2,059	
Turnout		49.00%	
