= 2022 Maidstone Borough Council election =

Local Elections in England

← 2021	5 May 2022	2023 →

18 out of 55 seats to Maidstone Borough Council 28 seats needed for a majority

	First party	Second party	Third party
Party	Conservative	Liberal Democrats	Independent
Last election	29 seats, 47.3%	12 seats, 19.5%	10 seats, 5.2%
Seats won	7	6	1
Seats after	27	12	10
Seat change	▼2	Steady	Steady
Popular vote	12,180	7,984	1,892
Percentage	38.6%	25.3%	6.0%
Swing	▼8.7%	▲5.8%	▲0.8%
	Fourth party	Fifth party
Party	Labour	Green
Last election	4 seats, 14.1%	0 seats, 13.4%
Seats won	3	1
Seats after	5	1
Seat change	▲1	▲1
Popular vote	4,861	4,501
Percentage	15.4%	14.3%
Swing	▲1.3%	▲0.9%
- Winner of each seat at the 2022 Maidstone Borough Council election
Council control before election
Conservative
Council control after election
Conservative

The 2022 Maidstone Borough Council election took place on 5 May 2022, in order to elect 18 out of 55 members to the Maidstone Borough Council. These seats were last up for election in 2018. Members elected in this election would have their seats next up for election in 2024, due to the council opting for a four-year cycle of elections instead of the current format from 2024 onwards.

As the results were declared, the Conservative Party initially lost their majority on the council:

Before 2022 election		After 2022 election	
Party	Seats	Party	Seats
Conservative	29	Conservative	27
Liberal Democrats	12	Liberal Democrats	12
Labour	4	Labour	5
Green	0	Green	1
Independent	10	Independent	10

After the result was declared, but before the first post-election meeting of the council, independent councillor Nick de Wiggondene-Sheppard rejoined the Conservatives (having been elected as a Conservative in 2019 but subsequently left the party). This meant that the Conservatives managed to retain a one seat majority on the council at the annual council meeting on 21 May 2022, retaining control of the authority.

== Results summary ==
2022 Maidstone Borough Council election
Party	This election			Full council			This election		
Party	Seats	Net	Seats %	Other	Total	Total %	Votes	Votes %	+/−
Conservative	7	▼2	38.9	20	27	49.1	12,180	38.6	-8.7
Liberal Democrats	6	Steady	33.3	6	12	21.8	7,984	25.3	+5.8
Independent	1	Steady	5.6	9	10	18.2	1,892	6.0	+0.8
Labour	3	▲1	16.7	2	5	9.1	4,861	15.4	+1.3
Green	1	▲1	5.6	0	1	1.8	4,501	14.3	+0.9
British Democrats	0	Steady	0.0	0	0	0.0	117	0.4	N/A

== Ward results ==
=== Allington ===
Allington
Party	Candidate	Votes	%	±%
Liberal Democrats	Thomas Wilkinson	1,082	46.9	−11.1
Conservative	Eve Burton	870	37.7	+12.9
Labour	John Randall	200	8.7	+0.9
Green	Ian Stewart	155	6.7	−2.6
Majority		212	9.2	
Turnout		2,317		
Liberal Democrats hold		Swing	▼12.0	

=== Bearsted ===
Bearsted
Party	Candidate	Votes	%	±%
Conservative	Sandra Knatchbull	1,373	57.5	−9.2
Liberal Democrats	Ian Chittenden	563	23.6	+6.5
Green	Ciaran Oliver	450	18.9	+2.8
Majority		810	15.7	
Turnout		2,396		
Conservative hold		Swing	▲7.9	

=== Boxley ===
Boxley
Party	Candidate	Votes	%	±%
Conservative	Bob Hinder	1,194	59.4	+0.4
Liberal Democrats	Michael Thompson	577	28.7	+4.5
Green	Susan Parr	239	11.9	N/A
Majority		617	30.7	
Turnout		2,022		
Conservative hold		Swing	▼2.1	

=== Bridge ===
Bridge
Party	Candidate	Votes	%	±%
Green	Stuart Jeffery	820	50.1	+19.2
Conservative	Mitu Chowdhury	483	29.5	−12.9
Liberal Democrats	Chris Passmore	178	10.9	−15.9
Labour	David Reay	157	9.6	N/A
Majority		337	20.6	
Turnout		1,642		
Green gain from Conservative		Swing	▲16.1	

=== Coxheath and Hunton ===
Coxheath and Hunton
Party	Candidate	Votes	%	±%
Conservative	Lottie Parfitt-Reid	1,078	52.6	−6.3
Green	Claire Kehily	507	24.7	+7.9
Liberal Democrats	Simon Wales	465	22.7	−1.6
Majority		571	27.9	
Turnout		2,066		
Conservative hold		Swing	▼7.1	

=== East ===
East
Party	Candidate	Votes	%	±%
Liberal Democrats	Richard Conyard	1,002	48.1	+14.9
Conservative	James Reid	593	28.5	−4.0
Independent	Nikki Fissenden	310	14.9	N/A
Green	Donna Greenan	177	8.5	+0.7
Majority		409	19.6	
Turnout		2,090		
Liberal Democrats hold		Swing	▲9.5	

=== Fant ===
Fant
Party	Candidate	Votes	%	±%
Labour	Paul Harper	1,235	61.0	+17.6
Conservative	Jaison Musindo	379	18.7	−16.2
Liberal Democrats	Julia Batt	215	10.6	N/A
Green	Kimberley Milham	196	9.7	−11.9
Majority		856	42.3	
Turnout		2,043		
Labour hold		Swing	▲16.9	

=== Harrietsham and Lenham ===
Harrietsham and Lenham
Party	Candidate	Votes	%	±%
Independent	Janetta Sams	1,439	77.1	+19.6
Conservative	Sasha Luck	427	22.9	−10.2
Majority		1,012	54.2	
Turnout		1,876		
Independent hold		Swing	▲14.9	

=== Headcorn ===
Headcorn
Party	Candidate	Votes	%	±%
Conservative	Martin Round	888	55.0	−8.9
Green	Derek Eagle	326	20.2	+7.4
Labour	Sarah Barwick	230	14.3	+3.6
Liberal Democrats	Martin Richards	170	10.5	+0.7
Majority		562	34.8	
Turnout		1,630		
Conservative hold		Swing	▼8.2	

=== Heath ===
Heath
Party	Candidate	Votes	%	±%
Liberal Democrats	Ashleigh Kimmance	530	36.1	+1.7
Conservative	Angel Rai	451	30.7	−6.1
Labour	Derek Swan	348	23.7	+4.1
Green	Matthew White	91	6.2	−3.0
Independent	Gary Butler	49	3.3	N/A
Majority		79	5.4	
Turnout		1,472		
Liberal Democrats hold		Swing	▲3.9	

=== High Street ===
High Street
Party	Candidate	Votes	%	±%
Liberal Democrats	Clive English	733	42.6	+5.2
Labour	Richard Coates	375	21.8	+1.9
Conservative	Dani Stephenson	374	21.7	−6.8
Green	Steven Cheeseman	239	13.9	−0.3
Majority		358	20.8	
Turnout		1,735		
Liberal Democrats hold		Swing	▲1.7	

=== Marden and Yalding ===
Marden and Yalding
Party	Candidate	Votes	%	±%
Conservative	David Burton	1,220	53.9	−7.8
Green	Mick Summersgill	595	26.3	+8.0
Labour	Alwyn Whitlock	450	19.9	+8.5
Majority		625	27.6	
Turnout		2,283		
Conservative hold		Swing	▼7.9	

=== North ===
North
Party	Candidate	Votes	%	±%
Liberal Democrats	Tony Harwood	971	51.4	+11.2
Conservative	Scott Hahnefeld	487	25.8	−11.1
Labour	Jo Burns	292	15.5	+3.0
Green	Stephen Thompson	139	7.4	−3.0
Majority		484	22.4	
Turnout		1,900		
Liberal Democrats hold		Swing	▲11.2	

=== Park Wood ===
Park Wood
Party	Candidate	Votes	%	±%
Labour	Dan Wilkinson	532	45.4	+7.2
Conservative	Jaime Graymead	432	36.8	−15.5
Green	Caroline Jessel	113	9.6	N/A
Liberal Democrats	Rob Field	96	8.2	−1.3
Majority		100	8.6	
Turnout		1,181		
Labour gain from Conservative		Swing	▲11.4	

=== Shepway North ===
Shepway North
Party	Candidate	Votes	%	±%
Conservative	Alan Bartlett	653	40.4	−10.9
Labour	Henry Morgan	389	24.0	+5.8
Liberal Democrats	Joe Higson	350	21.6	+5.8
Green	Stephen Muggeridge	132	8.2	−0.9
Independent	Melanie Butler	94	5.8	+0.3
Majority		264	16.4	
Turnout		1,622		
Conservative hold		Swing	▼8.4	

=== Shepway South ===
Shepway South
Party	Candidate	Votes	%	±%
Labour	Maureen Cleator	341	39.8	+17.7
Conservative	John Barned	333	38.9	−0.5
British Democrats	Lawrence Rustem	117	13.7	N/A
Liberal Democrats	Geoff Samme	65	7.6	−0.2
Majority		8	0.9	
Turnout		858		
Labour hold		Swing	▲9.1	

=== South ===
South
Party	Candidate	Votes	%	±%
Liberal Democrats	Derek Mortimer	1,083	48.0	+5.2
Conservative	Paul Thomas	780	34.6	−5.0
Labour	Marlyn Randall	212	9.4	+0.3
Green	Simon Milham	180	8.0	−0.4
Majority		303	13.4	
Turnout		2,265		
Liberal Democrats hold		Swing	▲5.1	

=== Staplehurst ===
Staplehurst
Party	Candidate	Votes	%	±%
Conservative	John Perry	818	48.0	−7.1
Labour	Rory Silkin	632	37.1	+26.2
Green	Meg Shepherd-Foster	255	15.0	+3.6
Majority		186	10.9	
Turnout		1,724		
Conservative hold		Swing	▼16.7	
