= 2002 Maidstone Borough Council election =

2002 UK local government election

Results of the 2002 Maidstone District Council election

The 2002 Maidstone Borough Council election took place on 2 May 2002 to elect members of Maidstone Borough Council in Kent, England. The whole council was up for election with boundary changes since the last election in 2000. The council stayed under no overall control.

== Background ==
All 55 seats were being contested in the election after boundary changes were implemented. The boundary changes kept the number of seats the same at 55, but reduced the wards from 28 to 26.

139 candidates stood in the election, made up of 45 Conservatives, 42 Liberal Democrats, 29 Labour, 10 Green, 8 United Kingdom Independence Party and 5 independents.

== Election result ==
Overall turnout in the election was 31.7%.

Maidstone local election result 2002
Party	Seats	Gains	Losses	Net gain/loss	Seats %	Votes %	Votes	+/−
Liberal Democrats	21			-1	38.2	36.9	27,105	+5.5%
Conservative	19			+3	34.5	38.6	28,352	-7.3%
Labour	12			0	21.8	15.6	11,433	-2.0%
Independent	3			-2	5.5	5.1	3,716	+1.1%
Green	0			0	0	2.7	2,021	+1.7%
UKIP	0			0	0	1.2	877	+1.2%

== Ward results ==
Allington (3)
Party	Candidate	Votes	%	±%
Liberal Democrats	Daniel Daley	1,642		
Liberal Democrats	Malcolm Robertson	1,501		
Liberal Democrats	Cynthia Robertson	1,500		
Conservative	Alison Swannick	385		
Labour	Marianna Poliszczuk	229		
Labour	Wendy Hollands	206		
UKIP	Gareth Kendall	128		
Turnout		5,591	37.6	

Barming
Party	Candidate	Votes	%	±%
Conservative	Paul Oldham	801	89.5	
Liberal Democrats	John Featherstone	94	10.5	
Majority		707	79.0	
Turnout		895	48.0	

Bearsted (3)
Party	Candidate	Votes	%	±%
Independent	Patricia Marshall	1,528		
Conservative	Richard Ash	1,277		
Conservative	Allan Bradshaw	1,198		
Conservative	Gladys Haskett	1,111		
Liberal Democrats	Sheila Chittenden	530		
Labour	Jeanne Gibson	461		
Green	Hazel Chazal	256		
Turnout		6,361	39.9	

Bouhgton Monchelsea and Chart Sutton
Party	Candidate	Votes	%	±%
Independent	Michael Fitzgerald	639	68.7	
Conservative	Michael Oben	291	31.3	
Majority		348	37.4	
Turnout		930	45.0	

Boxley (3)
Party	Candidate	Votes	%	±%
Conservative	Derek Butler	809		
Conservative	Michael Yates	757		
Conservative	Robert Barnes	701		
Liberal Democrats	Ian Chittenden	517		
Liberal Democrats	John Doherty	476		
Liberal Democrats	Jean Harwood	475		
Independent	John Munson	329		
Labour	Stephen Gibson	256		
Green	Peter Bagshaw	196		
Turnout		4,516	25.4	

Bridge (2)
Party	Candidate	Votes	%	±%
Conservative	Brian Moss	458		
Conservative	Derek Nicholson	437		
Liberal Democrats	Trevor Matthews	427		
Liberal Democrats	Michael Tucker	426		
Labour	Richard Coates	195		
Labour	Linda Cogger	186		
UKIP	Keith Woollven	65		
Turnout		2,194	28.5	

Coxheath and Hunton (3)
Party	Candidate	Votes	%	±%
Liberal Democrats	Brian Mortimer	988		
Liberal Democrats	Moira Walter	925		
Liberal Democrats	John Williams	896		
Conservative	Adrian Brindle	789		
Conservative	Paul Butcher	698		
Conservative	John Swannick	634		
Labour	John Hughes	295		
UKIP	Duncan Spencer	89		
Turnout		5,314	35.2	

Detling and Thurnham
Party	Candidate	Votes	%	±%
Conservative	John Horne	413	63.1	
Liberal Democrats	John Watson	161	24.6	
Labour	Ray Huson	81	12.4	
Majority		252	38.5	
Turnout		655	29.0	

Downswood and Otham
Party	Candidate	Votes	%	±%
Independent	Frederick Winckless	453	78.8	
Conservative	Angela Bentley	122	21.2	
Majority		331	57.6	
Turnout		575	27.0	

East (3)
Party	Candidate	Votes	%	±%
Liberal Democrats	Margaret Shaw	1,090		
Liberal Democrats	Patrick Sellar	1,030		
Liberal Democrats	David Naghi	944		
Conservative	Alan Warner	741		
Conservative	Christopher Garland	721		
Conservative	Scott Hahnefeld	713		
Labour	Susan Burfield	260		
UKIP	Anthony Robertson	83		
Turnout		5,582	34.1	

Fant (3)
Party	Candidate	Votes	%	±%
Labour	Roger Berriman	726		
Labour	Merello D'Souza	644		
Labour	John Morrison	621		
Liberal Democrats	Shona Stevens	600		
Liberal Democrats	Patrick Schnell	494		
Conservative	Jacqueline Wooder	336		
Conservative	Jeremy Hindle	323		
Green	Kathryn Moss	231		
Green	Ian Mcdonald	202		
UKIP	Stephen Dean	142		
Turnout		4,319	28.1	

Harrietsham and Lenham (2)
Party	Candidate	Votes	%	±%
Labour	Tom Sams	830		
Labour	Janetta Sams	651		
Conservative	Richard Allen	649		
Liberal Democrats	Barbara Harris	437		
Liberal Democrats	Stephen Morris	321		
Turnout		2,888	41.7	

Headcorn (2)
Party	Candidate	Votes	%	±%
Conservative	Jenefer Gibson	1,117		
Conservative	Ian Thick	985		
Green	Penelope Kemp	501		
Turnout		2,603	38.5	

Heath (2)
Party	Candidate	Votes	%	±%
Liberal Democrats	Mick Stevens	522		
Liberal Democrats	Peter Hooper	483		
Conservative	Malcolm Parker	262		
Labour	Patrick Coates	124		
Turnout		1,391	26.3	

High Street (3)
Party	Candidate	Votes	%	±%
Liberal Democrats	Clive English	752		
Liberal Democrats	Denise Joy	639		
Liberal Democrats	Frances Wilson	620		
Conservative	Angharad Davies	327		
Labour	Leonard Burfield	323		
Conservative	Sally Nicholson	322		
Green	Benjamin Hawkins	140		
UKIP	Terence Kendall	140		
Green	Sheila Kennedy	129		
Green	Johann Sikora	59		
Turnout		3,451	22.9	

Leeds
Party	Candidate	Votes	%	±%
Conservative	Peter Parvin	469	70.2	
Liberal Democrats	Michael Shaw	108	16.2	
Labour	Elizabeth Stevens	91	13.6	
Majority		361	54.0	
Turnout		668	36.0	

Loose
Party	Candidate	Votes	%	±%
Liberal Democrats	Hugh Laing	317	51.8	
Conservative	Kevan Hodges	295	48.2	
Majority		22	3.6	
Turnout		612	33.0	

Marden and Yalding (3)
Party	Candidate	Votes	%	±%
Conservative	Roderick Nelson-Gracie	1,009		
Conservative	Elizabeth McGannan	982		
Conservative	Simon Anthonisz	978		
Liberal Democrats	Patricia Gerrish	549		
Liberal Democrats	Peter Williams	465		
Labour	Michael Jackson	412		
Turnout		4,395	29.1	

North (3)
Party	Candidate	Votes	%	±%
Liberal Democrats	Tony Harwood	1,020		
Liberal Democrats	Jennifer Paterson	974		
Liberal Democrats	Mervyn Warner	841		
Conservative	Valerie Parker	402		
Conservative	Carolyn Warner	390		
Labour	Edith Davis	226		
UKIP	Margaret Kendall	109		
Turnout		3,962	28.2	

North Downs
Party	Candidate	Votes	%	±%
Conservative	Daphne Parvin	459	63.8	
Liberal Democrats	John Cobbett	175	24.3	
Labour	Keith Adkinson	86	11.9	
Majority		284	39.4	
Turnout		720	37.0	

Park Wood (2)
Party	Candidate	Votes	%	±%
Labour	Daniel Moriarty	420		
Labour	James Cook	352		
Conservative	Sandra Nahab	208		
Turnout		980	20.9	

Shepway North (3)
Party	Candidate	Votes	%	±%
Labour	Frances Brown	799		
Labour	Julie Skinner	717		
Labour	Wendy Marlow	716		
Conservative	Christopher Hodges	624		
Conservative	Peter Veal	528		
Liberal Democrats	Phillip Palmby	288		
Liberal Democrats	Geoffrey Samme	229		
Green	Janet Richards	159		
Green	Stephen Muggeridge	148		
Turnout		4,208	25.7	

Shepway South (2)
Party	Candidate	Votes	%	±%
Labour	Daniel Murphy	578		
Labour	Kenneth Stevens	516		
Conservative	Marion Ring	388		
Turnout		1,482	23.6	

South (3)
Party	Candidate	Votes	%	±%
Liberal Democrats	Malcolm Luxton	1,136		
Liberal Democrats	Ronald Ellis	897		
Liberal Democrats	John Wilson	818		
Independent	Alan Smith	767		
Conservative	Alan Chell	712		
Conservative	Lesley Polley	655		
Conservative	Theresa Stirk	555		
UKIP	John Botting	121		
Turnout		5,661	37.0	

Staplehurst (2)
Party	Candidate	Votes	%	±%
Conservative	Eric Hotson	922		
Conservative	Richard Lusty	896		
Liberal Democrats	Steven Williams	300		
Liberal Democrats	Thomas Burnham	290		
Labour	Allan Rimmer	231		
Labour	John Randall	201		
Turnout		2,840	31.6	

Sutton Valence and Langley
Party	Candidate	Votes	%	±%
Conservative	Paulina Stockell	503	70.7	
Liberal Democrats	Sarah Gould	208	29.3	
Majority		295	41.5	
Turnout		711	33.0	
