= 2021 Maidstone Borough Council election =

2021 UK local government election

Map showing the results of the 2021 Maidstone Borough Council election

The 2021 Maidstone Borough Council election took place on 6 May 2021, in order to elect members to the Maidstone Borough Council. These elections were originally due to take place on 7 May 2020, but due to the COVID-19 pandemic, the decision was taken to postpone them by a year. These elections took place in conjunction with other local elections on the same day. Nominations for Elections were published on 9 April 2021.

== Background ==
These seats were last contested in 2016. These were due for re-election in 2020, but all local elections in the United Kingdom were postponed due to the COVID-19 pandemic. One of the main issues in this election was housing, and it was reported that Maidstone had built 146% of its projected target, more than any other local authority in Kent. Neighbourhood Plan Referendums also took place in Boughton and Monchelsea and Lenham

These seats are due to be up for re-election in 2024.

== Results summary ==
2021 Maidstone Borough Council election
Party	This election			Full council			This election		
Party	Seats	Net	Seats %	Other	Total	Total %	Votes	Votes %	+/−
Conservative	12	▲5	63.2	17	29	52.7	16,433	47.3	+7.7
Liberal Democrats	4	▼4	21.1	13	17	30.9	6,785	19.5	-7.1
Independent	2	Steady	10.5	3	5	9.1	1,819	5.2	-1.8
Labour	1	Steady	5.3	3	4	7.3	4,881	14.1	+3.8
Green	0	Steady	0.0	0	0	0.0	4,655	13.4	+2.4
For Britain	0	Steady	0.0	0	0	0.0	25	0.1	New
UKIP	0	▼1	0.0	0	0	0.0	N/A	N/A	-5.4

== Ward results ==
=== Allington ===
Allington
Party	Candidate	Votes	%	±%
Conservative	Stan Forecast	1,084	46	+22
Liberal Democrats	Diana Joy Lewins	932	39	−11
Labour	John Edward Randall	178	8	−1
Green	Steven Mark Cheeseman	169	7	+6
Majority		152	7	
Turnout		2393		
Conservative gain from Liberal Democrats		Swing		

=== Barming and Teston ===
Barming and Teston
Party	Candidate	Votes	%	±%
Independent	Fay Lynette Gooch	607	65	−14
Conservative	Andrew James Catley	204	22	+13
Labour	Dennis Luchman	66	7	+3
Green	Kimberley Joan Milham	50	5	+2
Majority		403	43	
Turnout		941		
Independent hold		Swing		

=== Bearsted ===
Bearsted
Party	Candidate	Votes	%	±%
Conservative	Denis Charles Spooner	1,787	70	+33
Labour Co-op	Jim Grogan	399	16	+7
Green	Ciaran Dominic Oliver	381	15	+12
Majority		1388	54	
Turnout		2583		
Conservative hold		Swing		

=== Boughton Monchelsea and Chart Sutton ===
Boughton Monchelsea and Chart Sutton
Party	Candidate	Votes	%	±%
Independent	Steve Munford	512	53	−7
Conservative	Karen Louise Chappell-Tay	271	28	+9
Green	Caroline Rosemary Jessel	140	14	+8
Labour	Bob Millar	43	4	0
Majority		241	25	
Turnout		974		
Independent hold		Swing		

=== Boxley ===
Boxley
Party	Candidate	Votes	%	±%
Conservative	Heidi Jacqueline Ann Bryant	1,481	67.0	+8.0
Labour	Marsha Grace Beverley Todd	298	13.5	N/A
Green	Ian Francis Stewart McDonald	229	10.4	N/A
Liberal Democrats	Mike Thompson	204	9.2	−15.0
Majority		1,183	53.5	
Turnout		2,212		
Conservative hold		Swing		

=== Bridge ===
Bridge
Party	Candidate	Votes	%	±%
Conservative	Tom Cannon	743	42.4	+1.4
Green	Donna Louise Greenan	541	30.9	+16.7
Liberal Democrats	Ben Webster-Whiting	469	26.8	−7.2
Majority		202	11.5	
Turnout		1,753		
Conservative hold		Swing		

=== Coxheath and Hunton ===
Coxheath and Hunton
Party	Candidate	Votes	%	±%
Conservative	Simon Noel Webb	1,380	58.9	+23.4
Liberal Democrats	Peter Charles Stephen Lewis	570	24.3	−33.9
Green	Claire Louise Kehily	394	16.8	N/A
Majority		810	34.6	
Turnout		2,370		
Conservative gain from Liberal Democrats		Swing		

=== East ===
East
Party	Candidate	Votes	%	±%
Liberal Democrats	Martin Ashley Richard Cox	762	33.2	−14.2
Conservative	Harprit Singh Dogra	747	32.5	+3.9
Independent	Kate Hammond	333	14.5	N/A
Labour	Marlyn Randall	274	11.9	−1.0
Green	James Edward Shalice	179	7.8	−3.4
Majority		15	0.7	
Turnout		2,295		
Liberal Democrats hold		Swing		

=== Fant ===
Fant
Party	Candidate	Votes	%	±%
Labour	Patrick Coates	940	43.4	+8.3
Conservative	Mitu Chowdhury	756	34.9	+6.4
Green	Christopher John Veasey Turner	468	21.6	+7.3
Majority		184	8.5	
Turnout		2,164		
Labour hold		Swing		

=== Headcorn ===
Headcorn
Party	Candidate	Votes	%	±%
Conservative	Ziggy Trzebinski	1,127	63.9	−10.9
Green	Susan Theresa Parr	226	12.8	N/A
Labour	Barwich Sarah Joan	188	10.7	−0.1
Liberal Democrats	Martin Hougaard Richards	172	9.8	−4.7
Reform UK	Twiz Stripp	50	2.8	N/A
Majority		901	50.0	
Turnout		1,763		
Conservative hold		Swing		

=== Heath ===
Heath
Party	Candidate	Votes	%	±%
Conservative	Peter David Holmes	577	36.8	+8.3
Liberal Democrats	Vizzard Bryan Charles	540	34.4	−11.9
Labour	Jo Burns	307	19.6	+0.4
Green	Stephen Roy Thompson	145	9.2	+3.2
Majority		37	2.4	
Turnout		1,569		
Conservative gain from Liberal Democrats		Swing		

=== High Street ===
High Street
Party	Candidate	Votes	%	±%
Liberal Democrats	Denise June Joy	675	37.4	−10.5
Conservative	Sanjiv Kumar Brajkishore	514	28.5	+8.2
Labour	Richard John Coates	360	19.9	+0.4
Green	Gemma Sue Battrum	257	14.2	+1.9
Majority		161	8.9	
Turnout		1,806		
Liberal Democrats hold		Swing		

=== Marden and Yalding ===
Marden and Yalding
Party	Candidate	Votes	%	±%
Conservative	Claudine Jane Russell	1,695	61.7	+14.8
Green	Mike Summersgill	504	18.3	−3.9
Labour	Natalie Victoria Allen	313	11.4	+0.4
Liberal Democrats	Stephen James Goffredi	175	6.4	N/A
Reform UK	Justin Gregory Andre Randall	60	2.2	N/A
Majority		1,191	43.4	
Turnout		2,747		
Conservative hold		Swing		

=== North ===
North
Party	Candidate	Votes	%	±%
Liberal Democrats	Michelle Hastie	786	40.2	N/A
Conservative	Scott Hahnefeld	722	36.9	+4.4
Labour	David John Reay	244	12.5	−14.9
Green	Derek Roy Eagle	203	10.4	−14.4
Majority		64	3.3	
Turnout		1,955		
Liberal Democrats hold		Swing		

=== North Downs ===
North Downs
Party	Candidate	Votes	%	±%
Conservative	Patrik Garten	472	49.7	−22.5
Green	Jeffery Stuart Robert	407	42.8	+29.6
Labour	Theresa Ruby Lyons	46	4.8	N/A
Liberal Democrats	Zeina Toric-Azad	25	2.6	−12.1
Majority		65	6.9	
Turnout		950		
Conservative hold		Swing		

=== Park Wood ===
Park Wood
Party	Candidate	Votes	%	±%
Conservative	Lewis John McKenna	647	52.3	+4.9
Labour	Dan Wilkinson	473	38.2	−7.2
Liberal Democrats	Andrew Francis Cockersole	117	9.5	+2.3
Majority		174	14.1	
Turnout		1,237		
Conservative hold		Swing		

=== Shepway North ===
Shepway North
Party	Candidate	Votes	%	±%
Conservative	Paul Charles Cooper	926	51.3	+12.4
Labour	Lesley Frances McKay	329	18.2	+1.5
Liberal Democrats	Joe Higson	286	15.8	+0.5
Green	Stephen Fraser Muggeridge	165	9.1	+2.2
Independent	Gary Butler	100	5.5	+2.9
Majority		597	33.1	
Turnout		1,806		
Conservative hold		Swing		

=== Shepway South ===
Shepway South
Party	Candidate	Votes	%	±%
Conservative	Gary Cooke	375	39.4	+4.3
Independent	Eddie Powell	267	28.1	N/A
Labour	Maureen Cleator	210	22.1	−18.7
Liberal Democrats	Arnold Tay	74	7.8	N/A
For Britain	Lawrence Rustem	25	2.6	N/A
Majority		108	11.3	
Turnout		951		
Conservative gain from UKIP		Swing		

=== South ===
South
Party	Candidate	Votes	%	±%
Liberal Democrats	Paul John Wilby	998	42.8	−15.9
Conservative	Will Dinley	925	39.6	+14.9
Labour	Kim Roberts	213	9.1	+2.3
Green	Simon Milham	197	8.4	+2.8
Majority		73	3.2	
Turnout		2,333		
Liberal Democrats hold		Swing		
