= 2007 Maidstone Borough Council election =

2007 UK local government election

Results of the 2007 Maidstone District Council election

The 2007 Maidstone Borough Council election took place on 3 May 2007 to elect members of Maidstone Borough Council in Kent, England. One third of the council was up for election and the council stayed under no overall control.

After the election, the composition of the council was:

- Conservative 26
- Liberal Democrat 21
- Labour 4
- Independent 4

== Background ==
Before the election the Conservatives were the largest party on the council with 27 seats, compared to 20 Liberal Democrats, 4 Labour and 4 independent councillors. 20 seats were up for election, with 2 of these in Bridge and South wards being by-elections after the resignation of the previous councillors.

The Conservatives held the seats of Detling and Thurnham and Sutton Valence and Langley without a contest after no other candidates stood in those seats. In total 64 candidates stood in the election, comprising 20 Conservatives, 16 Liberal Democrats, 11 Green Party, 10 Labour, 5 independents and 2 British National Party. As well as the by-elections, 2 sitting councillors did not stand in the election, Liberal Democrat John Williams from Coxheath and Hunton ward and independent Janetta Sams from Harrietsham and Lenham ward.

== Election result ==
The results saw no party win a majority on the council after the Liberal Democrats made a net gain of 1 seat from the Conservatives. This reduced the Conservatives to 26 seats and was a disappointment for them as Maidstone had been one of the party's top 10 targets in the 2007 local elections. Overall turnout in the election was 37.68%.

Maidstone local election result 2007
| Party | Seats | Gains | Losses | Net gain/loss | Seats % | Votes % | Votes | +/− |
|---|---|---|---|---|---|---|---|---|
| Conservative | 9 | 1 | 2 | -1 | 45.0 | 49.2 | 15,968 | +2.5 |
| Liberal Democrats | 9 | 2 | 1 | +1 | 45.0 | 33.2 | 10,773 | +2.5 |
| Independent | 2 | 0 | 0 | 0 | 10.0 | 5.4 | 1,762 | -0.2 |
| Labour | 0 | 0 | 0 | 0 | 0.0 | 5.9 | 1,905 | -5.3 |
| Green | 0 | 0 | 0 | 0 | 0.0 | 5.3 | 1,722 | +0.8 |
| BNP | 0 | 0 | 0 | 0 | 0.0 | 1.0 | 329 | +1.0 |

== Ward results ==
Allington
| Party | Candidate | Votes | % | ±% |
|---|---|---|---|---|
| Liberal Democrats | Cynthia Robertson | 1,517 | 63.9 | +1.3 |
| Conservative | Jeff Curwood | 684 | 28.8 | +2.6 |
| Labour | Marianna Poliszczuk | 174 | 7.3 | +1.3 |
| Majority | | 833 | 35.1 | −1.3 |
| Turnout | | 2,375 | 42.7 | +1.0 |
| Liberal Democrats hold | | Swing | | |

Bearsted
| Party | Candidate | Votes | % | ±% |
|---|---|---|---|---|
| Conservative | Allan Bradshaw | 1,935 | 70.0 | +28.7 |
| Liberal Democrats | Sheila Chittenden | 510 | 18.5 | +18.5 |
| Green | Edward Wallace | 319 | 11.3 | +6.8 |
| Majority | | 1,425 | 51.5 | |
| Turnout | | 2,764 | 42.9 | +0.4 |
| Conservative hold | | Swing | | |

Boxley
| Party | Candidate | Votes | % | ±% |
|---|---|---|---|---|
| Conservative | Malcolm Greer | 1,415 | 67.2 | +1.5 |
| Liberal Democrats | John Doherty | 534 | 25.3 | +1.5 |
| BNP | Gareth Veitch | 158 | 7.5 | +7.5 |
| Majority | | 881 | 41.8 | −0.1 |
| Turnout | | 2,107 | 32.9 | +4.3 |
| Conservative hold | | Swing | | |

Bridge
| Party | Candidate | Votes | % | ±% |
|---|---|---|---|---|
| Liberal Democrats | David Pickett | 746 | 50.5 | +12.8 |
| Conservative | Martin Cluett | 611 | 41.4 | −2.0 |
| Green | Andrew Waldie | 120 | 8.1 | −2.8 |
| Majority | | 135 | 9.1 | |
| Turnout | | 1,477 | 34.7 | +1.5 |
| Liberal Democrats hold | | Swing | | |

Coxheath and Hunton
| Party | Candidate | Votes | % | ±% |
|---|---|---|---|---|
| Liberal Democrats | Colin Parr | 1,239 | 47.8 | −0.3 |
| Conservative | John Wilson | 1,221 | 47.1 | +0.4 |
| Labour | Michael Casserley | 130 | 5.0 | −0.2 |
| Majority | | 18 | 0.7 | −0.8 |
| Turnout | | 2,590 | 47.7 | +5.6 |
| Liberal Democrats hold | | Swing | | |

Detling and Thurnham
| Party | Candidate | Votes | % | ±% |
|---|---|---|---|---|
| Conservative | John Horne | unopposed | | |
| Conservative hold | | Swing | | |

Downswood and Otham
| Party | Candidate | Votes | % | ±% |
|---|---|---|---|---|
| Independent | David Marchant | 405 | 50.8 | −25.5 |
| Independent | Gordon Newton | 230 | 28.9 | +28.9 |
| Conservative | Mark Hodges | 162 | 20.3 | +1.6 |
| Majority | | 175 | 22.0 | −35.6 |
| Turnout | | 797 | 37.9 | +8.9 |
| Independent hold | | Swing | | |

East
| Party | Candidate | Votes | % | ±% |
|---|---|---|---|---|
| Liberal Democrats | David Naghi | 1,386 | 54.1 | +16.5 |
| Conservative | Jamie Devlin | 912 | 35.6 | −16.0 |
| Labour | Michael Beckwith | 167 | 6.5 | −0.3 |
| Green | James Shalice | 97 | 3.8 | +3.8 |
| Majority | | 474 | 18.5 | |
| Turnout | | 2,562 | 41.4 | +2.8 |
| Liberal Democrats hold | | Swing | | |

Fant
| Party | Candidate | Votes | % | ±% |
|---|---|---|---|---|
| Liberal Democrats | Nick Schnell | 773 | 40.2 | +2.9 |
| Conservative | James Ross | 454 | 23.6 | −2.5 |
| Green | Stuart Jeffery | 342 | 17.8 | +5.1 |
| Labour | Keith Adkinson | 245 | 12.7 | −4.4 |
| Independent | Carol Vizzard | 109 | 5.7 | −1.1 |
| Majority | | 319 | 16.6 | +5.5 |
| Turnout | | 1,923 | 33.6 | +4.3 |
| Liberal Democrats hold | | Swing | | |

Harrietsham and Lenham
| Party | Candidate | Votes | % | ±% |
|---|---|---|---|---|
| Independent | Tom Sams | 941 | 45.8 | +45.8 |
| Conservative | Gary Cooke | 834 | 40.6 | −16.9 |
| Liberal Democrats | Stephen Morris | 230 | 11.2 | +11.2 |
| Green | Sarah Goodwin | 50 | 2.4 | +2.4 |
| Majority | | 107 | 5.2 | |
| Turnout | | 2,055 | 48.1 | +7.0 |
| Independent hold | | Swing | | |

High Street
| Party | Candidate | Votes | % | ±% |
|---|---|---|---|---|
| Liberal Democrats | Fran Wilson | 758 | 46.8 | +0.6 |
| Conservative | Paul Butcher | 533 | 32.9 | −1.3 |
| Labour | Richard Coates | 182 | 11.2 | −1.3 |
| Green | Wendy Lewis | 148 | 9.1 | +9.1 |
| Majority | | 225 | 13.9 | +1.9 |
| Turnout | | 1,621 | 27.8 | +2.8 |
| Liberal Democrats hold | | Swing | | |

Leeds
| Party | Candidate | Votes | % | ±% |
|---|---|---|---|---|
| Conservative | Peter Parvin | 639 | 84.7 | +15.8 |
| Labour | Elizabeth Stevens | 115 | 15.3 | +2.3 |
| Majority | | 524 | 69.5 | +18.7 |
| Turnout | | 754 | 40.1 | −1.4 |
| Conservative hold | | Swing | | |

Loose
| Party | Candidate | Votes | % | ±% |
|---|---|---|---|---|
| Conservative | Ben Sherreard | 413 | 50.4 | +7.9 |
| Liberal Democrats | Hugh Laing | 358 | 43.7 | −8.2 |
| Green | Angela Wooi | 48 | 5.9 | +5.9 |
| Majority | | 55 | 6.7 | |
| Turnout | | 819 | 44.5 | +3.4 |
| Conservative gain from Liberal Democrats | | Swing | | |

Marden and Yalding
| Party | Candidate | Votes | % | ±% |
|---|---|---|---|---|
| Conservative | Annabelle Blackmore | 1,324 | 62.7 | −9.7 |
| Liberal Democrats | Carol Jacques | 422 | 20.0 | −7.6 |
| Labour | Edith Davis | 216 | 10.2 | +10.2 |
| Green | Ian McDonald | 151 | 7.1 | +7.1 |
| Majority | | 902 | 42.7 | −2.2 |
| Turnout | | 2,113 | 36.5 | +1.0 |
| Conservative hold | | Swing | | |

North
| Party | Candidate | Votes | % | ±% |
|---|---|---|---|---|
| Liberal Democrats | Marvyn Warner | 973 | 54.0 | −3.4 |
| Conservative | Jeff Tree | 500 | 27.8 | −0.4 |
| Green | Derek Eagle | 145 | 8.1 | +0.6 |
| Labour | Patrick Coates | 106 | 5.9 | −1.0 |
| Independent | Maureen Cleator | 77 | 4.3 | +4.3 |
| Majority | | 473 | 26.3 | −2.8 |
| Turnout | | 1,801 | 32.0 | −1.4 |
| Liberal Democrats hold | | Swing | | |

Shepway North
| Party | Candidate | Votes | % | ±% |
|---|---|---|---|---|
| Conservative | Marion Ring | 989 | 53.8 | +6.3 |
| Labour | James Carney | 359 | 19.5 | −4.3 |
| Liberal Democrats | Geoffrey Samme | 201 | 10.9 | +10.9 |
| BNP | William Hitches | 171 | 9.3 | +9.3 |
| Green | Stephen Muggeridge | 119 | 6.5 | −3.1 |
| Majority | | 630 | 34.3 | +10.6 |
| Turnout | | 1,839 | 30.0 | +0.1 |
| Conservative hold | | Swing | | |

South (2)
| Party | Candidate | Votes | % | ±% |
|---|---|---|---|---|
| Liberal Democrats | John Wilson | 1,234 | | |
| Liberal Democrats | Ian Chittenden | 1,139 | | |
| Conservative | Keith Andrews | 1,113 | | |
| Conservative | Alan Chell | 1,102 | | |
| Green | Penny Kemp | 183 | | |
| Turnout | | 4,771 | 40.7 | |
| Liberal Democrats gain from Conservative | | Swing | | |
| Liberal Democrats gain from Conservative | | Swing | | |

Staplehurst
| Party | Candidate | Votes | % | ±% |
|---|---|---|---|---|
| Conservative | Richard Lusty | 1,127 | 70.1 | +3.4 |
| Liberal Democrats | Thomas Burnham | 270 | 16.8 | −3.8 |
| Labour | John Randall | 211 | 13.1 | +0.4 |
| Majority | | 857 | 53.3 | +7.2 |
| Turnout | | 1,608 | 35.7 | −0.6 |
| Conservative hold | | Swing | | |

Sutton Valence and Langley
| Party | Candidate | Votes | % | ±% |
|---|---|---|---|---|
| Conservative | Paulina Stockell | unopposed | | |
| Conservative hold | | Swing | | |
