= 2023 Maidstone Borough Council election =

2023 UK local government election

← 2022	4 May 2023	2024 →

18 out of 55 seats to Maidstone Borough Council 28 seats needed for a majority

	First party	Second party	Third party
Leader	David Burton	Clive English	Steve Munford
Party	Conservative	Liberal Democrats	Independent
Last election	27 seats, 38.6%	12 seats, 25.3%	10 seats, 6.0%
Seats before	28	12	9
Seats after	24	12	10
	Fourth party	Fifth party
Leader	Maureen Cleator
Party	Labour	Green
Last election	5 seats, 15.4%	1 seat, 14.3%
Seats before	5	1
Seats after	6	3
- Winner of each seat at the 2023 Maidstone Borough Council election
Leader before election
David Burton
Conservative
No overall control
Leader after election
David Burton
Conservative
No overall control

The 2023 Maidstone Borough Council election took place on 4 May 2023 to elect members of Maidstone Borough Council in Kent, England. This was on the same day as other local elections in England.

Two weeks before the election, the council went into no overall control when the Conservatives lost their majority due to the resignation of Robert Eves, leaving them with 27 out of the 54 occupied seats.

The council stayed under no overall control following the election, with the Conservatives forming the largest group. They continued to hold the council's leadership positions as a minority administration.

== Summary ==
=== Election result ===
2023 Maidstone Borough Council election
Party	This election			Full council			This election		
Party	Seats	Net	Seats %	Other	Total	Total %	Votes	Votes %	+/−
Conservative	5	▼4	83.3	19	24	43.6	9,708	32.7	–5.9
Liberal Democrats	5	▼1	27.8	7	12	21.8	6,786	22.9	–2.4
Independent	4	▲2	22.2	6	10	18.2	3,350	11.3	+5.3
Labour	2	▲1	11.1	4	6	10.9	4,631	15.6	+0.2
Green	2	▲2	11.1	1	3	5.5	4,995	16.8	+2.5
Reform UK	0	0	0.0	0	0	0.0	129	0.4	N/A
Heritage	0	0	0.0	0	0	0.0	77	0.3	N/A

== Ward results ==
The Statement of Persons Nominated, which details the candidates standing in each ward, was released by Maidstone Borough Council following the close of nominations on 4 April 2023. The results for each ward were as follows:

=== Allington ===
Allington
Party	Candidate	Votes	%	±%
Liberal Democrats	Cynthia Robertson*	923	39.4	−18.6
Conservative	Laura Kennedy	639	27.3	+2.5
Green	Rachel Rodwell	569	24.3	+15.0
Labour	Marianna Poliszczuk	213	9.1	+1.3
Majority				
Turnout		2,344		
Liberal Democrats hold		Swing		

=== Bearsted ===
Bearsted
Party	Candidate	Votes	%	±%
Conservative	Val Springett*	1,204	58.0	−8.7
Green	Ciaran Oliver	294	14.2	−1.9
Liberal Democrats	Ian Chittenden	283	13.6	−3.5
Labour	Mark Tickner	219	10.5	N/A
Heritage	Sean Turner	77	3.7	N/A
Majority				
Turnout		2,077		
Conservative hold		Swing		

=== Boxley ===
Boxley
Party	Candidate	Votes	%	±%
Independent	Vanessa Jones	1,012	44.1	N/A
Conservative	Anne Brindle*	784	34.2	−24.8
Labour	Stella Randall	263	11.5	N/A
Liberal Democrats	Geoffrey Samme	236	10.3	−13.9
Majority				
Turnout		2,295		
Independent gain from Conservative		Swing		

=== Coxheath & Hunton ===
Coxheath & Hunton
Party	Candidate	Votes	%	±%
Conservative	James Reid	788	39.7	+4.2
Green	Claire Kehily	697	35.1	N/A
Liberal Democrats	Bryan Vizzard	275	13.8	−44.4
Labour	John Randall	226	11.4	+5.1
Majority				
Turnout		1,986		
Conservative gain from Liberal Democrats		Swing		

=== Detling & Thurnham ===
Detling & Thurnham
Party	Candidate	Votes	%	±%
Green	Stephen Thompson	485	49.7	+24.3
Conservative	Christopher Waters	411	42.1	−15.9
Liberal Democrats	Zeina Toric-Azad	80	8.2	−8.4
Majority				
Turnout		976		
Green gain from Conservative		Swing		

=== Downswood & Otham ===
Downswood & Otham
Party	Candidate	Votes	%	±%
Independent	Gordon Newman*	510	62.8	+4.2
Labour	Theresa Lyons	118	14.5	N/A
Conservative	Scott Walker	115	14.2	−10.4
Green	David Murray	69	8.5	+0.4
Majority				
Turnout		812		
Independent hold		Swing		

=== East ===
East
Party	Candidate	Votes	%	±%
Liberal Democrats	David Naghi*	1,051	52.9	+5.5
Conservative	Ronald Burke	497	25.0	−3.6
Labour	Derek Swan	273	13.8	+0.9
Green	Matthew White	164	8.3	−2.9
Majority				
Turnout		1,985		
Liberal Democrats hold		Swing		

=== Fant ===
Fant
Party	Candidate	Votes	%	±%
Labour	Margaret Rose*	760	43.5	+8.4
Green	Ian McDonald	383	21.9	+7.6
Conservative	Jaison Musindo	354	20.2	−8.3
Liberal Democrats	Rojo Kurien	252	14.4	−1.1
Majority				
Turnout		1,749		
Labour hold		Swing		

=== Harrietsham & Lenham ===
Harrietsham & Lenham
Party	Candidate	Votes	%	±%
Independent	Tom Sams*	1,296	72.6	+15.1
Conservative	Andrew Bye	325	18.2	−14.9
Labour	Ryan Slaughter	164	9.2	+5.3
Majority				
Turnout		1,785		
Independent hold		Swing		

=== High Street ===
High Street
Party	Candidate	Votes	%	±%
Liberal Democrats	Dinesh Khadka*	641	37.2	−10.7
Labour	David Collier	401	23.2	+3.7
Conservative	Reiss Cordrey	352	20.4	+0.1
Green	Steven Cheeseman	331	19.2	+6.9
Majority				
Turnout		1,725		
Liberal Democrats hold		Swing		

=== Leeds ===
Leeds
Party	Candidate	Votes	%	±%
Conservative	Gill Fort*	389	61.2	−7.7
Liberal Democrats	Robert Field	138	21.7	N/A
Green	Caroline Jessel	109	17.1	N/A
Majority				
Turnout		636		
Conservative hold		Swing		

=== Loose ===
Loose
Party	Candidate	Votes	%	±%
Independent	Susan Grigg*	236	34.9	−19.8
Liberal Democrats	Simon Wales	179	26.5	−28.2
Conservative	Kenneth Amakye	165	24.4	−6.2
Labour	Alan Le Grys	60	8.9	+5.4
Green	Donna Greenan	36	5.3	−5.9
Majority				
Turnout		676		
Independent gain from Liberal Democrats		Swing		

=== Marden & Yalding ===
Marden & Yalding
Party	Candidate	Votes	%	±%
Conservative	Annabelle Blackmore*	1,005	43.4	−3.5
Green	Mick Summersgill	891	38.5	+16.3
Labour	Sarah Barwick	265	11.4	+0.4
Liberal Democrats	Chris Passmore	154	6.7	N/A
Majority				
Turnout		2,315		
Conservative hold		Swing		

=== North ===
North
Party	Candidate	Votes	%	±%
Liberal Democrats	Michael Thompson	930	51.2	N/A
Conservative	Scott Hahnefeld	397	21.8	−10.7
Labour	Rachel Slaughter	292	16.1	−11.3
Green	Kimberley Milham	199	10.9	−13.9
Majority				
Turnout		1,818		
Liberal Democrats gain from Conservative		Swing		

=== Shepway North ===
Shepway North
Party	Candidate	Votes	%	±%
Labour	Joanna Wilkinson	602	37.1	+20.4
Conservative	Alison Colyer	577	35.6	−3.3
Liberal Democrats	Joe Higson	184	11.3	−4.0
Green	Stephen Muggeridge	146	9.0	+2.1
Independent	Gary Butler	114	7.0	+4.4
Majority				
Turnout		1,623		
Labour gain from Conservative		Swing		

=== South ===
South
Party	Candidate	Votes	%	±%
Liberal Democrats	Brian Clark*	1,153	53.4	−5.3
Conservative	Emily Hudson	408	18.9	−5.8
Labour	Dennis Luchmun	197	9.1	+2.3
Independent	Paul Thomas	182	8.4	N/A
Reform UK	Graham Jarvis	129	6.0	N/A
Green	Simon Milham	92	4.3	−1.3
Majority				
Turnout		2,161		
Liberal Democrats hold		Swing		

=== Staplehurst ===
Staplehurst
Party	Candidate	Votes	%	±%
Conservative	Paddy Riordan	942	50.3	−4.8
Labour	Rory Silkin	578	30.9	+20.0
Liberal Democrats	Thomas Burnham	219	11.7	−0.5
Green	Kelly Rigden	132	7.1	−4.3
Majority				
Turnout		1,871		
Conservative hold		Swing		

=== Sutton Valence & Langley ===
Sutton Valence & Langley
Party	Candidate	Votes	%	±%
Green	Derek Eagle	398	47.3	+31.3
Conservative	Wendy Young*	356	42.3	−26.3
Liberal Democrats	Martin Richards	88	10.5	−4.9
Majority				
Turnout		842		
Green gain from Conservative		Swing		
