= 2019 Maidstone Borough Council election =

2019 UK local government election

Results of the 2019 Maidstone District Council election

The 2019 Maidstone Borough Council election took place on 2 May 2019 to elect members of Maidstone Borough Council in England. This was on the same day as other local elections.

== Results summary ==
2019 Maidstone Borough Council election
| Party | This election | | | Full council | | | This election | | |
| Party | Seats | Net | Seats % | Other | Total | Total % | Votes | Votes % | +/− |
|---|---|---|---|---|---|---|---|---|---|
| Conservative | 9 | ▼1 | 50.0 | 16 | 25 | 45.5 | 11,548 | 39.6 | |
| Liberal Democrats | 6 | Steady | 33.3 | 14 | 20 | 36.4 | 7,758 | 26.6 | |
| Independent | 2 | Steady | 11.1 | 3 | 5 | 9.1 | 2,052 | 7.0 | |
| Labour | 1 | ▲1 | 5.6 | 3 | 4 | 7.3 | 3,005 | 10.3 | |
| UKIP | 0 | Steady | 0.0 | 1 | 1 | 1.8 | 1,562 | 5.4 | |
| Green | 0 | Steady | 0.0 | 0 | 0 | 0.0 | 3,212 | 11.0 | |

== Ward results ==
=== Allington ===
Allington
| Party | Candidate | Votes | % | ±% |
|---|---|---|---|---|
| Liberal Democrats | Cynthia Robertson | 1,180 | 58.0 | |
| Conservative | Barry Ginley | 505 | 24.8 | |
| Green | Ben Knowles | 189 | 9.3 | |
| Labour | Wendy Hollands | 159 | 7.8 | |
| Majority | | | | |
| Turnout | | 2,033 | | |
| Liberal Democrats hold | | Swing | | |

=== Bearsted ===
Bearsted
| Party | Candidate | Votes | % | ±% |
|---|---|---|---|---|
| Conservative | Val Springett | 1,468 | 66.7 | |
| Liberal Democrats | Ian Chittenden | 377 | 17.1 | |
| Green | Colin Chuter | 355 | 16.1 | |
| Majority | | | | |
| Turnout | | | | |
| Conservative hold | | Swing | | |

=== Boxley ===
Boxley
| Party | Candidate | Votes | % | ±% |
|---|---|---|---|---|
| Conservative | Anne Brindle | 1,155 | 59.0 | |
| Liberal Democrats | Michael Thompson | 474 | 24.2 | |
| UKIP | Mark McGiffin | 329 | 16.8 | |
| Majority | | | | |
| Turnout | | | | |
| Conservative hold | | Swing | | |

=== Coxheath & Hutton ===
Coxheath & Hutton
| Party | Candidate | Votes | % | ±% |
|---|---|---|---|---|
| Liberal Democrats | Richard Webb | 1,223 | 58.2 | |
| Conservative | Simon Webb | 753 | 35.5 | |
| Labour | Richard Coates | 134 | 6.3 | |
| Majority | | | | |
| Turnout | | | | |
| Liberal Democrats hold | | Swing | | |

=== Detling & Thurnham ===
Detling & Thurnham
| Party | Candidate | Votes | % | ±% |
|---|---|---|---|---|
| Conservative | Nick de Wiggondene-Sheppard | 475 | 58.0 | |
| Green | James Shalice | 208 | 25.4 | |
| Liberal Democrats | Andrew Cockersole | 136 | 16.6 | |
| Majority | | | | |
| Turnout | | | | |
| Conservative hold | | Swing | | |

=== Downswood & Otham ===
Downswood & Otham
| Party | Candidate | Votes | % | ±% |
|---|---|---|---|---|
| Independent | Gordon Newton | 434 | 58.6 | |
| Conservative | Gary Cooke | 182 | 24.6 | |
| Independent | Paul Wooding | 65 | 8.8 | |
| Green | Stuart Jeffrery | 60 | 8.1 | |
| Majority | | | | |
| Turnout | | | | |
| Independent hold | | Swing | | |

=== East ===
East
| Party | Candidate | Votes | % | ±% |
|---|---|---|---|---|
| Liberal Democrats | David Naghi | 942 | 47.4 | |
| Conservative | Harprit Dogra | 568 | 28.6 | |
| Labour | Jo Burns | 256 | 12.9 | |
| Green | Christopher Turner | 223 | 11.2 | |
| Majority | | | | |
| Turnout | | | | |
| Liberal Democrats hold | | Swing | | |

=== Fant ===
Fant
| Party | Candidate | Votes | % | ±% |
|---|---|---|---|---|
| Labour | Margaret Rose | 659 | 35.1 | |
| Conservative | Graham Jarvis | 536 | 28.5 | |
| Liberal Democrats | David Pickett | 291 | 15.5 | |
| Green | Ian McDonald | 269 | 14.3 | |
| Independent | Sue Delamere | 124 | 6.6 | |
| Majority | | | | |
| Turnout | | | | |
| Labour gain from Conservative | | Swing | | |

=== Harrietsham & Lenham ===
Harrietsham & Lenham
| Party | Candidate | Votes | % | ±% |
|---|---|---|---|---|
| Independent | Tom Sams | 1,107 | 57.5 | |
| Conservative | Chris Roots | 638 | 33.1 | |
| Green | Susan Parr | 105 | 5.5 | |
| Labour | Stephen Rogers | 75 | 3.9 | |
| Majority | | | | |
| Turnout | | | | |
| Independent hold | | Swing | | |

=== High Street ===
High Street
| Party | Candidate | Votes | % | ±% |
|---|---|---|---|---|
| Liberal Democrats | Dinesh Khadka | 852 | 47.9 | |
| Conservative | Andi Okoye | 360 | 20.3 | |
| Labour | Barbara Neill | 346 | 19.5 | |
| Green | Kimmy Milham | 219 | 12.3 | |
| Majority | | | | |
| Turnout | | | | |
| Liberal Democrats hold | | Swing | | |

=== Leeds ===
Leeds
| Party | Candidate | Votes | % | ±% |
|---|---|---|---|---|
| Conservative | Gill Fort | 420 | 68.9 | |
| UKIP | Ian Stevens | 190 | 31.1 | |
| Majority | | | | |
| Turnout | | | | |
| Conservative hold | | Swing | | |

=== Loose ===
Loose
| Party | Candidate | Votes | % | ±% |
|---|---|---|---|---|
| Liberal Democrats | Susan Grigg | 390 | 54.7 | |
| Conservative | Bryan Hillman | 218 | 30.6 | |
| Green | Donna Greenan | 80 | 11.2 | |
| Labour | Richard Atkins | 25 | 3.5 | |
| Majority | | | | |
| Turnout | | | | |
| Liberal Democrats hold | | Swing | | |

=== Marden & Yalding ===
Marden & Yalding
| Party | Candidate | Votes | % | ±% |
|---|---|---|---|---|
| Conservative | Annabelle Blackmore | 1,092 | 46.9 | |
| Green | Mike Summersgill | 518 | 22.2 | |
| UKIP | Pamela Watts | 330 | 14.2 | |
| Labour | Dan Wilkinson | 257 | 11.0 | |
| Independent | June Winston | 133 | 5.7 | |
| Majority | | | | |
| Turnout | | | | |
| Conservative hold | | Swing | | |

=== North ===
North
| Party | Candidate | Votes | % | ±% |
|---|---|---|---|---|
| Conservative | Roberts Eves | 579 | 32.5 | |
| Labour | Maureen Cleator | 489 | 27.4 | |
| Green | Steve Cheeseman | 443 | 24.8 | |
| UKIP | Steve Bax | 273 | 15.3 | |
| Majority | | | | |
| Turnout | | | | |
| Conservative hold | | Swing | | |

=== Shepway North ===
Shepway North
| Party | Candidate | Votes | % | ±% |
|---|---|---|---|---|
| Conservative | Marion Ring | 635 | 38.9 | |
| Labour | Richard Neill | 272 | 16.7 | |
| UKIP | Stephen Young | 268 | 16.4 | |
| Liberal Democrats | Michael Hicks | 249 | 15.3 | |
| Green | Stephen Muggeridge | 112 | 6.9 | |
| Independent | Jon Hicks | 52 | 3.2 | |
| Independent | Gary Butler | 43 | 2.6 | |
| Majority | | | | |
| Turnout | | | | |
| Conservative hold | | Swing | | |

=== South ===
South
| Party | Candidate | Votes | % | ±% |
|---|---|---|---|---|
| Liberal Democrats | Brian Clark | 1,332 | 58.7 | |
| Conservative | Les Letchford | 561 | 24.7 | |
| Labour | Patrick Coates | 154 | 6.8 | |
| Green | Simon Milham | 128 | 5.6 | |
| Independent | Yolande Kenward | 94 | 4.1 | |
| Majority | | | | |
| Turnout | | | | |
| Liberal Democrats hold | | Swing | | |

=== Staplehurst ===
Staplehurst
| Party | Candidate | Votes | % | ±% |
|---|---|---|---|---|
| Conservative | Louise Brice | 907 | 55.1 | |
| Liberal Democrats | Jeremy Watson | 201 | 12.2 | |
| Green | John Wright | 187 | 11.4 | |
| Labour | Marlyn Randall | 179 | 10.9 | |
| UKIP | Barry Watts | 172 | 10.4 | |
| Majority | | | | |
| Turnout | | | | |
| Conservative hold | | Swing | | |

=== Sutton Valence & Langley ===
Sutton Valence & Langley
| Party | Candidate | Votes | % | ±% |
|---|---|---|---|---|
| Conservative | Wendy Young | 496 | 68.6 | |
| Green | Derek Eagle | 116 | 16.0 | |
| Liberal Democrats | Richard Francis | 111 | 15.4 | |
| Majority | | | | |
| Turnout | | | | |
| Conservative hold | | Swing | | |
