= 2006 Maidstone Borough Council election =

2006 election in England

Results of the 2006 Maidstone District Council election

The 2006 Maidstone Borough Council election took place on 4 May 2006 to elect members of Maidstone Borough Council in Kent, England. One third of the council was up for election and the council stayed under no overall control.

After the election, the composition of the council was:

- Conservative 27
- Liberal Democrat 19
- Labour 6
- Independent 3

== Background ==
Before the election the Conservatives were the largest party on the council with 24 seats, compared to 20 Liberal Democrat, 8 Labour and 3 independent councillors. 18 seats were contested in the election, with the Conservatives the only party to contest every seat. Labour had 15 candidates, the Liberal Democrats 14, Green Party 6, United Kingdom Independence Party 4 and there were 3 independent candidates. Both the Liberal Democrat leader of the council, Mick Stevens, and the Labour group leader, Daniel Murphy, stood down at the election, while the Conservative and Independent group leaders, Eric Hotson and Pat Marshall, defended Staplehurst and Bearsted wards respectively.

== Election result ==
The results saw the Conservatives make the 4 gains they required to win a majority, but fall a seat short after also losing one seat. This meant the council remained under no overall control as it had been since 1983, with the Conservatives on 27 seats, the Liberal Democrats on 19, Labour 6 and there were 3 independents. Overall turnout in the election was 37.3%.

Maidstone local election result 2006
Party	Seats	Gains	Losses	Net gain/loss	Seats %	Votes %	Votes	+/−
Conservative	9	4	1	+3	50.0	46.7	16,102	+6.6%
Liberal Democrats	6	1	2	-1	33.3	30.7	10,579	-0.8%
Labour	2	0	2	-2	11.1	11.2	3,859	-2.3%
Independent	1	0	0	0	5.6	5.6	1,928	+3.6%
Green	0	0	0	0	0	4.5	1,542	+3.0%
UKIP	0	0	0	0	0	1.4	495	-9.5%

== Ward results ==
Allington
Party	Candidate	Votes	%	±%
Liberal Democrats	Daniel Daley	1,562	62.6	+10.1
Conservative	Jeffery Curwood	653	26.2	+1.6
Labour	Marianna Poliszczuk	149	6.0	−4.0
UKIP	Gareth Kendall	130	5.2	−7.8
Majority		909	36.4	+8.5
Turnout		2,494	41.7	−2.7
Liberal Democrats hold		Swing		

Bearsted
Party	Candidate	Votes	%	±%
Independent	Patricia Marshall	1,459	48.6	+48.6
Conservative	Michael Cuming	1,238	41.3	−19.3
Labour	Jeanne Gibson	169	5.6	−5.0
Green	Edward Wallace	135	4.5	+4.5
Majority		221	7.3	
Turnout		3,001	42.5	−2.0
Independent hold		Swing		

Boxley
Party	Candidate	Votes	%	±%
Conservative	Derek Butler	1,349	65.7	+20.5
Liberal Democrats	Sheila Chittenden	489	23.8	−8.2
Labour	Frances Brown	215	10.5	+2.5
Majority		860	41.9	+28.6
Turnout		2,053	28.6	−9.7
Conservative hold		Swing		

Bridge
Party	Candidate	Votes	%	±%
Conservative	Brian Moss	659	43.4	+5.7
Liberal Democrats	Alan Cocks	573	37.7	−3.1
Green	Stuart Jeffery	166	10.9	+10.9
Labour	Keith Adkinson	122	8.0	−4.5
Majority		86	5.7	
Turnout		1,520	33.2	−8.2
Conservative hold		Swing		

Coxheath and Hunton
Party	Candidate	Votes	%	±%
Liberal Democrats	Brian Mortimer	1,212	48.1	+8.0
Conservative	John Wilson	1,175	46.7	+6.3
Labour	Michael Casserley	131	5.2	−4.3
Majority		37	1.4	
Turnout		2,518	42.1	−3.1
Liberal Democrats hold		Swing		

East
Party	Candidate	Votes	%	±%
Conservative	Mark Wooding	1,371	51.6	+22.1
Liberal Democrats	Ian Chittenden	999	37.6	−10.0
Labour	Michael Beckwith	180	6.8	−2.4
UKIP	Anthony Robertson	105	4.0	−6.2
Majority		372	14.0	
Turnout		2,655	38.6	−0.9
Conservative gain from Liberal Democrats		Swing		

Fant
Party	Candidate	Votes	%	±%
Liberal Democrats	Stephen Beerling	656	37.3	+7.4
Conservative	Jamie Devlin	460	26.1	+5.0
Labour	Patrick Coates	301	17.1	−16.4
Green	Ian McDonald	223	12.7	+6.8
Independent	Carol Vizzard	120	6.8	+6.8
Majority		196	11.2	
Turnout		1,760	29.3	−8.0
Liberal Democrats gain from Conservative		Swing		

Harrietsham and Lenham
Party	Candidate	Votes	%	±%
Conservative	David Marshall	1,079	57.5	+13.1
Labour	Tom Sams	797	42.5	−2.1
Majority		282	15.0	
Turnout		1,876	41.1	+1.3
Conservative gain from Labour		Swing		

Headcorn
Party	Candidate	Votes	%	±%
Conservative	Jenefer Gibson	1,094	60.9	−2.7
Green	Penelope Kemp	701	39.1	+31.0
Majority		393	21.9	−30.4
Turnout		1,795	41.9	−5.4
Conservative hold		Swing		

Heath
Party	Candidate	Votes	%	±%
Liberal Democrats	Julia Batt	664	48.8	−4.4
Conservative	Helen Aronson	585	43.0	+14.6
Labour	Margaret Taylor	111	8.2	−3.1
Majority		79	5.8	−19.0
Turnout		1,360	33.4	−2.0
Liberal Democrats hold		Swing		

High Street
Party	Candidate	Votes	%	±%
Liberal Democrats	Clive English	737	46.2	+4.5
Conservative	Mark Mears	545	34.2	+7.5
Labour	Edith Davis	200	12.5	−3.5
UKIP	John Stanford	112	7.0	−8.6
Majority		192	12.0	−3.1
Turnout		1,594	25.0	−5.5
Liberal Democrats hold		Swing		

Marden and Yalding
Party	Candidate	Votes	%	±%
Conservative	Roderick Nelson-Gracie	1,475	72.4	+22.8
Liberal Democrats	Geoffrey Samme	561	27.6	−1.3
Majority		914	44.9	+24.2
Turnout		2,036	35.5	−4.2
Conservative hold		Swing		

North
Party	Candidate	Votes	%	±%
Liberal Democrats	Tony Harwood	1,077	57.4	+6.2
Conservative	Derek Nicholson	530	28.2	+3.2
Green	James Shalice	141	7.5	+3.4
Labour	Richard Coates	129	6.9	−1.8
Majority		547	29.1	+2.8
Turnout		1,877	33.4	−3.4
Liberal Democrats hold		Swing		

Park Wood
Party	Candidate	Votes	%	±%
Labour	Daniel Moriarty	315	34.9	+4.5
Liberal Democrats	Robert Field	308	34.1	+10.1
Conservative	Robert Hinder	279	30.9	+3.7
Majority		7	0.8	−2.5
Turnout		902	28.7	+0.5
Labour hold		Swing		

Shepway North
Party	Candidate	Votes	%	±%
Conservative	Michael Yates	870	47.5	+5.4
Labour	John Hughes	436	23.8	−5.7
Independent	Gillian Annan	349	19.1	+19.1
Green	Stephen Muggeridge	176	9.6	+5.1
Majority		434	23.7	+11.1
Turnout		1,831	29.9	−3.7
Conservative gain from Labour		Swing		

Shepway South
Party	Candidate	Votes	%	±%
Labour	Anthony Hull	397	37.1	−0.2
Conservative	Charles Worsfold	386	36.0	+3.9
UKIP	Stephen Dean	148	13.8	−5.2
Liberal Democrats	Michael Shaw	140	13.1	+1.6
Majority		11	1.0	−4.2
Turnout		1,071	25.2	−3.2
Labour hold		Swing		

South
Party	Candidate	Votes	%	±%
Conservative	Bruce Pollington	1,269	50.1	+7.1
Liberal Democrats	Malcolm Luxton	1,266	49.9	+11.4
Majority		3	0.1	−4.3
Turnout		2,535	42.1	−0.1
Conservative gain from Liberal Democrats		Swing		

Staplehurst
Party	Candidate	Votes	%	±%
Conservative	Eric Hotson	1,085	66.7	+2.8
Liberal Democrats	Thomas Burnham	335	20.6	−3.1
Labour	Alan Rimmer	207	12.7	+0.3
Majority		750	46.1	+5.9
Turnout		1,627	36.3	+6.3
Conservative hold		Swing		
