= 2000 Maidstone Borough Council election =

2000 UK local government election

The 2000 Maidstone Borough Council election took place on 4 May 2000 to elect members of Maidstone Borough Council in Kent, England. One third of the council was up for election and the council stayed under no overall control.

After the election, the composition of the council was

- Liberal Democrat 22
- Conservative 16
- Labour 12
- Independent 5

== Campaign ==
Before the election no party had a majority, with the Liberal Democrats the largest party on the council. Asylum seekers was reported as being a big issue in the election, after a rise in council tax from Kent County Council was partly put down to asylum seekers in the county. The Conservative party said it was boosted in the election by pledges of a "crackdown" made by the national party leader William Hague.

== Election result ==
Overall turnout in the election was 27.1%.

Maidstone local election result 2000
Party	Seats	Gains	Losses	Net gain/loss	Seats %	Votes %	Votes	+/−
Liberal Democrats	7	1	1	0	36.8	31.4	7,155	-1.0%
Conservative	6	1	0	+1	31.6	45.9	10,463	+8.7%
Labour	4	1	2	-1	21.1	17.6	4,012	-8.4%
Independent	2	0	0	0	10.5	4.0	920	+0.5%
Green	0	0	0	0	0	1.0	229	+0.1%

== Ward results ==
Allington
Party	Candidate	Votes	%	±%
Liberal Democrats	Cynthia Robertson	1,188	68.5	−4.4
Conservative	Valerie Parker	397	22.9	+8.7
Labour	Richard Coates	149	8.6	−4.4
Majority		791	45.6	−13.1
Turnout		1,734	30.0	+0.3
Liberal Democrats hold		Swing		

Barming
Party	Candidate	Votes	%	±%
Conservative	Paul Oldham	883	90.6	
Liberal Democrats	Shona Stevens	59	6.1	
Labour	Patrick Coates	33	3.4	
Majority		824	84.5	
Turnout		975	52.2	
Conservative hold		Swing		

Bearsted
Party	Candidate	Votes	%	±%
Conservative	Richard Ash	1,251	76.4	+9.3
Labour	Jeanne Gibson	213	13.0	−3.7
Liberal Democrats	Sheila Chittenden	173	10.6	−5.7
Majority		1,038	63.4	+13.0
Turnout		1,637	32.2	+0.0
Conservative hold		Swing		

Boughton Monchelsea
Party	Candidate	Votes	%	±%
Independent	Michael Fitzgerald	433	50.2	
Conservative	Frank Holding	377	43.7	
Labour	Jacqueline Lyons	52	6.0	
Majority		56	6.5	
Turnout		862	41.5	
Independent hold		Swing		

Boxley
Party	Candidate	Votes	%	±%
Conservative	Michael Yates	1,062	67.2	
Labour	Stephen Gibson	278	17.6	
Liberal Democrats	John Doherty	240	15.2	
Majority		784	49.6	
Turnout		1,580	25.3	
Conservative hold		Swing		

Bridge
Party	Candidate	Votes	%	±%
Labour	Merello D'Souza	668	39.6	+2.6
Conservative	Derek Nicholson	546	32.3	+4.1
Liberal Democrats	Trevor Matthews	403	23.9	−7.0
Green	Ian McDonald	71	4.2	+0.2
Majority		122	7.2	+1.1
Turnout		1,688	26.4	+3.6
Labour hold		Swing		

Coxheath
Party	Candidate	Votes	%	±%
Liberal Democrats	Brian Mortimer	573	53.8	
Conservative	Alan Larcombe	419	39.3	
Labour	Susan Burfield	73	6.9	
Majority		154	14.5	
Turnout		1,065	34.9	
Liberal Democrats hold		Swing		

Detling
Party	Candidate	Votes	%	±%
Conservative	Daphne Parvin	440	83.3	
Liberal Democrats	James Bartrick	53	10.0	
Labour	Raymond Huson	35	6.6	
Majority		387	73.3	
Turnout		528	34.9	
Conservative hold		Swing		

East
Party	Candidate	Votes	%	±%
Liberal Democrats	Patrick Sellar	834	54.5	+1.7
Conservative	Scott Hahnefeld	544	35.5	+3.0
Labour	Karen Forbes	153	10.0	−4.8
Majority		290	18.9	−1.4
Turnout		1,531	25.6	−0.1
Liberal Democrats hold		Swing		

Farleigh
Party	Candidate	Votes	%	±%
Liberal Democrats	John Williams	385	57.0	
Conservative	Bryan Ransom	290	43.0	
Majority		95	14.1	
Turnout		675	45.1	
Liberal Democrats hold		Swing		

Headcorn
Party	Candidate	Votes	%	±%
Conservative	Jenefer Gibson	1,011	75.4	
Liberal Democrats	Richard Fryd	224	16.7	
Labour	Elizabeth Stevens	106	7.9	
Majority		787	58.7	
Turnout		1,341	36.7	
Conservative hold		Swing		

Heath
Party	Candidate	Votes	%	±%
Liberal Democrats	John Watson	700	49.5	−1.3
Labour	John Tolputt	361	25.5	+1.5
Conservative	Malcolm Parker	352	24.9	+1.3
Majority		339	24.0	−2.7
Turnout		1,413	24.0	+1.7
Liberal Democrats gain from Labour		Swing		

High Street
Party	Candidate	Votes	%	±%
Liberal Democrats	Clive English	514	49.9	+6.4
Conservative	Alex Hunter	241	23.4	+2.9
Labour	Leonard Burfield	236	22.9	−9.4
Green	Sheila Kennedy	39	3.8	+0.1
Majority		273	26.5	+15.3
Turnout		1,030	22.1	−2.4
Liberal Democrats hold		Swing		

Marden
Party	Candidate	Votes	%	±%
Independent	Elizabeth McGannan	487	41.2	
Conservative	Simon Anthonisz	445	37.6	
Labour	Michael Casserley	172	14.6	
Liberal Democrats	Patricia Gerrish	77	6.5	
Majority		42	3.6	
Turnout		1,182	31.2	
Independent hold		Swing		

North
Party	Candidate	Votes	%	±%
Liberal Democrats	Jennifer Paterson	762	59.3	+2.2
Conservative	John Brooks	341	26.5	−2.9
Labour	Keith Adkinson	136	10.6	−0.6
Green	James Shalice	46	3.6	+1.3
Majority		421	32.8	+5.1
Turnout		1,285	22.9	−2.9
Liberal Democrats hold		Swing		

Park Wood
Party	Candidate	Votes	%	±%
Labour	John Morrison	497	57.4	−4.5
Conservative	Sandra Nahab	239	27.6	+6.4
Liberal Democrats	Jeanne Harwood	102	11.8	−1.7
Green	David Currer	28	3.2	−0.2
Majority		258	29.8	−11.0
Turnout		866	18.7	+0.7
Labour hold		Swing		

Shepway East
Party	Candidate	Votes	%	±%
Labour	Daniel Murphy	281	41.1	−13.9
Conservative	Claire Watts	274	40.1	+16.7
Liberal Democrats	Ian Chittenden	129	18.9	−2.6
Majority		7	1.0	−30.6
Turnout		684	16.1	−0.5
Labour gain from Liberal Democrats		Swing		

Shepway West
Party	Candidate	Votes	%	±%
Labour	Frances Brown	394	48.0	−17.0
Conservative	Peter Veal	381	46.5	+11.5
Green	Stephen Muggeridge	45	5.5	+5.5
Majority		13	1.6	−28.3
Turnout		820	18.8	−0.4
Labour hold		Swing		

South
Party	Candidate	Votes	%	±%
Conservative	Alan Chell	970	51.5	+8.2
Liberal Democrats	Sarah Gould	739	39.2	+1.2
Labour	Rosemary Long	175	9.3	−9.4
Majority		231	12.3	+7.0
Turnout		1,884	27.9	+1.9
Conservative gain from Labour		Swing		
