= 2010 Maidstone Borough Council election =

2010 UK local government election

Results of the 2010 Maidstone District Council election

The 2010 Maidstone Borough Council election took place on 6 May 2010 to elect members of Maidstone Borough Council in Kent, England. One third of the council was up for election and the Conservative Party stayed in overall control of the council.

After the election, the composition of the council was:

- Conservative 28
- Liberal Democrat 23
- Independent 4

== Election result ==
The results saw the Conservatives hold control of the council after winning half of the seats being elected. This meant the Conservatives remained on 28 seats, while the Liberal Democrats gained 2 to hold 23 seats. Meanwhile, 2 independents lost seats, meaning there were 4 independents on the council after the election. Overall turnout in the election was 66%.

The Liberal Democrats gained 3 seats from the Conservatives in the wards of Bridge, East and South, including defeating the cabinet member for leisure and Conservative deputy leader, Brian Moss, in Bridge. However the Conservatives took a seat back from the Liberal Democrats in Park Wood and the Conservatives also gained 2 seats from independents. The Conservatives gains from independents came in Bearsted and Shepway South, with the independent group leader, Pat Marshall, losing in Bearsted.

Maidstone local election result 2010
Party	Seats	Gains	Losses	Net gain/loss	Seats %	Votes %	Votes	+/−
Conservative	9	3	3	0	50.0	43.5	28,266	-6.2%
Liberal Democrats	9	3	1	+2	50.0	36.0	23,390	+3.3%
Independent	0	0	2	-2	0	5.7	3,710	+1.7%
Labour	0	0	0	0	0	9.5	6,182	+2.8%
Green	0	0	0	0	0	3.9	2,540	-2.1%
UKIP	0	0	0	0	0	1.2	762	+0.4%
National Front	0	0	0	0	0	0.2	146	+0.2%

== Ward results ==
Allington
Party	Candidate	Votes	%	±%
Liberal Democrats	Dan Daley	2,705	63.3	+3.7
Conservative	Andrew Lehegarat	1,178	27.6	−2.4
Labour	Marianna Poliszczuk	292	6.8	+2.3
Green	Rebecca Matthews	100	2.3	−0.1
Majority		1,527	35.7	+6.1
Turnout		4,275		
Liberal Democrats hold		Swing		

Bearsted
Party	Candidate	Votes	%	±%
Conservative	Heather Langley	2,546	50.4	−24.3
Independent	Pat Marshall	1,768	35.0	+35.0
Labour	Jim Grogan	539	10.7	+10.7
Green	Ciaran Oliver	196	3.9	−2.9
Majority		778	15.4	−40.7
Turnout		5,049		
Conservative gain from Independent		Swing		

Boxley
Party	Candidate	Votes	%	±%
Conservative	Derek Butler	2,796	60.2	−18.6
Liberal Democrats	John Watson	1,064	22.9	+7.2
Labour	Steve Gibson	618	13.3	+13.3
Green	John Aust	165	3.6	−2.1
Majority		1,732	37.3	−25.8
Turnout		4,643		
Conservative hold		Swing		

Bridge
Party	Candidate	Votes	%	±%
Liberal Democrats	David Pickett	1,345	46.2	+3.5
Conservative	Brian Moss	1,181	40.6	−4.2
Labour	Bruce Heald	269	9.2	+2.5
Green	Robin Kinrade	117	4.0	−1.9
Majority		164	5.6	
Turnout		2,912		
Liberal Democrats gain from Conservative		Swing		

Coxheath and Hunton
Party	Candidate	Votes	%	±%
Liberal Democrats	Brian Mortimer	2,394	58.1	+12.7
Conservative	Simon Elliott	1,480	35.9	−15.0
UKIP	Keith Woolven	162	3.9	+3.9
Green	Andrew Waldie	85	2.1	+2.1
Majority		914	22.2	
Turnout		4,121		
Liberal Democrats hold		Swing		

East
Party	Candidate	Votes	%	±%
Liberal Democrats	Jane Naghi	2,324	52.8	−3.9
Conservative	Scott Hahnefeld	1,458	33.1	−4.3
Labour	Patrick Coates	280	6.4	+6.4
UKIP	Gareth Kendall	225	5.1	+5.1
Green	Sandra McDowell	116	2.6	−3.3
Majority		866	19.7	
Turnout		4,403		
Liberal Democrats gain from Conservative		Swing		

Fant
Party	Candidate	Votes	%	±%
Liberal Democrats	Steve Beerling	1,704	43.6	+16.0
Conservative	James Cook	1,344	34.4	+1.1
Green	Stuart Jeffery	480	12.3	−3.7
Labour	Keith Adkinson	382	9.8	−13.3
Majority		360	9.2	
Turnout		3,910		
Liberal Democrats hold		Swing		

Harrietsham and Lenham
Party	Candidate	Votes	%	±%
Conservative	John Barned	1,451	46.4	+5.8
Independent	Janetta Sams	1,394	44.6	−1.2
Labour	Gill Annan	280	9.0	+9.0
Majority		57	1.8	
Turnout		3,125		
Conservative hold		Swing		

Headcorn
Party	Candidate	Votes	%	±%
Conservative	Jenny Gibson	1,922	67.3	+0.6
Liberal Democrats	Geoffrey Samme	395	13.8	+13.8
Green	Penny Kemp	292	10.2	−23.1
Labour	Christine Edwards-Daem	245	8.6	+8.6
Majority		1,527	53.5	+20.1
Turnout		2,854		
Conservative hold		Swing		

Heath
Party	Candidate	Votes	%	±%
Liberal Democrats	Jenni Sharp	1,114	41.2	−4.2
Conservative	Nick de Wiggondene	1,035	38.3	−3.5
Labour	Wendy Hollands	296	10.9	+4.2
Independent	Carol Vizzard	172	6.4	+6.4
Green	Hannah Patton	87	3.2	−2.9
Majority		79	2.9	−0.7
Turnout		2,704		
Liberal Democrats hold		Swing		

High Street
Party	Candidate	Votes	%	±%
Liberal Democrats	Clive English	1,793	51.5	+7.6
Conservative	Paul Butcher	1,085	31.2	−5.1
Labour	Richard Coates	314	9.0	+0.0
UKIP	Frank Stanford	181	5.2	−0.3
Green	Wendy Lewis	110	3.2	−2.1
Majority		708	20.3	+12.7
Turnout		3,483		
Liberal Democrats hold		Swing		

Marden and Yalding
Party	Candidate	Votes	%	±%
Conservative	Rodd Nelson-Gracie	2,395	58.3	−14.6
Liberal Democrats	Carol Jacques	1,215	29.6	+14.1
Labour	Edith Davis	335	8.2	−3.4
Green	James Shalice	164	4.0	+4.0
Majority		1,180	28.7	−28.7
Turnout		4,109		
Conservative hold		Swing		

North
Party	Candidate	Votes	%	±%
Liberal Democrats	Tony Harwood	1,978	52.1	−7.3
Conservative	Jeff Tree	1,225	32.2	−0.2
Labour	Sally Wilcox	299	7.9	+7.9
UKIP	Charles Elliott	194	5.1	+5.1
Green	Derek Eagle	104	2.7	−5.6
Majority		753	19.8	−7.2
Turnout		3,800		
Liberal Democrats hold		Swing		

Park Wood
Party	Candidate	Votes	%	±%
Conservative	David Burton	790	39.8	+8.6
Liberal Democrats	Daniel Moriarty	715	36.0	−18.1
Labour	Mick Beckwith	356	17.9	+3.1
Independent	Stella Stevens	77	3.9	+3.9
Green	Joan Langrick	48	2.4	+2.4
Majority		75	3.8	
Turnout		1,986		
Conservative gain from Liberal Democrats		Swing		

Shepway North
Party	Candidate	Votes	%	±%
Conservative	Mike Yates	1,651	45.0	−15.6
Liberal Democrats	Joseph Mullen	851	23.2	+11.0
Labour	Geoff Harvey	754	20.6	−0.2
National Front	Gary Butler	146	4.0	+4.0
Green	Ainsley Francis	133	3.6	−3.7
Independent	Jon Hicks	132	3.6	−2.7
Majority		800	21.8	−18.0
Turnout		3,667		
Conservative hold		Swing		

Shepway South
Party	Candidate	Votes	%	±%
Conservative	Adrian Brindle	928	39.1	−12.8
Liberal Democrats	Ken Stevens	649	27.3	+11.2
Labour	Peter Edwards-Daem	632	26.6	−5.4
Independent	Sheena Williams	167	7.0	+7.0
Majority		279	11.7	−8.2
Turnout		2,376		
Conservative gain from Independent		Swing		

South
Party	Candidate	Votes	%	±%
Liberal Democrats	Derek Mortimer	2,062	47.0	−1.2
Conservative	Alan Chell	1,895	43.2	−4.4
Labour	John Morgan	291	6.6	+2.4
Green	Daniel Broad	141	3.2	+3.2
Majority		167	3.8	+3.1
Turnout		4,389		
Liberal Democrats gain from Conservative		Swing		

Staplehurst
Party	Candidate	Votes	%	±%
Conservative	Eric Hotson	1,906	59.7	−10.4
Liberal Democrats	Steven Williams	1,082	33.9	+17.1
Green	Ian McDonald	202	6.3	+6.3
Majority		824	25.8	−27.5
Turnout		3,190		
Conservative hold		Swing		
