= 2024 Maidstone Borough Council election =

Local election in Maidstone, England

← 2023	2 May 2024	2028 →

All 49 seats to Maidstone Borough Council 25 seats needed for a majority

	First party	Second party	Third party
Leader	David Burton	Clive English	Stuart Jeffery
Party	Conservative	Liberal Democrats	Green
Last election	24 seats, 32.7%	12 seats, 22.9%	3 seats, 16.8%
Seats before	25	12	3
Seats won	13	12	10
Seat change	▼12	Steady	▲7
Popular vote	26,353	16,639	18,470
Percentage	31.9%	20.1%	22.3%
Swing	▼0.8%	▼2.8%	▲5.5%
	Fourth party	Fifth party	Sixth party
Leader	Maureen Cleator	(Note: Of the nine independent councillors prior to the election, three sat in a group with the Greens as the 'Green Independent Alliance' and the other six were unaffiliated.)	Paul Harper
Party	Labour	Independent	Fant and Oakwood Independents
Last election	6 seats, 15.6%	10 seats, 11.3%	n/a
Seats before	4	9	2
Seats won	6	6	2
Seat change	▲2	▼3	▲2
Popular vote	10,415	5,582	2,434
Percentage	12.6%	6.8%	2.9%
Swing	▼3.0%	▼4.5%	n/a
- Winner of each seat at the 2024 Maidstone Borough Council election
Council control before election
David Burton
Conservative
No overall control
Council control after election
Stuart Jeffrey
Green
No overall control

The 2024 Maidstone Borough Council election took place on Thursday 2 May 2024, alongside the other local elections in the United Kingdom being held on the same day. All 49 members of Maidstone Borough Council in Kent were elected following boundary changes.

The council remained under no overall control. The Conservative minority administration which had been running the council prior to the election was replaced by a coalition of the Liberal Democrats, Greens and some of the independent councillors, led by Green councillor Stuart Jeffery.

== Overview ==
Prior to the election, the council was under no overall control, being run by a Conservative minority administration with informal support from some of the independent councillors. The leader of the council before the election was Conservative councillor David Burton, who had held the post since 2021. He did not stand for re-election.

Following the election the council remained under no overall control. The Conservatives were still the largest party, but with a significantly reduced share of the seats. A coalition of the Liberal Democrats, Greens and four of the independent councillors subsequently formed to run the council, led by Green councillor Stuart Jeffery. He was formally appointed as leader of the council at the subsequent annual council meeting on 18 May 2024.

== Boundary changes ==
Maidstone usually elects its councillors in thirds, on a 4-year cycle. However, following boundary changes, all councillors will be elected to the new wards. The change reduces the number of councillors by 6.

Old wards	No. of seats	New wards	No. of seats
Allington	3	Allington and Bridge	2
Barming	1	Barming Heath and Teston	2
Bearsted	3	Bearsted and Downswood	3
Boughton Monchelsea and Chart Sutton	1	Boughton Monchelsea and Chart Sutton	1
Boxley	3	Boxley Downs	2
Bridge	2	Coxheath and Farleigh	2
Coxheath and Hunton	3	Fant and Oakwood	3
Detling and Thurnham	1	Grove Green and Vinters Park	3
Downswood and Otham	1	Harrietsham, Lenham and North Downs	3
East	3	Headcorn and Sutton Valence	2
Fant	3	High Street	3
Harrietsham and Lenham	2	Leeds and Langley	2
Headcorn	2	Loose and Linton	2
Heath	2	Marden and Yalding	3
High Street	3	Palace Wood	2
Leeds	1	Park Wood and Mangravet	2
Loose	1	Penenden Heath	3
Marden and Yalding	3	Ringlestone	1
North	3	Senacre	1
North Downs	1	Shepway	3
Park Wood	2	Staplehurst	2
Shepway North	3	Tovil	2
Shepway North	3		
Shepway South	2		
South	3		
Staplehurst	2		
Sutton Valence and Langley	1		

== Previous council composition ==
After 2023 election		Before 2024 election		After 2024 election	
Party	Seats	Party	Seats	Party	Seats
Conservative	24	Conservative	25	Conservative	13
Liberal Democrats	12	Liberal Democrats	12	Liberal Democrats	12
Labour	6	Labour	4	Labour	6
Green	3	Green	3	Green	10
Fant & Oakwood Independents	Didn't exist	Fant & Oakwood Independents	2	Fant & Oakwood Independents	2
Independent	10	Independent	9	Independent	6

Changes:

- May 2023: Michelle Hastie (independent) joins Conservatives
- July 2023: Patrick Coates and Paul Harper leave Labour to sit as independents
- November 2023: Fant & Oakwood Independents formed - Patrick Coates and Paul Harper (both independents) join party

== Results ==
2024 Maidstone Borough Council election
Party	Candidates	Seats	Gains	Losses	Net gain/loss	Seats %	Votes %	Votes	+/−
Conservative	49	13	0	0	▼12	26.5	31.9	26,353	–0.8
Liberal Democrats	29	12	0	0	Steady	24.5	20.1	16,639	–2.8
Green	35	10	0	0	▲7	20.4	22.3	18,470	+5.5
Independent	10	8	0	0	▼3	16.3	9.7	8,016	–1.6
Labour	28	6	0	0	▲2	15.6	12.6	10,415	–3.0
Reform UK	8	0	0	0	Steady	0.0	2.7	2,264	+2.3
British Democrats	1	0	0	0	Steady	0.0	0.5	452	N/A
Heritage	1	0	0	0	Steady	0.0	0.1	107	–0.2

== Ward results ==
An asterisk denotes an incumbent councillor seeking re-election.

=== Allington and Bridge ===
Allington and Bridge (2 seats)
Party	Candidate	Votes	%	±%
Green	Stuart Jeffery*	914	60.0	
Green	Rachel Rodwell	822	54.0	
Conservative	Mitu Chowdhury	385	25.3	
Conservative	Rita Gintautaite	263	17.3	
Liberal Democrats	Michelle Englar	257	16.9	
Labour	Marianna Poliszczuk	203	13.3	
Liberal Democrats	Benjamin Webster-Whiting	202	13.3	
Turnout		1,659		
Green win (new seat)				
Green win (new seat)				

=== Barming Heath and Teston ===
Barming Heath and Teston (2 seats)
Party	Candidate	Votes	%	±%
Independent	Fay Gooch*	765	37.8	
Green	Allison Sweetman	712	35.2	
Liberal Democrats	Chris Passmore	707	34.9	
Green	Keira Stuart Smith	618	30.5	
Liberal Democrats	Bryan Vizzard	409	20.2	
Conservative	Reiss Cordrey	376	18.6	
Labour	Mary Shaw	280	13.8	
Conservative	Arek Zurawinski	182	9.0	
Turnout		2,213		
Independent win (new seat)				
Green win (new seat)				

=== Bearsted and Downswood ===
Bearsted and Downswood (3 seats)
Party	Candidate	Votes	%	±%
Conservative	Val Springett*	1,200	48.6	
Conservative	Denis Spooner*	1,021	41.3	
Green	Ciaran Oliver	1,013	41.0	
Conservative	Paul Cooper*	984	39.8	
Green	Lee Garrett	796	32.2	
Green	Edward Wallace	659	26.7	
Reform UK	David Cockerham	481	19.5	
Independent	Gordon Newton*	409	16.6	
Liberal Democrats	Ian Chittenden	398	16.1	
Labour	Theresa Lyons	343	13.9	
Heritage	Sean Turner	107	4.3	
Turnout		2,848		
Conservative win (new seat)				
Conservative win (new seat)				
Green win (new seat)				

=== Boughton Monchelsea and Chart Sutton ===
Boughton Monchelsea and Chart Sutton
Party	Candidate	Votes	%	±%
Independent	Anne Dawes	599	63.1	+10.3
Conservative	George Burr	216	22.8	–5.2
Labour	Peter Oliver	134	14.1	+9.7
Turnout		958		
Independent hold		Swing	▲7.8	

=== Boxley Downs ===
Boxley Downs (2 seats)
Party	Candidate	Votes	%	±%
Independent	Vanessa Jones*	1,026	65.0	
Green	Stephen Thompson*	810	51.3	
Conservative	Heidi Bryant*	414	26.2	
Conservative	Stephen Banks	379	24.0	
Labour	Michael Beckwith	279	17.7	
Reform UK	Mike Wardle	250	15.8	
Turnout		1,838		
Independent win (new seat)				
Green win (new seat)				

=== Coxheath and Farleigh ===
Coxheath and Farleigh (2 seats)
Party	Candidate	Votes	%	±%
Green	Claire Kehily	781	53.2	
Conservative	Lottie Parfitt-Reid*	666	45.3	
Conservative	John Wilson	581	39.6	
Green	Caroline Richer	547	37.2	
Labour	John Randall	192	13.1	
Liberal Democrats	Alan Cocks	171	11.6	
Turnout		1,717		
Green win (new seat)				
Conservative win (new seat)				

=== Fant and Oakwood ===
Fant and Oakwood (3 seats)
Party	Candidate	Votes	%	±%
Fant and Oakwood Independents	Paul Harper*	1,285	59.5	
Fant and Oakwood Independents	Patrick Coates*	1,149	53.2	
Green	Kimberley Milham	909	42.1	
Labour	Valerie Jacobs	447	20.7	
Labour	Dennis Luchmun	410	19.0	
Liberal Democrats	Rojo Kurien	384	17.8	
Labour	Margaret Rose*	379	17.5	
Liberal Democrats	Lee Blake	316	14.6	
Liberal Democrats	Lorraine Humm	290	13.4	
Conservative	Will Dinley	278	12.9	
Reform UK	Susan Delamere	247	11.4	
Conservative	Ramakrishna Peeta	202	9.3	
Conservative	Mudiwa Musindo	186	8.6	
Turnout		2,472		
Independent win (new seat)				
Independent win (new seat)				
Green win (new seat)				

Patrick Coates and Paul Harper were originally elected as Labour Party candidates, but stood under the descriptions of "Fant and Oakwood Independents" at this election.

=== Grove Green and Vinters Park ===
Grove Green and Vinters Park (3 seats)
Party	Candidate	Votes	%	±%
Liberal Democrats	Rob Field	939	40.8	
Liberal Democrats	Mark Naghi	897	39.0	
Conservative	Ronald Burke	834	36.3	
Conservative	Michelle Hastie*	830	36.1	
Independent	Martin Cox*	666	29.0	
Liberal Democrats	Jeeva Sampangi	661	28.7	
Conservative	Jaison Musindo	654	28.4	
Green	Steven Cheeseman	450	19.6	
Labour	Mark Tickner	343	14.9	
Green	Susan Parr	331	14.4	
Green	Anna Winterbottom	294	12.8	
Turnout		2,618		
Liberal Democrats win (new seat)				
Liberal Democrats win (new seat)				
Conservative win (new seat)				

Michelle Hastie was originally elected as an Liberal Democrat.

=== Harrietsham, Lenham and North Downs ===
Harrietsham, Lenham and North Downs (3 seats)
Party	Candidate	Votes	%	±%
Independent	Janetta Sams*	1,515	79.8	
Independent	Tom Sams*	1,455	76.7	
Independent	Kathy Cox	923	48.6	
Conservative	Julie-Anne Clancy	435	22.9	
Conservative	Emily Hudson	396	20.9	
Labour	Ryan Slaughter	364	19.2	
Reform UK	Ian Stevens	305	16.1	
Conservative	Onyekachukwu Chukwuma	301	15.9	
Turnout		2,251		
Independent win (new seat)				
Independent win (new seat)				
Independent win (new seat)				

=== Headcorn and Sutton Valence ===
Headcorn and Sutton Valence (2 seats)
Party	Candidate	Votes	%	±%
Conservative	Martin Round*	975	50.1	
Conservative	Ziggy Trzebinski*	903	46.4	
Green	Derek Eagle*	820	42.1	
Green	Thomas Dawber	725	37.3	
Labour	Henry Morgan	280	14.4	
Liberal Democrats	Martin Richards	189	9.7	
Turnout		2,177		
Conservative win (new seat)				
Conservative win (new seat)				

=== High Street ===
High Street (3 seats)
Party	Candidate	Votes	%	±%
Liberal Democrats	Clive English*	742	46.8	
Liberal Democrats	Dinesh Khadka*	654	41.3	
Green	Donna Greenan	514	32.4	
Green	Saf Buxy	513	32.4	
Liberal Democrats	Ashleigh Kimmance*	444	28.0	
Labour	David Collier	401	25.3	
Green	Farris Willson	358	22.6	
Independent	Denise Joy*	341	21.5	
Conservative	Oliver Bradshaw	314	19.8	
Conservative	Alan Chell	270	17.0	
Conservative	Dylan Jeffrey	202	12.7	
Turnout		1,809		
Liberal Democrats hold				
Liberal Democrats hold				
Green gain from Independent				

=== Leeds and Langley ===
Leeds and Langley (2 seats)
Party	Candidate	Votes	%	±%
Conservative	Gill Fort*	600	55.3	
Conservative	Gary Cooke*	559	51.5	
Labour	Joan Langrick	310	28.6	
Green	Simon Easton	275	25.4	
Green	Matthew White	216	19.9	
Reform UK	Maxwell Harrison	209	19.3	
Turnout		1,259		
Conservative win (new seat)				
Conservative win (new seat)				

=== Loose and Linton ===
Loose and Linton (2 seats)
Party	Candidate	Votes	%	±%
Liberal Democrats	Brian Clark*	1,307	70.0	
Liberal Democrats	Simon Wales	931	49.9	
Conservative	Kenneth Amakye	423	22.7	
Conservative	James Reid*	326	17.5	
Reform UK	Bryan Hillman	265	14.2	
Green	Nicola Dawber	215	11.5	
Labour	Alan le Grys	149	8.0	
Green	Matthew Fraser	119	6.4	
Turnout		2,099		
Liberal Democrats win (new seat)				
Liberal Democrats win (new seat)				

=== Marden and Yalding ===
Marden and Yalding (3 seats)
Party	Candidate	Votes	%	±%
Conservative	Claudine Russell*	1,123	47.6	
Green	Michael Summersgill	1,120	47.5	
Green	Grace Couch	1,089	46.2	
Conservative	Annabelle Blackmore*	1,043	44.2	
Conservative	Tristan Russell	953	40.4	
Green	Kelly Rigden	772	32.7	
Labour	Maria Kelly	389	16.5	
Reform UK	Teresa Seamer	298	12.6	
Liberal Democrats	William Wilby	287	12.2	
Turnout		2,704		
Conservative hold				
Green gain from Conservative				
Green gain from Conservative				

=== Palace Wood ===
Palace Wood (2 seats)
Party	Candidate	Votes	%	±%
Conservative	Stan Forecast*	1,066	50.5	
Conservative	Tom Cannon*	816	38.6	
Liberal Democrats	Cynthia Robertson*	724	34.3	
Liberal Democrats	Diana Lewins	704	33.3	
Green	Ian McDonald	403	19.1	
Green	Stephen Muggeridge	286	13.5	
Labour	Wendy Hollands	225	10.7	
Turnout		2,313		
Conservative win (new seat)				
Conservative win (new seat)				

=== Park Wood and Mangravet ===
Park Wood and Mangravet (2 seats)
Party	Candidate	Votes	%	±%
Labour	Hilary Jenkins-Baldock	512	69.0	
Labour	Daniel Wilkinson*	492	66.3	
Conservative	Joyce Gadd	241	32.5	
Conservative	Lewis McKenna*	240	32.3	
Turnout		841		
Labour win (new seat)				
Labour win (new seat)				

=== Penenden Heath ===
Penenden Heath (3 seats)
Party	Candidate	Votes	%	±%
Liberal Democrats	Tony Harwood*	1,155	61.5	
Liberal Democrats	Richard Conyard*	1,086	57.9	
Liberal Democrats	David Naghi*	1,034	55.1	
Conservative	Derek Nicholson	402	21.4	
Conservative	Jeff Tree	396	21.1	
Conservative	Andrew Bradford	370	19.7	
Labour	Rachel Slaughter	356	19.0	
Green	Phoebe Frewer	353	18.8	
Green	Andrew Reilly	246	13.1	
Green	Daniel Thompson	233	12.4	
Turnout		2,098		
Liberal Democrats win (new seat)				
Liberal Democrats win (new seat)				
Liberal Democrats win (new seat)				

=== Ringlestone ===
Ringlestone
Party	Candidate	Votes	%	±%
Liberal Democrats	Mike Thompson*	325	52.0	
Conservative	Scott Hahnefeld	126	20.2	
Labour	Stella Randall	116	18.6	
Green	Gareth Henry	58	9.3	
Turnout		630		
Liberal Democrats win (new seat)				

=== Senacre ===
Senacre
Party	Candidate	Votes	%	±%
Labour	Malcolm McKay	257	51.8	
Conservative	Patrik Garten*	239	48.2	
Turnout		509		
Labour win (new seat)				

=== Shepway ===
Shepway (3 seats)
Party	Candidate	Votes	%	±%
Labour	Joanna Wilkinson*	747	42.5	
Labour	Maureen Cleator*	728	41.4	
Labour	Sarah Barwick	725	41.2	
Conservative	Christopher Garland	665	37.8	
Conservative	Alan Bartlett*	643	36.6	
Conservative	Louise Bartlett	637	36.2	
British Democrats	Lawrence Rustem	452	25.7	
Liberal Democrats	Geoffrey Samme	360	20.5	
Independent	Gary Butler	317	18.0	
Turnout		2,031		
Labour win (new seat)				
Labour win (new seat)				
Labour win (new seat)				

=== Staplehurst ===
Staplehurst (2 seats)
Party	Candidate	Votes	%	±%
Conservative	Paddy Riordan*	967	57.3	
Conservative	John Perry*	764	45.3	
Labour	Rory Silkin	598	35.4	
Labour	Julie Skinner	511	30.3	
Liberal Democrats	Thomas Burnham	296	17.5	
Green	Stewart Lane	239	14.2	
Turnout		1,848		
Conservative hold				
Conservative hold				

=== Tovil ===
Tovil (2 seats)
Party	Candidate	Votes	%	±%
Liberal Democrats	Paul Wilby*	393	43.9	
Liberal Democrats	Joe Higson	377	42.1	
Labour	Ian Cleator	245	27.4	
Reform UK	Paul Thomas	209	23.3	
Conservative	Rebecca Bruneau	177	19.8	
Green	Simon Milham	137	15.3	
Conservative	Benjamin Reid	130	14.5	
Green	Rosemary Riepma	123	13.7	
Turnout		1,041		
Liberal Democrats win (new seat)				
Liberal Democrats win (new seat)				

== By-elections ==
=== Harrietsham, Lenham & North Downs ===
Harrietsham, Lenham & North Downs by-election: 2 October 2025 (3 seats)
Party	Candidate	Votes	%	±%
Reform UK	Chris Houlihan	1,228	54.2	+38.1
Reform UK	Steve Povey	1,226	54.1	N/A
Reform UK	Mariela Nedelcheva	1,153	50.9	N/A
Green	Callum Sweetman	459	20.2	N/A
Green	James Snyder	452	19.9	N/A
Green	Reshmi Kalam	430	19.0	N/A
Conservative	Isobelle Horne	342	15.1	–7.8
Conservative	Darcy Rotherham	285	12.6	–8.3
Liberal Democrats	Jennifer Horwood	236	10.4	N/A
Conservative	Onyehachukwu Chukwuma	234	10.3	–5.6
Liberal Democrats	Sam Burrows	156	6.9	N/A
Liberal Democrats	Andrew Cockersole	123	5.4	N/A
Heritage	Sean Turner	97	4.3	N/A
Independent	Gary Butler	74	3.3	N/A
Independent	Sam Lawrence-Rose	69	3.0	N/A
Turnout		2,267		
Reform UK gain from Independent				
Reform UK gain from Independent				
Reform UK gain from Independent				
