= 2012 Maidstone Borough Council election =

2012 UK local government election

Results of the 2012 Maidstone District Council election

The 2012 Maidstone Borough Council elections took place on Thursday 3 May 2012 to elect members of Maidstone Borough Council in Kent, England. One third of the council (19 seats) were scheduled for election, whilst an additional vacancy caused by the resignation of a sitting councillor was also filled in Heath ward, meaning a total of 20 of the borough's 55 seats were elected.

== Election result ==
Maidstone local election result 2012
Party	Seats	Gains	Losses	Net gain/loss	Seats %	Votes %	Votes	+/−
Conservative	10						9,916	
Labour	1						4,269	
Liberal Democrats	6						7,446	
Green	0						1,865	
Independent	3						2,123	
UKIP	0						565	
National Front	0						97	

== Ward results ==
Allington
Party	Candidate	Votes	%	±%
Conservative	Barry Ginley	613		
Labour	Wendy Hollands	266		
Liberal Democrats	Malcolm Robertson	1146		
Majority				
Turnout			36%	

Barming
Party	Candidate	Votes	%	±%
Conservative	Sue Black	182		
Independent	Fay Gooch	722		
Majority				
Turnout			46%	

Bearsted
Party	Candidate	Votes	%	±%
Conservative	Richard Ash	1340		
Labour	Steve Gibson	396		
Green	Ciaran Oliver	204		
Liberal Democrats	Geoffrey Samme	154		
Majority				
Turnout			31%	

Boughton Monchelsea and Chart Sutton
Party	Candidate	Votes	%	±%
Labour	Gill Annan	39		
Conservative	Andrew Le Hegarat	192		
Independent	Steve Munford	707		
Majority				
Turnout			46%	

Boxley
Party	Candidate	Votes	%	±%
Labour	Michael Beckwith	357		
Conservative	Wendy Hinder	1167		
Green	Andrew Waldie	186		
Majority				
Turnout			26%	

Bridge
Party	Candidate	Votes	%	±%
Liberal Democrats	Rob Field	407		
Labour	Bruce Heald	200		
Green	Robin Kinrade	141		
Conservative	James Ross	443		
Majority				
Turnout			26%	

Coxheath and Hunton
Party	Candidate	Votes	%	±%
Green	Denise Hay	114		
Liberal Democrats	Martin Rabicano	638		
Labour	Stella Randall	221		
Conservative	John Wilson	794		
UKIP	Keith Woollven	222		
Majority				
Turnout			34%	

East
Party	Candidate	Votes	%	±%
Liberal Democrats	Martin Cox	1060		
Conservative	Tony Dennison	623		
Green	Hannah Patton	312		
Majority				
Turnout			30%	

Fant
Party	Candidate	Votes	%	±%
Labour	Paul Harper	548		
Green	Stuart Jeffrey	442		
Conservative	Stephen Paine	610		
Liberal Democrats	Irene Shepherd	311		
Majority				
Turnout			28%	

Headcorn
Party	Candidate	Votes	%	±%
Green	Penny Kemp			
Conservative	Richard Thick			
Majority				
Turnout				

Heath (2)
Party	Candidate	Votes	%	±%
Labour	Patrick Coates	217		
Labour	Richard Coates	217		
Conservative	Scott Hahnefeld	349		
Conservative	Brian Moss	428		
Liberal Democrats	Mark Naghi	369		
Green	James Shalice	120		
Liberal Democrats	Bryan Vizzard	499		
Turnout			26%	

High Street
Party	Candidate	Votes	%	±%
Conservative	Paul Butcher	374		
Liberal Democrats	Denise Joy	649		
Green	Wendy Lewis	113		
Labour	Marianna Poliszczuk	233		
UKIP	John Stanford	176		
Majority				
Turnout			23%	

Marden and Yalding
Party	Candidate	Votes	%	±%
Liberal Democrats	Ralph Austin			
Labour	Edith Davis			
Green	Ian McDonald			
Conservative	Steve McLoughlin			
Majority				
Turnout				

North Downs
Party	Candidate	Votes	%	±%
Labour	Audrey Gardner	84		
Green	Sarah Goodwin	66		
Conservative	Daphne Parvin	442		
Independent	Carol Vizzard	115		
Majority				
Turnout			36%	

North
Party	Candidate	Votes	%	±%
Labour	Keith Adkinson	206		
UKIP	Charles Elliott	167		
Liberal Democrats	Jenni Paterson	907		
Conservative	Jeff Tree	381		
Majority				
Turnout			27%	

Park Wood
Party	Candidate	Votes	%	±%
Conservative	Gary Cooke	214		
Labour	Debbie Fernandez	276		
Independent	Daniel Moriarty	319		
Majority				
Turnout			18%	

Shepway North
Party	Candidate	Votes	%	±%
Conservative	Christopher Garland	742	46.0	
Labour	Jim Grogan	591	37.0	
Green	Stephen Muggeridge	167	10.0	
National Front	Gary Butler	97	6.0	
Majority		151		
Turnout		1,597		

Shepway South
Party	Candidate	Votes	%	±%
Conservative	Bob Hinder	265		
Independent	Geoff Licence	260		
Labour	Malcolm McKay	418		
Majority				
Turnout			21%	

South
Party	Candidate	Votes	%	±%
Liberal Democrats	Ian Chittenden	1306		
Conservative	Vianne Gibbons	757		
Majority				
Turnout			32%	
