= GKD Legend =

GKD Legend/Legend six
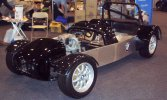

Overview
- Manufacturer: GKD Sports Cars
- Production: 2008–present
- Assembly: Kent, England
- Designer: Peter Lathrope

Body and chassis
- Class: Roadster
- Body style: Open two-seater
- Layout: FR (Front-engine / RWD)
- Platform: Fabricated chassis and double wishbone suspension using BMW E36/E46 donnor items

Powertrain
- Engine: BMW 4-cylinder engines/BMW straight-6
- Transmission: BMW

Dimensions
- Curb weight: 585 kg (1,290 lb)-620 kg (1,367 lb)

The GKD LEGEND is a light-weight performance sports car manufactured by British company GKD Sports Cars, based in Boughton Monchelsea, near Maidstone with workshops at Lenham. The LEGEND is available in component form, or fully built. It was the first seven inspired car on the market using BMW E36/46 running gear.

== History ==
The GKD LEGEND was a byproduct of the work to convert the GKD EVOLUTION to BMW donor parts. Creator Peter Lathrope saw a gap in the market for a BMW based seven and developed the LEGEND. After its first show preview at Exeter kit car show the press hailed the car as "the next big thing" in the kit car market as most of the Lotus Seven Style cars are still Ford Sierra based. After the success of the initial Legend GKD Sports Cars bridged the gap between the Legend and the Evolution by introducing a new variant known as the Legend six. This model is a slightly longer chassis to accommodate the BMW straight 6 engine and running gear but still keeping the classic 7 style.

== Car components ==
The car uses a donor pack from a BMW 3 Series. The donor pack includes differential, half-shafts, brakes, steering column and lower steering shaft and if required, engine and gearbox. The chassis comes with BMW engine mounts already welded to the chassis to ease fitment.

Kits start at around £2,995, with an estimated build price from £8,000 (as of late 2008).

- Price list

Fully built cars are also supplied to foreign markets, countering crash test requirements. Prices start at around £10,500, with the donor pack left to the customer to source. Or GKD can supply all the donor pack components to order.

The body shell is made from GRP fibreglass, with a bespoke chassis housing the engine and suspension.

== Example cars ==
The LEGEND can utilise most engines. The chart below indicates performance with a BMW E46 1.8 with different states of tune. Also including the Legend six with the E46 M3 engine and running gear

Performance of sample models
Trim	Weight	Power	Transmission	Estimated 0-60 mph
Road Car	595 kg (1,312 lb)	140 hp (100 kW)	5-Speed	4.8 sec
Road Car	595 kg (1,312 lb)	165 hp (123 kW)	5-Speed	4.5 sec
Road Car	595 kg (1,312 lb)	200 hp (150 kW)	5-Speed	3.8 sec
Race/track car	500 kg (1,102 lb)	200 hp (150 kW)	5-Speed	3.5 sec
Road/track car	650 kg (1,433 lb)	343 hp (256 kW)	6-Speed	3 sec
