= Ginetta G27 =

The Ginetta G27, G33, and G34 are a series of race and road cars from Ginetta Cars. Most were sold as kits, but some variants of the G33 and all G34s were sold fully built up, with type approval. The G34 was built in Sweden.

== Design ==
=== G27 ===
Ginetta G27
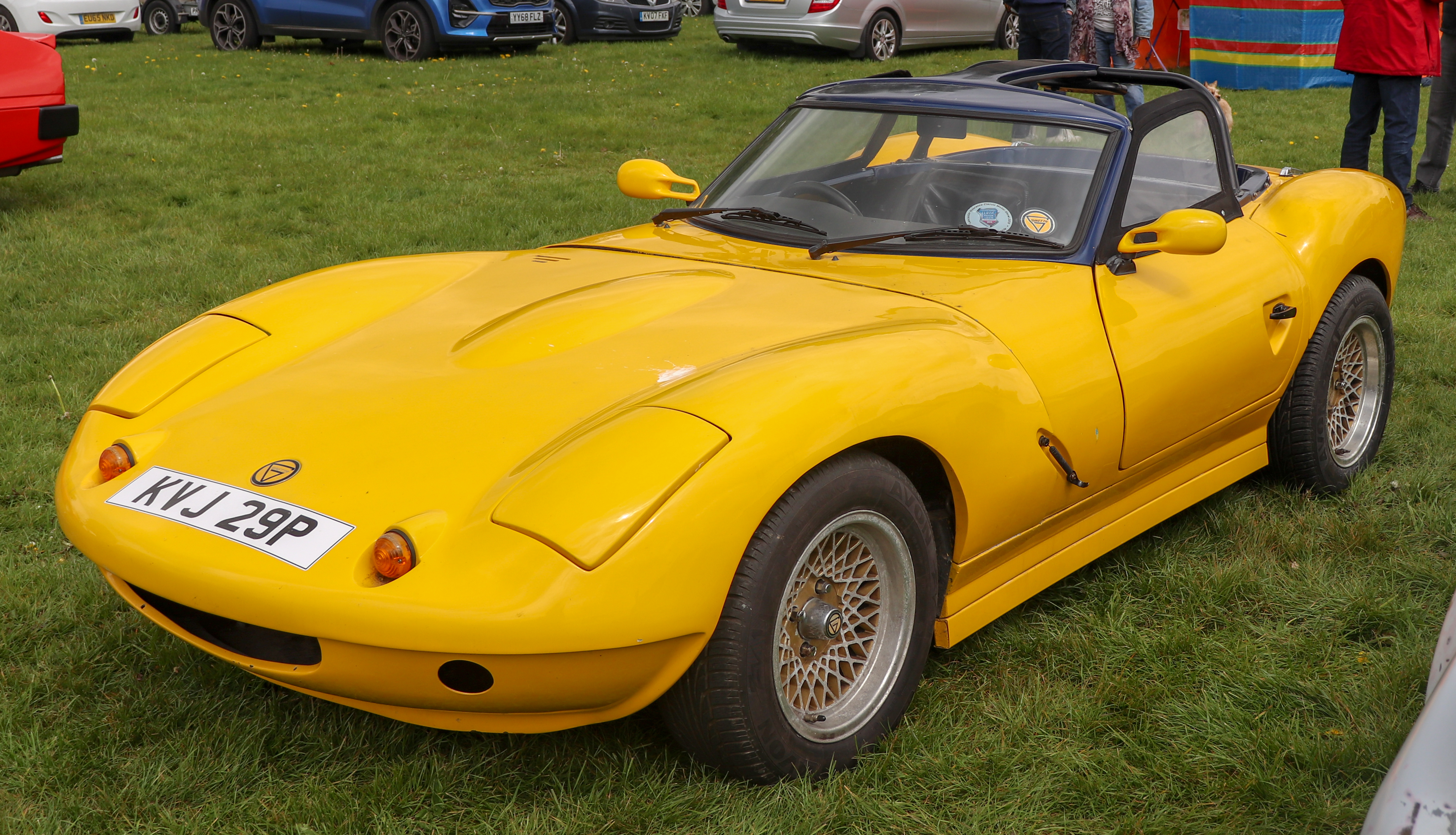

Overview
- Manufacturer: Ginetta
- Production: 1985–2005
- Designer: Mark Walklett

Body and chassis
- Body style: 2-door roadster
- Layout: Front-engine, rear-wheel drive

Powertrain
- Engine: Ford I4; Opel/Vauxhall I4; Rover V8
- Transmission: 4/5-speed Manual

Chronology
- Predecessor: Ginetta G4
- Successor: Ginetta G20; GKD Evolution

The G27, which was introduced in November 1985, was a two-seater sports car derived from the G4. Designed by Mark Walklett, it uses the front suspension from the Triumph Vitesse, a modified Jaguar independent rear suspension, and could be fitted with a wide range of engines up to the Rover V8. This design was then used for the G33's bodywork as well.

More than 200 examples were built, in four distinct series. The G27 was also simplified to become the G20 racing car, which first appeared in 2001. In February 2005, the rights to the G27, including the jigs, molds, and other parts necessary to build the car were sold to a company called GKD Sports Cars who started selling a redesigned version of the car as the GKD Evolution.

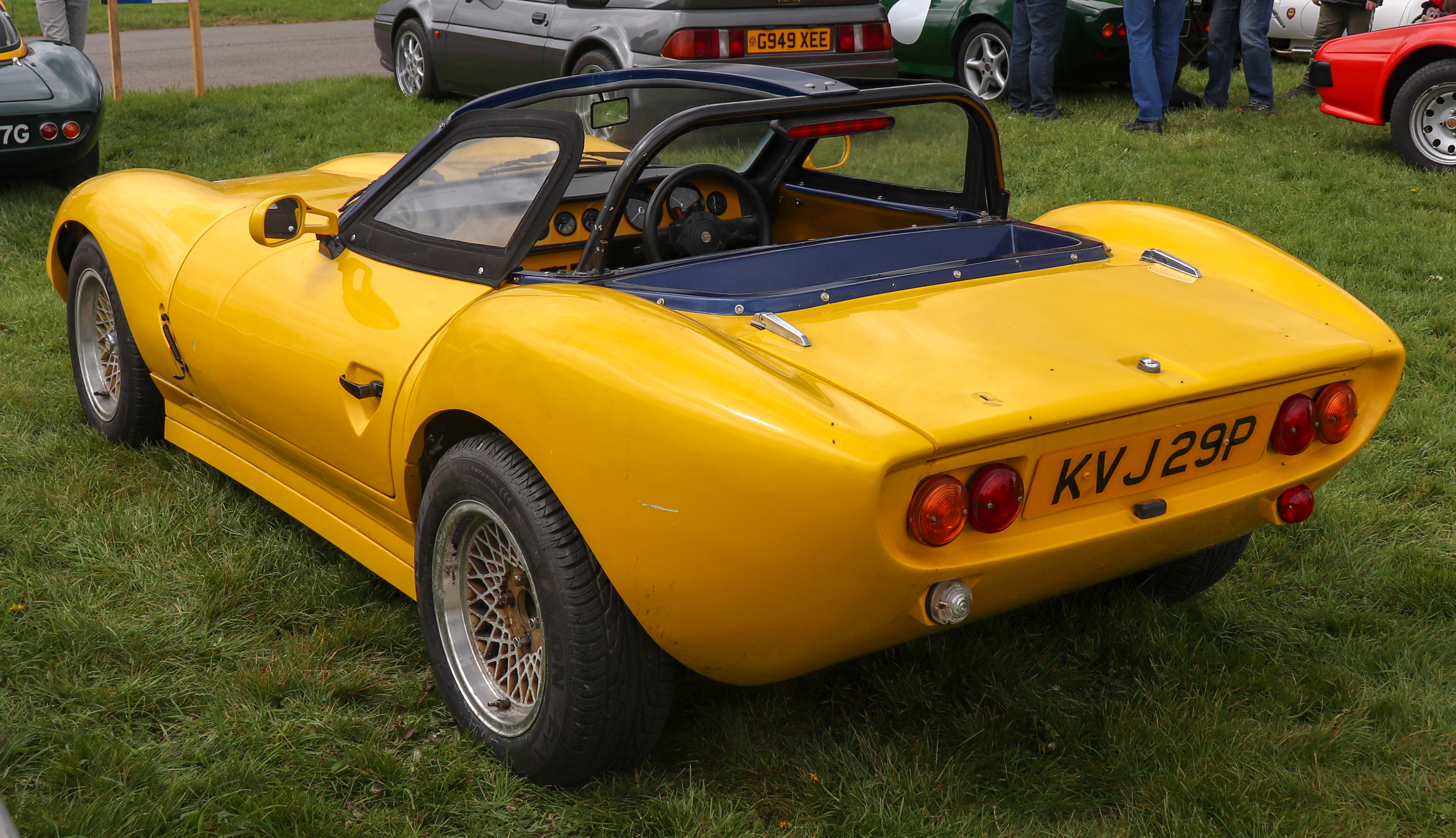
G27; rear view

=== G33 ===
The G33 speedster was introduced in 1990; it was typically equipped with a 200-horsepower (149 kW), 3.9 litre Rover V8 which made the car capable of a top speed of 145 mph (233 km/h) and a 0–60 mph (97 km/h) acceleration time of 5 seconds. Unlike the G27, the G33 was only available as a complete car – although they were officially delivered as kits, with the owner ostensibly expected to complete minor front suspension assembly so as to circumvent the need for type approval which Ginetta could not afford after the expense of the G32. In terms of appearance, the windshield, with its body-coloured frame and cut-off corners, was the main difference compared to the G27, while the overall appearance was smoothed off, with various creases and folds removed. The windscreen's corners were cut so as to provide easier access to the cabin. Under the body, the G33 used the suspension parts from the rear-wheel drive Ford Sierra Cosworth, rather than the mixed setup from the G27. The front setup is double wishbones and adjustable shocks, brakes are ABS-equipped discs all around. Betraying the car's competition origins was the inclusion of a brake bias adjuster, while power brakes were absent.

The G33 was used in competition in Sweden; lessons learned there led to a series of continuous revisions to the production G33s, including extra chassis bracing and revisions to the spring ratings. The rear bodywork was also revised several times during the production run, as well as other revisions which were necessary to a car which entered production long before it had been fully developed (and against Walklett's wishes), as acknowledged by Ginetta themselves.

Ginetta could also fit the G33 with other engines: in the Swedish market (and for other export markets), the G33 was fitted with the Sierra Cosworth's 2-litre YBG turbo four with a catalytic converter, developing 220 hp (162 kW) at 6,200 rpm and 290 N⋅m (214 lb⋅ft) at 3,500 rpm. Top speed was listed as circa 230 km/h (143 mph) and a 0–100 km/h (62 mph) acceleration time of 5.7 seconds. Ginetta ran into financial trouble in 1992 and production of the G33 ended in early 1994, after 90-100 examples had been built. One source states 96 examples were built, but 100 examples were required to obtain RAC homologation for production car racing, so this number was claimed by Ginetta. A longer wheelbase version called the G33 Series 2, available either with the Rover V8 or Ford's 1.8-litre, 16-valve Zeta engine, was built in small numbers beginning in late 1992. This model is also known as the G33 Club. The longer wheelbase meant that the cut-off windshield was no longer necessary. The molds and rights to the G33 were sold to Ginetta's Swedish importer, who developed them into the G34, with the proceeds being used to develop the G27. After the Swedish project failed, the molds and rights reverted to Ginetta in the UK.

A redesigned prototype with fixed headlights from the Mazda MX-3, Nissan 100NX taillights (mounted upside down), using the longer wheelbase and squared off windscreen of the G33 Club was also developed and was shown in 1994. Called the G33SC it remained a single prototype.

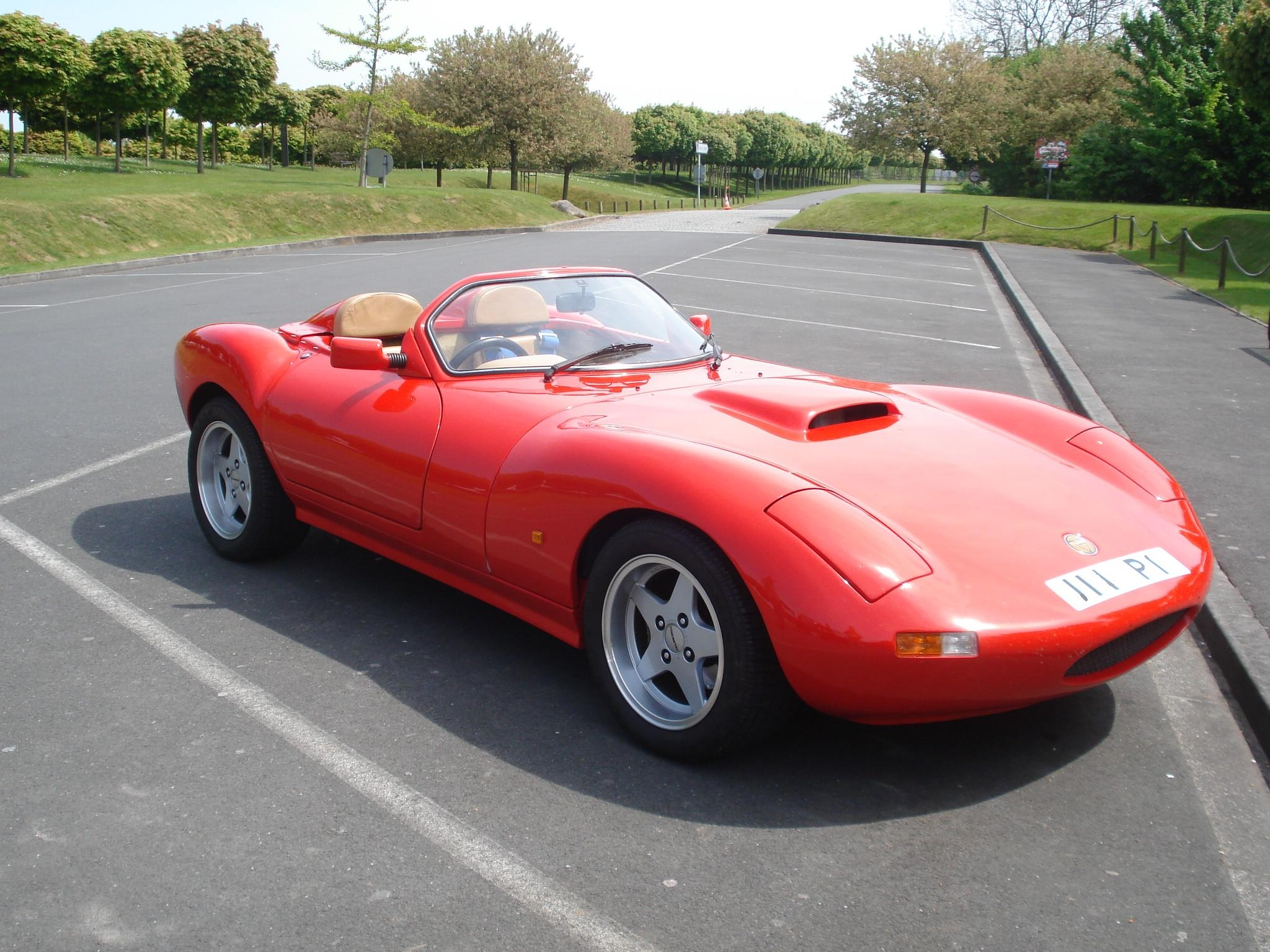
1992 Ginetta G33

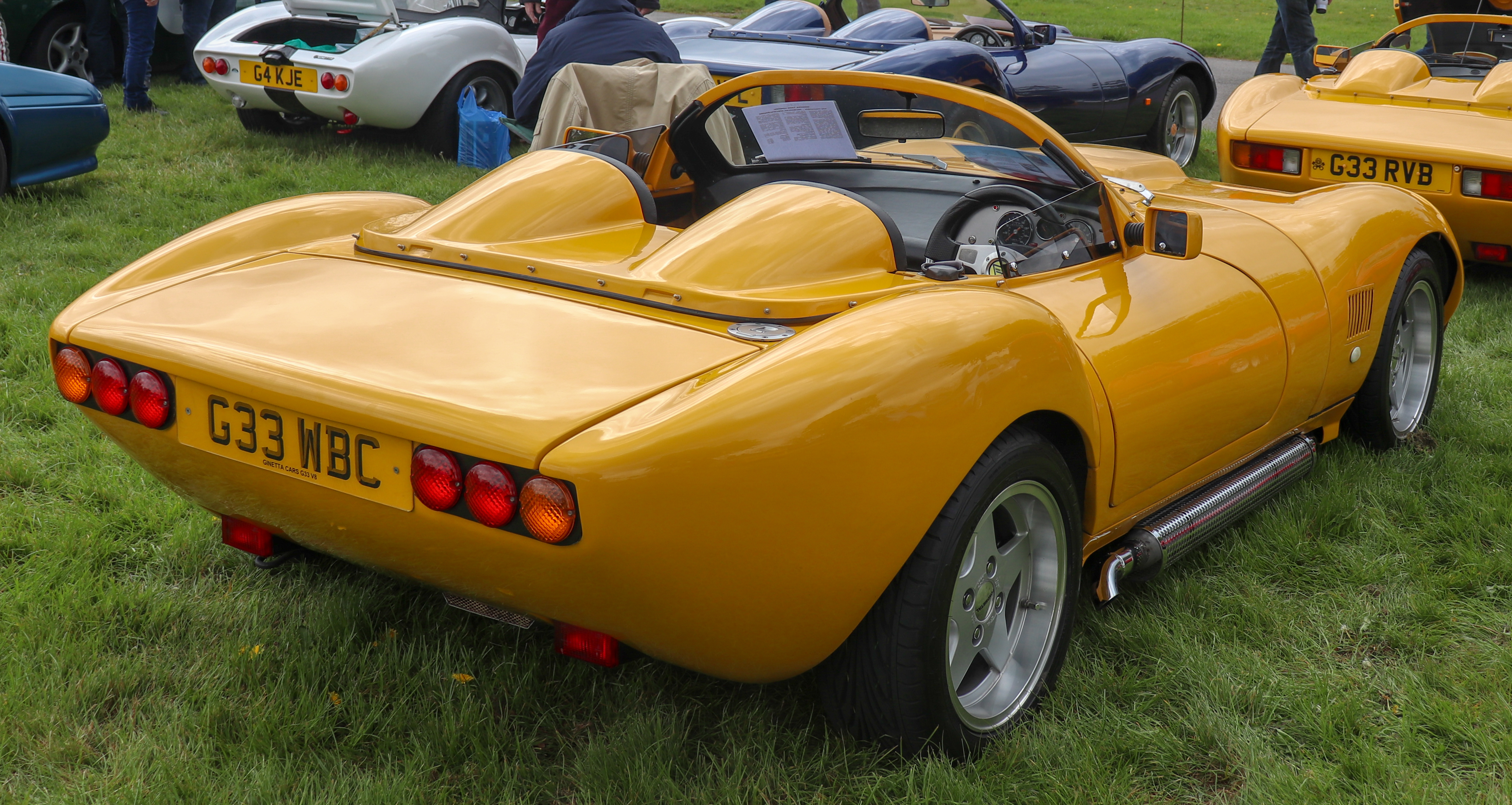
Rear view of 1992 G33

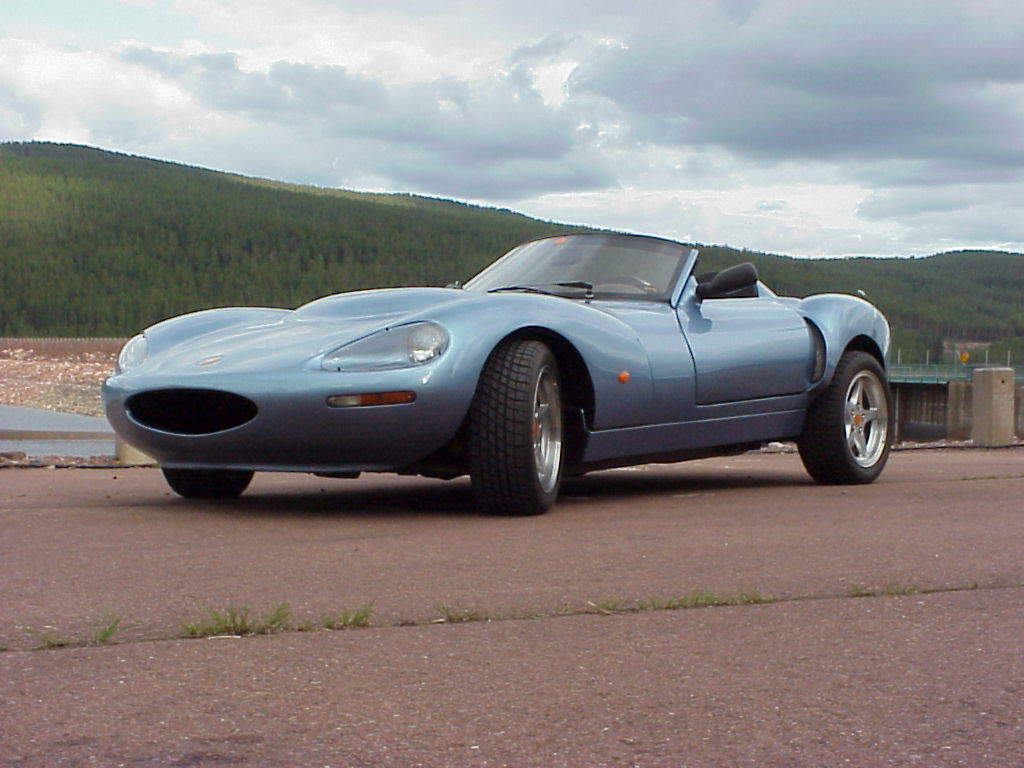
1997 Ginetta G34 (Swedish-built)

=== G34/G40 ===
In January 1993 the G34, a version with a turbocharged Volvo four-cylinder engine was presented, using some of the design cues from the stillborn G33SC, including the MX-3 headlamps. This was an attempt to break into the European market with a fully built and type approved car, as the kit market was very limited in Continental Europe. Ginetta's Swedish importer Ingemar Engström formed a company called Gin 1 Car AB, to produce this model, using Volvo engines and other parts, including the M90 five-speed manual transmission and the rear axle from the Volvo 960. The initial specifications included engines with either 165 or 190 PS (121 or 140 kW); the taller engine also required a sizable hump in the bonnet. Volvo, who typically does not supply parts to small companies, already had a relationship with Jösse Car who manufactured the Indigo sports car and provided significant assistance to the fledgling operation. Production finally began 1997 in Arvika but was moved to Älvdalen soon thereafter. The production cars received a 225 PS (165 kW) version of the Volvo engine. The project failed, however, with Swedish production coming to an end in the spring of 1998 after 21 cars had been built.

Production reverted to the United Kingdom, where the last few cars were built and sold as the G40 (no direct relation to the later G40 and its derivatives) to celebrate Ginetta's 40th anniversary.
