= Ginetta G10 =

The Ginetta G10, G11, and G10 RM are a series of race and road kit cars from Ginetta Cars.

== G10 ==
Ginetta G10
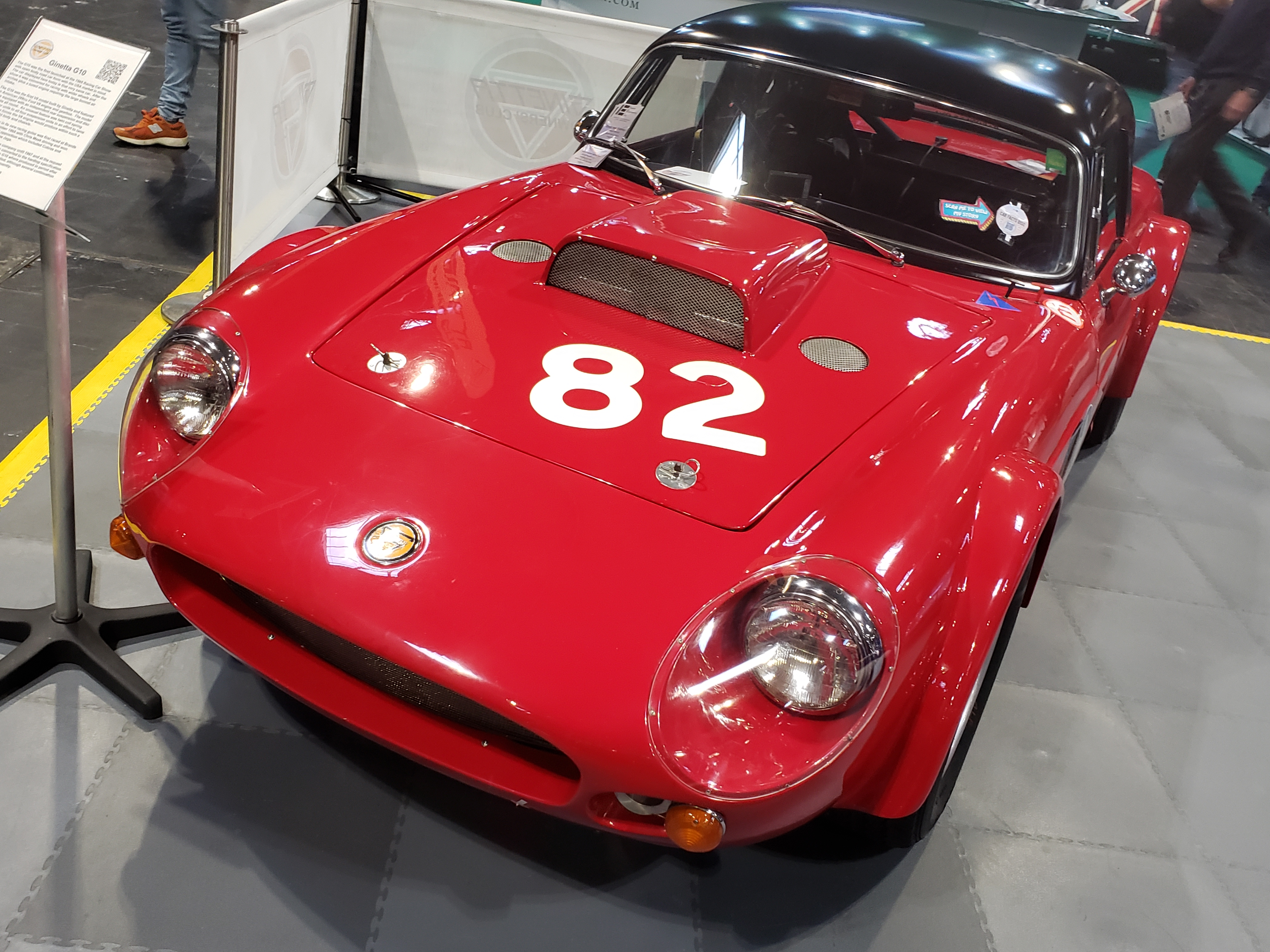

Overview
- Manufacturer: Ginetta
- Production: 1965 (4 made, 1 destroyed)
- Designer: Ivor Walklett

Body and chassis
- Body style: Convertible (Prototype); Coupe (Production)
- Layout: Front Engine, RWD
- Related: Shelby Mustang

Powertrain
- Engine: 4,727 cc (288 cu in) Ford Small Block V8
- Power output: 350 bhp (261 kW); 530 N⋅m (391 lb⋅ft)
- Transmission: 4-speed Manual

Dimensions
- Wheelbase: 2,286 mm (90.0 in)
- Length: 4,115 mm (162.0 in)
- Width: 1,555 mm (61.2 in)
- Height: 1,250 mm (49.2 in)
- Curb weight: 900 kg (1,984 lb)

The G10 was a race car, powered by a Shelby Mustang 289 cu in (4.74 L) V8. The car was originally built as a Ginetta G4, however in 1965 the car was equipped with the much larger Shelby engine in order to go racing in America, becoming the G10. It was based on the already racing proven space frame of the G4, with a new Glass-reinforced plastic body fitted, with MGB doors and windshield. The engine would be fitted with that of the Ford small block, as it was used by the main rival of the G10, the Shelby Cobra, with the original prototype being fit with a standard model making 290 bhp (216 kW), and the later models being fit with a more powerful modified block making 350 bhp (261 kW).

== G11 ==
Ginetta G11

Overview
- Production: 1966-1968 (10 made)
- Designer: Ivor Walklett

Body and chassis
- Body style: Convertible (6 units); Coupé (4 units)
- Layout: Front Engine, RWD
- Related: MG MGB

Powertrain
- Engine: 1,798 cc (110 cu in) BMC B-series I4; 4,727 cc (288 cu in) Ford Small Block V8
- Power output: 94 bhp (70 kW) @ 5,500 rpm; 133 N⋅m (98 lb⋅ft); 350 bhp (261 kW); 530 N⋅m (391 lb⋅ft)
- Transmission: 4-speed Manual

Dimensions
- Wheelbase: 2,286 mm (90.0 in)
- Length: 3,988 mm (157.0 in)
- Width: 1,499 mm (59.0 in)
- Height: 1,250 mm (49.2 in)
- Curb weight: 830 kg (1,830 lb)

The G11 was the road car conversion of the G10, however instead of using the Shelby engine unit found in the G10, it used a MGB 1800 unit, this being said, at least 1 of the units was fitted with the Shelby unit per owner request from factory.

== G10 Remastered ==
The G10 Remastered (sometimes called the "G10 RM") is a replica kit car of the original G10, fit now with a LS motor. The car is hand-built to order by Ginetta, with a hand built interior.

Ginetta G10 Remastered

Overview
- Also called: Ginetta G10 RM
- Production: 2019-present

Body and chassis
- Body style: Coupe
- Layout: Front Engine, RWD
- Related: Chevrolet Camaro

Powertrain
- Engine: 6,162 cc (376 cu in) GM LS V8
- Power output: 450 bhp (336 kW); 450 lb⋅ft (610 N⋅m)
- Transmission: 6-speed Manual

Dimensions
- Curb weight: 950 kg (2,094 lb)
