= GKD Evolution =

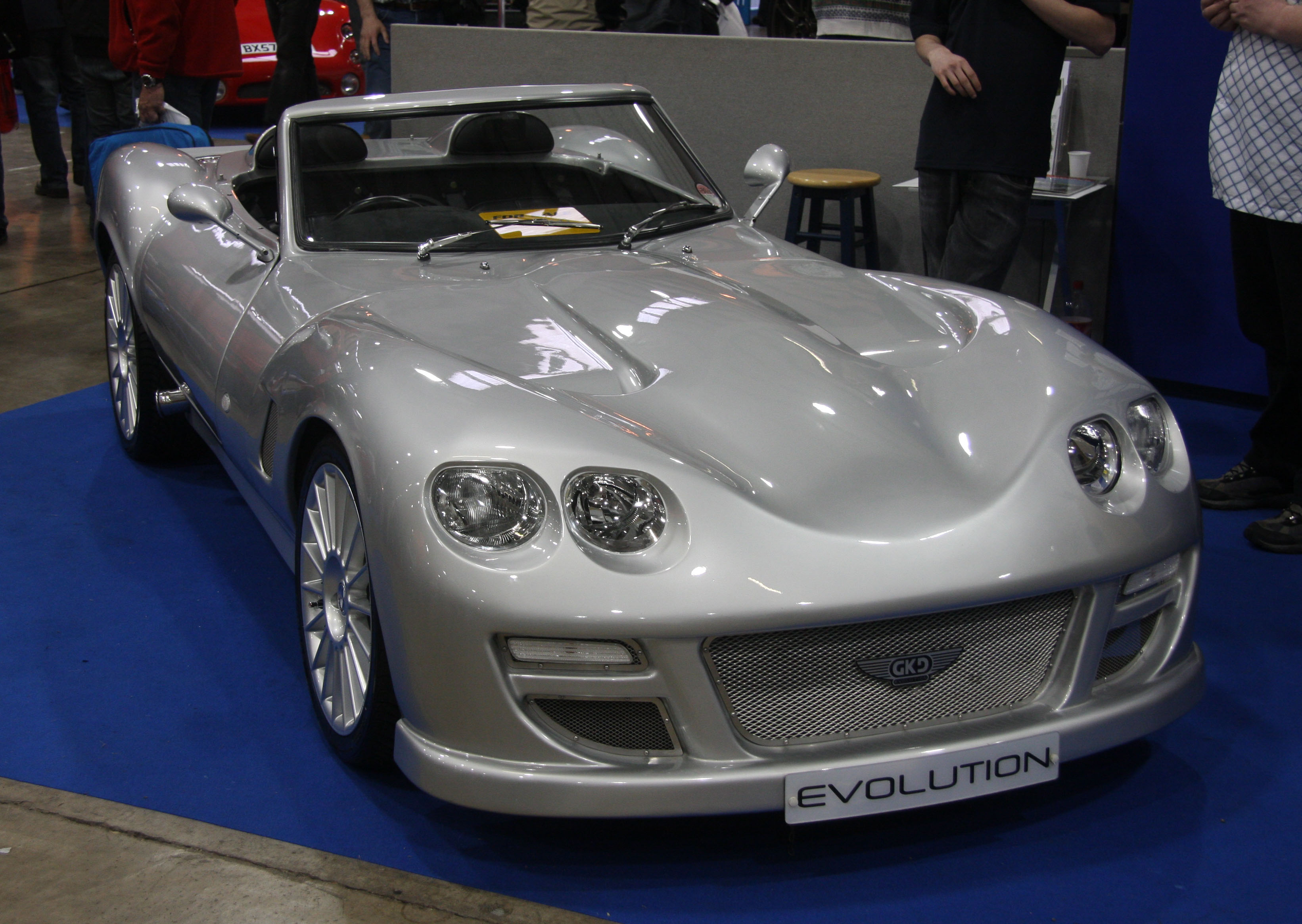

Overview
- Manufacturer: GKD Sports Cars
- Production: 2006–present
- Assembly: Kent, England
- Designer: Peter Lathrope

Body and chassis
- Class: Roadster coupe
- Body style: 2-door convertible coupe
- Layout: FR (Front engine / RWD)
- Platform: Fabricated chassis and double wishbone suspension using BMW E36/E46 donor items

Powertrain
- Engine: Various, including: Nissan RB, Cosworth, BMW Straight 6, Rover V8
- Transmission: Various

Dimensions
- Curb weight: 750 kg (1,653 lb)-850 kg (1,874 lb)

Chronology
- Predecessor: Ginetta G27

The GKD Evolution is a convertible sports car manufactured by British company GKD Sports Cars, based in Boughton Monchelsea, near Maidstone with workshops at Lenham. It was a modified Ginetta G27.

== History ==
On February 27, 2005, GKD Sports Cars purchased the G27 chassis jigs, body moulds, patterns and drawings from Ginetta. A number of changes were introduced; to the front and rear aerodynamics, styling, torsional rigidity for the chassis, weight, and front suspension geometry. The driver seat was updated as well.

An updated car, renamed the Evolution, was launched in 2006. The Evolution has been changed to take BMW 3 Series E36/E46 parts since the Sierra became more difficult to source. The Evolution will take any BMW 4- or 6-cylinder engine.

Parts are also available to G27 owners wanting to upgrade earlier models.

== Components ==
The Evolution uses a donor pack from a BMW 3 Series. The donor pack includes, half-shafts, brakes, prop shaft, steering column and lower steering shaft and if required, engine and gearbox. The large engine bay helps accommodate most engines, including 2.0-litre Cosworth, BMW straight six and Rover V8. The chassis comes with BMW engine mounts already welded to it to ease fitment.

Fully built cars are also supplied to foreign markets, countering crash test requirements.

The body shell is made from GRP fibreglass, with a bespoke chassis housing the engine and suspension.

== Example cars ==
The Evolution can utilize most engines, the chart below indicates performance with a BMW E46 M3 with standard spec.

Performance of sample models
Trim	Weight	Power	Transmission	Estimated 0-60 mph
Road Car	820 kg (1,808 lb)	343 hp (256 kW)	6-Speed	3.2 sec
Road Car	820 kg (1,808 lb)	265 hp (198 kW)	5-Speed	3.8 sec
Road Car	780 kg (1,720 lb)	165 hp (123 kW)	5-Speed	4.3 sec
Race/track car	650 kg (1,433 lb)	200 hp (150 kW)	5-Speed	4.0 sec

== Awards and press comments ==
The S1 Cosworth first production car was awarded car of the year 2006 from Which Kit Car magazine. This included winning 5 out of 7 categories in the competition.

"From the specification, the Evolution comes across as an out and out performance car which, of course, it is but it's also practical."
