= The Lenham School =

Coordinates: 51.2384°N 0.7108°E

Location
- Ham Lane; Lenham, Kent, ME17 2LL; England

Information
- Type: Academy
- Established: 1952
- Local authority: Kent County Council
- Trust: Valley Invicta Academies Trust
- Department for Education URN: 143954 Tables
- Ofsted: Reports
- Head teacher: Rob Ferguson
- Gender: Coeducational
- Age: 11 to 18
- Website: thelenham.viat.org.uk

The Lenham School is a coeducational secondary school and sixth form in Lenham, Kent, England. It opened in 1952, as Swadelands School, and provides a secondary education for 788 boys and girls aged 11 to 18 years.

== History ==
In January 2017, it was announced by the headteacher that the school was converting to an academy, and changing its name from 'Swadelands School' to 'The Lenham School'.

== Academic performance ==
In 2011, 55% of students at the school achieved five A*–C grades at GCSE including English and mathematics, with 87% of students achieving five A*–C grades overall. 2012 saw further improvements.

== Ofsted judgements ==
Ofsted published a report in 2010 which detailed their findings as satisfactory, with a proven ability to attain a rating of good with continued improvement. In 2012, Ofsted returned to assess the ICT subject, which was awarded a rating of good. In 2015 the school's overall effectiveness was rated as "inadequate" by Ofsted, the report stating that "the proportion attaining five good GCSE grades, including in English and mathematics, is significantly below the national average and has declined recently ... teaching, learning and assessment are inadequate. Teaching does not motivate pupils well...many staff lack confidence in the school’s leaders".

== Accreditations ==
The Lenham School holds several national quality standards and awards including the Artsmark Gold Award, Healthy Schools Award, and Eco Schools Silver Award.
