= GKD Sports Cars =

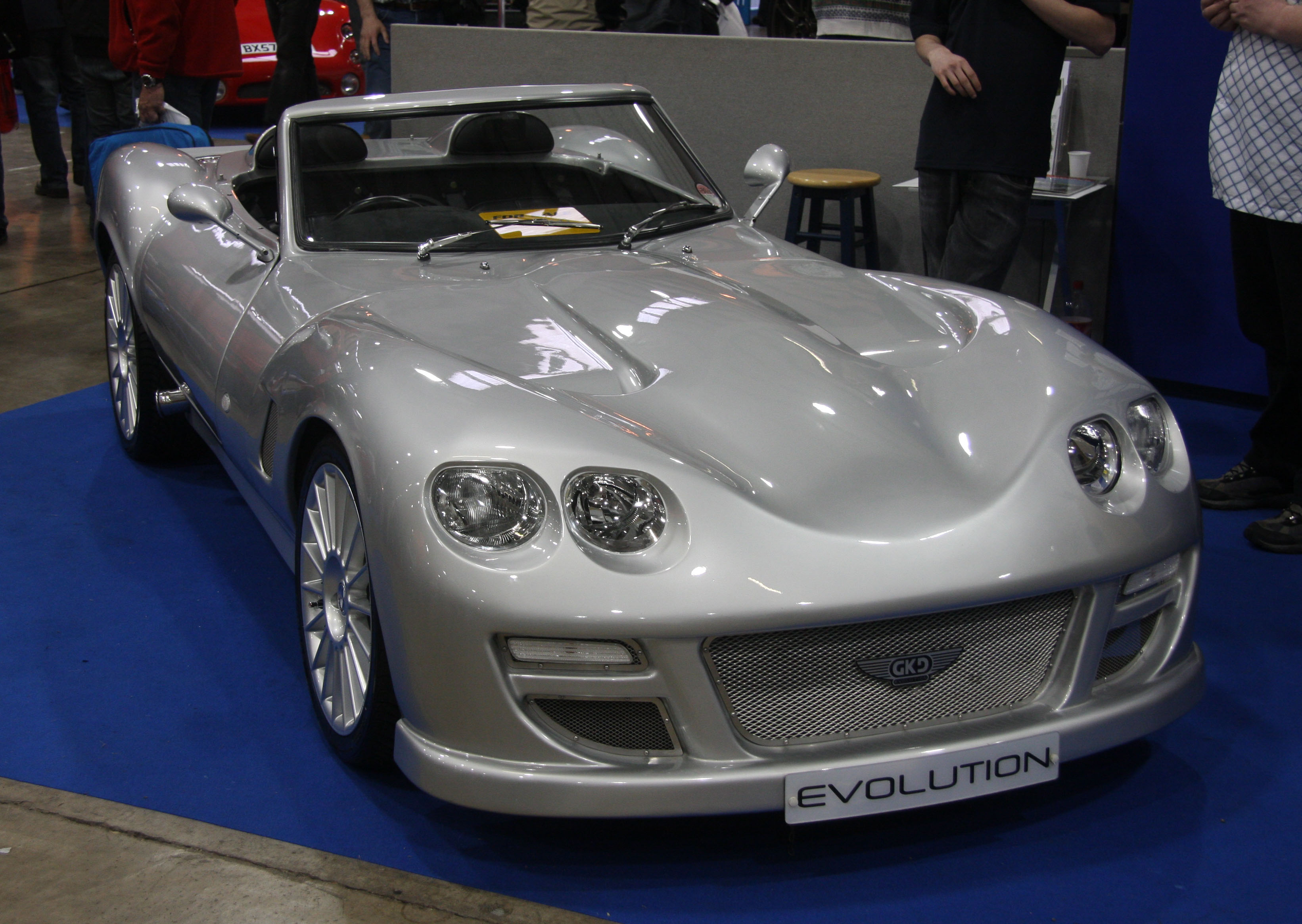

Overview
- Manufacturer: GKD Sports Cars
- Production: 2006–present
- Assembly: Kent, England
- Designer: Peter Lathrope and Richard Ashby

Body and chassis
- Class: Roadster coupe
- Body style: 2-door convertible coupe
- Layout: FR (Front Engine / RWD)
- Platform: Fabricated chassis and double wishbone suspension using BMW E36/E46 donor items

Powertrain
- Engine: Various, including: Nissan RB, Cosworth, BMW Straight 6, Rover V8
- Transmission: Various

Dimensions
- Curb weight: 750 kg (1,653 lb)-850 kg (1,874 lb)

GKD Legend
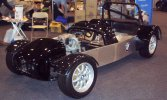

Overview
- Manufacturer: GKD Sports Cars
- Production: 2008–present
- Assembly: Kent, England
- Designer: Peter Lathrope

Body and chassis
- Class: Roadster
- Body style: seven
- Layout: FR (Front engine / RWD)
- Platform: Fabricated chassis and double wishbone suspension using BMW E36/E46 donnor items

Powertrain
- Engine: BMW 4-cylinder engines
- Transmission: BMW

Dimensions
- Curb weight: 585 kg (1,290 lb)-620 kg (1,367 lb)

GKD Sports Cars is a small-volume car manufacturer based in Boughton Monchelsea, near Maidstone, Kent, with workshops at Lenham. GKD Sports Cars produce two models, the GKD Evolution and the GKD Legend.

== History ==
GKD Sports Cars was founded in 2006 when company MD Peter Lathrope purchased the Ginetta G27 project. The car was then modified to improve aerodynamics and styling. The company won car of the year 2006 from Which Kit Car magazine with the Evolution. This included winning 5 out of 7 categories in the competition. In 2008, the company launched two new models, with the Evolution being upgraded to use BMW 3 Series (E36/E46) running gear and then launching a new model, the GKD Legend at the Exeter Kit Car Show in November. This received a very warm welcome with the press and public, as both cars are the first mainstream kit cars to use BMW 3 Series E36/E46 running gear.

== Services ==
As well as supplying and building the Evolution and the Legend, GKD also supplies Racelogic traction control, alloy wheels and tuning parts. GKD Sports Cars also completes part build projects, put cars in for the IVA test and tune and complete engine conversions for BMW road cars.

Because of the Evolution's background, GKD launched the first production hard top for the Ginetta G27. GKD also supplies upgrades and parts for the Ginetta G27.
