= Listed buildings in Lenham =

Historic structures in Kent, England

Lenham is a village and civil parish in the Borough of Maidstone of Kent, England It contains two grade I, six grade II* and 96 grade II listed buildings that are recorded in the National Heritage List for England.

This list is based on the information retrieved online from Historic England.

== Key ==
Grade	Criteria
I	Buildings that are of exceptional interest
II*	Particularly important buildings of more than special interest
II	Buildings that are of special interest

== Listing ==
Name	Grade	Location	Type	Completed (Note: The date given is the date used by Historic England as significant for the initial building or that of an important part in the structure's description.)	Date designated	Grid ref. (Note: The grid reference is based on the British national grid reference system, sometimes known as OSGB36, used by the Ordnance Survey.) Geo-coordinates	Notes	Entry number (Note: The "List Entry Number" is a unique number assigned to each listed building and scheduled monument by Historic England.)	Image	Wikidata
'the Cross': A Hill-figure War Memorial at Lenham	II				5 December 2017	TQ9057952770; 51°14′32″N 0°43′44″E		1438738	'the Cross': A Hill-figure War Memorial at Lenham More images	Q66478028
Church of St Mary	I				26 April 1968	TQ8991752127; 51°14′12″N 0°43′09″E		1086103	Church of St Mary More images	Q7594362
Headstone to Elizabeth Carter Circa 11 Yards West of Tower of Church of St Mary	II				14 December 1984	TQ8989052126; 51°14′12″N 0°43′08″E		1086104	Upload Photo	Q96096391
Monument to George Powelle and Others, Circa 5 Yards North of North Porch of Church of St Mary	II	Circa 5 Yards North Of North Porch Of Church Of St Mary			14 December 1984	TQ8991452144; 51°14′13″N 0°43′09″E		1086105	Upload Photo	Q96096389
Table Tomb Circa 50 Yards North East of Vestry of Church of St Mary	II				14 December 1984	TQ8996952132; 51°14′12″N 0°43′12″E		1086107	Upload Photo	Q96096387
Table Tomb Circa 7 Yards South of Chancel of Church of St Mary	II				14 December 1984	TQ8993952107; 51°14′11″N 0°43′10″E		1086106	Upload Photo	Q96096388
Pump Against South Wall of Douglas Almshouses, (north Row)	II	(north Row), Faversham Road			7 May 1971	TQ8984452250; 51°14′16″N 0°43′05″E		1086112	Upload Photo	Q26375794
Old Shelve	II	Ashford Road			26 April 1968	TQ9241951243; 51°13′41″N 0°45′16″E		1186033	Upload Photo	Q26481306
Halfway House	II	Boughton Road, Sandway			14 December 1984	TQ8906651413; 51°13′50″N 0°42′24″E		1336333	Upload Photo	Q26620828
Lewsome Farmhouse	II	Boughton Road, Sandway			14 December 1984	TQ8866250298; 51°13′15″N 0°42′01″E		1086108	Upload Photo	Q26375773
Little Barleythorpe	II	Boughton Road, Sandway			14 December 1984	TQ8901851356; 51°13′48″N 0°42′21″E		1186105	Upload Photo	Q26481377
Oxley House Including Attached Granary	II	Boughton Road			25 February 1994	TQ8901751098; 51°13′40″N 0°42′21″E		1253152	Upload Photo	Q26544941
The Forstal	II	Bull Lane			14 December 1984	TQ9130250265; 51°13′10″N 0°44′17″E		1186118	Upload Photo	Q26481391
Norman Funnell, Butcher	II	Butcher, 13, The Square			20 October 1952	TQ8990652193; 51°14′14″N 0°43′09″E		1320138	Upload Photo	Q26606171
Boldrewood Farmyard, 2 Barns, Cart Shelter, Stables and Granary-cum-cartshed with Linking Walls	II	Old Ham Lane			14 December 1984	TQ8809952004; 51°14′10″N 0°41′35″E		1116258	Upload Photo	Q26409894
Barnside Cottage Church Cottage White Cottage	II	3, Church Square			14 December 1984	TQ8987752128; 51°14′12″N 0°43′07″E		1086109	Upload Photo	Q26375778
Court Lodge Cottage	II	4, 5, 6 and 7, Church Square			26 April 1968	TQ8985052119; 51°14′12″N 0°43′06″E		1299358	Upload Photo	Q26586768
The Tithe Barn	I	Court Lodge Farm, High Street, ME17 2QD			20 October 1952	TQ8988452057; 51°14′10″N 0°43′07″E		1116543	The Tithe Barn More images	Q7809943
Burnt Mill (the Mill Building)	II	Egerton Road, Charing Heath			14 February 1967	TQ9123049149; 51°12′34″N 0°44′11″E		1299562	Upload Photo	Q26586953
Elmstone Hole Farmhouse	II	Elmstone Hole Road, Elmstone Hole			24 April 1968	TQ8693849898; 51°13′04″N 0°40′31″E		1336334	Upload Photo	Q26620829
Oast House Circa 15 Yards North of Elmstone Hole Farmhouse	II	Elmstone Hole Road, Elmstone Hole			14 December 1984	TQ8693949914; 51°13′04″N 0°40′31″E		1186150	Upload Photo	Q26481422
Oast House at Tq 870 499	II	Elmstone Hole Road, Elmstone Hole			14 December 1984	TQ8701449888; 51°13′03″N 0°40′35″E		1086110	Upload Photo	Q26375784
Corner House Lenham Greengrocers Rebecca's Antiques and Furnishings	II*	2 and 4, Faversham Road			20 October 1952	TQ8986752214; 51°14′15″N 0°43′07″E		1060957	Corner House Lenham Greengrocers Rebecca's Antiques and Furnishings More images	Q17545048
Douglas Almshouses (north Row)	II	Faversham Road			7 May 1971	TQ8985052248; 51°14′16″N 0°43′06″E		1086111	Upload Photo	Q26375788
Douglas Almshouses (south Row)	II	Faversham Road			7 May 1971	TQ8984952237; 51°14′16″N 0°43′06″E		1186175	Upload Photo	Q26481443
Lurcocks of Lenham and the Bow Window	II	Faversham Road			26 April 1968	TQ8985152221; 51°14′15″N 0°43′06″E		1060956	Upload Photo	Q26314100
The Lock-up Or Mortuary	II	Faversham Road			20 October 1952	TQ8986452239; 51°14′16″N 0°43′06″E		1186182	The Lock-up Or Mortuary More images	Q17641176
Dovecote Circa 20 Yards South of New Shelve Farmhouse	II	Forstal Road			14 December 1984	TQ9178251515; 51°13′50″N 0°44′44″E		1186186	Upload Photo	Q26481454
New Shelve Farmhouse	II	Forstal Road			26 April 1968	TQ9180251545; 51°13′51″N 0°44′45″E		1336297	Upload Photo	Q26620798
Keepers Farmhouse	II	Ham Lane			14 December 1984	TQ8838051545; 51°13′55″N 0°41′49″E		1060994	Upload Photo	Q26314132
Leadingcross Green Farmhouse	II	Headcorn Road, Sandway			14 December 1984	TQ8902051434; 51°13′51″N 0°42′21″E		1086115	Upload Photo	Q26375810
Ridding House	II	Headcorn Road, Sandway			14 December 1984	TQ8824650746; 51°13′29″N 0°41′40″E		1186226	Upload Photo	Q26481489
10, High Street	II	10, High Street			26 April 1968	TQ8979852131; 51°14′12″N 0°43′03″E		1060974	Upload Photo	Q26314115
11, High Street	II	11, High Street			26 April 1968	TQ8980952111; 51°14′12″N 0°43′03″E		1336300	Upload Photo	Q26620801
12-16, High Street	II	12-16, High Street			26 April 1968	TQ8979252124; 51°14′12″N 0°43′03″E		1344256	Upload Photo	Q26627994
13, High Street (see Details for Further Address Information)	II	13, High Street			26 April 1968	TQ8980352102; 51°14′11″N 0°43′03″E		1299294	Upload Photo	Q26586707
17, High Street	II	17, High Street			26 April 1968	TQ8979952096; 51°14′11″N 0°43′03″E		1086117	Upload Photo	Q26375820
18-22, High Street	II	18-22, High Street			26 April 1968	TQ8978352111; 51°14′12″N 0°43′02″E		1060975	Upload Photo	Q26314116
24 and 26, High Street	II	24 and 26, High Street			26 April 1968	TQ8977652098; 51°14′11″N 0°43′02″E		1344257	Upload Photo	Q26627995
4, High Street	II	4, High Street			26 April 1968	TQ8980852144; 51°14′13″N 0°43′03″E		1319921	Upload Photo	Q26605978
58 and 60, High Street	II	58 and 60, High Street			14 December 1984	TQ8966252076; 51°14′11″N 0°42′56″E		1344258	Upload Photo	Q26627996
6 and 8, High Street	II	6 and 8, High Street			26 April 1968	TQ8980452137; 51°14′13″N 0°43′03″E		1060973	Upload Photo	Q26314114
62, High Street	II	62, High Street			14 December 1984	TQ8966352042; 51°14′10″N 0°42′56″E		1060977	Upload Photo	Q26314117
67-73, High Street	II	67-73, High Street			14 December 1984	TQ8958651996; 51°14′08″N 0°42′52″E		1336301	Upload Photo	Q26620802
7, High Street	II	7, High Street			26 April 1968	TQ8982152125; 51°14′12″N 0°43′04″E		1086116	Upload Photo	Q26375816
Court Lodge	II	High Street			14 December 1984	TQ8982652014; 51°14′09″N 0°43′04″E		1086118	Upload Photo	Q26375825
D M Sayer and Co E E Pilbeam the Saxon Bower	II	1a, High Street			14 December 1984	TQ8983052141; 51°14′13″N 0°43′05″E		1336299	Upload Photo	Q26620800
Honeywood	II*	56, High Street			20 October 1952	TQ8968952047; 51°14′10″N 0°42′57″E		1060976	Honeywood More images	Q17545062
Lenham Computer Services	II	9, High Street			26 April 1968	TQ8981752119; 51°14′12″N 0°43′04″E		1186248	Upload Photo	Q26481506
Maison Stella	II	5, High Street			26 April 1968	TQ8982552131; 51°14′12″N 0°43′04″E		1186240	Upload Photo	Q26481500
Hubbards Farmhouse	II	Hook Street, Lenham Heath			14 December 1984	TQ9079649485; 51°12′46″N 0°43′49″E		1060978	Upload Photo	Q26314118
Yew Tree Cottage	II	Hook Street, Lenham Heath			14 December 1984	TQ9085449654; 51°12′51″N 0°43′53″E		1060979	Upload Photo	Q26314119
Forstal Cottages	II	4 and 5, Lenham Forstal Road			14 December 1984	TQ9133250298; 51°13′11″N 0°44′18″E		1060981	Upload Photo	Q26314121
Mount Castle Farm Cottage	II	Lenham Forstal Road			14 December 1984	TQ9090250418; 51°13′16″N 0°43′56″E		1116450	Upload Photo	Q26410061
Crabbe Farmhouse	II	Lenham Heath			14 December 1984	TQ9154849956; 51°13′00″N 0°44′29″E		1060983	Upload Photo	Q26314123
Bank House	II	Lenham Heath Road, Sandway			14 December 1984	TQ8853651123; 51°13′41″N 0°41′56″E		1344260	Upload Photo	Q26627998
Barn Circa 7 Yards South of Home Farmhouse	II	Lenham Heath Road, Sandway			14 December 1984	TQ8898150898; 51°13′34″N 0°42′18″E		1060987	Upload Photo	Q26314126
Chapel Mill	II	Lenham Heath Road, Lenham Heath			26 April 1968	TQ9031450287; 51°13′12″N 0°43′26″E		1116458	Upload Photo	Q26410066
Coast Cottages	II	1 and 2, Lenham Heath Road, Sandway			14 December 1984	TQ8841651172; 51°13′43″N 0°41′50″E		1116385	Upload Photo	Q26410007
Home Cottages	II	1 and 2, Lenham Heath Road, Sandway			14 December 1984	TQ8895350939; 51°13′35″N 0°42′17″E		1060986	Upload Photo	Q26314125
Home Farm Cottages Home Farm House	II	1 and 2, Lenham Heath Road, Sandway			14 December 1984	TQ8897350928; 51°13′35″N 0°42′18″E		1116372	Upload Photo	Q26409996
Norham House	II	Lenham Heath Road			26 April 1968	TQ9159149612; 51°12′49″N 0°44′30″E		1060985	Upload Photo	Q26314124
Royton Manor	II*	Lenham Heath Road, Lenham Heath			26 April 1968	TQ9038850340; 51°13′14″N 0°43′30″E		1060984	Upload Photo	Q17545067
Sheathers	II	Lenham Heath Road, Lenham Heath			14 December 1984	TQ9129249663; 51°12′51″N 0°44′15″E		1116411	Upload Photo	Q26410026
Vine House	II	Lenham Heath Road			14 December 1984	TQ9081349831; 51°12′57″N 0°43′51″E		1116404	Upload Photo	Q26410019
24, 26, 28a and 28b, Lenham Road	II	24, 26, 28a and 28b, Lenham Road, Platt's Heath			3 June 1976	TQ8767050685; 51°13′28″N 0°41′11″E		1060980	Upload Photo	Q26314120
Yew Tree	II	Lenham Road, Platt's Heath			14 December 1984	TQ8732250636; 51°13′27″N 0°40′53″E		1116478	Upload Photo	Q26410085
Old Meads, Little Meads and Ash House	II	Little Meads And Ash House, Old Ashford Road			14 December 1984	TQ9000852130; 51°14′12″N 0°43′14″E		1116268	Upload Photo	Q26409904
1 and 2, Liverton Street	II	1 and 2, Liverton Street			14 December 1984	TQ8739449976; 51°13′06″N 0°40′55″E		1320000	Upload Photo	Q26606047
Bowley Cottage Bowley Hall Cottage	II	Liverton Street			14 December 1984	TQ8743450084; 51°13′09″N 0°40′57″E		1344262	Upload Photo	Q26628000
Churchill Cottage	II	8, Liverton Street			14 December 1984	TQ8744150019; 51°13′07″N 0°40′57″E		1116353	Upload Photo	Q26409977
Mansion Farmhouse	II	Liverton Street			14 December 1984	TQ8746250064; 51°13′08″N 0°40′59″E		1344261	Upload Photo	Q26627999
Plough House	II	Liverton Street			14 December 1984	TQ8745650084; 51°13′09″N 0°40′58″E		1116343	Upload Photo	Q26409968
17, Maidstone Road	II	17, Maidstone Road			14 December 1984	TQ8976252183; 51°14′14″N 0°43′01″E		1060990	Upload Photo	Q26314129
2, 4, 6 and 6a, Maidstone Road	II	2, 4, 6 and 6a, Maidstone Road			13 March 1975	TQ8979952180; 51°14′14″N 0°43′03″E		1060989	Upload Photo	Q26314128
21 and 23, Maidstone Road	II	21 and 23, Maidstone Road			26 April 1968	TQ8974252193; 51°14′15″N 0°43′00″E		1116285	Upload Photo	Q26409917
5, Maidstone Road	II	5, Maidstone Road			20 October 1952	TQ8980252164; 51°14′13″N 0°43′03″E		1344263	Upload Photo	Q26628001
7, Maidstone Road	II	7, Maidstone Road			20 October 1952	TQ8979852165; 51°14′14″N 0°43′03″E		1320017	Upload Photo	Q26606062
Parapet House	II	Maidstone Road			26 April 1968	TQ8964952256; 51°14′17″N 0°42′55″E		1060991	Upload Photo	Q26314130
Saxon Warriors	II	1-3, Maidstone Road			14 December 1984	TQ8981352149; 51°14′13″N 0°43′04″E		1116330	Upload Photo	Q26409956
Forge House	II*	Old Ashford Road			20 October 1952	TQ8996152155; 51°14′13″N 0°43′11″E		1060992	Upload Photo	Q17545071
Grove House	II	Old Ashford Road			26 April 1968	TQ9000552208; 51°14′15″N 0°43′14″E		1320010	Upload Photo	Q26606056
Mounting Block Circa 23 Yards North of Church of St Mary	II	Old Ashford Road			14 December 1984	TQ8992952156; 51°14′13″N 0°43′10″E		1344264	Upload Photo	Q26628002
Tanyard Farmhouse	II	Old Ashford Road			26 April 1968	TQ9030451964; 51°14′06″N 0°43′29″E		1344265	Upload Photo	Q26628003
Boldrewood Farmhouse	II	Old Ham Lane			14 December 1984	TQ8817451994; 51°14′10″N 0°41′39″E		1060993	Upload Photo	Q26314131
Lenham Court	II*	Old Ham Lane			14 December 1984	TQ8841851992; 51°14′10″N 0°41′52″E		1116246	Upload Photo	Q17545187
Marley Court	II	Pilgrims Way			14 December 1984	TQ8864353339; 51°14′53″N 0°42′06″E		1116203	Upload Photo	Q26409848
Marlow Farmhouse	II	Pilgrims Way			14 December 1984	TQ8943953543; 51°14′59″N 0°42′47″E		1060952	Upload Photo	Q26314096
Hope Cottage	II	Runham Lane			14 December 1984	TQ8725751401; 51°13′52″N 0°40′51″E		1344285	Upload Photo	Q26628021
Lower Runham Farmhouse	II	Runham Lane			14 December 1984	TQ8718651358; 51°13′51″N 0°40′47″E		1060953	Upload Photo	Q26314097
14, 15 and 16, the Square	II*	14, 15 and 16, The Square			20 October 1952	TQ8992052178; 51°14′14″N 0°43′09″E		1060960	Upload Photo	Q17545052
Carter and Partners	II	The Square			14 December 1984	TQ8984652148; 51°14′13″N 0°43′05″E		1116032	Upload Photo	Q26409692
Dog and Bear Hotel the Stores	II	The Square			20 October 1952	TQ8982752188; 51°14′14″N 0°43′04″E		1060955	Upload Photo	Q26314099
K6 Telephone Kiosk Outside Village Hall	II	The Square			19 November 1987	TQ8989452191; 51°14′14″N 0°43′08″E		1253132	Upload Photo	Q26544933
Kent County Library	II	The Square			14 December 1984	TQ8989152200; 51°14′15″N 0°43′08″E		1060959	Upload Photo	Q26314102
No 10 and Hand Rails and Railings Attached the Caravel Hotel	II	10, The Square			26 April 1968	TQ8988352205; 51°14′15″N 0°43′07″E		1060958	Upload Photo	Q26314101
R B House and Hand Rails Attached	II	The Square			26 April 1968	TQ8984352210; 51°14′15″N 0°43′05″E		1344287	Upload Photo	Q26628023
The Red Lion	II	The Square			20 October 1952	TQ8981652175; 51°14′14″N 0°43′04″E		1344286	The Red Lion More images	Q26628022
The Chequers	II	The Square (central Island)			14 December 1984	TQ8987452175; 51°14′14″N 0°43′07″E		1060954	The Chequers More images	Q26314098
Blue House Farmhouse	II	Warren Street			14 December 1984	TQ9274253114; 51°14′41″N 0°45′36″E		1060961	Upload Photo	Q26314103
Barn Circa 20 Yards South West of Waterditch Farmhouse	II	Waterditch Road			14 December 1984	TQ9332352329; 51°14′15″N 0°46′05″E		1060962	Upload Photo	Q26314104
High Farmhouse	II	West Street			26 April 1968	TQ9010953893; 51°15′09″N 0°43′22″E		1320246	Upload Photo	Q26606269
Honeywood Farmhouse	II	West Street			26 April 1968	TQ9012253906; 51°15′09″N 0°43′23″E		1344248	Upload Photo	Q26627985
Pond Cottage	II	Woodside Green			14 December 1984	TQ9048453833; 51°15′07″N 0°43′41″E		1115806	Upload Photo	Q26409494

== See also ==
- Grade I listed buildings in Kent
- Grade II* listed buildings in Kent

== Sources ==
- Newman, John (2012) [1969], Kent: West and the Weald, The Buildings of England, New Haven and London: Yale University Press, ISBN 978-0-300-18509-6
