= Ginetta G4 =

Sports Car

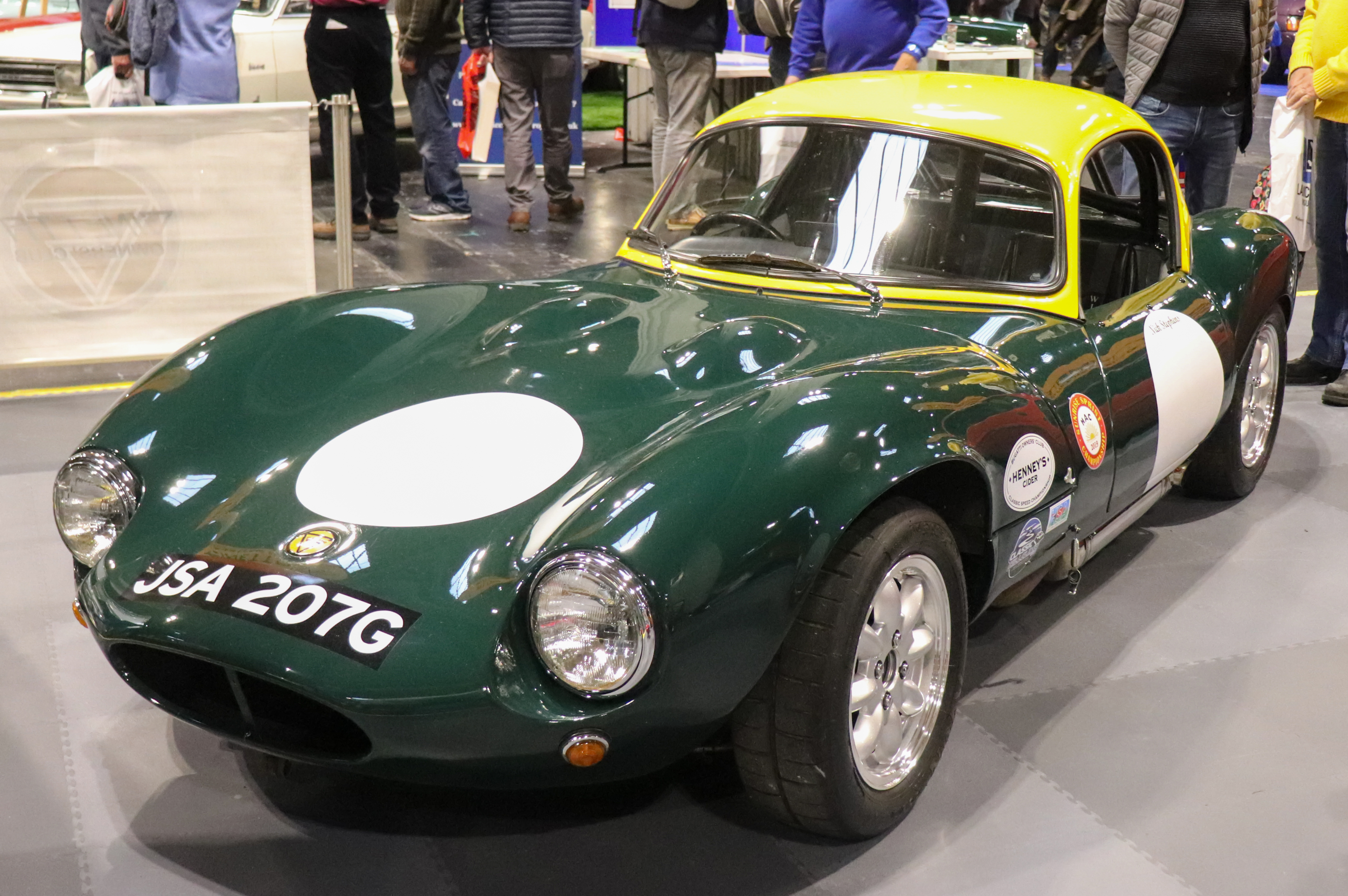
- 1968 Ginetta G4

Overview
- Manufacturer: Ginetta Cars
- Model code: G4
- Production: 1959-1969; 1981-1989
- Designer: Ivor Walklett

Body and chassis
- Body style: 2-door coupé 2-door roadster 2-door barchetta
- Layout: Front engine, rear-wheel drive
- Chassis: Tubular chassis

Powertrain
- Engine: see table
- Transmission: 4/5-speed manual

Dimensions
- Wheelbase: 2,045 mm (80.5 in)
- Length: 3,533 mm (139.1 in)
- Width: 1,422 mm (56.0 in)
- Height: 1,067 mm (42.0 in)
- Kerb weight: 385–580 kg (849–1,279 lb)

Chronology
- Predecessor: Ginetta G3
- Successor: Ginetta G27

The Ginetta G3 and G4 is a series of sports cars, designed, developed, and built by British manufacturer Ginetta, between 1959 and 1968 and again between 1981 and 1984. The G3 was introduced with a glass fibre body in 1959 to be followed by the very similar G4 in 1961. The G4 used the new Ford 105E engine and had a glass fibre GT-style body along with the suspension updated to coil springs at the front with a Ford live axle at the rear. Whereas the earlier G2 and G3 had been designed for racing, the G4 was usable as an everyday car but still was very competitive in motorsport with numerous successes.

The G4 was so successful in kit car racing that it was banned in the mid-1980s, prompting Ginetta to develop its replacement, the very similar G27.

== Design ==
The car was available with three different bodies, a 2-door coupé, a 2-door convertible, and a 2-door barchetta reserved for competition. The front brakes are discs while the rear brakes are drums. The turning circle is 9.1 m (30 ft).

In 1963, a coupé variant was introduced alongside the open-top variant and a BMC axle replaced the Ford unit at the rear. In road tests, the car attains a top speed of 190 km/h (120 mph) with a 1,500 cc engine. Also introduced in 1963 was the Series II, which was redesigned with a longer tail rather than the original, truncated design. The front suspension was also revised. Late in this run, in 1966, the chassis was replaced by a new, stronger, square-tubed spaceframe and it now used the front suspension from the Triumph Herald. The windscreen was also more steeply raked, while the front bumper design was revised. The series III version of 1966 added lay-down headlights to meet new code requirements. Production stopped in 1969 but was revived in 1981 with the Series IV which was 2 in (51 mm) wider and 3 in (76 mm) longer than the III. Over 500 units were made up to 1969 with a variety of Ford engines.

=== Engines ===
The car is fitted with a 1,340 cc (82 cu in) four-cylinder in-line engine, developing 91 hp (68 kW), placed in the front longitudinal position which allows it to reach the maximum speed of 193 km/h (120 mph) and to perform the 0-100 km/h in 8.5 seconds. Typical engine options started with the 997 cc "105E" Ford Kent engine, ranging up to the Cortina's 1.5-litre variant.

A variety of other engines have also been fitted to G4s, ranging up to the Lotus-Ford Twin Cam, and have also been homologated for certain racing classes for the G4.

== 1981 revival ==
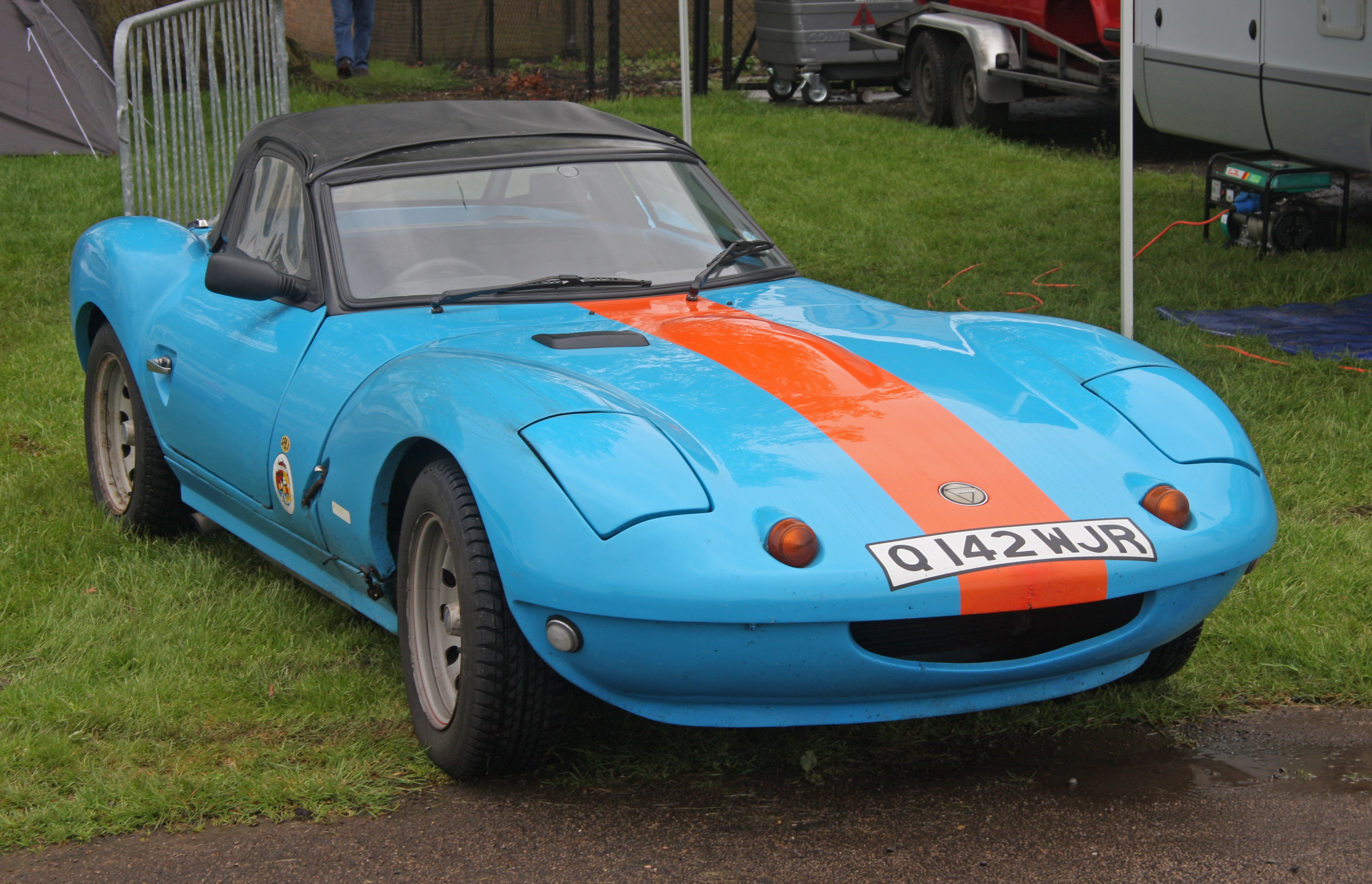
Ginetta G4 Series IV

The G4 was re-introduced in 1981 as the G4 Series IV, with a new chassis. It was produced through to 1984 with approximately 35 examples built. The Series IV was powered by a 1,599 cc Ford four-cylinder engine.

The final development was the Series V, which replaced the live axle with a trailing arm, independent rear suspension. Ginetta stuck to Ford for sourcing the final drive, but only two examples were built (one of which was a modified Series IV).

== DARE Ginetta G4 ==
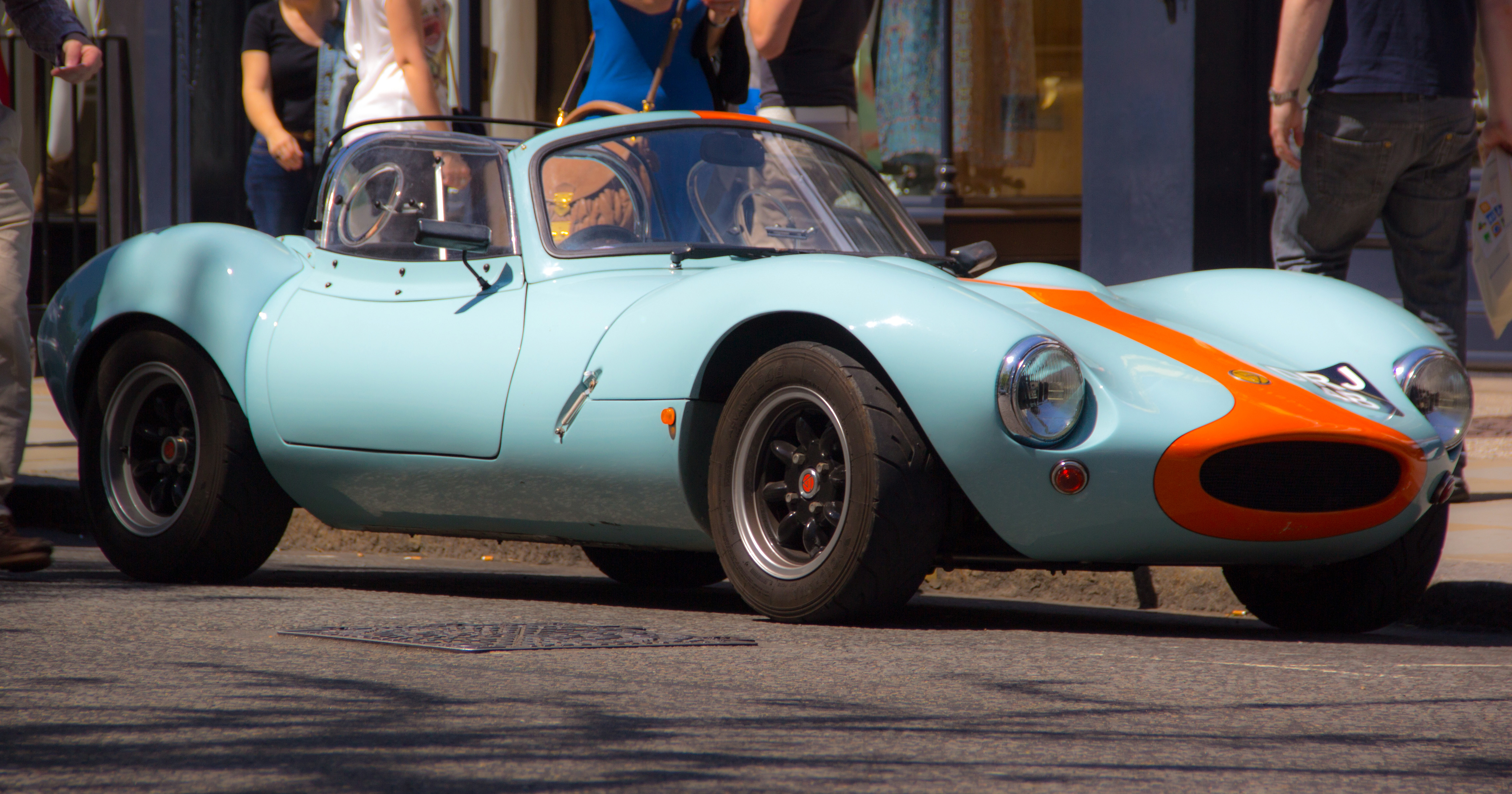
DARE Ginetta G4

After selling Ginetta, brothers Trevor and Ivor Walklett formed a new company called Design And Research Engineering (DARE) with the intent of building Ginetta's old designs – for which there were considerable demand, particularly in Japan. DARE resumed manufacture of the G4 and some other models in the 1990s.
