= Jösse Car =

Defunct Swedish car manufacturer

Jösse Car AB
- Company type: Aktiebolag
- Industry: Automotive
- Founded: February 1994 in Arvika, Sweden
- Founder: Bengt Lidmalm; Sven-Olof Fogelberg
- Defunct: March 2003
- Fate: Bankruptcy
- Headquarters: Åmål, Sweden
- Key people: Hans Philip Zackau (Chief Designer)
- Products: Indigo 3000
- Website: Official website

Jösse Car was a sports car manufacturer founded in 1994 and located in Arvika, Sweden. They produced one vehicle, the two seater roadster Indigo 3000.

== History ==
In October 1993, Bengt Lidmalm visited the TVR showroom in Earl's Court, London, and began looking into the idea of creating his own sportscar. Lidmalm partnered with Sven-Olof Fogelberg of Volvo founding Jösse Car AB in Arvika, Sweden in 1994. Hans Philip Zackau who designed the Volvo 850 was recruited as chief designer to design their first car, the Indigo 3000 powered by a 3 litre Volvo engine and based around a lightweight body on a galvanized steel frame.

In March 1996, Jösse Car produced their first customer vehicle. In media tests, the Indigo 3000 performed well against competitor cars including the Alfa Romeo Spider and BMW Z3. The Indigo 3000 was awarded the "Utmärkt Svensk Form" ('Excellent Swedish Design') in September. The company planned to produce 50 cars in 1996, 250 in 1997 and reaching a maximum manufacture of 500 vehicles per year from 1998 onwards.

The following year, Jösse Car opened their new factory in Åmål. The company also displayed the Indigo 3000 at AutoRAI 1997 in Amsterdam. They would manufacture a total of 44 cars between 1996 and 1999 before declaring bankruptcy in 2003.

In 2013, a decade after Jösse Car folded, co-founder Lidmalm spoke about his experiences during the summer speaker series on Sveriges Radio P4. He was a key support of an Indigo 3000 rally in Sweden during the summer of 2021. 20 of the original 44 cars were reuinited.

== Ownership and funding ==
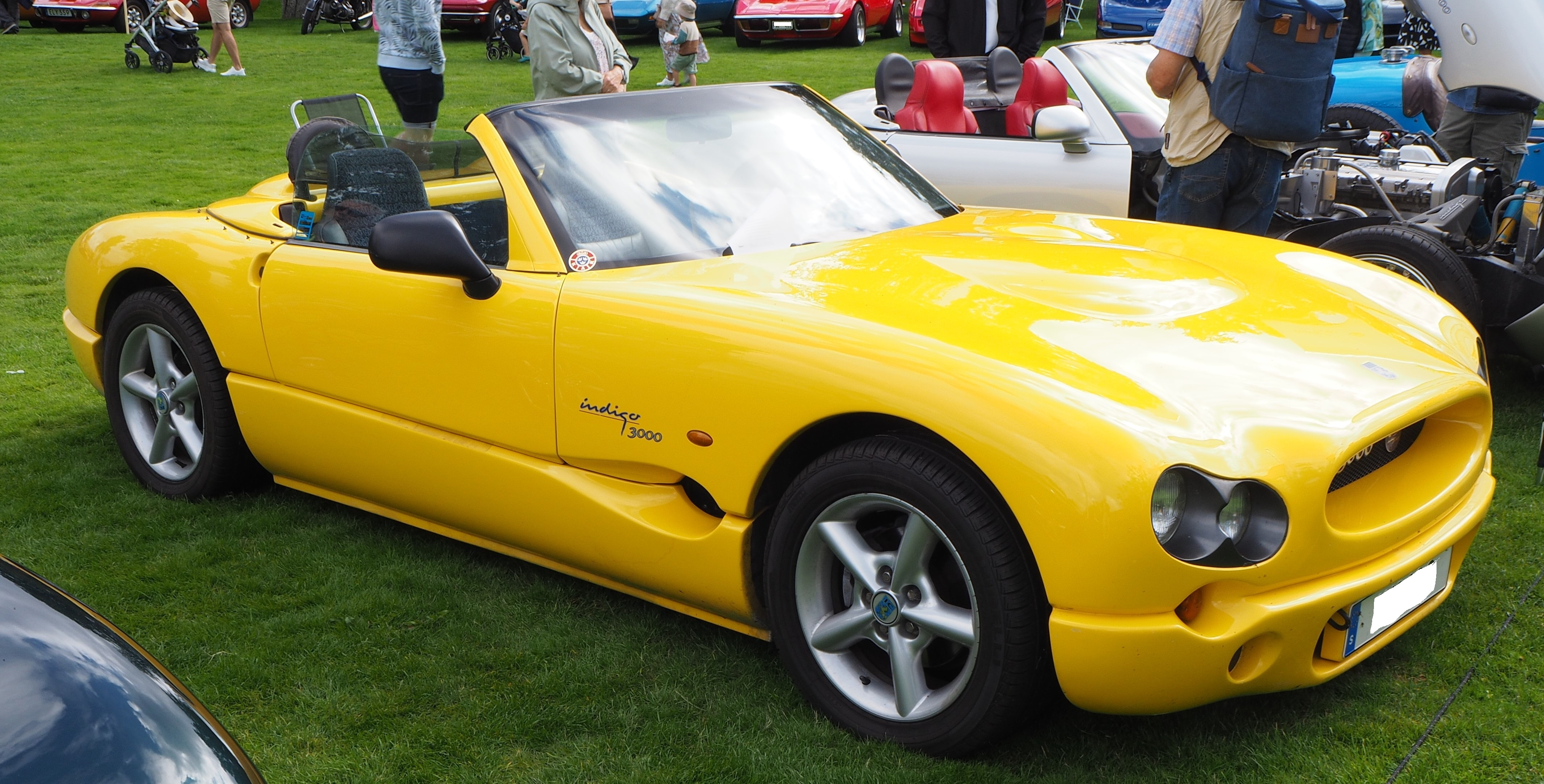
An Indigo 3000 in 2023

In 1996, the company ownership was split 75% to Lindmalm and 25% to Fogelberg. At the time their shareholding was worth a combined 1million SKr. Funding was provided by the Swedish Government via the Almi fund, and 6.5million SKr from a regional Swedish bank.

== Indigo 3000 ==
The Indigo 3000 is a Swedish sports car produced by Jösse Car from 1996–2000. 44 working cars were produced and it was the only car manufactured by Jösse Car before they folded.

The Indigo 3000 is a two-seat, rear-wheel drive roadster powered by a 3.0 L, all aluminum, Volvo straight-six engine which is connected to a Volvo 960 gearbox driving the rear wheels. It could accelerate from 0-60 mph (0-97 km/h) in 6.5 seconds and has a claimed top speed of 250 km/h (155 mph).
