= Lenham =

Village in Kent, England

Coordinates: 51.238°N 0.716°E

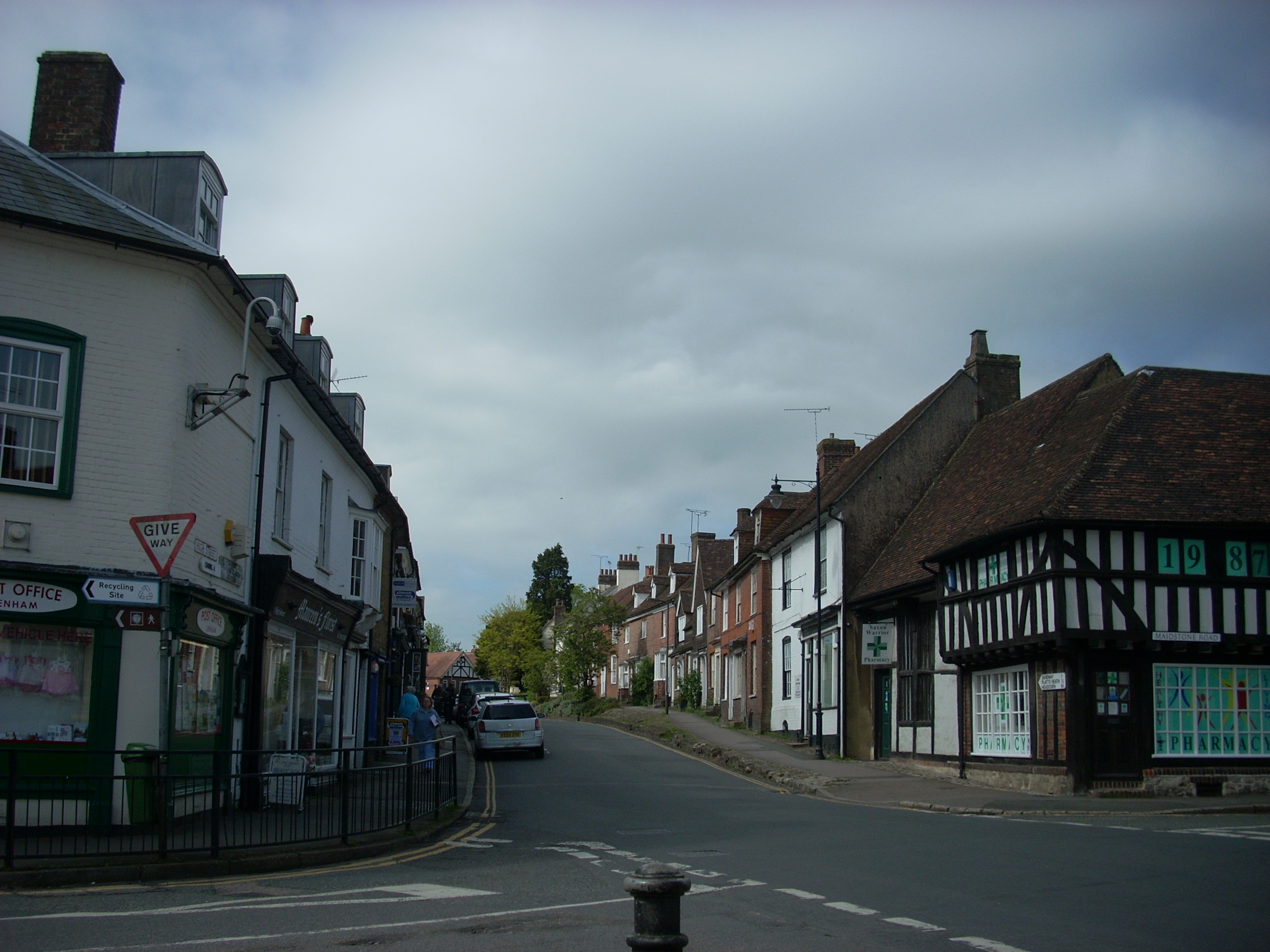
- High Street

- Location within Kent
- Area: 23.4906 km^{2} (9.0698 sq mi)
- Population: 3,370 (2011)
  - Density: 143/km^{2} (370/sq mi)
- OS grid reference: TQ585395
- Civil parish: Lenham
- District: Maidstone
- Shire county: Kent
- Region: South East
- Country: England
- Sovereign state: United Kingdom
- Post town: Maidstone
- Postcode district: ME17
- Police: Kent
- Fire: Kent
- Ambulance: South East Coast

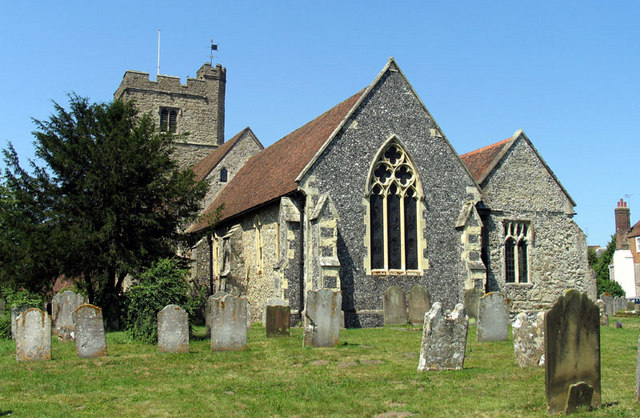
St. Mary's Church, Lenham

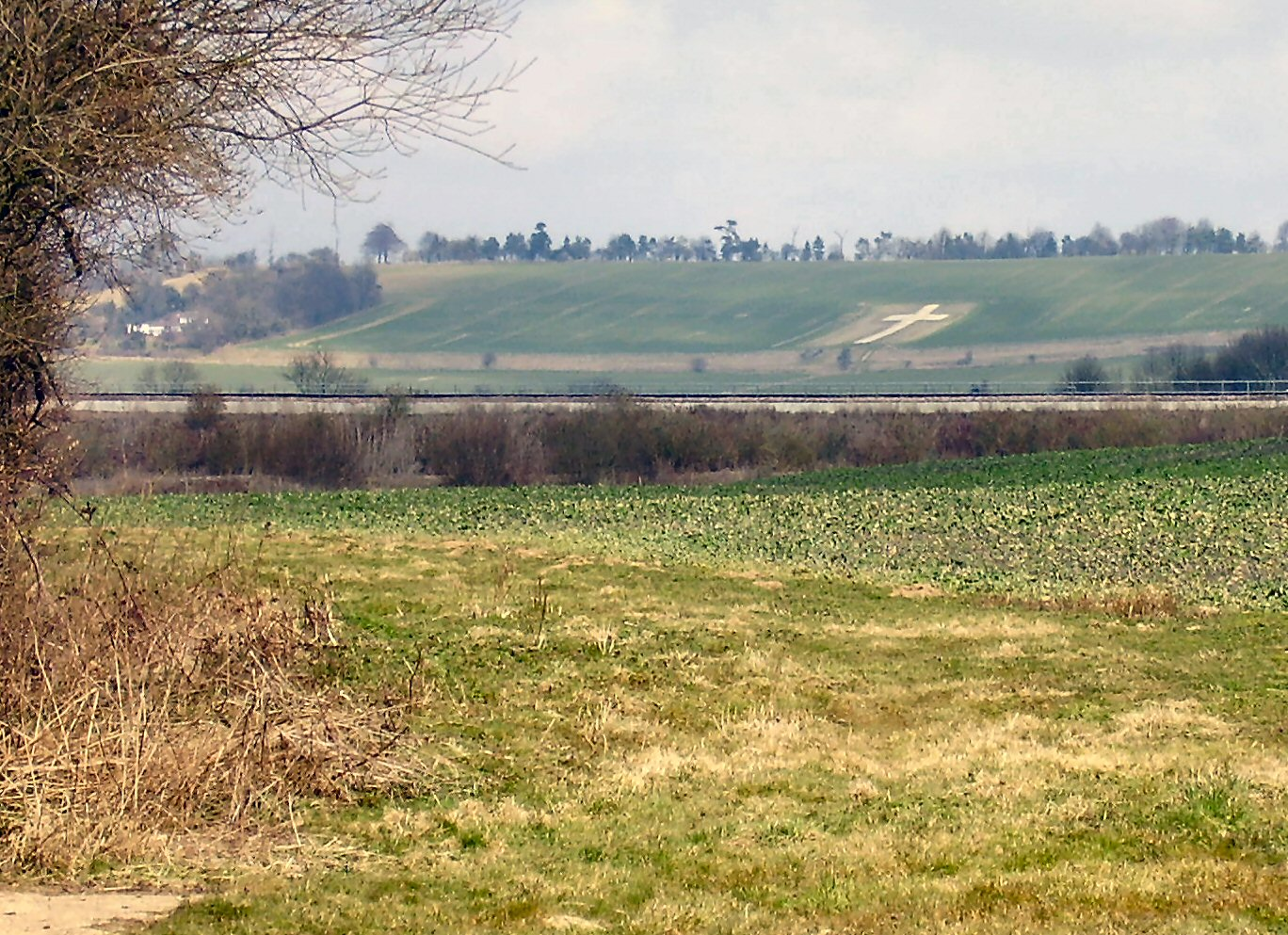
Lenham Cross on the south face of the North Downs

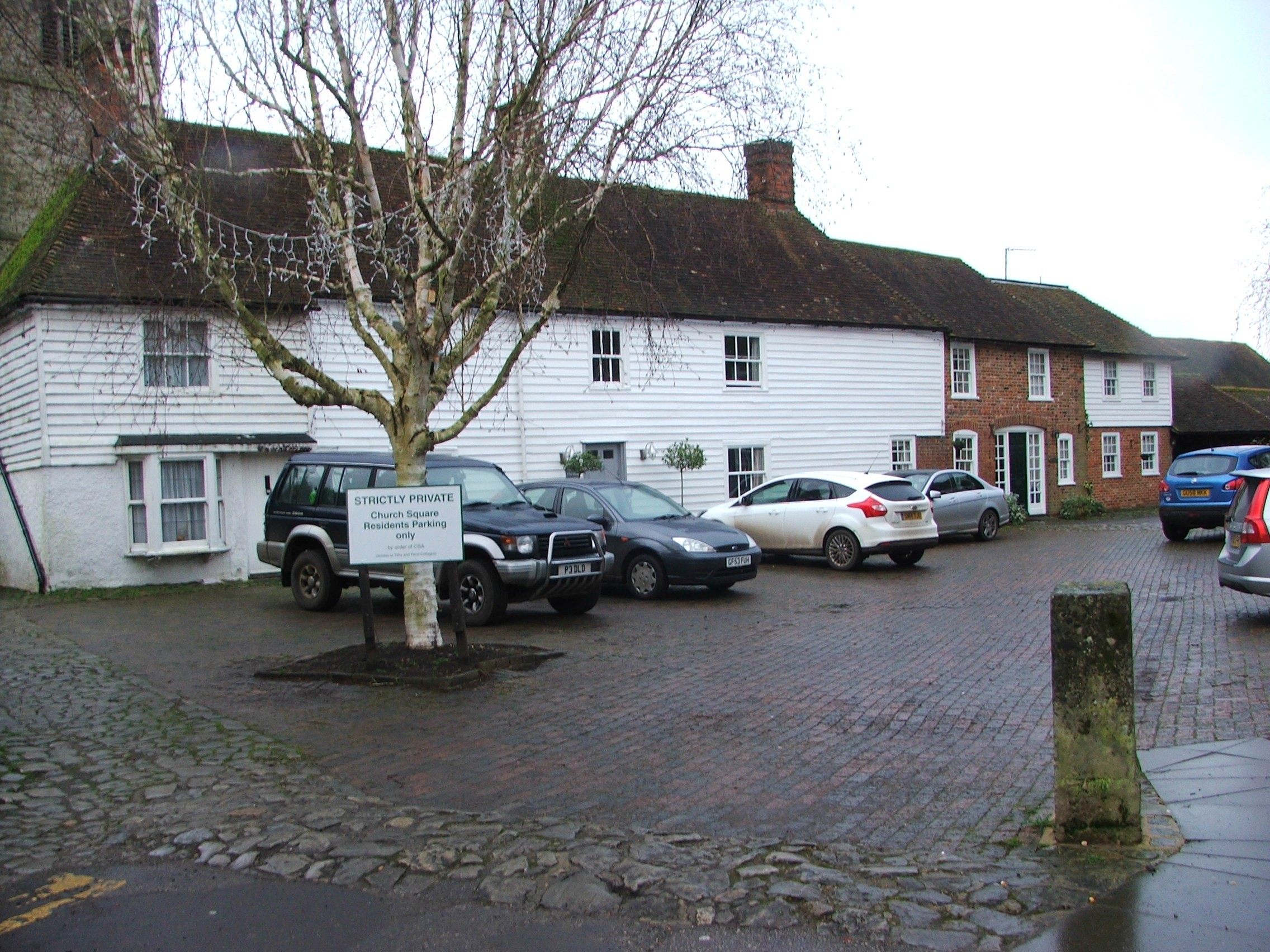
Church Square, Lenham

Lenham is a market village and civil parish in the Maidstone district, in Kent, England, situated on the southern edge of the North Downs, 9 miles (14 km) east of Maidstone. The picturesque square in the village has two public houses (one of which is a hotel), a couple of restaurants, and a tea-room. The parish has a population of 3,370 according to the 2011 Census.

Lenham railway station is on the Maidstone East Line.

The village is at the main source of the Great Stour and the Stour Valley Walk starts here, heading to Ashford and on to Canterbury and the English Channel near Sandwich. It is also the source of the River Len, which flows in a westerly direction to join the River Medway at Maidstone.

== History ==
In 850, Æthelwulf, King of Wessex, granted Ealhhere, ealdorman of Kent, a large estate of forty hides at Lenham.

Mentioned in the Domesday Book of 1086, Lenham market dates back to 1088, when the village was an important crossroad settlement. The manor of Lenham belonged to St Augustine's Abbey, Canterbury, until the dissolution of the monasteries when it reverted to the Crown. Queen Elizabeth I awarded the manor to her chief courtier, William Cecil, Lord Burleigh. It then passed through ownership of the Wilford, Montagu, Hamilton and Best families.

Technically the fact that Lenham is allowed a market, makes it a town but the community have always desired to maintain its village status.

The High Street has a number of listed buildings.

Mary Honywood was born in Lenham. When she died in Essex at the age of 93, she had 367 living descendants.

The Pilgrims' Way/North Downs Way passes along the downland ridge to the north of Lenham. Between this ridge and the village lies a 200-foot (61 m) chalk cross carved into the scarp slope. First constructed in 1922, to remember those who fell in the Great War, and fully restored in 1994, the Lenham Cross now commemorates the dead of both world wars. To avoid its use as a navigation aid by the Luftwaffe, the cross was filled in between 1939 and May 1945.

On 27 August 1950, Lenham, along with the village of Harvel, was one of the signal relay points (between Calais and London) of the first-ever live television pictures from the continent.

In 2020, Co-op staff member, Jo Bate, won Sales Assistant of the Year for her excellent service during the COVID-19 pandemic.

== Amenities ==
The parish church of St Mary was rebuilt in the 14th century after fire had destroyed its predecessor. It and the nearby Tithe Barn are Grade I listed buildings. From 1876 to his death in 1903, the vicar of the church was Charles Nepean, who played for Oxford University A.F.C. in the 1874 FA Cup Final. Nepean also played cricket for Middlesex.

There is a primary school, Lenham Primary and a secondary school, The Lenham School, at Lenham. A pair of cottages in Lenham had to be demolished to make way for the Channel Tunnel Rail Link (Maidstone Line). They were dismantled and re-erected at the Museum of Kent Life, Sandling.

A local kit car firm GKD Sports Cars has its workshop based in Lenham and its main base in Boughton Monchelsea.

Also in Lenham is a pharmacy, famous as the discovery site of a sixth-century Saxon warrior’s body and weapons. The village has a website dedicated to recording the village's cultural heritage. Lenham Meadows Trust works to protect open spaces in the area. The church is supported by the Friends of St Mary's. The village also has a film club.

Lenham is also a home of HAMS Productions, amateur dramatic society, a diverse group that serves community since 2016. HAMS Productions' yearly pantomimes are gaining popularity. It also had two successful serious plays, written and directed by a local author. HAMS Productions has around a hundred of members and is located in Lenham Community Centre.

== Heathlands ==
Maidstone Borough Council has proposed a garden village called Heathlands in their Local Plan adopted in 2024.

== Freedom of the Parish ==
The following people and military units have received the Freedom of the Parish of Lenham.

=== Military Units ===
- The Royal Electrical and Mechanical Engineers: 23 June 2024.

== See also ==
- Listed buildings in Lenham
