= Indigo 3000 =

JC Indigo 3000
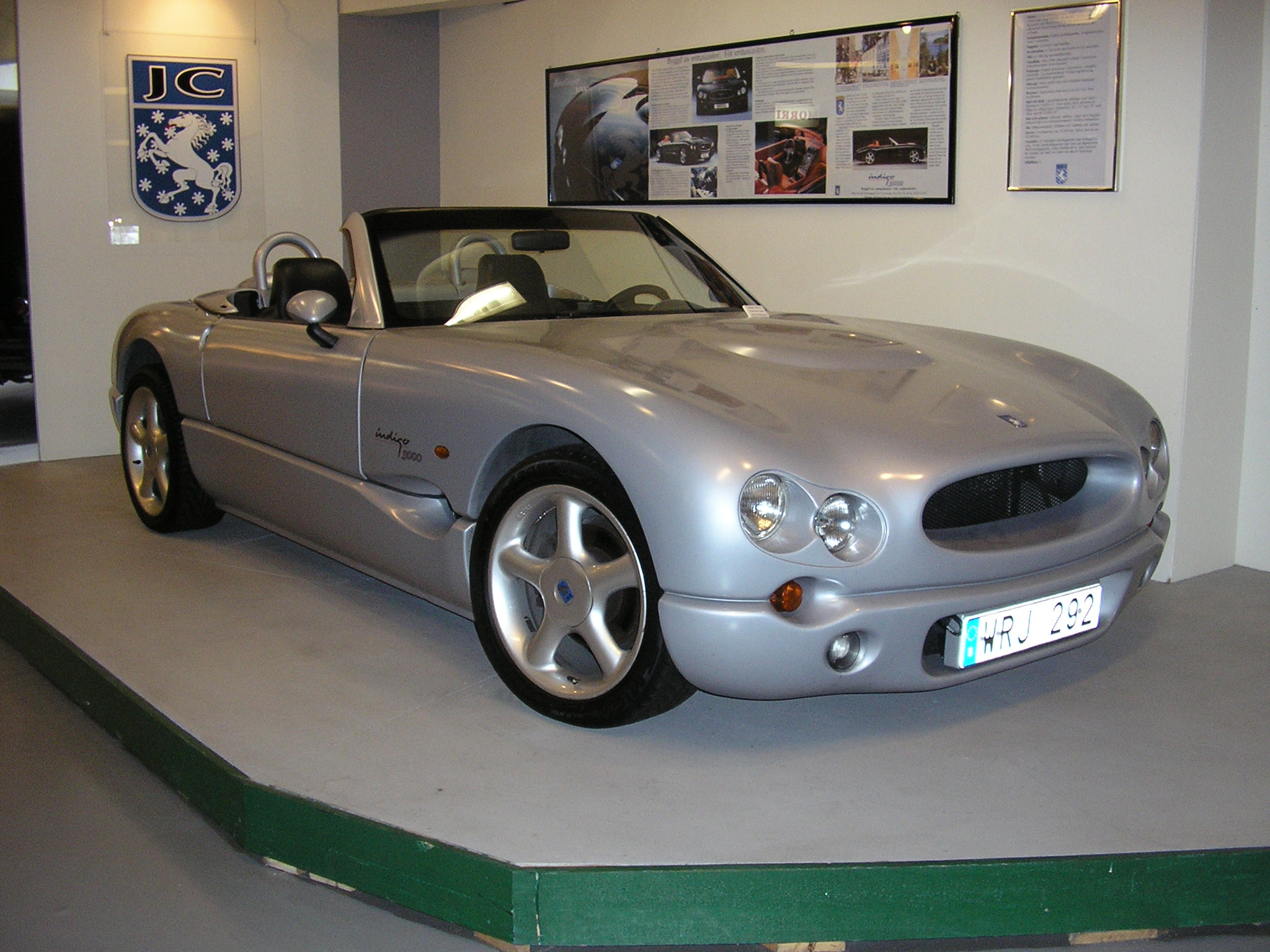
- 1998 JC Indigo 3000

Overview
- Manufacturer: Jösse Car
- Production: 1996–2000; 44 produced
- Designer: Hans Philip Zackau

Body and chassis
- Class: Sports car (S)
- Body style: 2-door roadster

Powertrain
- Engine: 3.0 L Volvo I6
- Transmission: 5-speed manual

Dimensions
- Wheelbase: 2,520 mm (99.2 in)
- Length: 4,300 mm (169.3 in)
- Width: 1,760 mm (69.3 in)
- Height: 1,140 mm (44.9 in)
- Curb weight: ~1,000 kg (2,205 lb)

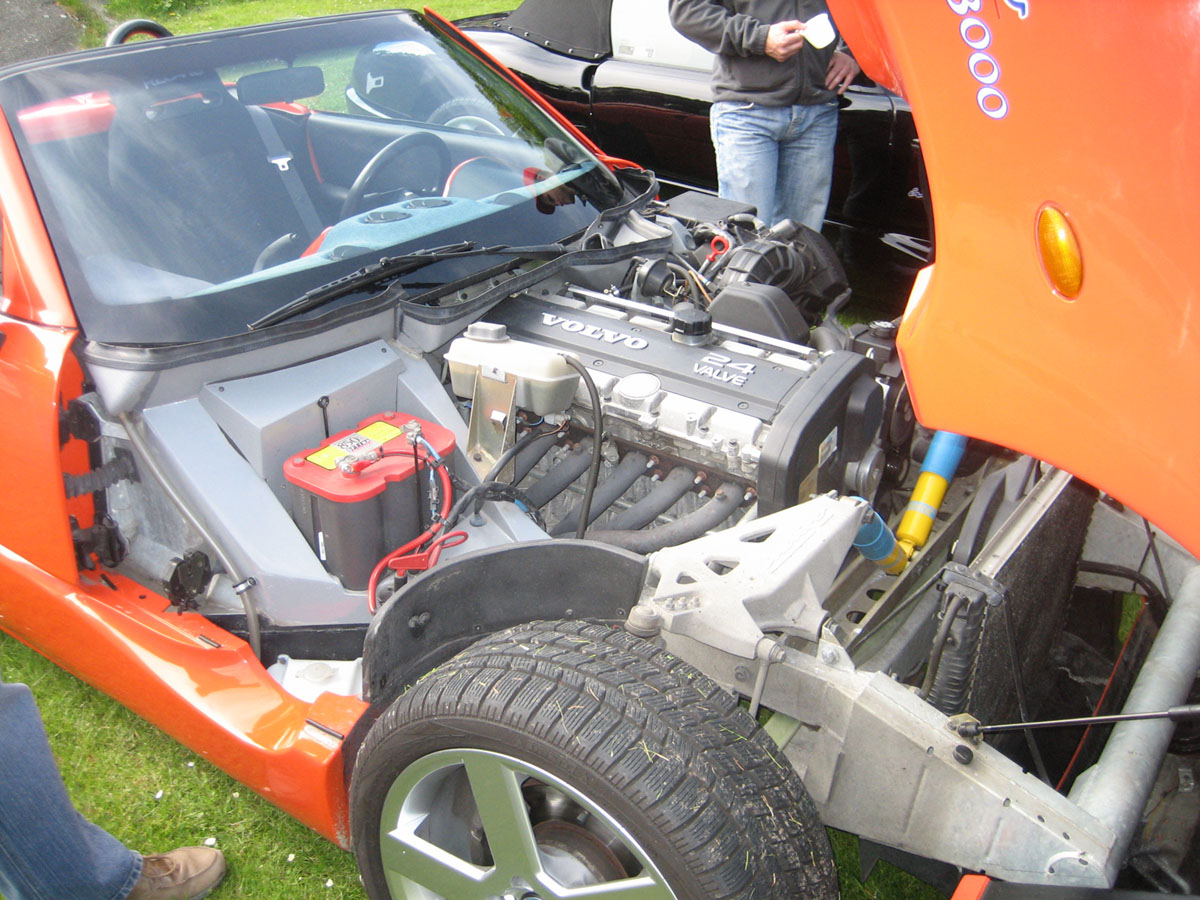
Engine with original Volvo valve cover

The Indigo 3000 is a Swedish sports car produced by Jösse Car from 1996 to 2000. 44 working cars were produced and it was the only car manufactured by Jösse Car before they folded. It was designed by Hans Philip Zackau, who also did work on the Volvo 850.

The Indigo 3000 is a two-seat, rear-wheel drive roadster powered by a 3.0 L, all aluminum, Volvo straight-six engine which is connected to a Volvo 960 gearbox driving the rear wheels. It could accelerate from 0-60 mph (0-97 km/h) in 6.5 seconds and has a claimed top speed of 250 km/h (155 mph). It was marketed as an affordable sports car and first retailed for 250000 SEK (without options). The body is of composite panels attached to a space frame. The front suspension is of the maker's own design but the rear unit is from Volvo using a composite transverse spring. The gas tank came from the Saab 900, the base of the seats are from the Volvo S40, the steering column is from the Volvo 850 and the rear suspension is from the Volvo 960.
