= List of churches in Kent =

This is a list of churches in Kent, a county in South East Region of England. There is a mixture of Christian denominations.

== East Kent ==
- Ashford - St Teresa's Roman Catholic Church
- Ashford (South) - St Simon Stock Roman Catholic Church
- Bapchild - St Lawrence Church
- Blean - Favour House Church
- Blean - St Cosmus and St Damian's Church
- Bobbing - St Bartholomew Church
- Borden - St Peter & St Paul Church
- Bradstowe - Shrine of Our Lady
- Bredgar - St John the Baptist Church
- Brenzett - St Eanswith's Church
- Brookland - St Augustine's Church
- Canterbury - St Mary Bredin Church
- Canterbury - Canterbury Baptist Church
- Canterbury - Cathedral and Metropolitical Church of Christ at Canterbury

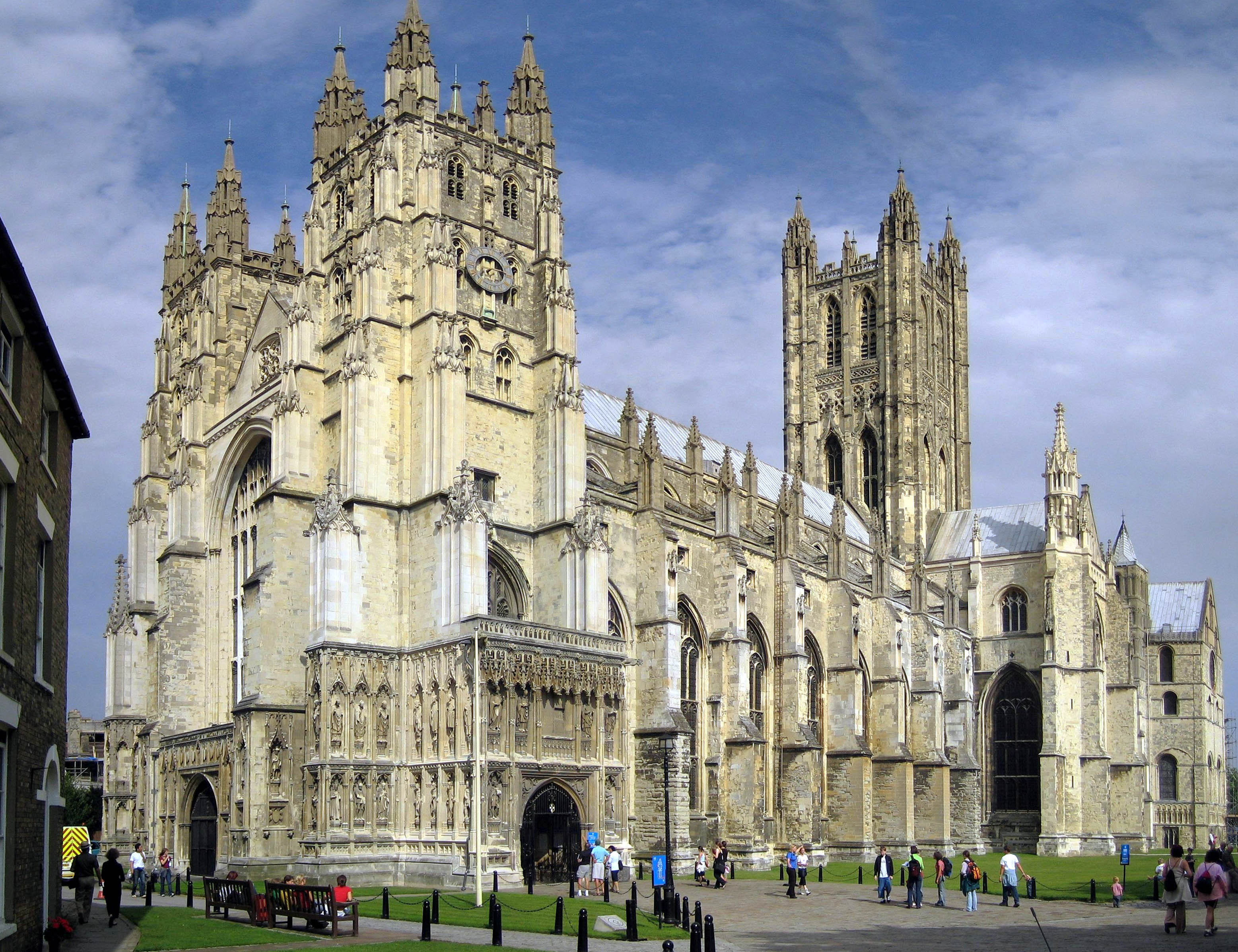
Canterbury Cathedral, Canterbury

- Canterbury - The City Church
- Canterbury - Holy Cross Church
- Canterbury - St Augustines Church
- Canterbury - St Dunstan's Church
- Canterbury - St Stephen's Parish Church
- Canterbury - St Martin's and St Paul's Church
- Canterbury - St Thomas of Canterbury Roman Catholic Church
- Canterbury - Shrine of Our Lady Church
- Dover - St Mary's Church
- Dover - St Paul's RC
- Eastchurch - All Saints Church
- Faversham - St Mary of Charity, Faversham
- Faversham - St Catherine's Church, Preston-next-Faversham
- Folkestone - St Mary and St Eanswythe's Church
- Hartlip - St Michael & All Angels Church
- Harty - St Thomas the Apostle
- Herne Bay - Christ Church
- Herne Bay - St Mary's Church
- Hernhill - St Michael's Church
- Iwade - All Saints Church
- Lower Halstow - St Margaret of Antioch Church
- Lynsted - St Peter & St Paul Church
- Manston, Kent - St Catherine's Church
- Margate - Holy Trinity Church
- Milton Regis - Holy Trinity Church
- Murston - All Saints Church
- Newington - St Mary The Virgin Church
- Ospringe - Church of St Peter and St Paul
- Queenborough - Holy Trinity Church
- Rainham - St Margaret's Church
- Rodmersham - St Nicholas' Church
- Seasalter - St Alphege Church
- Seasalter - Seasalter Christian Centre (linked to St Alphege Church)
- Sittingbourne - St. Michael the Archangel Church
- Sittingbourne - St Mary's Church
- Sittingbourne - Wesley Methodist Church
- Sittingbourne - United Reformed Church
- Sittingbourne - Catholic Church of the Sacred Heart
- Sittingbourne - Holy Trinity Church
- Stockbury - St Mary Magdalene Church
- Teynham - St Mary's Church
- Tonge - St Giles Church
- Tunstall - St John the Baptist Church
- Upchurch - St Mary The Virgin Church
- Walmer - Old St Mary's Church
- Walmer - St Saviour's Church
- Walmer - St Mary's Church
- Warehorne - St Matthew's Church
- Westgate - St James' Parish Church
- Whitfield - Church of St. Peter
- Whitstable - Whitstable Baptist Church
- Whitstable - The Harbour Church
- Whitstable - St Alphege Church
- Whitstable - St Andrews Church
- Whitstable - St John's Wesleyan Methodist Church
- Whitstable - St Peter's Church
- Whitstable - United Reform
- Whitstable - Catholic Church of Our Lady of the Immaculate Conception
- Wye - Church of St Gregory and St. Martin

== West Kent ==
- Addington, Kent - St. Margarets
- Allhallows - All Saints
- Allington - St Nicholas
- Aylesford - St Peter and St Paul
- Barming - St. Margaret's

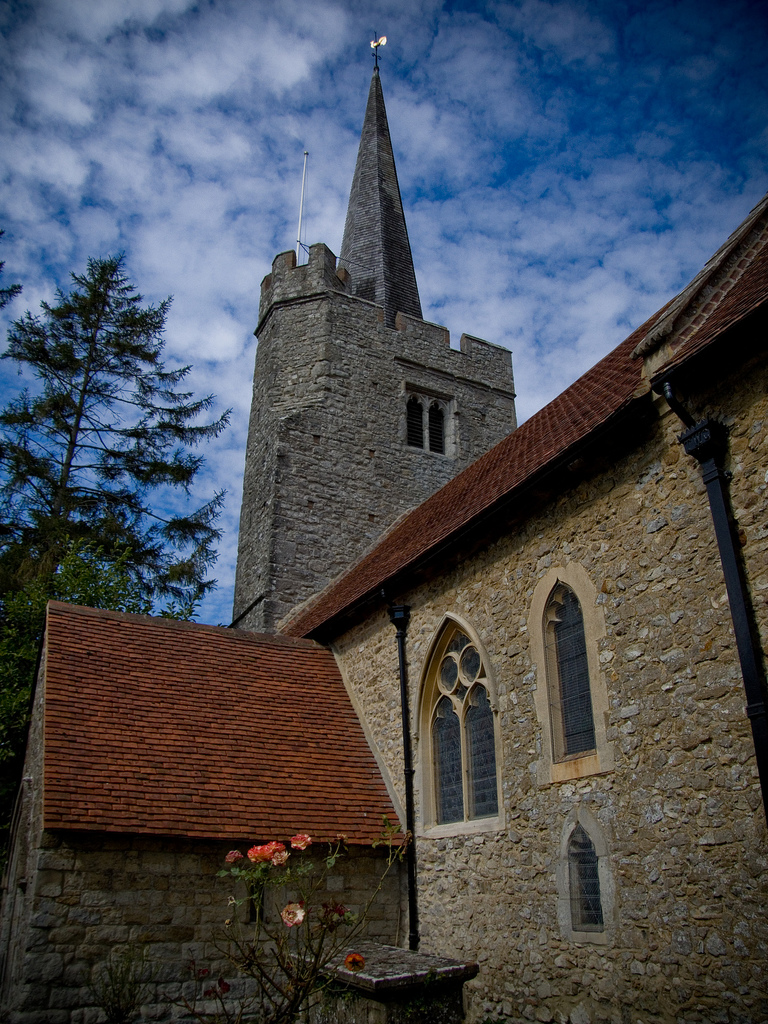
St. Margaret's Church, Barming

- Birling - All Saints
- Borough Green - Church of the Good Shepherd
- Borough Green - Borough Green Baptist Church
- Borough Green - St Joseph's Church Borough Green
- Brenchley - All Saints Church
- Cliffe - St Helen's
- Chatham - Chatham Unitarian Church
- Chatham - Christ Church, Luton, Chatham
- Chatham - The Church of Christ the King
- Chatham - Enon Baptist Church
- Chatham - Evangelical Church
- Chatham - Dockyard Garrison Chapel
- Chatham - The Kings Church Medway
- Chatham - St. George's Chapel
- Chatham - St. Marys Island Church
- Chatham - St. Michael's R.C Church
- Chatham - St. Paul with All Saints
- Chatham - St. Phillips & St. James
- Chatham - St. Simon Stock R.C Church
- Chatham - St. Stephen's
- Chatham - St. William's
- Chatham - United Reformed Church
- Chatham - Walderslade Baptist Church
- Coxheath - Holy Trinity Church
- Cuxton - St. Michael and All Saints
- East Malling - St. James
- Frindsbury - All Saints
- Gillingham - Our Lady of Gillingham Roman Catholic Church
- Gillingham - St. Augustine's Church
- Gillingham - St. Mark's Church
- Gillingham - KingsTreasure Church, Scout Hut
- Gillingham - St. Mary Magdalene Church
- Gillingham - Wigmore Evangelical Free Church
- Grain - St. James
- Gravesend - St Pauls United Reformed Church
- Halling - Halling Baptist Church
- Horsmonden - St Margaret's Church
- Larkfield - Holy Trinity
- Lamberhurst - St Mary's Church
- Leybourne - St. Peter & St. Paul's
- Maidstone - All Saints Church, Maidstone
- Maidstone - Boxley Road Evangelical
- Maidstone - Church Of Jesus Christ of Latter Day Saints
- Maidstone - Holy Cross Church
- Maidstone - Holy Trinity Church - No longer in ecclesiastical use
- Maidstone - Jubilee Church
- Maidstone - Liberty Church
- Maidstone - Maidstone Baptist Church
- Maidstone - Roman Catholic Parish of Saint Francis Church
- Maidstone - St. Luke's Church
- Maidstone - St. Martin's Church
- Maidstone - St Michael and All Angels Church
- Markbeech - Holy Trinity Church
- Matfield - St Luke's Church
- Northfleet - Dover Road United Reformed Church
- Offham - St Michael & All Angels' Church
- Otford - Church of The Most Holy Trinity (Catholic)
- Otford - St Bartholomew's
- Rainham - Granary Evangelical Church (Rainham Evangelical Church)
- Rochester - Cathedral Church of Christ and the Blessed Virgin Mary
- Rochester - St. Bartholomew's Chapel
- Rochester - St. Justus
- Rochester - St. John Fisher Catholic Church
- Rochester - St. Margaret's Church, Rochester
- Rochester - St. Nicholas - Former church, now the offices of the Board of Education of the Diocese of Rochester.
- Rochester - St. Peter's Church, Rochester
- Rochester - Vines United Reformed Church
- Royal Tunbridge Wells - Church of King Charles the Martyr
- Royal Tunbridge Wells - St. Mark's Church
- Sevenoaks - St Nicholas'
- Sevenoaks - St Luke's
- Sevenoaks, Kippington - St Mary's
- Sevenoaks, Kippington - Christ Church United Reformed Church
- Sevenoaks - St John the Baptist
- Sevenoaks, Riverhead - St Mary the Virgin

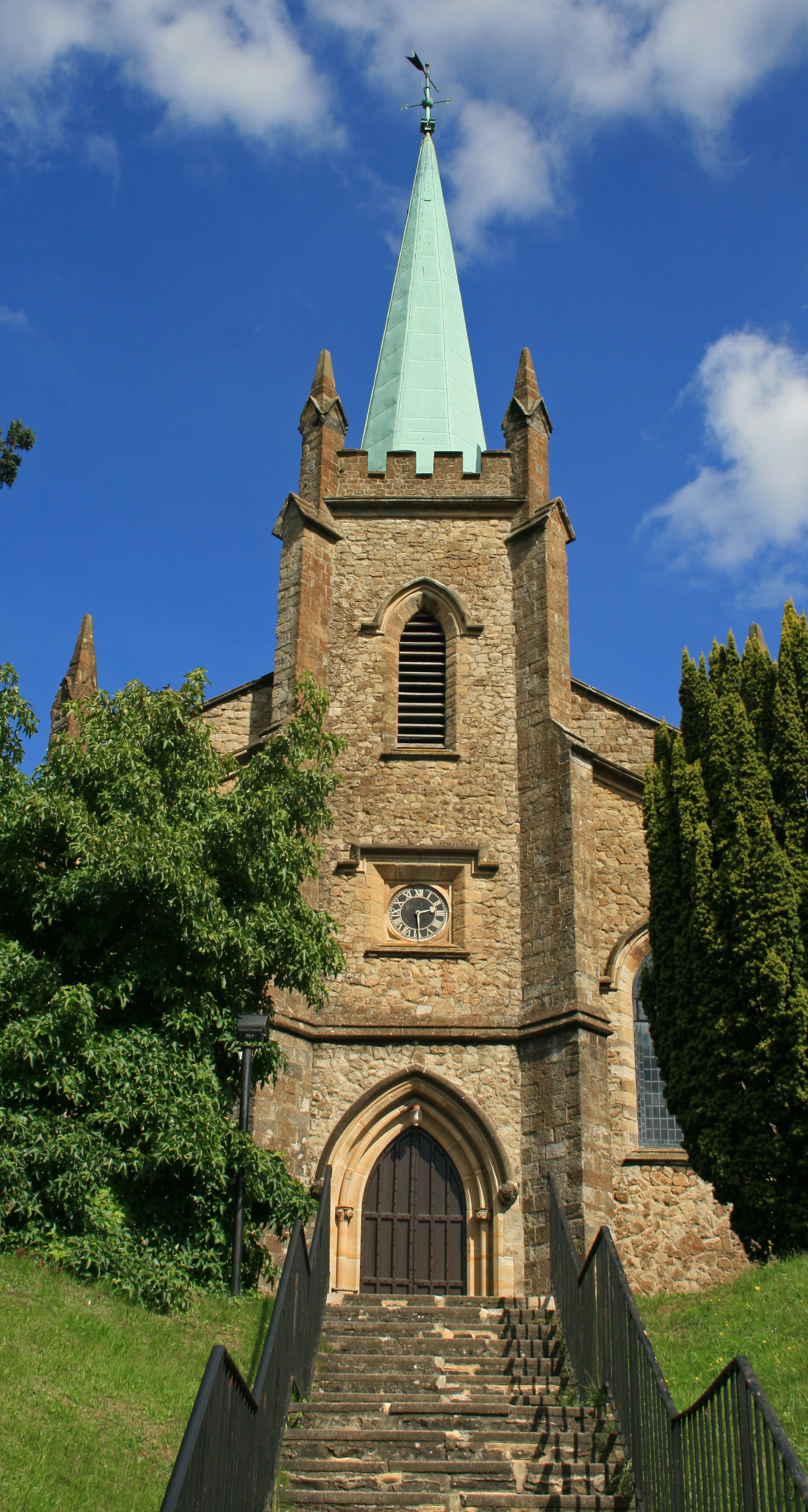
St Mary the Virgin, Riverhead, Kent

- Sevenoaks - St Thomas of Canterbury Roman Catholic Church
- Sevenoaks - Hope Church
- Sevenoaks - The Sevenoaks United Reformed Church
- Sevenoaks - The Savenoaks Baptist Church
- Sevenoaks - The Sevenoaks Evangelical Church
- Snodland - All Saints Church
- Snodland - Christ Church
- Staplehurst - All Saints Church
- Teston - St Peter's and St Paul's Church
- Tonbridge - St. Stephen's Parish Church
- Tonbridge - St. Peter & St Paul's Parish Church
- Tonbridge - St. Saviour's Church
- Tonbridge - St. Phillip's Church
- Tonbridge - St. Andrew's Church
- Tonbridge - Tonbridge Baptist Church
- Tonbridge - Christ Church, Tonbridge
- Tonbridge - St. Eanswythe's Chapel | Mission Church
- Tonbridge - Church on the Way
- Tonbridge - Hillsong Church London
- Trottiscliffe - St. Peter and St Paul's
- Vigo - Vigo Church
- Walderslade - St Philip & St James
- West Farleigh - All Saints' Church
- West Kingsdown - St Bernadette's Catholic Church
- West Kingsdown - St Edmund King and Martyr
- West Kingsdown - West Kingsdown Baptist Church
- West Malling - St. Mary's Church
- Wormshill - St. Giles
- Wrotham - St. George's Church
- Yalding - St Peter and St Paul's Church
- Yalding - Yalding Baptist Church

== See also ==
- List of places of worship in Sevenoaks District
- List of places of worship in Tonbridge and Malling
- List of places of worship in Tunbridge Wells (borough)
