= St Peter's Church, Maidstone =

Parish church in Maidstone, Kent, England

Coordinates: 51.27276°N 0.51601°E

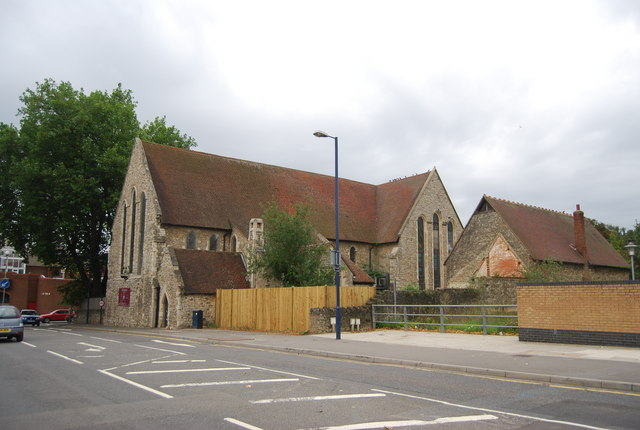

- Location within Kent
- OS grid reference: TQ 75598 55633
- Location: Maidstone, Kent
- Country: England
- Denomination: Anglican

Architecture
- Functional status: Redundant
- Heritage designation: Grade II*
- Designated: 30 July 1951
- Completed: 13th century

St Peter's Church, Maidstone is a redundant Anglican church in Maidstone, Kent, England. It is a Grade II* listed building.

== Building ==
St Peter's Church is located between the River Medway, and the Medway Valley line.

The exterior is in a simple, Early English style.

== History ==
The building started life as the chapel for a hospital (dedicated to SS Peter and Paul called the Newark of Maidstone) for pilgrims crossing the river, travelling to Canterbury. It was founded by Boniface, Archbishop of Canterbury in 1260. In 1395, the hospital was merged with the new foundation of All Saints, Maidstone. The chapel became redundant after the Reformation and was sold to Lord Cobham, the chapel then had various secular uses. It was restored and enlarged in 1836-7 by John Whichcord Sr., was consecrated in 1839, and gained its own parish in 1840.

The church was restored in 1905, when the north vestry complex was built.

St Michael and All Angels Church, was built to serve Maidstone's rapidly expanding suburbs on the western side of the River Medway after St. Peter's Church was proving to be far too small. St. Peter's Church was also a long way from where the new districts of Westborough and Fant were being built.

It was restored again in 1951.

The building was converted for secular use in the early 21st century, and is currently used as nursery.

== See also ==
- List of churches in Kent
- Maidstone
