= All Saints Church, Staplehurst =

Coordinates: 51.1582°N 0.5531°E

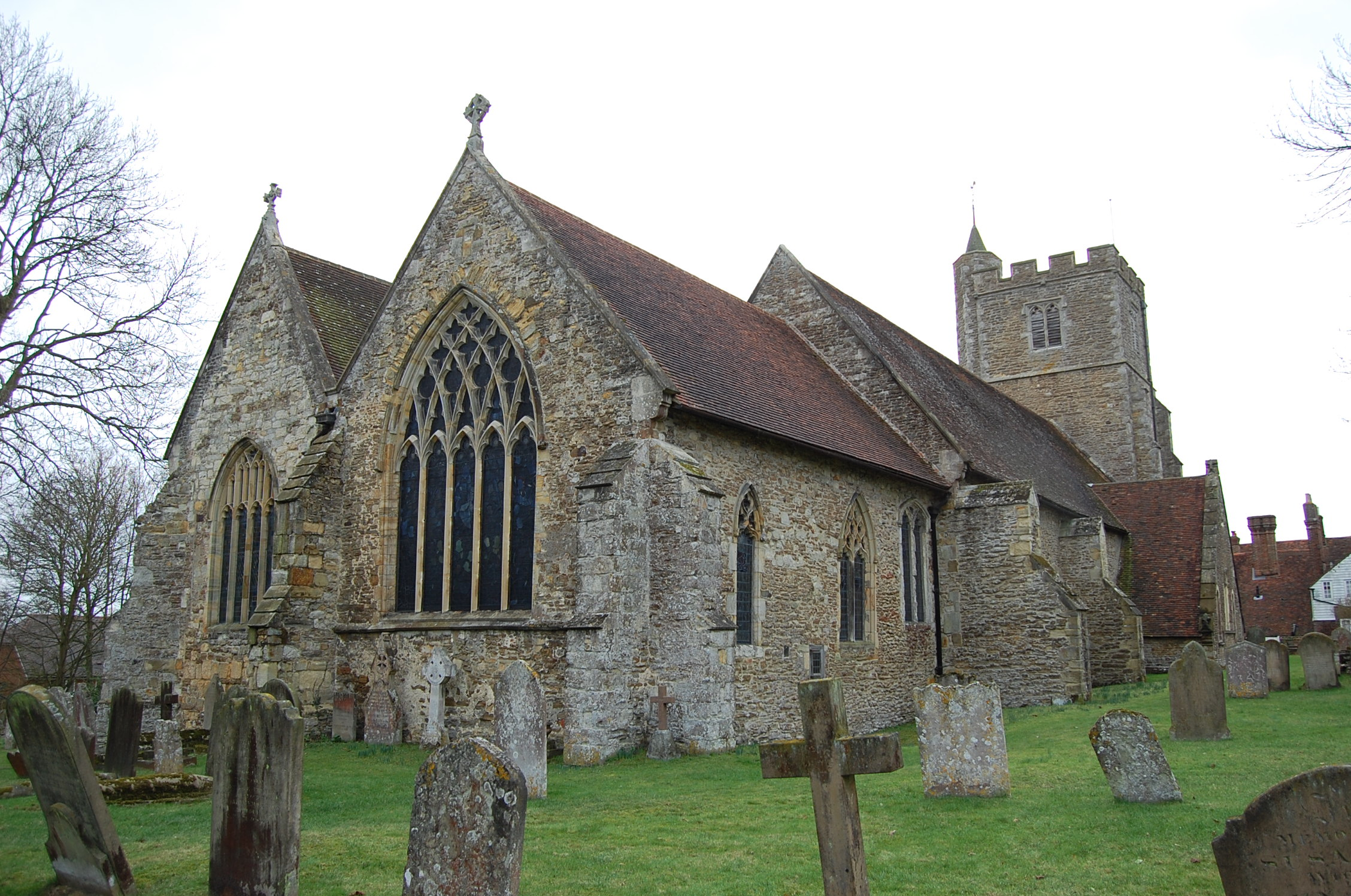

- Location within Kent
- OS grid reference: TQ 78633 42981
- Location: Staplehurst, Kent
- Country: England
- Denomination: Anglican
- Website: allsaintsstaplehurst.co.uk

History
- Status: Parish church

Architecture
- Functional status: Active
- Heritage designation: Grade I
- Designated: 23 May 1967
- Completed: Late 12th century

Administration
- Province: Canterbury
- Diocese: Canterbury
- Archdeaconry: Maidstone
- Deanery: Weald
- Parish: Staplehurst

All Saints Church is a parish church in Staplehurst, Kent, England. It is a Grade I listed building.

== Building ==
The church is situated at the south end of the village, on the east side of the High Street, a Roman Road now designated as the A229.

One of the notable features of the church is the south door, which is thought to date to the 12th century, and displays some very fine early ironwork. The church features a ring of ten bells, the oldest cast in 1605 and the most recent being two cast in 1996, when a new steel frame was installed. The current church clock dates from 1888. Owen Jennings of Cox & Barnard, a stained glass designing and manufacturing firm based in Hove, made six windows for the church in 1952. Those in the north chapel (one single-light and one two-light window) and the north aisle (three two-light windows) have heraldic badges and emblems, and another two-light window in the north aisle has a Nativity scene.

== History ==
It was founded in the 12th century. The church was mainly built in the 12th and 13th centuries, and the West Tower was commenced about 1425.

== Gallery ==
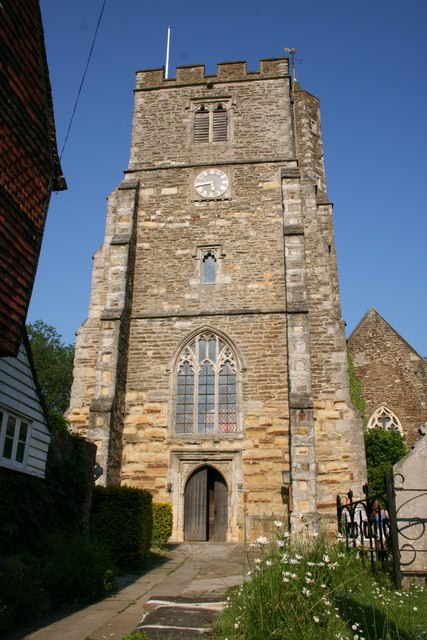
The tower

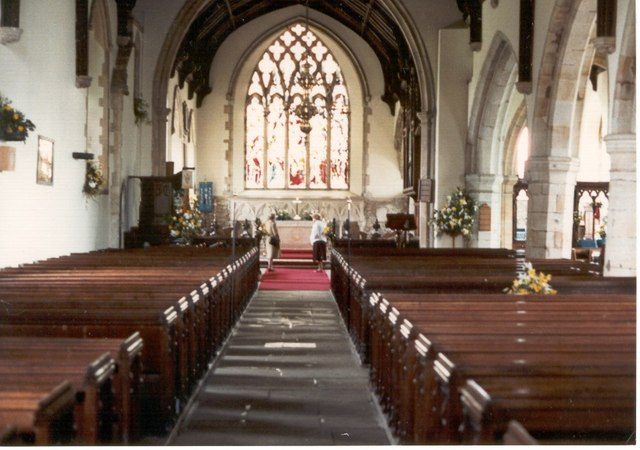
Church interior

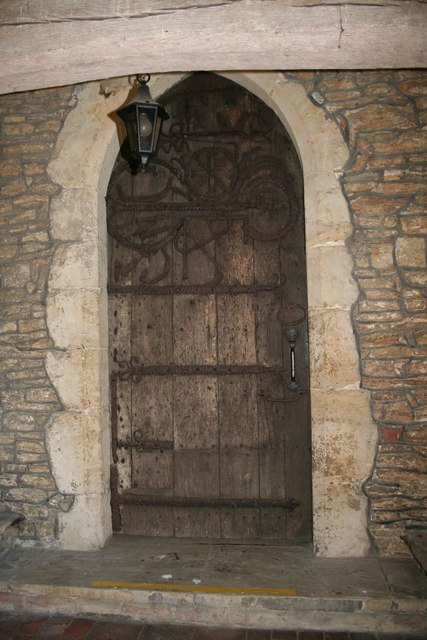
Saxon Door

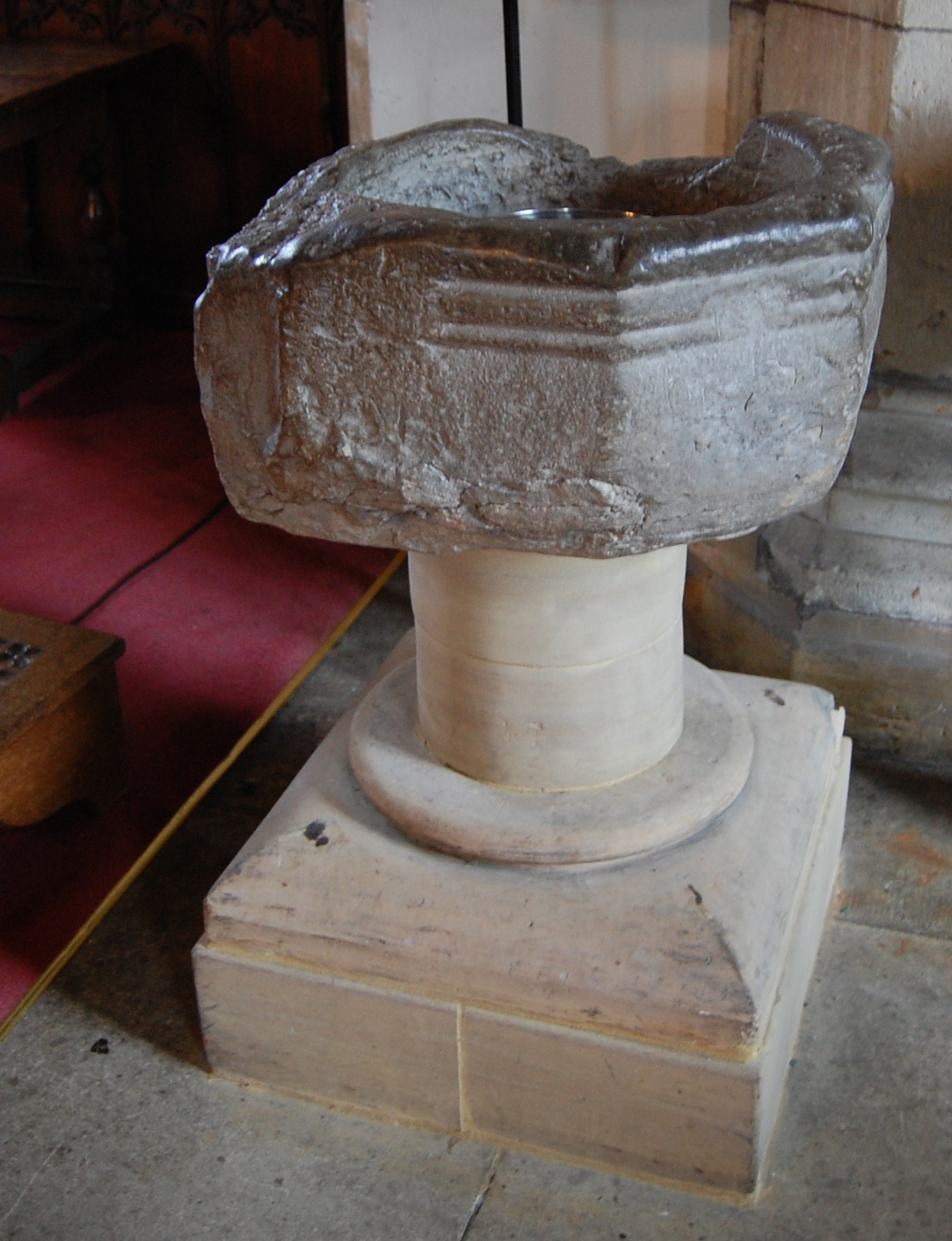
The font

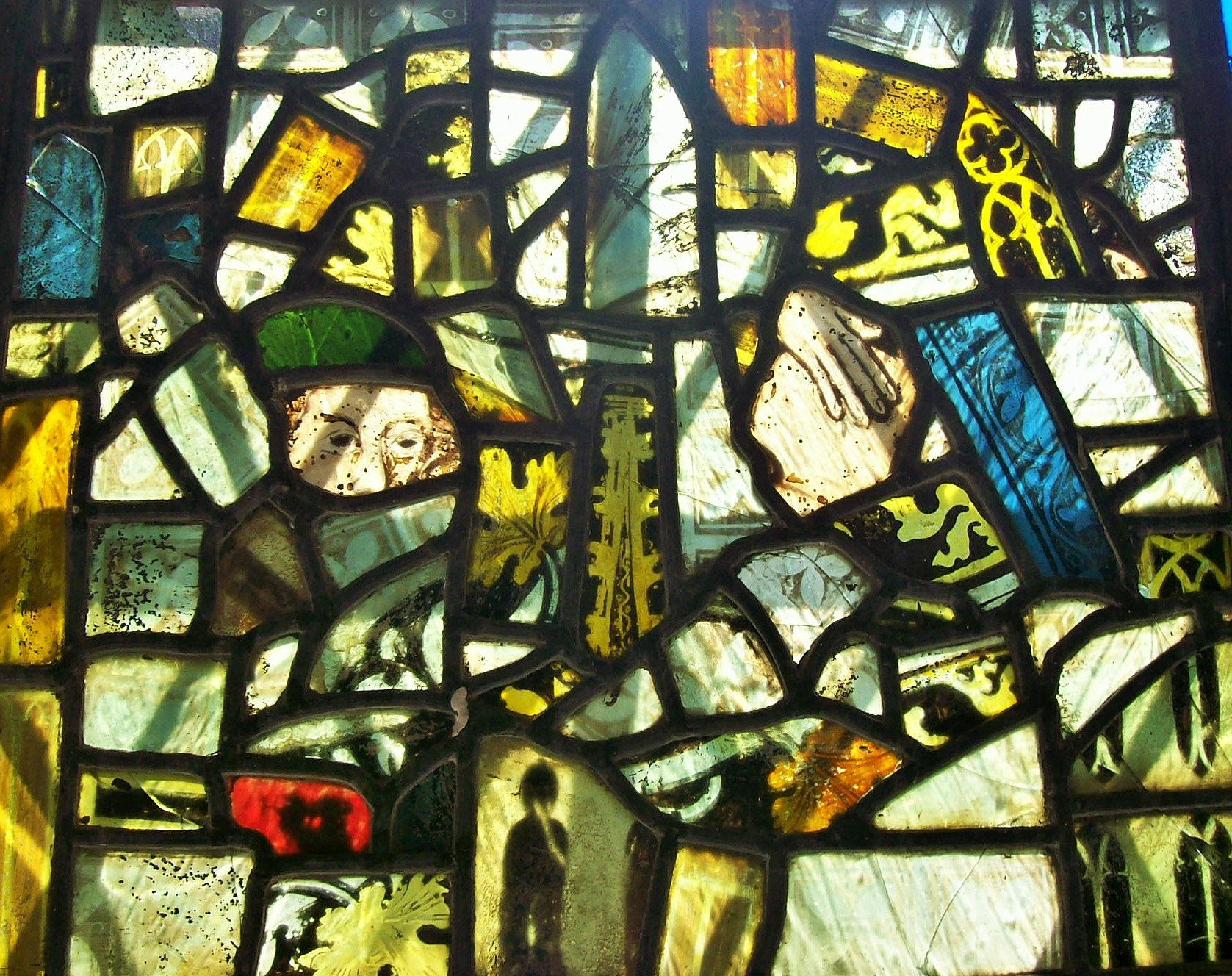
Fragments of medieval glass

== See also ==
- Staplehurst
- List of churches in Kent
