= St Margaret's Church, Horsmonden =

Parish church in the village of Horsmonden, Kent, England

Coordinates: 51.11696°N 0.43293°E

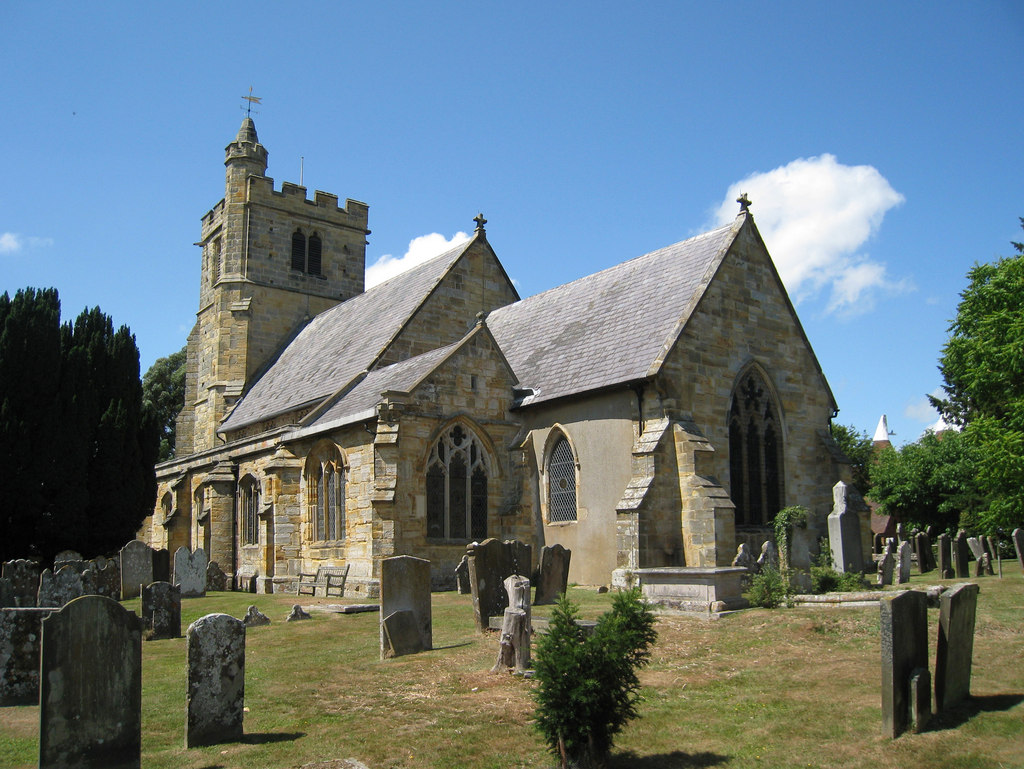

- Location within Kent
- OS grid reference: TQ 70383 38112
- Location: Horsmonden, Kent
- Country: England
- Denomination: Anglican
- Website: stmargaretshorsmonden.org.uk

History
- Status: Parish church

Architecture
- Functional status: Active
- Heritage designation: Grade I
- Designated: 20 October 1954
- Completed: 14th century

Administration
- Province: Canterbury
- Diocese: Rochester
- Archdeaconry: Tonbridge
- Deanery: Paddock Wood
- Parish: Horsmonden

St Margaret's Church is a parish church in the village of Horsmonden, Kent, England. It is a Grade I listed building.

== Building ==
St Margaret's Church is set in a farmyard, some distance from Horsmonden.

The building is constructed of sandstone and roofed in Welsh slate, which replaced a former roof of clay tiles in the late 19th century. During the 18th century the roof was covered in wooden shingles.

== History ==
The building of the current church was started around 1260, on the site of a former Norman building which dated back to around 1100. Henry de Grofhurst, rector from 1311 until his death in 1361, was mostly responsible for building St Margaret's Church. He is memorialised in a monumental brass in the centre of the chancel.

== Burials and memorials ==
On the south wall is a memorial bust to the 19th century inventor, John Read, responsible for the round oast-house, the stomach pump and a tobacco enema.

== Gallery ==
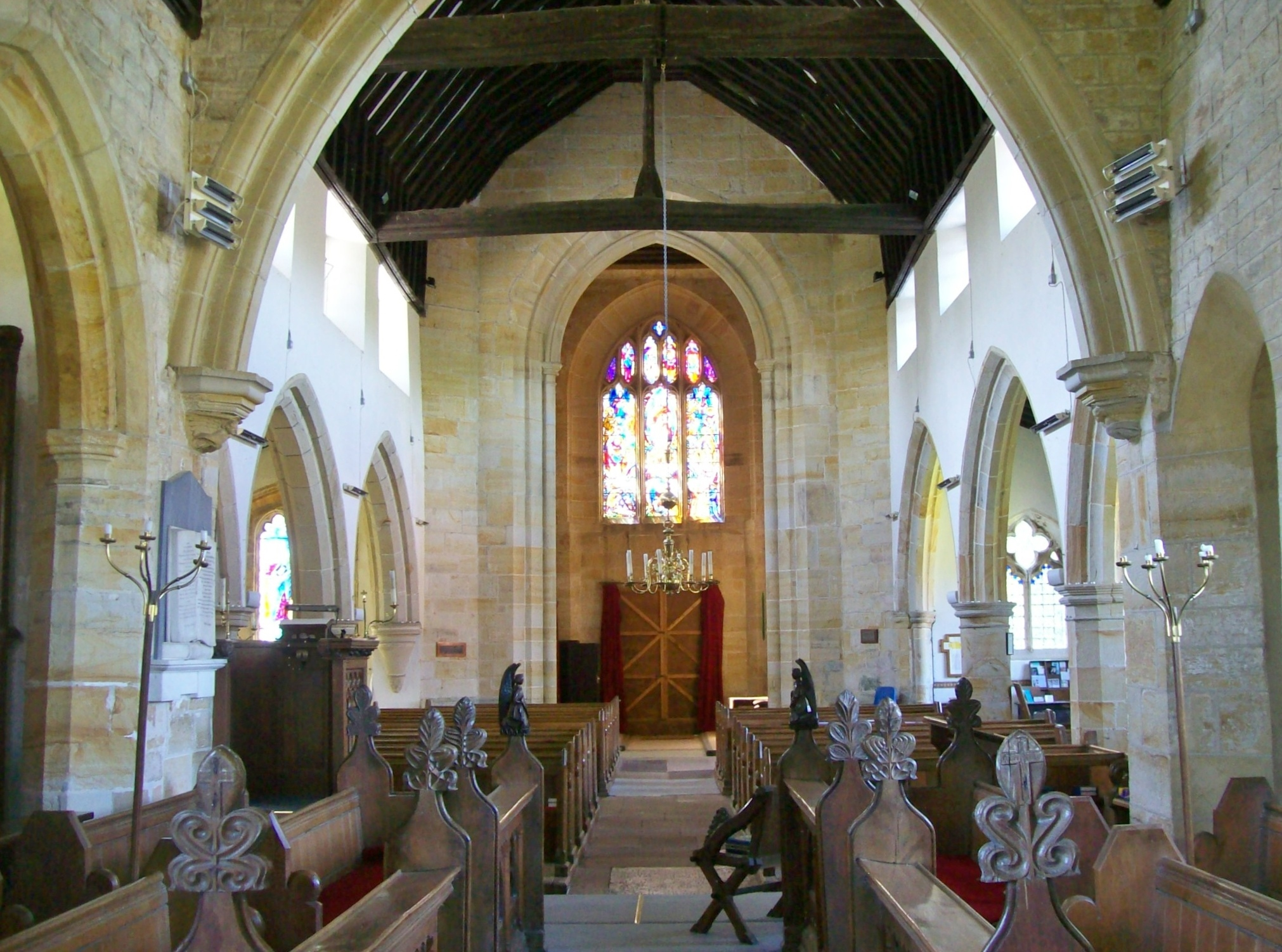
The church interior

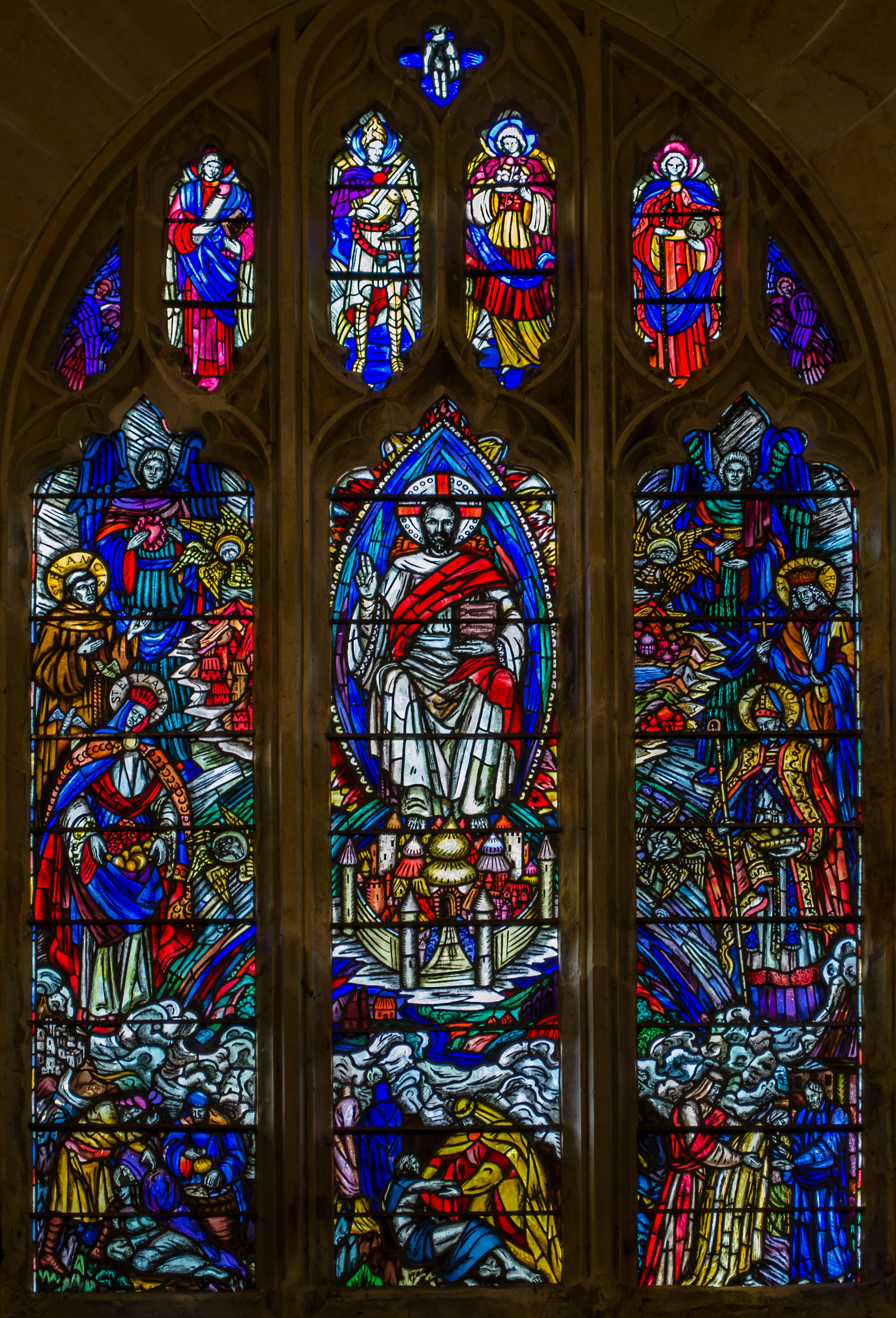
West window, depicting Christ in majesty

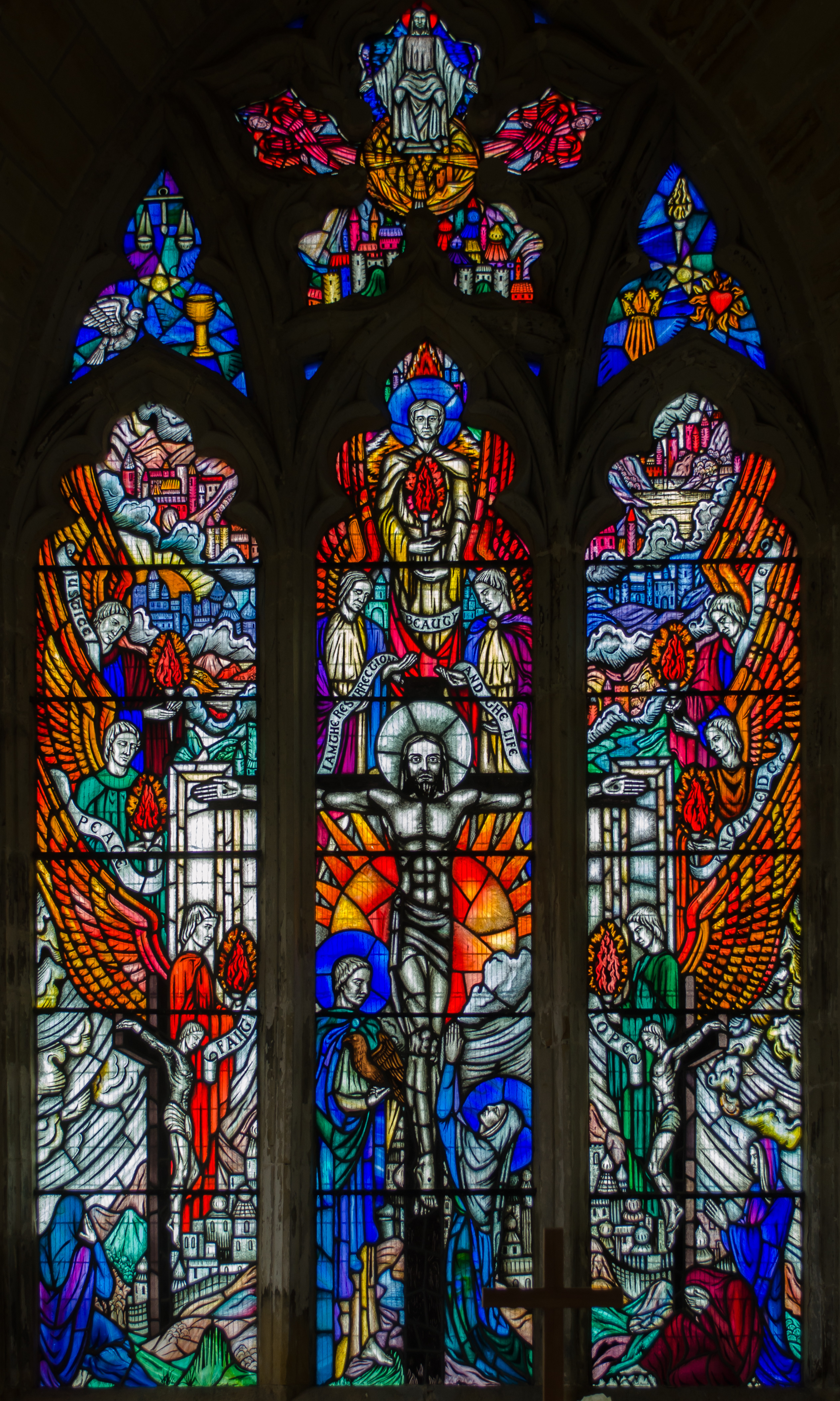
East window, depicting the cruxificion

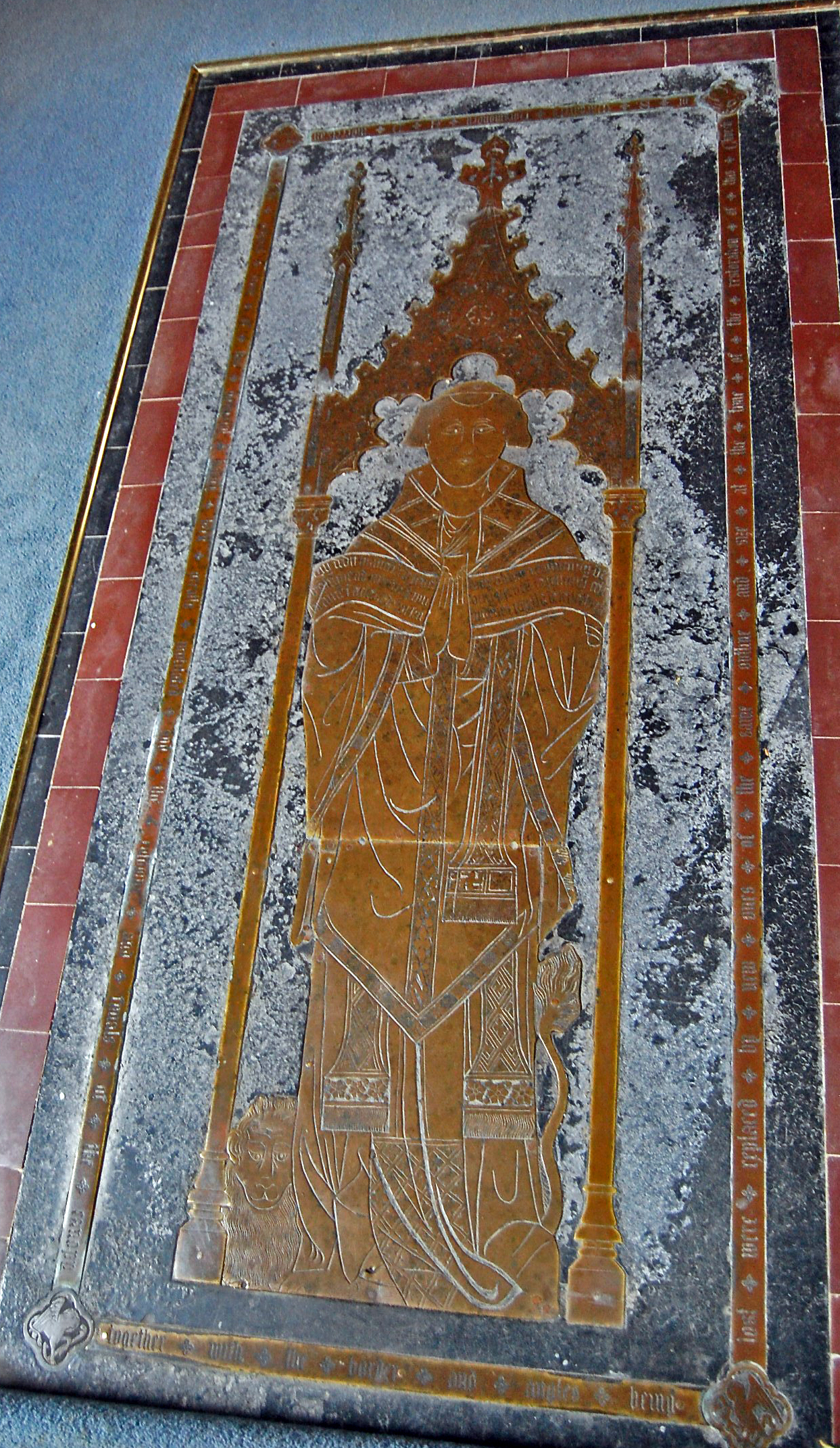
A brass in memory of Henry de Grofhurst

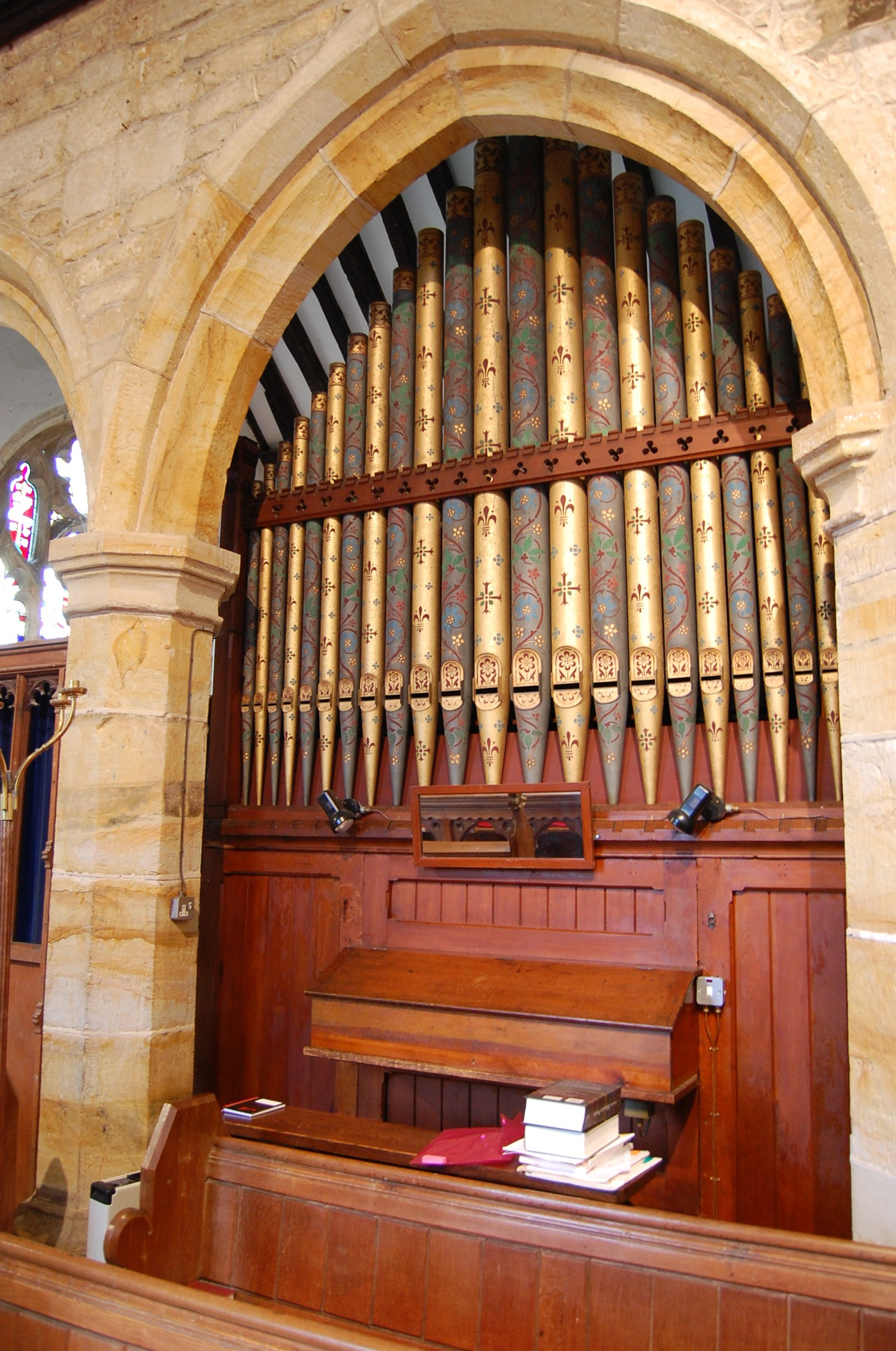
The church organ

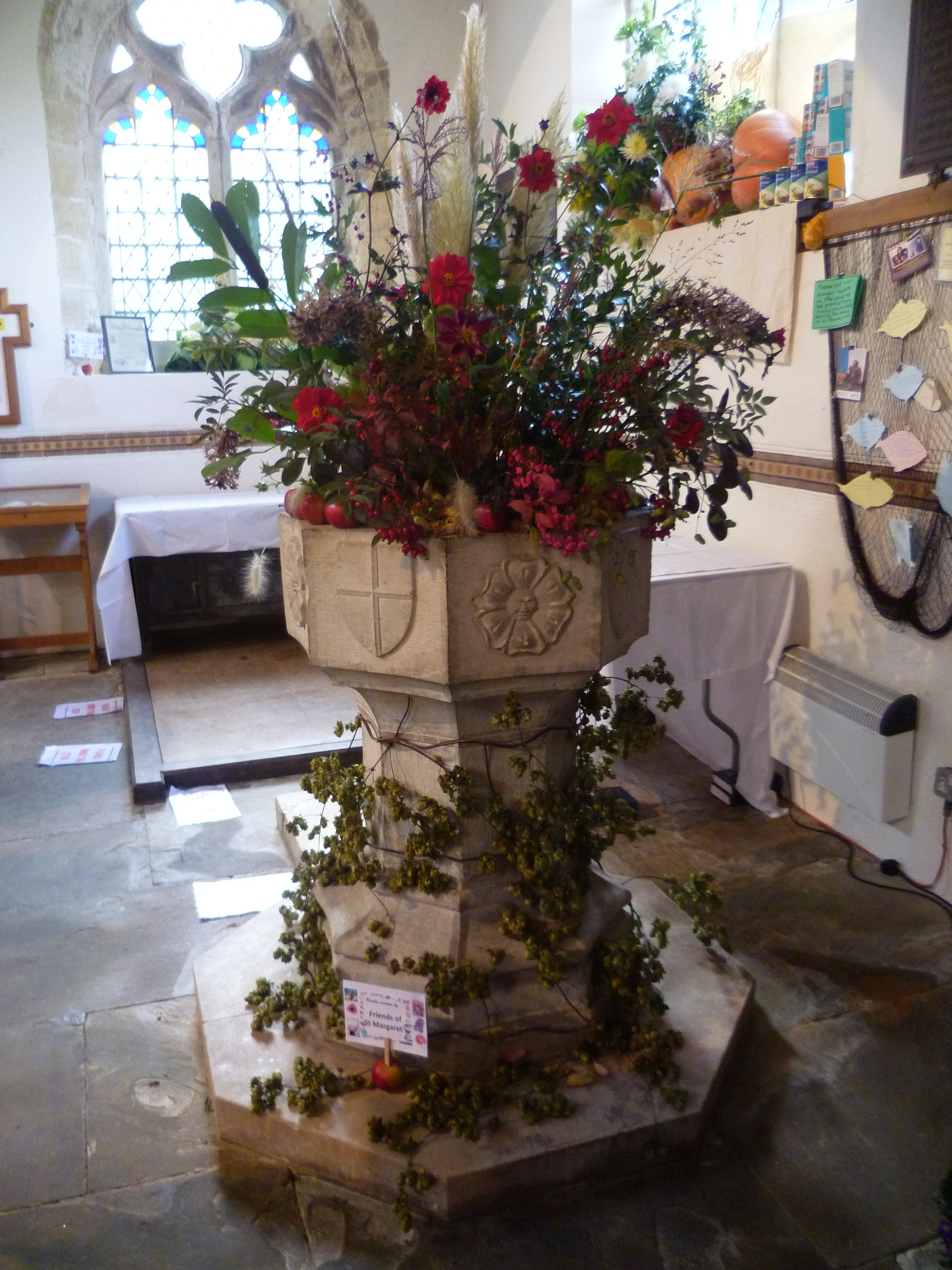
The font

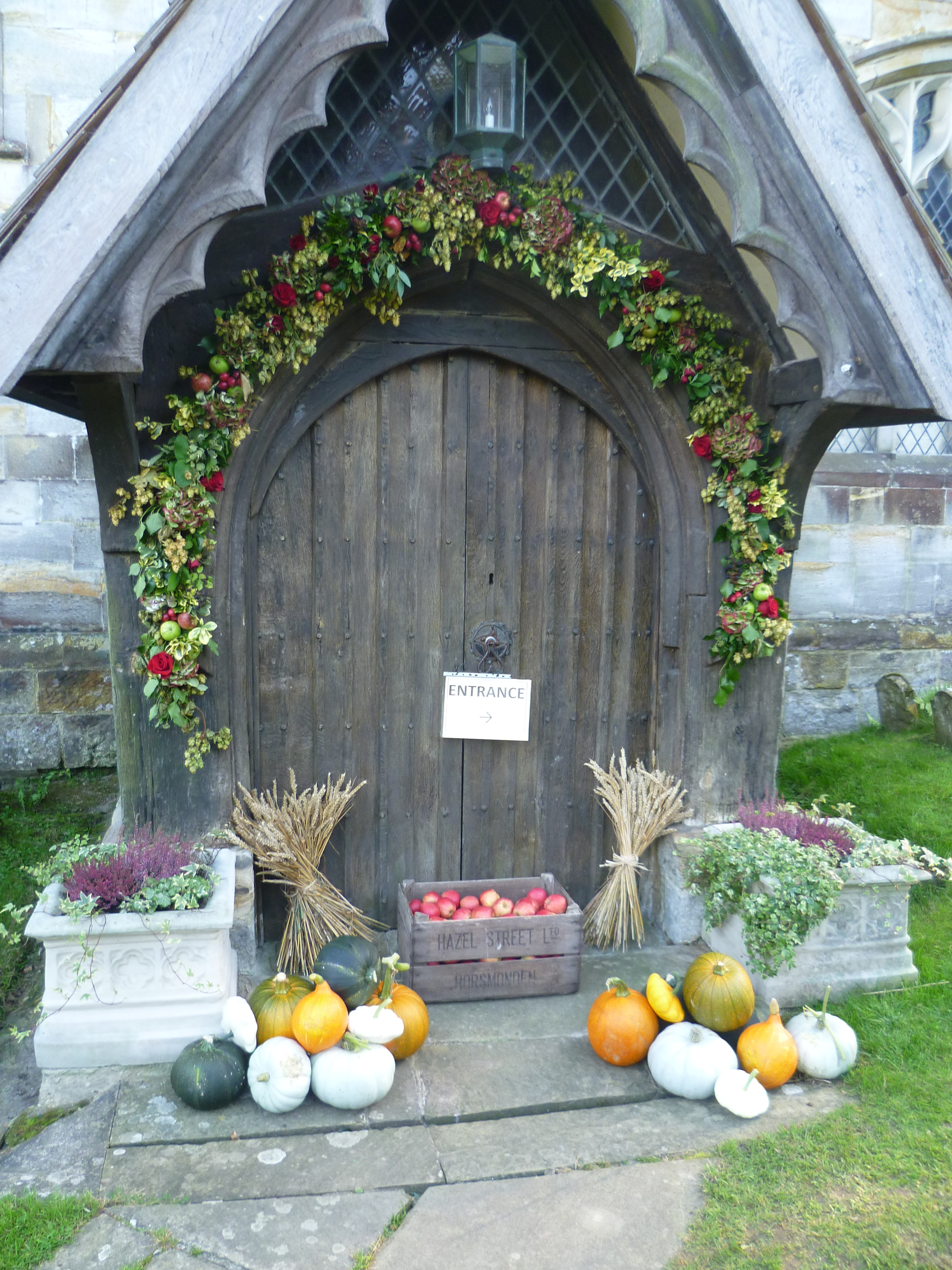
The north porch

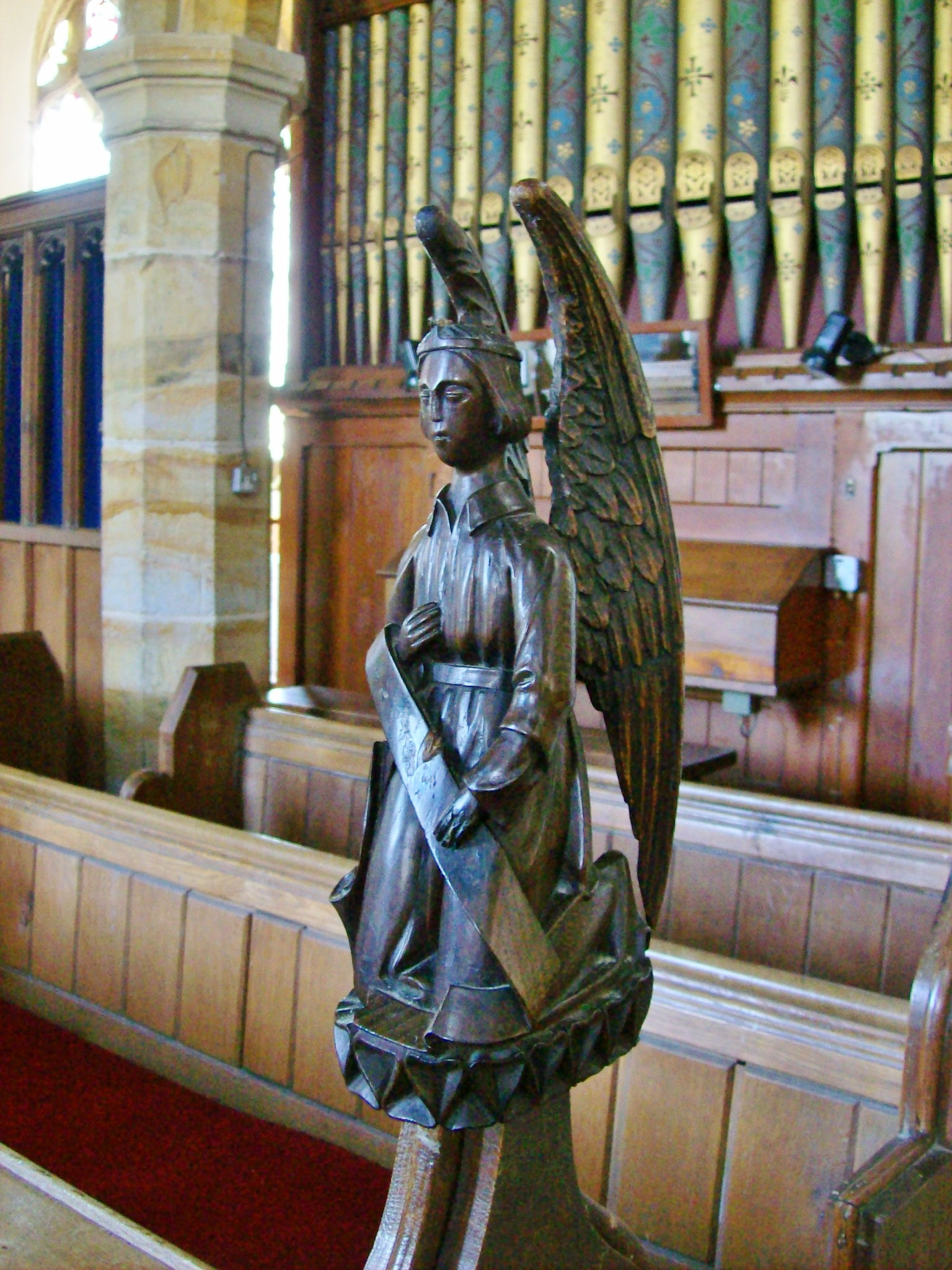
Bench end in the shape of an angel

== See also ==
- Horsmonden
- List of churches in Kent
