= St Mary's Church, Lamberhurst =

Parish church in Kent, England

Coordinates: 51.10386°N 0.40132°E

- Church of St Mary the Virgin
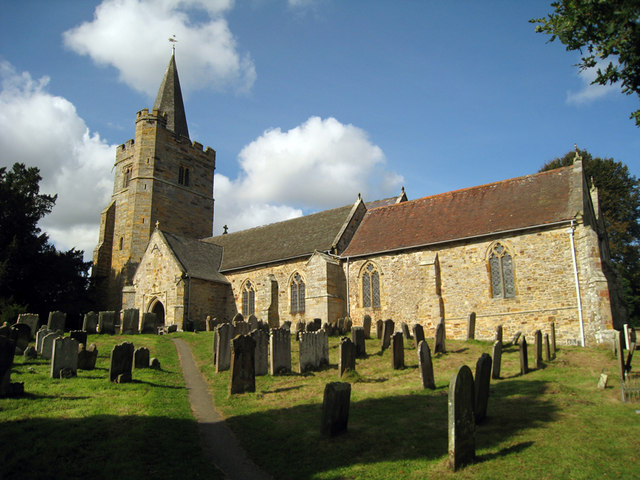

- Location within Kent
- OS grid reference: TQ 68207 36580
- Location: Lamberhurst, Kent
- Country: England
- Denomination: Church of England
- Website: stlukesandstmaryschurches.org/st-marys

History
- Status: Parish church

Architecture
- Functional status: Active
- Heritage designation: Grade I
- Designated: 20 October 1954
- Completed: 998

Administration
- Province: Canterbury
- Diocese: Rochester
- Archdeaconry: Tonbridge
- Deanery: Paddock Wood
- Parish: Lamberhurst

St Mary's Church is a parish church in Lamberhurst, Kent. It is a Grade I listed building.

== Building ==
The first buildings on the site were erected in Saxon times. Records show there was a church or chapel of some sort here in AD998, and that it was consecrated during that year (24 September). The original structure was likely constructed in wood, which has not survived. The church was granted to Leeds Priory around 1137. The building has been expanded, adapted and updated many times since then.

The earliest surviving fabric, located on the southwest side of the south chapel, dates from the early 13th century. The chancel and south chapel were extended in the late 13th century, while the four-bay nave, south aisle, and porch were rebuilt in the early 14th century. The east window of the chancel and the west window of the nave are perpendicular insertions from the mid-15th century, as is the large carved arch with a square hood-mold and quatrefoils above the south porch. The west tower was raised around 1475, constructed of fine ashlar masonry with a large plinth, angle buttresses, and a semi-octagonal stair-turret on the southeast.

Inside, a fine two-tier carved Jacobean pulpit, dated 1630, stands on a tester. The Royal Arms of Queen Anne are displayed over the south doorway.

In 1840, major restoration work was carried out in a rather unskilled way. Many images, crosses, piscinas, and other pieces were repositioned in places soon deemed unsuitable. As a result, the chancel and chapel were both rebuilt in 1870 by Ewan Christian, who retained the 14th century sedilia which stands between the two. They form a stone bench with two quatrefoil openings cut through the backrests, giving a view into the chapel.

There is an ancient Yew by the porch that is estimated to be over 1500 years old, predating the church.

=== Stained Glass ===
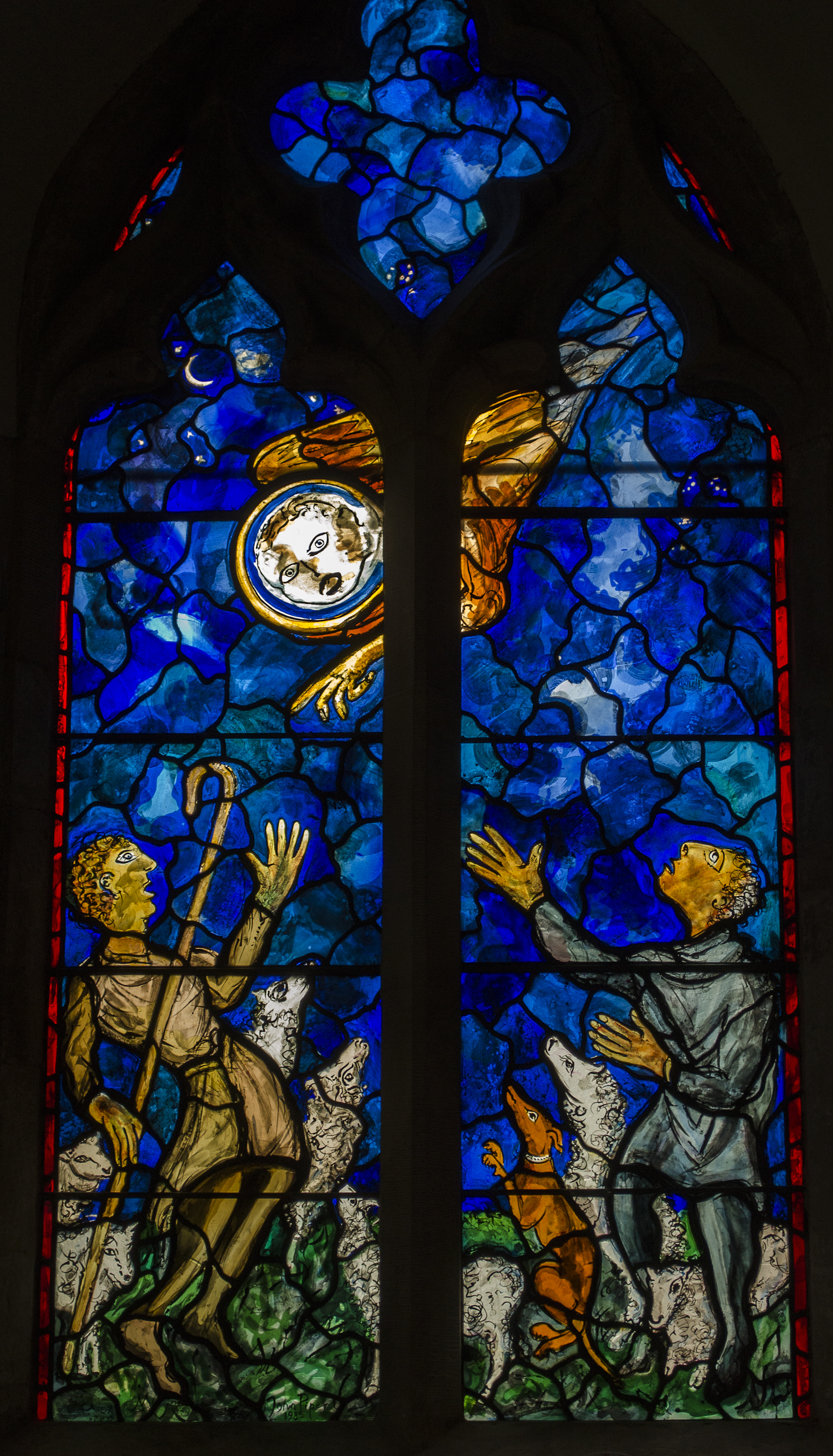
Stained glass window by John Piper

The three-light east window is by Hardman and Co. and depicts Christ in Majesty to the centre, flanked by saints. It was installed in 1870 as part of Ewan Christian's rebuilding. Three windows in the north aisle were also filled with stained glass by Hardman and Co. at the same time, depicting the Holy Trinity, Crucifixion and Nativity.

In the south aisle is an 1899 window by Clayton and Bell depicting the three Christian theological virtues of faith, hope and charity.

The west end of the south wall features a two-light window installed in 1985, depicting the Archangel Gabriel announcing the Birth of Jesus to the shepherds. This window was designed by John Piper and made by David Wasley.

== Burials and memorials ==
The church has a series of wall monuments, the most notable a black and white aedicule to Richard Thomas d.1657, and the series of marble plaques to the Husseys in the south (Scotney) chapel, including those of Edward Hussey, d.1894 and Christopher Hussey, d.1970.

== See also ==
- Lamberhurst
- List of churches in Kent
