= St Michael and All Angels Church, Maidstone =

Parish church in Maidstone, Kent, England

Coordinates: 51.26979°N 0.50579°E

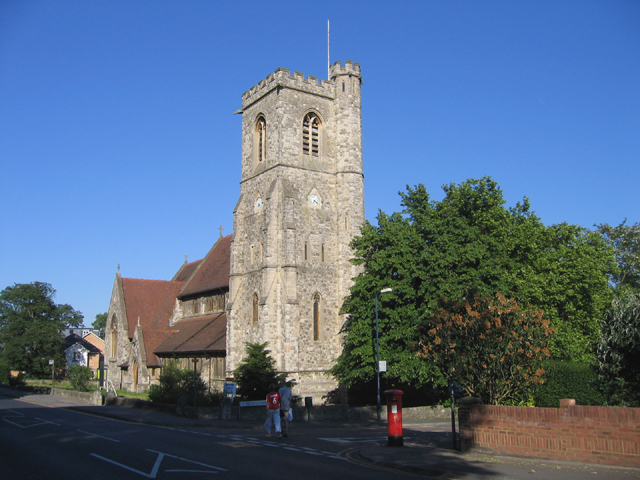

- Location within Kent
- OS grid reference: TQ 74894 55270
- Location: Maidstone, Kent
- Country: England
- Denomination: Anglican
- Website: stmichaelallangels.org.uk

History
- Status: Parish church

Architecture
- Functional status: Active
- Heritage designation: Grade II
- Designated: 16 December 2021
- Completed: 1876

Administration
- Province: Canterbury
- Diocese: Canterbury
- Archdeaconry: Maidstone
- Deanery: Maidstone
- Parish: St. Michael and All Angels Maidstone

St Michael and All Angels Church is a parish church in Maidstone, Kent, England. It is a Grade II listed building.

== Building ==
St Margaret's Church is located on the Tonbridge Road (A26), relatively close to Oakwood Park Grammar School.

The church was originally intended to be dedicated to St. Mary the Virgin.

The building constructed of Kentish ragstone with Bath Stone dressings and red tile roof coverings. There is a 74 ft castellated tower at its western end; complete with a round stair turret as was a common feature in Kent's medieval churches.

== History ==
St Margaret's Church was completed in 1876 to the design of the architect Arthur Blomfield by the contractors Messrs George Naylor of Rochester in Early English and Decorated Gothic style.

The church was intended to cater for Maidstone's rapidly expanding suburbs on the western side of the River Medway after the existing parish church of St. Peter's (now disused as a church but in secular use as a nursery) was proving to be far too small. Located next to the west bank of the river, St. Peter's was also a long way from where the new districts of Westborough and Fant were being built.

== See also ==
- List of churches in Kent
- Maidstone
