= All Saints Church, Brenchley =

Parish church in Brenchley, Kent, England

Coordinates: 51.14999°N 0.40031°E

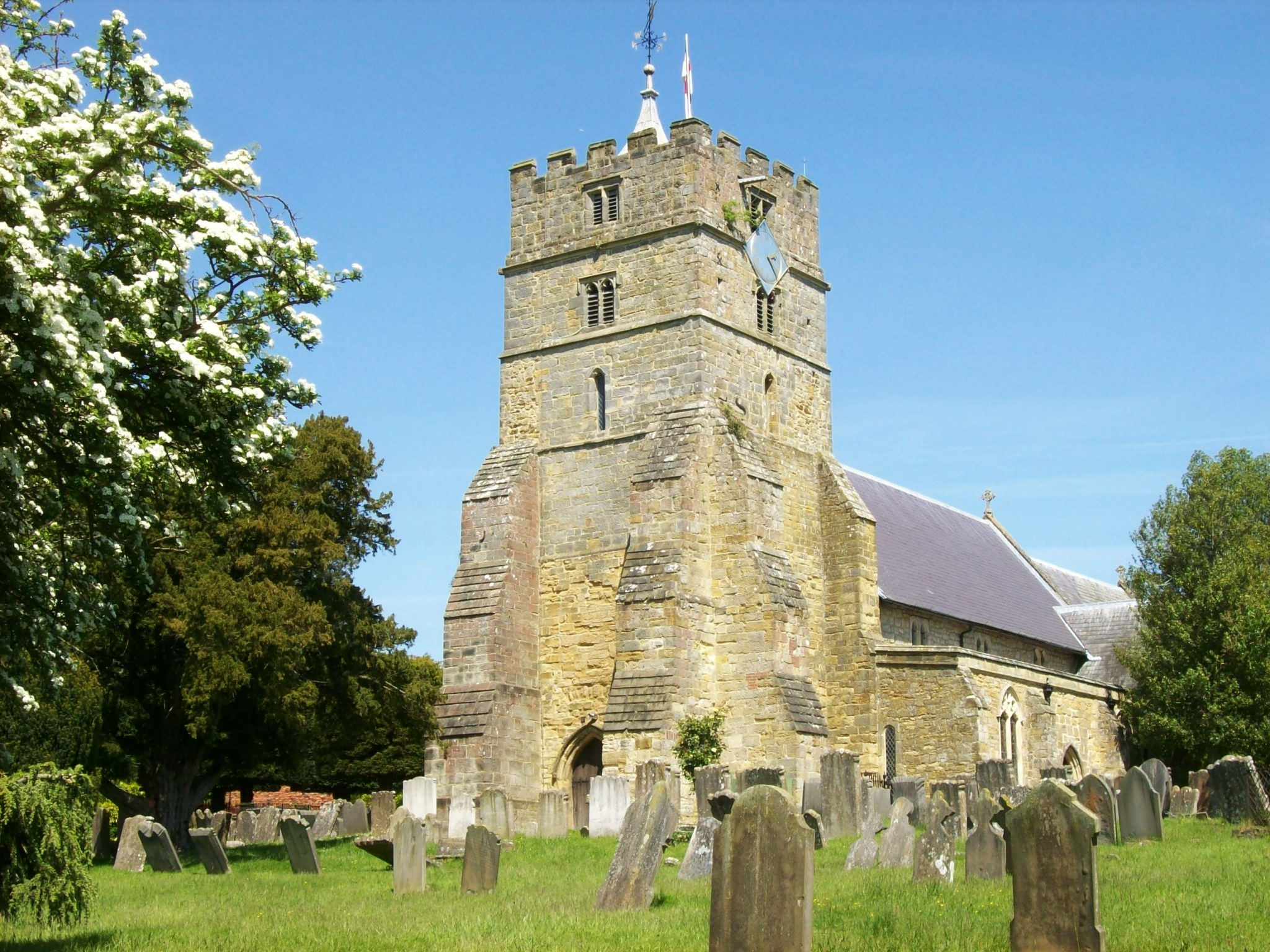

- Location within Kent
- OS grid reference: TQ 67969 41708
- Location: Brenchley, Kent
- Country: England
- Denomination: Anglican
- Website: allsaintsbrenchley.com

History
- Status: Parish church

Architecture
- Functional status: Active
- Heritage designation: Grade I
- Designated: 20 October 1954
- Completed: 1233

Administration
- Province: Canterbury
- Diocese: Rochester
- Archdeaconry: Tonbridge
- Deanery: Paddock Wood
- Parish: Brenchley

All Saints Church is a parish church in Brenchley, Kent, England. It is a Grade I listed building.

It is dedicated to All Saints.

== Building ==
A Chapel in Brenchley was attached to the parish church of Yalding about 1170. It was granted by De Clare, Earl of Hereford and Gloucester, who lived in Tonbridge Castle. The church was built in 1233 in the Early English style. It is of local sandstone and there is a tradition that the material for it was quarried at Pixot Hill nearby.

The church consists of chancel, nave, north and south aisles and a west tower, of three stages with a battlemented parapet and heavily buttressed, all are 13th C except the rebuilt chancel. The nave has clerestory windows. Entrance is via the north door. There is some evidence of pre-13th century masonry. The porch is 14th C. as is the nave roof with 15th-century alterations. The nave has four-bayed north and south aisles, the arcades are 13th century with round piers. The chancel and nave are unusually wide. There are also north and south transepts. The north transept may be an old addition to the church. The Chapel may have been intended for the use as a repository for memorials of the Roberts family. Near the entrance to the transept are the remains of a 16th-century brass showing Thomas and his three wives, Elizabeth, Joan and Agnes, and several children. There is also a wall tablet to Walter Roberts and his wife Barbara sculpted by Edward Marshall.

The church was rebuilt in 1814 and restored in 1849. The chancel roof dates from then. The timber reredos dates from the 1920s, and there are two 13th-century sedilia in the South wall. The West end of the nave has a gallery where the organ is located. There are 8 bells. There was much restoration work to the church fabric in the 20th century which still continues.

The church stands behind an ornate lychgate erected in memory of Queen Victoria’s 60-year reign, and then behind an avenue of 400-year-old yew trees.

== Gallery ==
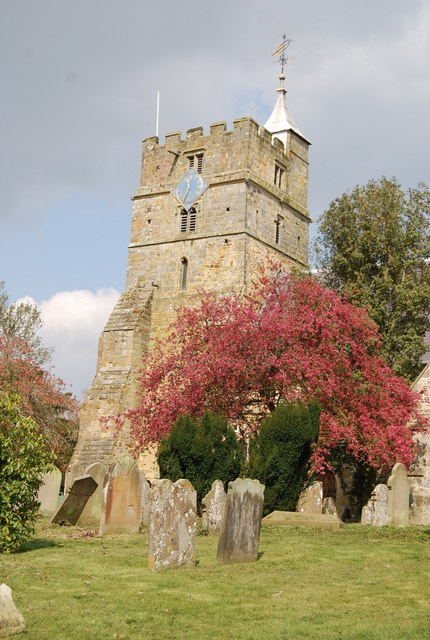
The church tower

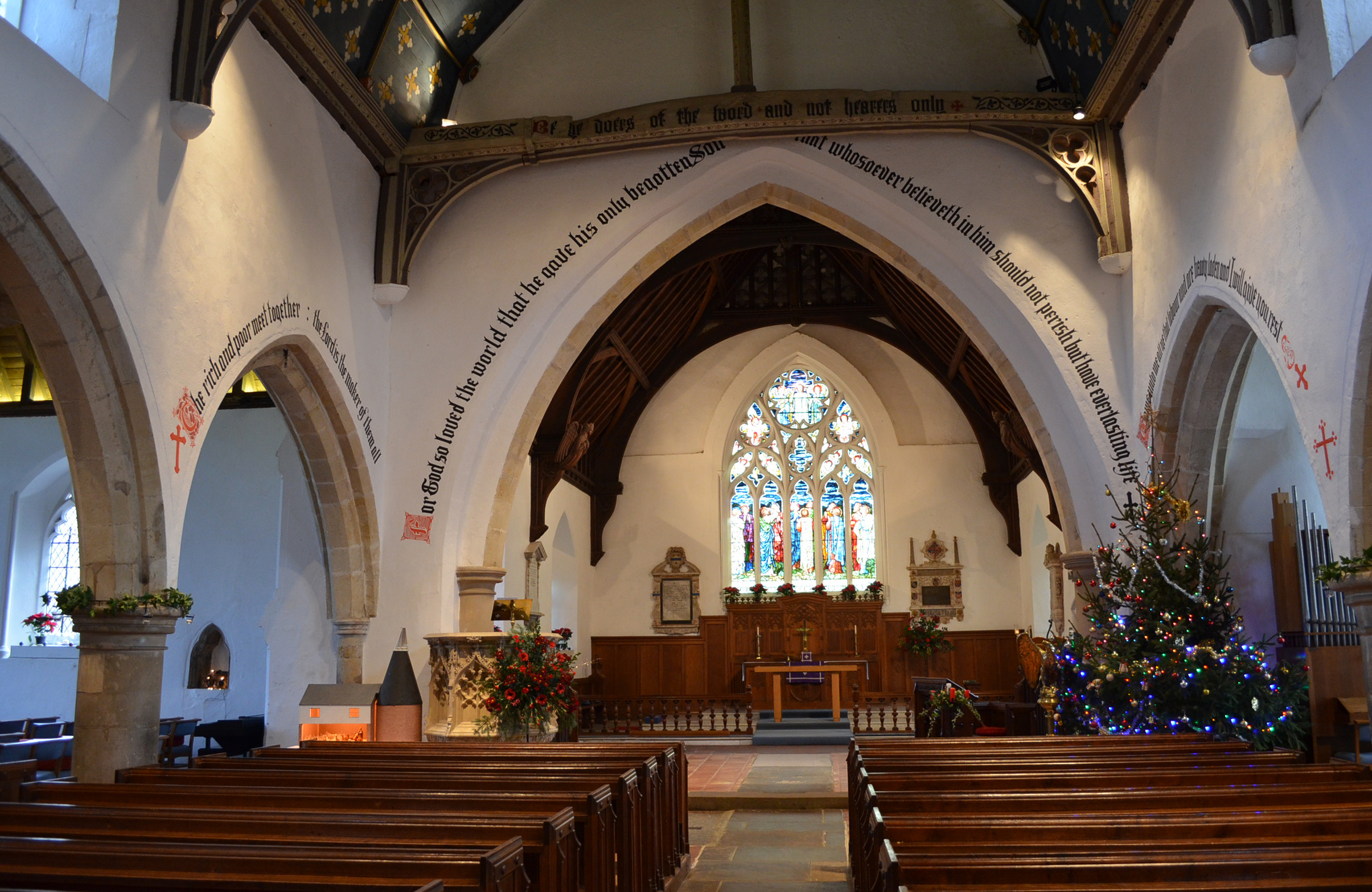
Interior

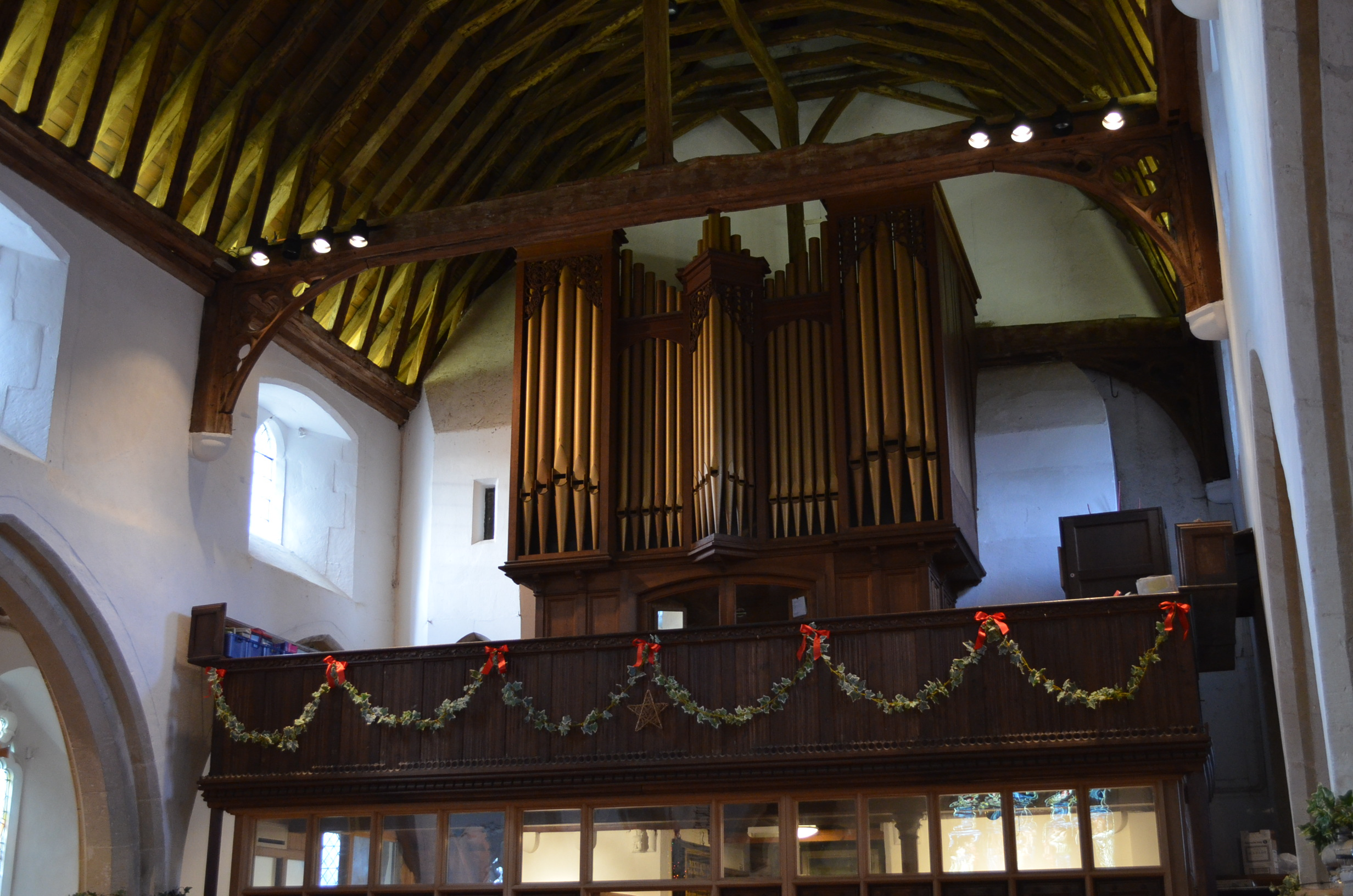
The organ

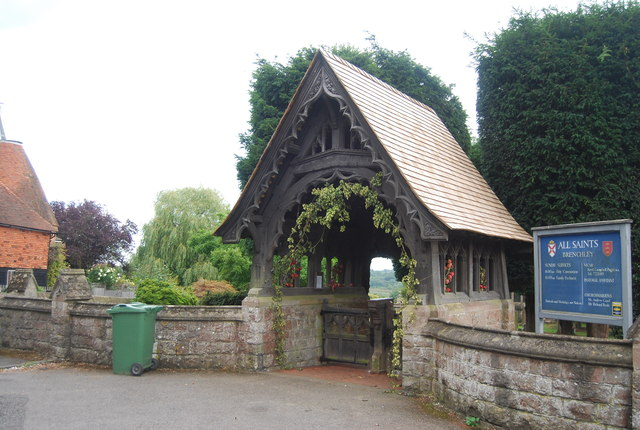
The lychgate

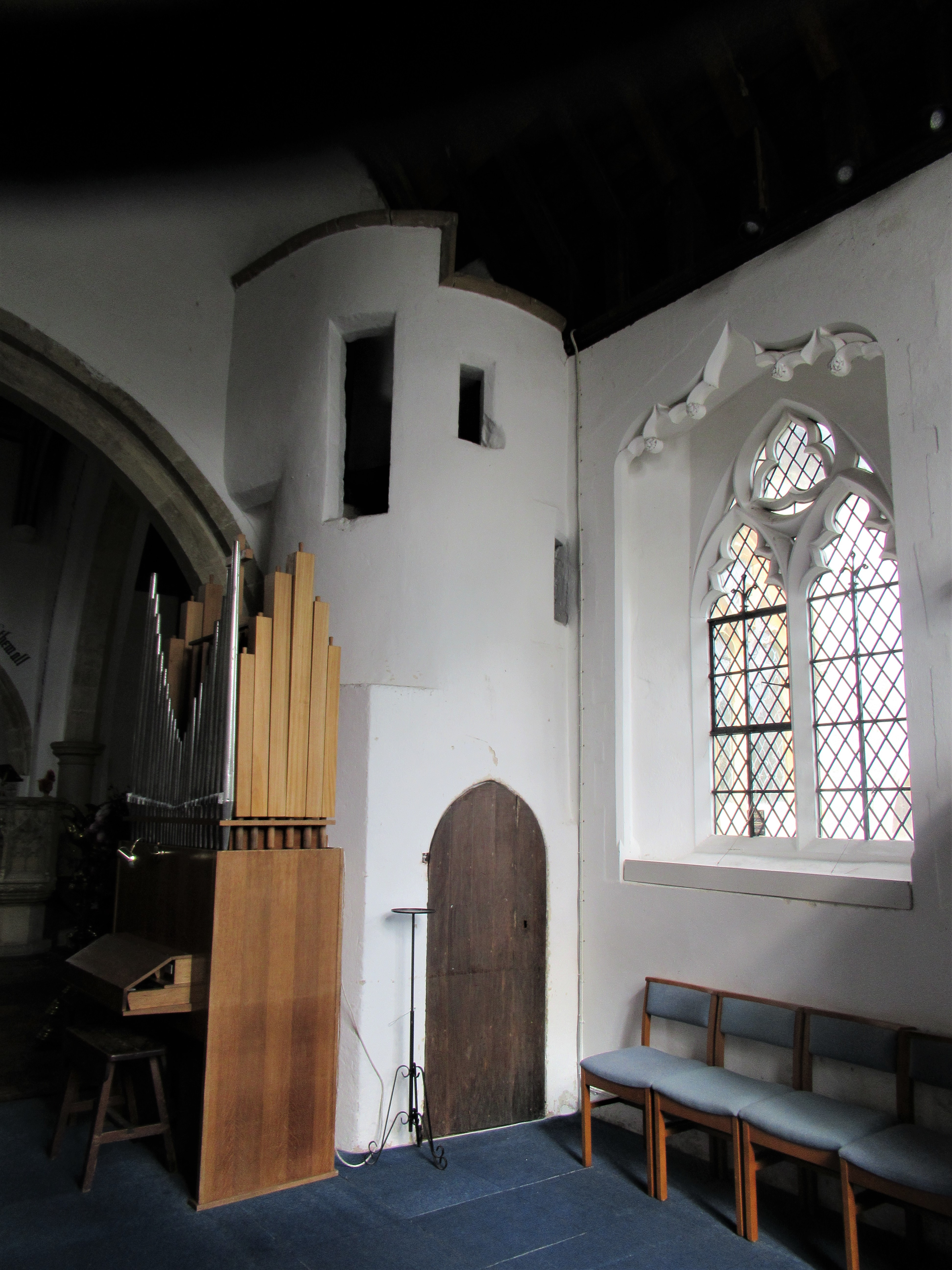
The rood loft stair turret

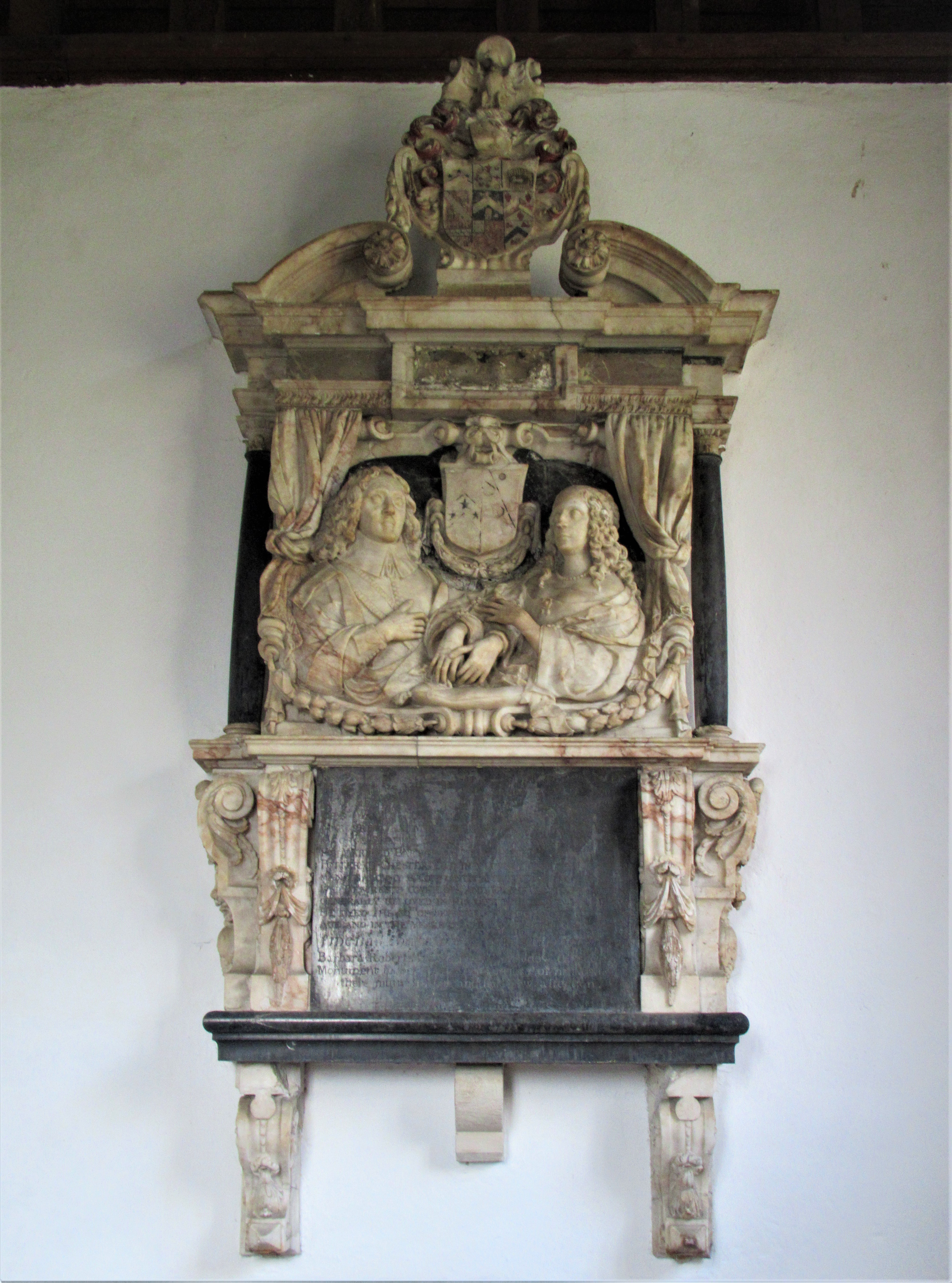
The Roberts memorial

== See also ==
- Brenchley
- List of churches in Kent
