= John Whichcord Sr. =

British architect

John Whichcord Sr. (1790–1860) was a British architect who worked in Maidstone, Kent and designed many public and institutional buildings in the town.

== Life ==
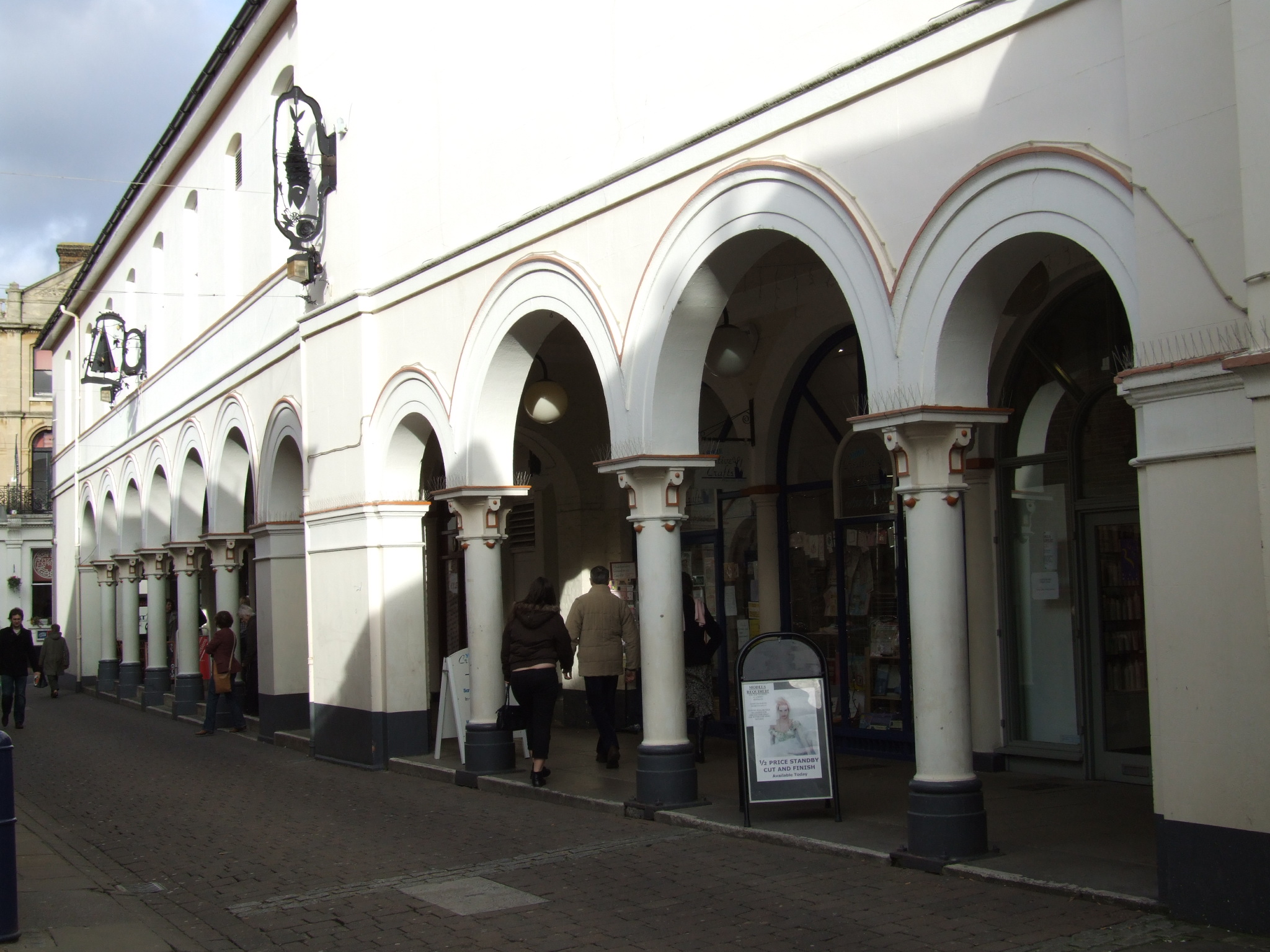
Maidstone Corn Exchange (1835)

Whichcord, the son of a surveyor, was born in Devizes, Wiltshire. He was articled to the Bath architect Charles Harcourt Masters and then worked in the drawing office of the architect of the London Docks, Daniel Asher Alexander, who was also engaged on the prison at Maidstone. In 1819 Whichcord took over the post of surveyor of Maidstone gaol, and two years later also became surveyor of Canterbury gaol. In 1825, when the county surveyor of Kent was dismissed, Whichcord was appointed to the post. His works in the county included the Maidstone Union Workhouse (1836), the Kent Fire Offices, the Maidstone Corn Exchange, and the West Kent Infirmary. He was also surveyor to the Medway Navigation Company, carrying out various works on the river, including tidal locks. The Kent County Lunatic Asylum is described as his Magnum Opus by John Newman (Buildings of England Series, 1969).

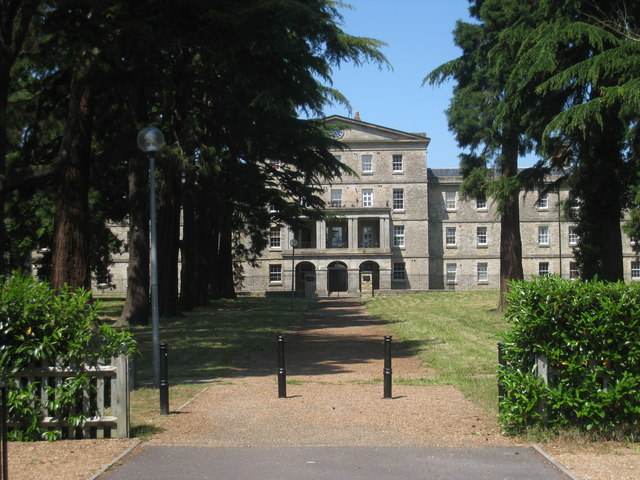
The former Kent Lunatic Asylum today

He designed the new churches of St John, Blindley Heath in Surrey, and Holy Trinity, Maidstone, St Stephen, Tovil, Holy Trinity, East Peckham, St Mary the Virgin, Platt, and Christ Church at Dunkirk, near Faversham, all in Kent. He also produced plans for enlargement or reseating of several existing ones, including St Peter's Church, Maidstone.

He was the Mayor of Maidstone in 1856-1857

His son John Whichcord Jr. (1823–1885) was a notable architect.
