= Edward Martin (cricketer) =

English cricketer

Personal information
- Full name: Edward Martin
- Born: 24 November 1814; Brenchley, Kent, England
- Died: 31 October 1869 (aged 54); Barcombe, Sussex, England
- Batting: Right-handed

Domestic team information
- Years: Team
- 1843–1845: Hampshire
- 1845–1851: Kent

Career statistics
Competition	First-class
Matches	41
Runs scored	682
Batting average	9.34
100s/50s	0/1
Top score	60
Balls bowled	296
Wickets	21
Bowling average	17.66
5 wickets in innings	1
10 wickets in match	0
Best bowling	5/–
Catches/stumpings	20/–
- Source: Cricinfo, 1 May 2010

Edward Martin (24 November 1814 – 31 October 1869) was an English professional cricketer. He played for Hampshire sides and for Kent County Cricket Club

Martin was born at Brenchley in Kent in 1814. He made his first-class cricket debut for a Hampshire side against MCC in 1843. From 1843 to 1845 he played five first-class matches for Hampshire before moving to play for the newly founded Kent County Cricket Club between 1845 and 1851. He played 31 matches for the county, making his debut against Nottinghamshire at Canterbury.

Martin also played first-class cricket for the West of England and Manchester Cricket Club and played, in non-first-class matches, for both Dorset and Oxfordshire sides. He was employed at Oxford University as a professional cricketer.

Martin died on 24 November 1869 at Barcombe in Sussex aged 54.
