= St Michael the Archangel Church, Chatham =

St Michael's Church
- St Michael the Archangel Church
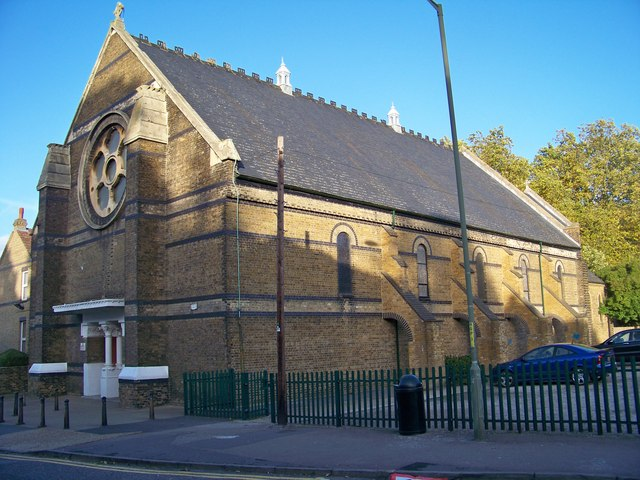
- St Michael's Church
- 51.379494°N 0.520917°E
- OS grid reference: TQ 75532 67509
- Location: Chatham, Kent
- Country: England
- Denomination: Roman Catholic

History
- Status: Parish church
- Dedication: Michael (archangel)
- Consecrated: 6 June 1951

Architecture
- Functional status: Active
- Architect: Henry Clutton
- Style: Romanesque Revival
- Years built: 1862 to 1863

Administration
- Province: Southwark
- Archdiocese: Southwark
- Deanery: Chatham

St Michael the Archangel Church is a Roman Catholic parish church in Chatham, Kent, England. It was built from 1862 to 1863 in the Romanesque Revival style, designed by Henry Clutton. In 1935, an extension was built, designed by the Frederick Walters and Son firm. It is situated on Hill's Terrace between Rochester Street and Maidstone Road, next to Chatham railway station. When built, it was the only Catholic church in Medway.

== History ==
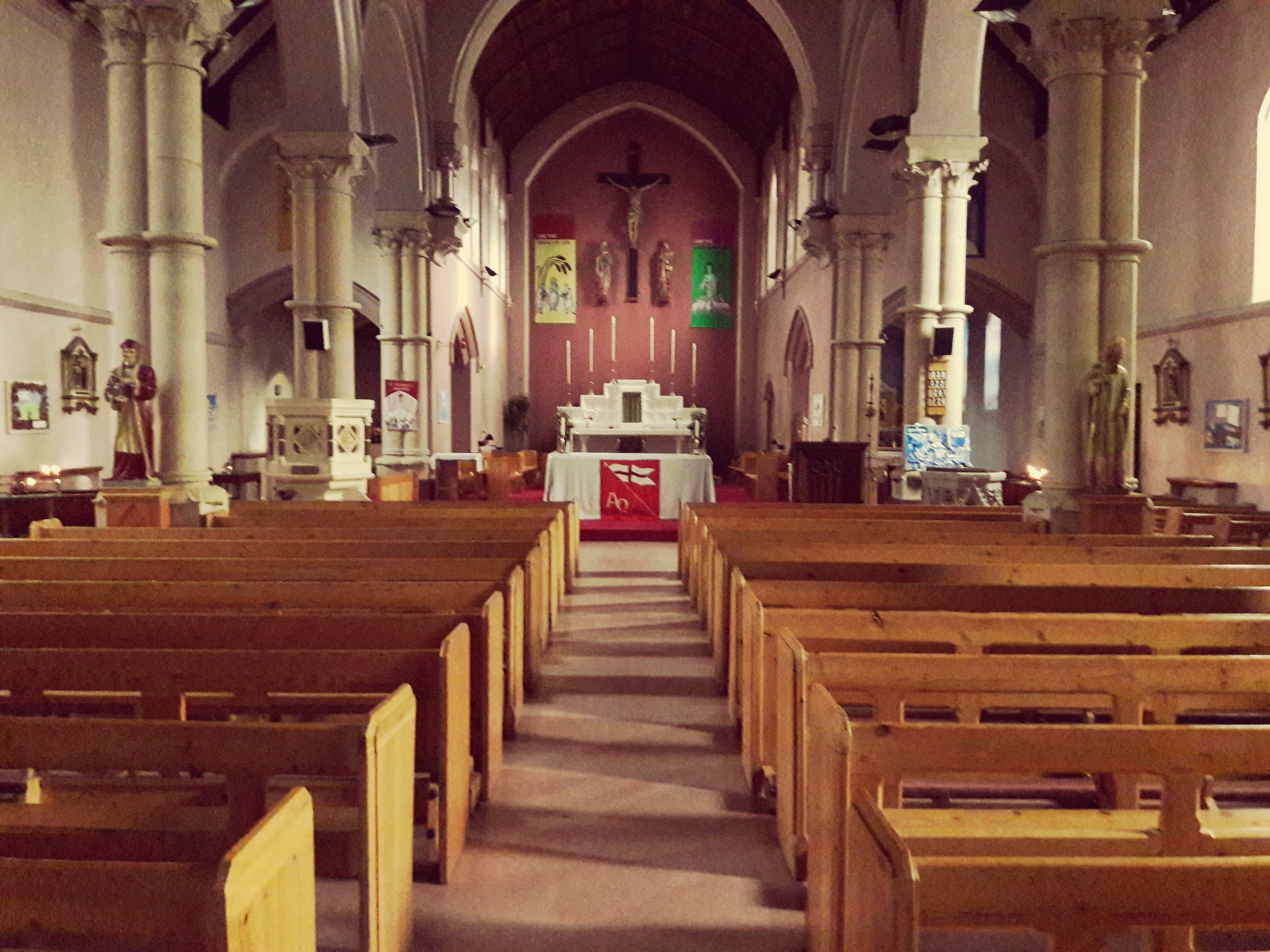
Church interior

=== Foundation ===
In 1795, the first Catholic mission in Medway was founded in Brompton. It created by a French priest. At first, the chapel was housed on Westcourt Street and later on Manor Street. The mission would remain there until St Michael's Church was built.

=== Construction ===
The church was built from 1862 to 1863. It was designed by Henry Clutton and the estimated cost was £1,695. When it was built the church became the centre of the Catholic mission in Medway. From the church, priests would go out to say Mass for Catholic congregations in the surrounding area, such as those in Gillingham. In 1881, the pulpit was given to the church by locally garrisoned Catholic soldiers. St Michael's has an aisled nave under a single roof. The aisles, behind semicircular arcades, have shed ceiling and are lower than the central nave. Therefore this church is a pseudobasilica. Outside, the walls are of yellow brick.

=== Extension ===
In 1929, a new school was built. It was designed by Frederick Walters and Son. In 1935, the sanctuary was extended and side chapels were added. They were also designed by Frederick Walters and Son. The foundation stone of the extension was laid by a Mgr Hallett. On 6 June 1951, the church was consecrated.

== Parish ==
Priests from St Michael's Church also serve St Paulinus Church in Brompton and Sacred Heart Church in Luton. St Paulinus Church was built in 1788 as a Wesleyan Chapel. In 1892, it was bought by the local Catholic Church. St Paulinus Church has one Sunday Mass at 9:00am. Sacred Heart Church also has one Sunday Mass, it is at 10:30am.

St Michael's Church has four Sunday Masses: 6:30pm on Saturday and 9:30am, 11:00am and 6:00pm on Sunday.

== See also ==
- Roman Catholic Archdiocese of Southwark
