= Our Lady of Gillingham Church =

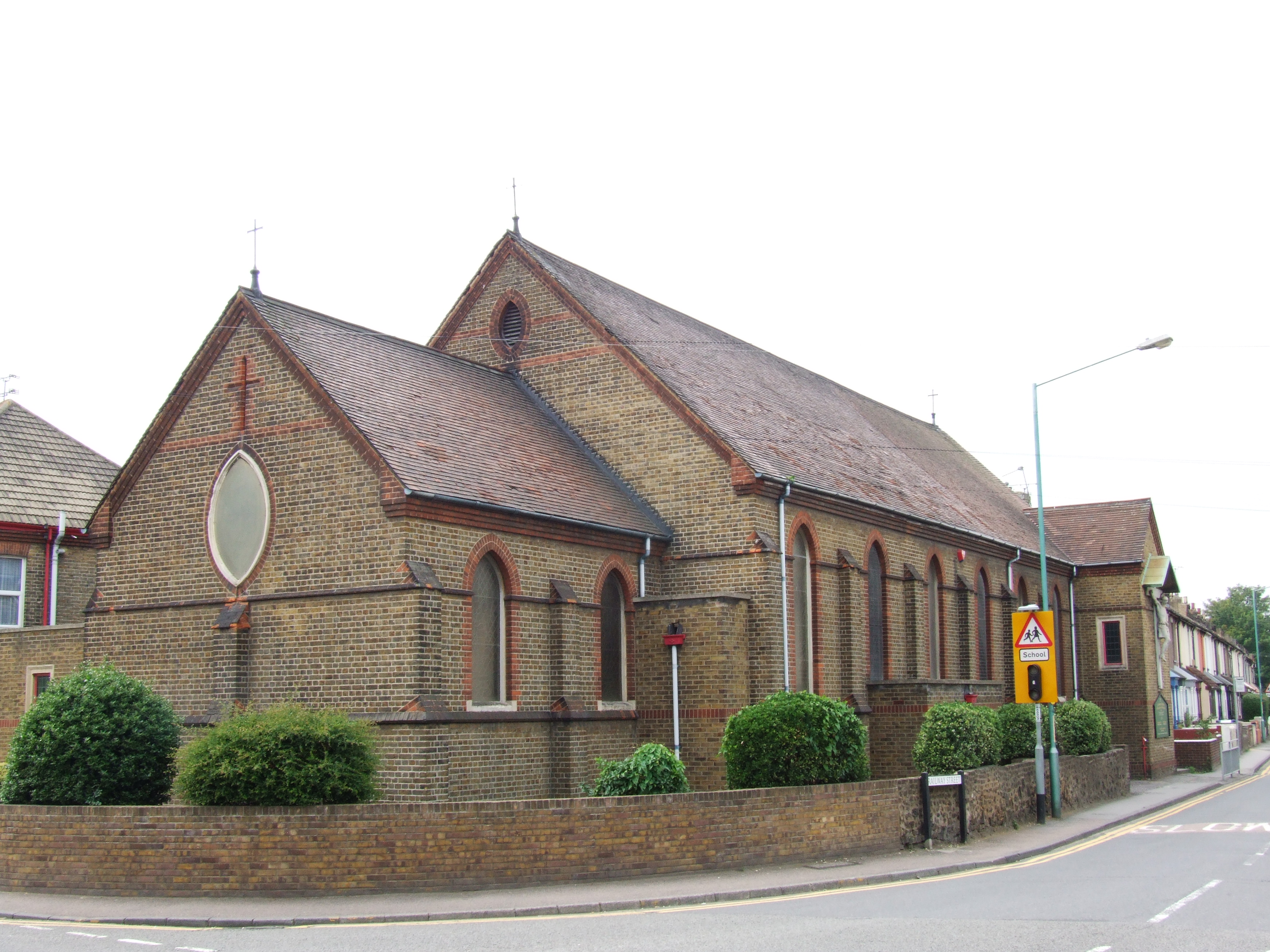
- Corner of Ingram Road and Railway Street
- Our Lady of Gillingham Church
- 51.387745°N 0.558041°E
- OS grid reference: TQ 78083 68516
- Location: Gillingham, Kent
- Country: England
- Denomination: Roman Catholic
- Website: https://www.ourladyofgillingham.com/

History
- Status: Parish church
- Founded: 1888
- Dedication: Blessed Virgin Mary

Architecture
- Functional status: Active
- Style: Gothic Revival
- Years built: 1896

Administration
- Province: Southwark
- Archdiocese: Southwark
- Deanery: Chatham

Our Lady of Gillingham Church is a Roman Catholic Parish church in Gillingham, Kent, England. It was founded in 1888 and built in 1896. It is situated on the corner of Ingram Road and Railway Street, north of Gillingham Rail Depot in the centre of the town. It is a Gothic Revival church. A funeral service for three of the twenty four children killed in the Gillingham bus disaster was held here in 1951.

== History ==
=== Foundation ===
Before a Catholic mission was started in the city, local Catholics had to travel to St Michael the Archangel Church in Chatham. In 1888, a mission was started when Fr Thomas McMahon arrived in the town. The mission was supported by the local Arathoon family. In 1890, construction started on a small building that housed a school and church. It was funded by the Fauld family. It opened in 1893 and later became known as McMahon Hall.

=== Construction ===
On 12 May 1896, the present church was opened by the Archbishop of Southwark, Francis Bourne. In 1903, he became Archbishop of Westminster and cardinal in 1911. The architect is unknown. The high altar and reredos were crafted by a Belgian craftsperson and donated by Louis Brennan.

=== Developments ===
In 1902, the church was extended. In 1934, a new school building was built. It is now called Scott Hall. In 1972, new school buildings were built on Greenfield Road. This meant that only the junior school was left on the old site. In October 1988, more school buildings were built at the new site, and the junior school was moved there. Without a school there, some of the old buildings were demolished and a car park created. In 1990, the church was extended again, this time, with a narthex being added. Between 1999 and 2003, the two halls were refurbished.

== Parish ==
The church has three Sunday Masses, they are at 6:30 pm on Saturday and 9:30 am and 11:30 am on Sunday. There are also Daily masses at 10 am, with two masses on Holy Days of obligation.

== See also ==
- Roman Catholic Archdiocese of Southwark
