= Coxheath =

Village and civil parish in Kent, England

Coordinates: 51.233°N 0.497°E

- Location within Kent
- Population: 4,082 (2011 Census)
- OS grid reference: TQ742511
  - London: 34 miles (55 km)
- District: Maidstone
- Shire county: Kent
- Region: South East
- Country: England
- Sovereign state: United Kingdom
- Post town: Maidstone
- Postcode district: ME17
- Dialling code: 01622
- Police: Kent
- Fire: Kent
- Ambulance: South East Coast
- UK Parliament: Weald of Kent

Coxheath is a village and civil parish within the Borough of Maidstone, Kent, England. The parish is approximately 2.5 miles (4 km) south of Maidstone. It is mainly centred along Heath Road which links the villages of Yalding and Boughton Monchelsea to the west and east, respectively.

A replica beacon pole and the village coat of arms celebrate the role that the village played as a signal bonfire site for many hundreds of years, although there is little visible evidence today of the area's location as a major army camp in the 18th century.

More recently the village was home of a large workhouse that served a large part of mid-Kent during the late nineteenth and early twentieth century. The workhouse is now gone, although its chapel now serves as the village church.

Today, Coxheath is home to one of the South East Coast Ambulance Service's emergency despatch centres for Kent and is twinned with La Séguinière in Maine-et-Loire, France. It was also the birthplace of the World Custard Pie Throwing Championships.

== Toponymy ==
Early documentation shows the name of Coxheath as Cokkyshoth (1422 & 1489) and Coxhoth (1585). The nearby Cock Inn (founded 1568) may point to its etymology.

== History ==
=== Early history ===
Although there is little evidence of early settlement, nearby Boughton Monchelsea was the site of a Roman quarry.

In the 16th century, the strategic position of the ridge determined its choice for one of the sites in the network of beacons erected in the year of the Armada of 1588. The first known site of a beacon was on the ridge near what are known today as Amsbury Road and Westerhill Road.

=== Military Influence ===
Aside from this, until the eighteenth century the heath was a deserted tract of land that was the haunt of highwaymen. It then gained a reputation for the number of Duels fought there. During the 1720s the land started to be used as a venue for cricket matches, becoming known as Coxheath Common cricket ground. This remained the area's main use until 1756, when, with the start of the Seven Years' War, it suddenly became a large military camp, with 12,000 Hanoverian and Hessian troops quartered there.

The county town had mixed views about the camp. The business community was inclined, on the whole, to be forbearing about the disadvantages, but feelings ran high once or twice between Maidstone Corporation and the military authorities about which should exercise the right to punish soldiers who misbehaved themselves in the town's confines.

Inspired by the Prussian army of Frederick the Great which carried out manoeuvres whereby units "fought" against each other and who became the standard by which other European armies measured themselves, the British decided to hold mock battles themselves. Motivated at the time by fear of invasion from France, a number of training camps were established in southern England to allow raw militia and regular troops to train for what seemed an inevitable clash. One site chosen was Coxheath.

The Westminster Magazine covered the events at one such camp held there during the summers of 1778 and 1779. By all accounts, this camp was on a massive scale involving 17,000 troops as well as civilians, many representing the 700 retailers who had come from London to service the soldiers. On 18 September 1778 a mock battle was held on Barming Heath with the Grenadiers, Light Infantry and Dragoons involved.

The camp was the scene of several big reviews of troops by visiting dignitaries, including one by the King himself, George III, and his Queen Charlotte in 1778. The king made it an occasion to knight the Mayor of Maidstone, William Bishop, before he left, which probably did something to reduce the friction between the camp and the nearby town. The last important cricket match was played in 1789, the year of the French Revolution.

It is believed that the nursery rhyme "The Grand old Duke of York", was set in the barracks and the hill involved was one of Linton Hill, Westerhill or Vanity Lane. Soon after the defeat of Napoleon at the Battle of Waterloo, most of the troops were discharged. The army encampment was closed in 1815 by an Act of Parliament and then in 1817 the heath was enclosed by local landowners, removing the right of villagers to use it.

Heath Road (now designated as the B2163) which bisects the village, runs in an absolutely straight line for over 2 miles (although the majority of this section of the road resides within neighbouring Boughton Monchelsea and Linton). The very straight course of this road is the direct result of work by the military engineers.

=== Coxheath Union ===
The enactment of the new Poor Law in 1834, led to the creation of the "Coxheath Poor Law Union" in 1835, more commonly known simply as the Coxheath Union. This union also involved many of the other local parishes. A reluctant Maidstone was finally coerced into joining in 1836, bringing the number of parishes involved to 15 and leading to the union's name being officially changed to the Maidstone Union (although contemporary references appear to show that the Coxheath Union name remained in general use).

The Maidstone Union Workhouse was built in 1836 at a site to the south of Heath Road, replacing a smaller workhouse built near the junction of Heath Road and Stockett Lane in 1771. By the mid-19th century when Kent was producing half of the entire national crop and something like 50,000 acres (200 km^{2}) were under cultivation, thousands of Londoners were travelling into Kent in search of work in the hop gardens. Eventually, supply outstripped demand and many arrived in the countryside only to be told they were not required. Hungry and destitute, they threw themselves on the mercy of the union house-keepers. In 1867 the workhouse was home for 600 to 700 people.

=== 20th century ===
The modern civil parish was created in 1964 from areas formerly within the parishes of East Farleigh and Linton (and to a lesser extent areas from Hunton and Loose), the timing coinciding with large scale housing developments in the village.

The old workhouse was incorporated into Linton Hospital, though this, in the mid-1990s, finally closed and was demolished.

== Landmarks ==
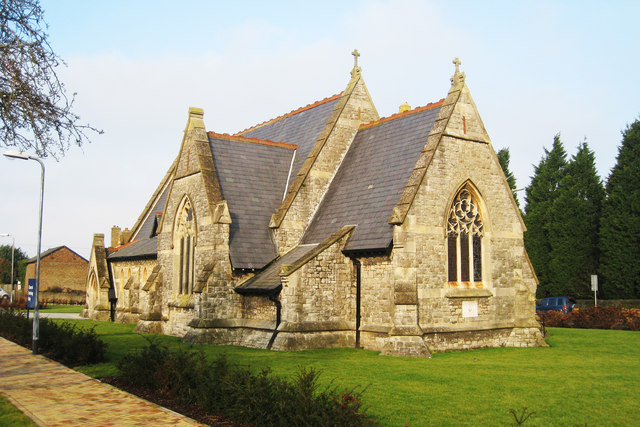
Holy Trinity Church, Coxheath

Holy Trinity Church, on Heath Road, is a distinctive landmark of Coxheath.

A replica beacon bearing the village's coat of arms celebrates the area's role as a signal bonfire site since the time of the Armada stands on the side of the Heath Road opposite the Bird in Hand public house. The original beacon, and its first replica, were blown down and replaced.

== Twinning with La Séguinière ==
The twinning of La Séguinière and Coxheath was born from a meeting of representatives from the two villages in 1995. It was formalized by La Séguinière in 2003 and by Coxheath in 2004. Its main objective is to promote linguistic and cultural exchanges between the two villages.

Alternating between the two municipalities, a meeting is held each year. The proposed association also aims to foster placements for young people in England and France.

== Governance ==
The current parish chairman is Mr Gavin Crickett. Coxheath is part of the parliamentary constituency of Weald of Kent, whose Member of Parliament as of 2025 is Katie Lam of the Conservative Party. Prior to Brexit in 2020, it was represented by the South East England constituency for the European Parliament.

== Geography ==
The village sits on the very southern edge of the greensand ridge that runs through Kent. To the north the land descends gently into the Medway valley. To the south there is a steeper descent down into the Low Weald.

== Demography ==
Coxheath compared
2001 UK Census	Coxheath ward	Maidstone (non-metropolitan district)	England
Population	3,856	138,948	49,138,831
Foreign born	3.2%	4.6%	9.2%
White	98.7%	98.3%	90.9%
Asian	0.2%	0.7%	4.6%
Black	0.3%	0.1%	2.3%
Christian	80.6%	76.1%	71.7%
Muslim	0.2%	0.3%	3.1%
Hindu	0.1%	0.2%	1.1%
No religion	11.9%	15%	14.6%
Unemployed	2%	1.9%	3.3%
Retired	17.1%	14.2%	13.5%

At the 2001 UK census, the Coxheath electoral ward had a population of 3,856 in 1,582 households, of whom 3,732 (96.8%) were British by birth. In terms of ethnicity, 98.7% described themselves as white, with 0.5% mixed, 0.2% Asian or Asian British, 0.3% Black or Black British and 0.4% Chinese or other ethnic group. Religion was recorded as 80.6% Christian, 0.2% Muslim, 0.2% Buddhist, 0.1% Hindu. 11.9% were recorded as having no religion, 0.4% had an alternative religion and 6.7% did not state their religion. Of the 3,120 adults (aged 16 and over), the socio-economic breakdown by NRS social grade found 1,631 people fell into the ABC1 category and 1,489 people into the C2DE grouping.

The economic activity of the 2,792 residents aged 16–74 was 43.6% in full-time employment, 14.1% in part-time employment, 8.8% self-employed, 2.0% unemployed, 1.9% students with jobs, 2.9% students without jobs, 17.1% retired, 5.3% looking after home or family, 2.7% permanently sick or disabled and 1.8% economically inactive for other reasons. The industry of employment of residents was 19.3% retail, 12.3% manufacturing, 11.3% real estate, 11.2% health and social work, 10.5% construction, 7.3% transport and communications, 6.6% education, 5.8% finance, 5.2% public administration, 2.9% hotels and restaurants, 1.9% agriculture and 5.7% other.

== Transport ==
The village is served by bus services provided by Arriva. It does not have a railway station. The nearest station is East Farleigh on the Medway Valley Line. The closest mainline services are via Maidstone East to the north (serving London and Ashford/Canterbury/Ramsgate ) or Staplehurst and Marden to the south on the Southeastern Main Line.

== Education ==
In 2023 Coxheath Primary School had 432 pupils aged between 4 and 11. Secondary education is provided by schools elsewhere in the Maidstone area.

== World Custard Pie Throwing Championship ==
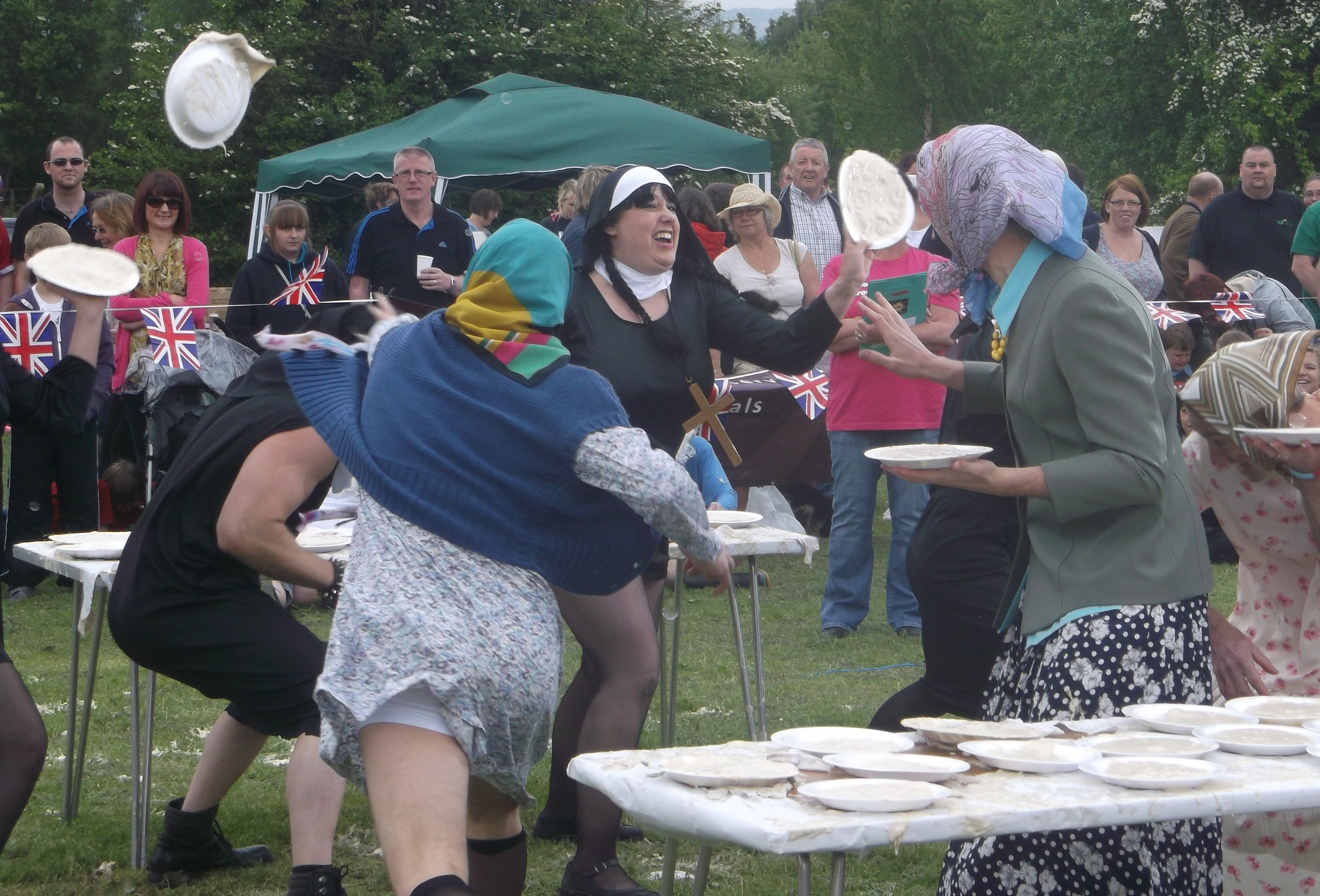
Custard Pie Flinging at Coxheath, during the World Custard Pie Throwing Championship of 2013

Coxheath was the original home of the World Custard Pie Throwing Championship, with the inaugural event held in the village on 24 June 1967. Councillor Mike Fitzgerald, who founded the championships (and latterly served as Mayor of Maidstone in 2006/7), originally organised the event to raise money to build a village hall and was inspired by the Charlie Chaplin comedy film Behind the Screen. More than 80 teams threw custard pies at each other during its heyday dressed in Victorian Era style costumes or the latest fashion style at that time. In its early days it was only open to men as it was thought unacceptable for women to join in. Before long worldwide teams came from Japan, Canada, Finland and Germany. The winners of the Custard Pie Trophy were usually women. This tradition came to an end in 1982 at Coxheath when Councillor Fitzgerald moved to Ditton taking the championships with him, and it ended in 1988 after the trophy was lost.

The competition was revived on 6 June 2007, and it has been held annually in Coxheath since then. In 2020 it was cancelled due to the COVID-19 pandemic. Notable teams include The team Pie Face who won in 2018, 2023 and runners up in 2024

== Notable people ==
- Hugh Kennard (1918–95), Battle of Britain pilot and owner of a number of airlines postwar, was born in Coxheath.
- William Hartnell (1908-75), the first actor to play Doctor Who spent several months at Linton Hospital, Coxheath until his death.
