= Brenchley =

Village in Kent, England

Coordinates: 51.1486°N 0.3941°E

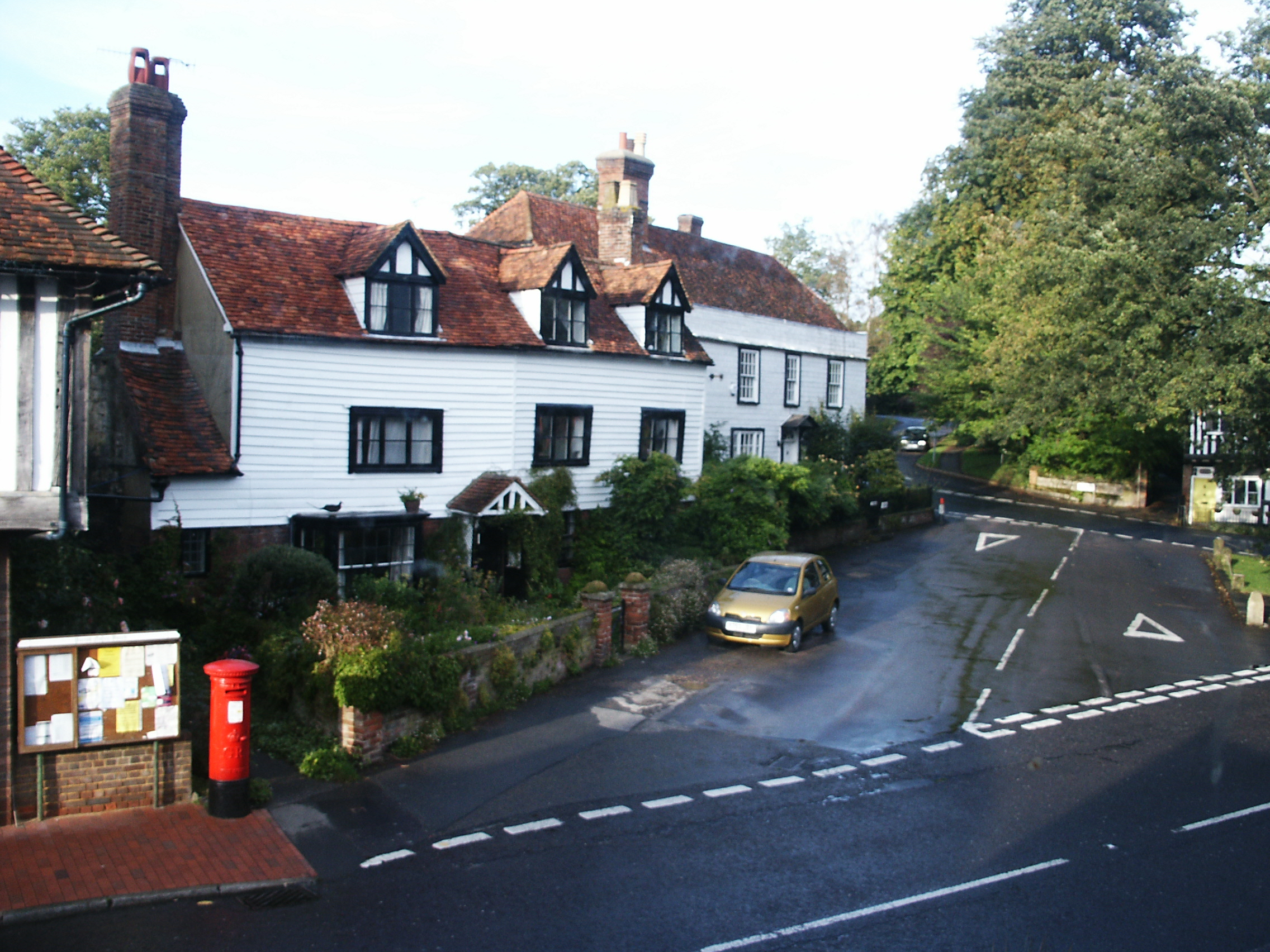
- Brenchley

- Location within Kent
- Population: 2,715 (Parish); 2,863 (2011 Census)
- OS grid reference: TQ675415
- Civil parish: Brenchley and Matfield
- District: Tunbridge Wells
- Shire county: Kent
- Region: South East
- Country: England
- Sovereign state: United Kingdom
- Post town: Tonbridge
- Postcode district: TN12
- Dialling code: 01892
- Police: Kent
- Fire: Kent
- Ambulance: South East Coast
- UK Parliament: Tunbridge Wells

Brenchley is a village in the civil parish of Brenchley and Matfield, in the borough of Tunbridge Wells, Kent, England.

All Saints Church is located in the village, and is a Grade I listed building.

== History ==
The name is historically derived from Branca's Leigh. The village is located 8 miles (13 km) east of Royal Tunbridge Wells, and 3 miles (4.8 km) south of Paddock Wood, and includes the neighbouring village of Matfield. Brenchley & Matfield CoE primary school is located in Brenchley.

The village earns some historical fame by being one of the villages that was closely involved in post medieval iron making. The site of the furnace lies within the parish of Horsmonden now.

A Market formerly held in the churchyard at Brenchley was granted in 1230 to Hamo de Crevecoeur, to be held on his own land, and the day moved from Sunday to Wednesday. In 1233 this was readjusted to Saturday. By 1296 it belonged to Gilbert de Clare, who in 1312 claimed that his ancestors had held it 'from time out of mind'.

== Notable people ==
- George (b. 1600) and John Lewis (b. 1606), early colonists of the Massachusetts Bay Colony arriving aboard the Hercules of Sandwich, England in 1634/5.
- John Browne, (d1651), the second holder of the office of King's Gunfounder.
- Hamo de Crevecoeur (d 1263), Norman nobleman who possessed Brenchley and established a market.
- Gordon Giltrap (b 1948), musician, was born in Brenchley.
- Edward Martin (1814–69), English cricketer who was born in Brenchley.
- Richard Philpott (1813–88), English cricketer who resided in Brenchley at the time of his death.
- Sophie Rhys-Jones (b 1965), wife of Prince Edward, lived in Brenchley.
- Thomas Thornycroft (1815–85), sculptor, lived in Brenchley at the time of his death.
- Wat Tyler (1341–1381), leader of the Peasants' Revolt, is reputed to have been born in Brenchley.
- Siegfried Sassoon.
- Dr. Samuel Cox Hooker. (1864-1935) was a chemist whose chief hobby was conjuring.

== See also ==
- Marle Place - local open Garden with a Victorian gazebo, Edwardian rockery, walled Italianate scented garden, modern mosaic terrace, grass tennis court and artist's studio and gallery.

== Sources ==
- F C Clark (1947). Kentish Fire. Rye, Sussex: Adams & Son.
