= Holy Trinity Church, Coxheath =

Parish church in the village of Coxheath, Kent, England

Coordinates: 51.23191067958504°N 0.49655865877819083°E

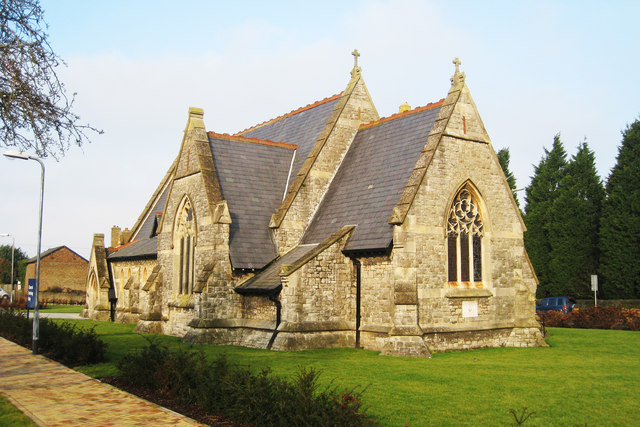

- Location within Kent
- OS grid reference: TQ 74390 51035
- Location: Coxheath, Kent
- Country: England
- Denomination: Anglican
- Website: unitedbenefice.church/coxheath

History
- Status: Parish church

Architecture
- Functional status: Active
- Heritage designation: Grade II
- Designated: 6 September 1989
- Completed: 1884

Administration
- Province: Canterbury
- Diocese: Rochester
- Archdeaconry: Tonbridge
- Deanery: Malling
- Parish: Coxheath

Holy Trinity Church is a parish church in the village of Coxheath, Kent, England. It is a Grade II listed building.

== Building ==
Holy Trinity Church is located adjacent to Heath Road, on a green. The building is mostly constructed of coursed ragstone, and has a slate roof. The stained glass window on the east side (installed 1885), depicts the crucifixion of Jesus with a dove and Star of David above.

== History ==
The church was built in 1883 as the chapel for the Maidstone Union Workhouse that was built roughly four miles from Maidstone Town Centre on a piece of common land known as Cox's Heath (what would later become the village of Coxheath). It superseded a previous chapel built within the workhouse complex, and was officially dedicated in 1884. Following the closure of the workhouse around 1930, its site became Linton Hospital, and the building served as the hospital's chapel. The building gained the dedication of Holy Trinity, which it still carries today. The Chapel passed to the Church of England in 1996, and became a church to serve the growing village of Coxheath.

== See also ==
- Coxheath
