= Lamberhurst =

Village in Kent, England

Coordinates: 51.097°N 0.393°E

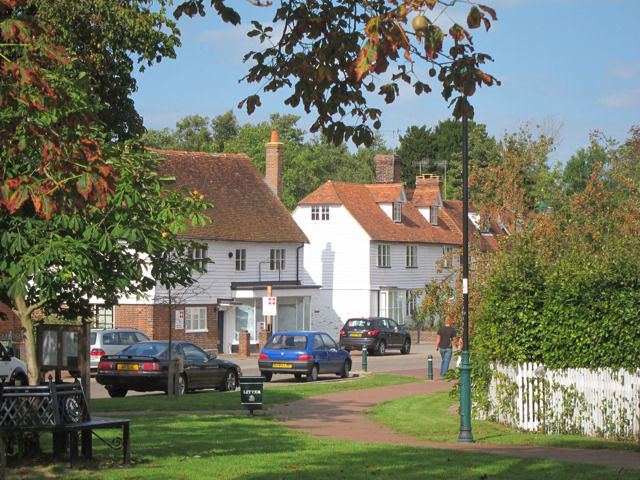
- The Broadway

- Location within Kent
- Population: 1,706 (2011 Census)
- OS grid reference: TQ6736
- Civil parish: Lamberhurst
- District: Tunbridge Wells
- Shire county: Kent
- Region: South East
- Country: England
- Sovereign state: United Kingdom
- Post town: TUNBRIDGE WELLS
- Postcode district: TN3
- Dialling code: 01892
- Police: Kent
- Fire: Kent
- Ambulance: South East Coast
- UK Parliament: Tunbridge Wells

Lamberhurst (/ˈlæmbərhɜːrst/) is a village and civil parish in the borough of Tunbridge Wells in Kent, England. The parish contains the hamlets of The Down and Hook Green. At the 2001 Census it had a population of 1,491, increasing to 1,706 at the 2011 Census.

== History ==
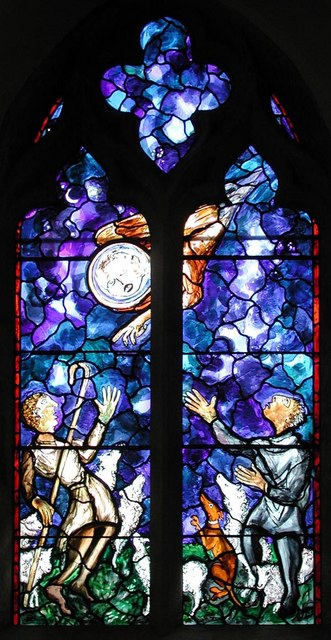
St Mary's, Lamberhurst: The Annunciation to the Shepherds. Stained glass by John Piper.

The place-name 'Lamberhurst' is first attested in the Textus Roffensis of circa 1100 AD, where it appears as Lamburherste. The name means 'lambs' hill or wood'.

Prior to the Industrial Revolution, Lamberhurst was a centre for the Wealden iron industry, which was established in Roman times. Since then it has had some importance for hop-growing; been a weekend home to Margaret Thatcher; been controversially by-passed; and played a major role in English wine production.

Lamberhurst civil parish on formation, when such parishes first became possible in the 19th century, was in both Kent and East Sussex. The line of the county boundary was adjusted following the Local Government Act 1894, which required that parish boundaries be aligned with counties. The redrawing of the county boundary included transferring part of Bayham Lake so its entirety was in Kent.

== Geography and topography ==
The village lies in the valley of the River Teise, one of the main tributaries of the River Medway. The valley of one of its tributaries, the River Bewl, was dammed and flooded between 1973 and 1975 creating the Bewl Water reservoir. The village itself has a large conservation area with many 17th- and 18th-century buildings, and the Strict Baptist Church, established in the village since the 18th century.

== Historically significant buildings and gardens ==
To the west of the high street, The Broadway, are the ruins of Bayham Old Abbey, owned by English Heritage, and its replacement listed gardens and house, while to the east is the 14th-century Scotney Castle, a property of the National Trust. The moat and lake in the grounds of the latter are the result of a dam on the Sweetbourne stream.

St Mary's Church is 0.5 miles (0.80 km) east of the village. It is a Grade I listed building and includes stained glass by John Piper.

== Transport ==
The village was bypassed to the east in 2005 by the A21, which previously ran through the village. The decision caused some controversy due to its location in the High Weald Area of Outstanding Natural Beauty.

The closest railway stations (both about 3 miles (4.8 km) distant) are Frant and Wadhurst on the north-south London to Hastings line. Most bus services are provided by Autocar with Hams Travel operating school service 2. Many services were operated by Countryliner until the operator ceased trading in 2013.
