= River Teise =

River in Kent, England

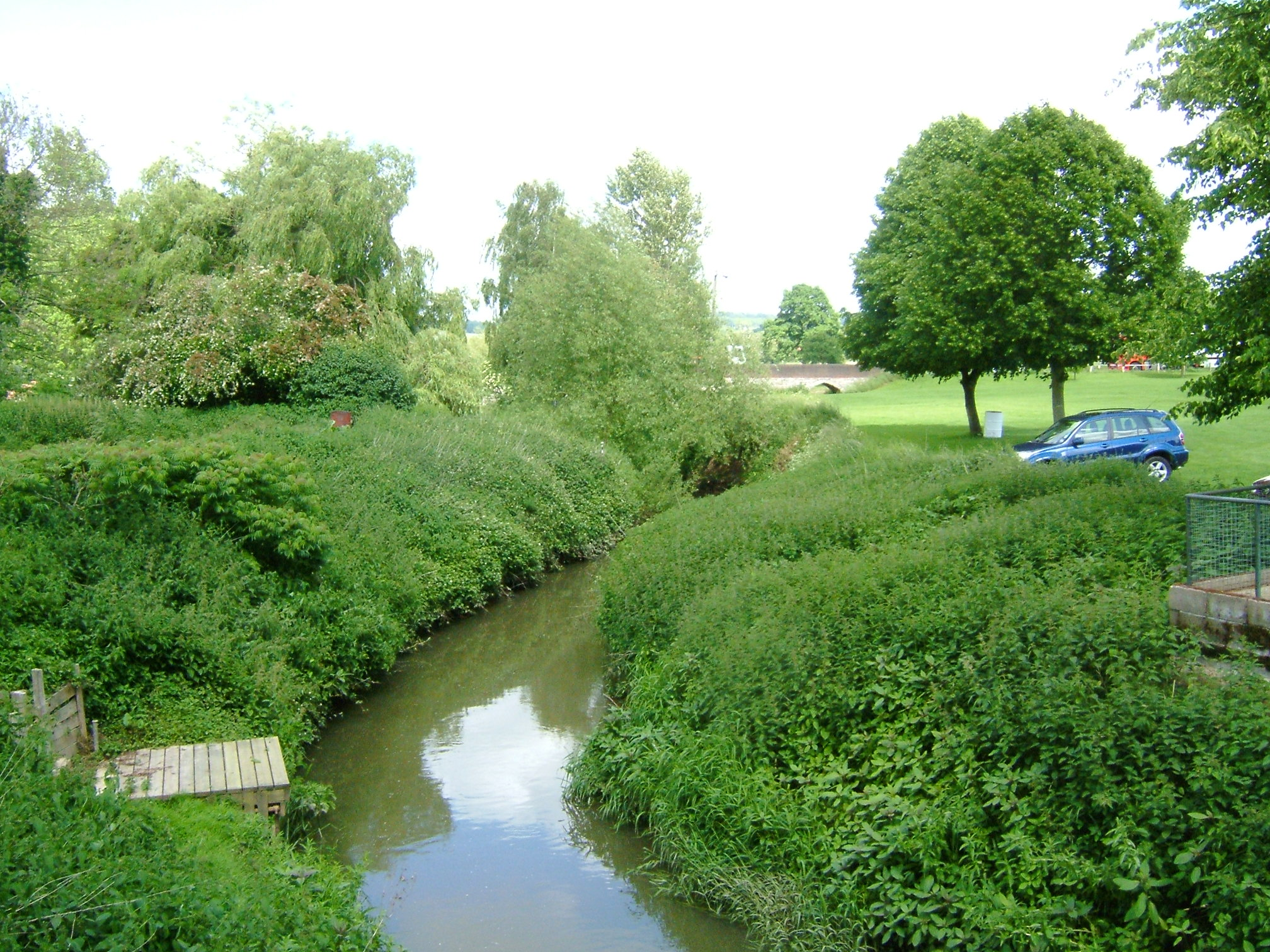
- Lesser Teise nearing the River Medway near Yalding (Twyford Bridge in the distance)

- Rivers of Kent

Physical characteristics
- Source
  - location: Dunorlan Park in Tunbridge Wells
- Mouth
  - location: Major stream River Beult at Hunton, minor stream River Medway at Yalding

The River Teise (/ˈtiːz/ TEEZ, /ˈtaɪs/ TYCE) is a tributary of the River Medway in Kent, England.

== Course ==
The source of the Teise is in Dunorlan Park in Tunbridge Wells. From there the river flows eastwards past Bayham Abbey and then through Lamberhurst. 2 miles (3.2 km) downstream of Lamberhurst the small River Bewl, on which is the reservoir Bewl Water, joins the Teise.

The Teise bifurcates 1 1/4 miles (2.0 km) south west of the village of Marden, passing either side of a low ridge. The Lesser Teise flows for about 4 miles (6.4 km) before joining the River Beult at Hunton. The Greater Teise, now carrying only minor quantities, flows for about 5 miles (8.0 km) to the River Medway at Twyford Bridge, upstream of Yalding, formerly the site of a double ford over both the Medway and Teise rivers. The Beult flows through Yalding, then also joins the Medway about 6 furlongs (1.2 km) below Twyford Bridge.

Like many other rivers in southern England the River Teise was subject to a Land Drainage Improvement Scheme during the 1950s. The River Lesser Teise was widened, straightened and deepened from Horsmonden to the River Beult confluence. Hence it now carries much of the flow.

The Greater Teise upstream of where the Lesser Teise bifurcates, and the section downstream of Marden to its confluence with the River Medway was also "improved". A number of weirs were built at the time of this work, and still exist today. They split the flows between channels and some are also gauging stations.

Some of the former meanders of the Lesser Teise can still be seen within retained woodland areas. These provide a record of the natural character of the River Teise, as does the 4 km (2.5 mi) bifurcated section of the Greater Teise, which was left largely untouched.

== Water quality ==
The Environment Agency measure water quality of the river systems in England. Each is given an overall ecological status, which may be one of five levels: high, good, moderate, poor and bad. There are several components that are used to determine this, including biological status, which looks at the quantity and varieties of invertebrates, angiosperms and fish. Chemical status, which compares the concentrations of various chemicals against known safe concentrations, is rated good or fail.

Water quality of the River Teise in 2019:

Section	Ecological Status	Chemical Status	Overall Status	Length	Catchment	Channel
Lower Teise	Moderate	Fail	Moderate	21.542 km (13.386 mi)	37.302 km^{2} (14.402 sq mi)	Heavily modified
Teise and Lesser Teise	Moderate	Fail	Moderate	24.398 km (15.160 mi)	34.159 km^{2} (13.189 sq mi)	Heavily modified
Teise at Lamberhurst	Poor	Fail	Poor	9.041 km (5.618 mi)	14.266 km^{2} (5.508 sq mi)	Heavily modified
Tributary of Teise	Moderate	Fail	Moderate	3.869 km (2.404 mi)	24.093 km^{2} (9.302 sq mi)	
Upper Teise	Moderate	Fail	Moderate	8.774 km (5.452 mi)	26.697 km^{2} (10.308 sq mi)	Heavily modified

== Watermills ==
The River Teise and its tributaries powered a number of watermills. From source to mouth they were:-

=== Standings Mill, Broomhill, Tunbridge Wells ===
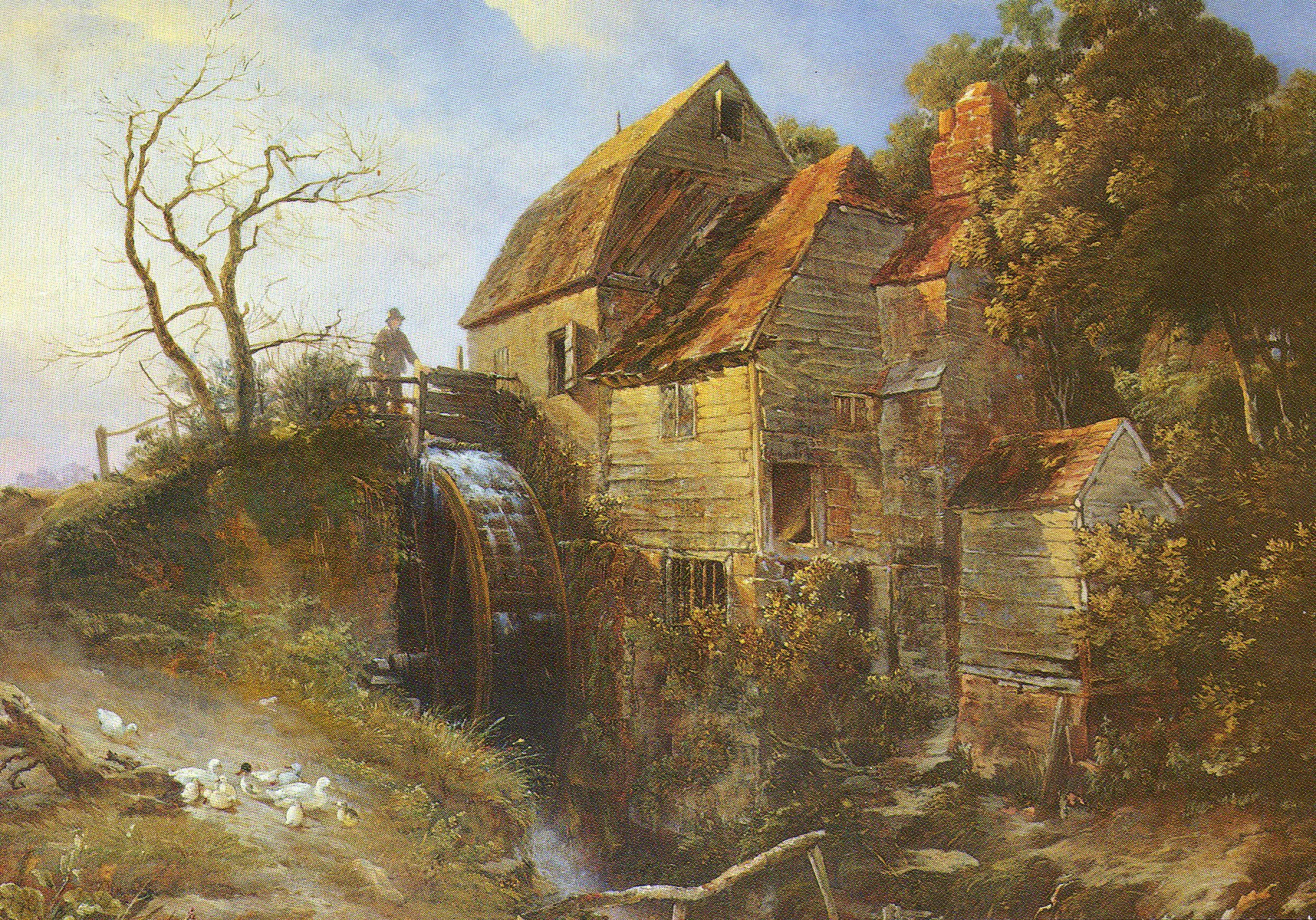
Painting of Standings Mill by C T Dodd

This was a corn mill, driven by an overshot waterwheel. A painting of the mill by Charles Tattershall Dodd (1815–78) can be seen in Tunbridge Wells Museum & Art Gallery.

=== Bayham Abbey Forge ===
TQ 642 366 51°06′20″N 0°20′41″E

This forge was in operation in 1520, when it was leased by William Wybarne. It was still at work in 1667, the pond survives.

=== Gloucester Furnace, Lamberhurst ===
TQ 6615 3596 51°05′54″N 0°22′24″E

This furnace was built in 1695 by William Benge. In 1700 the owner was Samuel Gott. The furnace produced 200 tons of iron in 1717 and John Legas was working it in partnership with William Harrison. William Collins and George Matthews leased the furnace in 1782 but it ceased production c.1787. There was a boring mill marked on Budgen's map of 1795.

=== Hoadly Forge, Lamberhurst ===
TQ 6622 3617 51°06′01″N 0°22′28″E

Hoadly Forge was built in 1548 by Alexander Collins. It was sold by Stephen Collins to Richard Filmer in 1584. In 1614 it was owned by Sir Edward Filmer and leased to Thomas Sanders and Thomas Ballard. The forge was bought by William Benge in 1694. The railings around St. Paul's Cathedral were cast here.

=== Furnace Mill, Lamberhurst ===
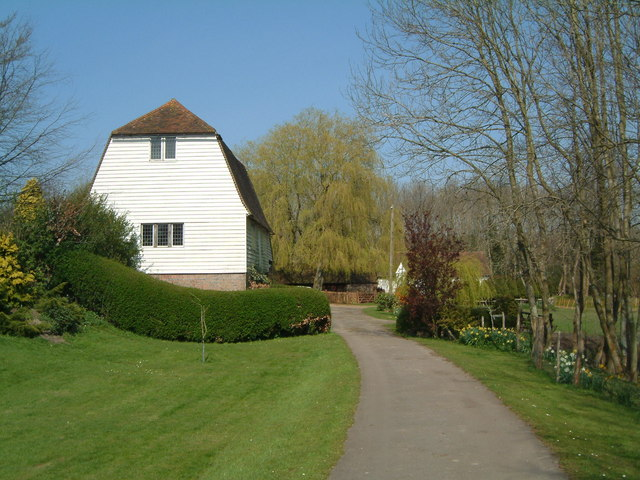
Furnace Mill.

TQ 661 361 51°06′00″N 0°22′24″E

This was a corn mill; the building survives today converted to a dwelling, devoid of machinery except the sack hoist. It was marked on Bugden's map of 1795 and the surviving building dates from c.1812

=== Hope Mill, Goudhurst ===
TQ 708 372 51°06′31″N 0°26′27″E

This corn mill has now been house converted. It latterly worked with two waterwheels. The original wheel against the mill building and the later one set away from the mill. Both wheels were breastshot.

The older wheel

Only the cast iron hub of this wheel remains, on a wooden axle of some 18 inches (460 mm)diameter. The wheel had eight wooden spokes per side. This breast shot wheel was 13 feet 9 inches (4.19 m) diameter by 6 feet (1.83 m) wide, with 48 floats mounted on a cast iron rim. This wheel drove three pairs of millstones by a layshaft.

The newer wheel

This wheel was an overshot wheel, 9 feet 2 inches (2.79 m) diameter and 9 feet 3 inches (2.82 m) wide, constructed of cast iron, carried on an 8 inches (200 mm) diameter cast iron axle which was unusually long, as it had to pass over the tail race of the other waterwheel.

=== Goudhurst Paper Mill ===
TQ 716 392 approx 51°07′34″N 0°27′12″E

This mill stood on the parish boundary of Horsmonden and Goudhurst. It was first mentioned in 1683, possibly replacing a fulling mill. Owners include George Culvin in 1716, Thomas West in 1725 and Edward Blackwell in the 1730s and 1740s. The mill had closed by 1755.

=== Marden (Pattenden) Mill, Marden ===
TQ 735 456 51°10′59″N 0°29′01″E

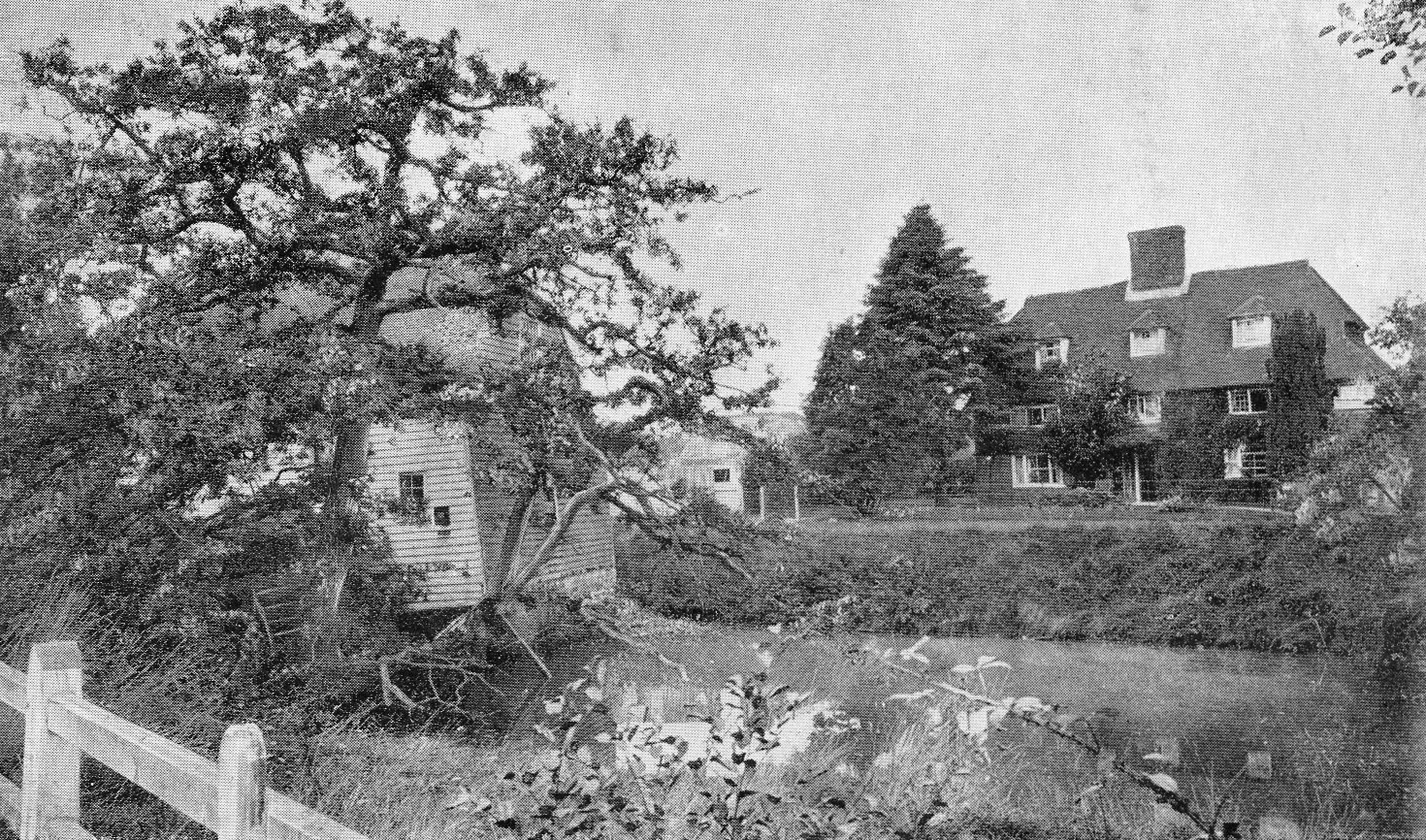
Marden Mill.

Marden, or Pattenden Mill, was a corn mill on the Lesser Teise. It was a small timber-framed building of three storeys, clad in white painted weatherboarding. The mill was driven by an overshot waterwheel.

It was run by the Hammond Family, firstly by William, who died in 1808. Then by his son William until his death in 1861. William Jr was followed by his son Henry, who died in 1892 and the mill then ceased working. It was demolished in 1912.

== Watermills on the tributaries ==
The watermills on the River Bewl are discussed in that article, other watermills on the tributaries were as below.

=== Benhall Mill, Frant ===
TQ 607 376 51°06′54″N 0°17′49″E

This corn mill stood on the site of an old furnace mill. The forge was working from 1557 to 1653 but disused in 1667. Benhall Mill was not marked on Budgeon's map of 1724. In 1803 the miller was Richard Jones, followed by his son Stephen until c.1845, then Christopher and Henry Smith in partnership until 1870, then Henry alone until 1887. The mill may have continued to grind for Benhall Mill Farm after this date. The remains of the mill were demolished in 1964.

=== Brookland Forge, Frant ===
TQ 618 349 51°05′26″N 0°18′41″E

This forge was sold by Humphrey Lewknor to John Barham in 1521. It remained in the Barhams' ownership until it was abandoned some time between 1629 and 1640. In 1574 Thomas Gresham leased the forge, and sub-leased it to John Carpenter. In 1610 it was leased to Thomas Saunders. There is evidence that the forge had an overshot waterwheel. The dam has been recorded as 65 metres (71 yd) long and 1.5 metres (4 ft 11 in) high.

=== Verredge Forge, Frant ===
TQ 621 352 51°05′35″N 0°18′57″E

This forge was also owned by the Barham family. It was sold by Humphrey Lewknor to John Barham in 1521. It was leased by Christopher Darrell in 1573 and Thomas Saunders in 1610. The forge was last mentioned in 1642. The dam has been recorded as 120 metres (130 yd) long and 3 metres (9 ft 10 in) high.

=== Bartley Mill, Frant ===
TQ 632 357 51°05′50″N 0°19′54″E

Bartley Mill stands on the Winn Stream, just within the parish of Frant, Sussex. Once the property of Bayham Abbey, it was last worked commercially in the 1900s and was restored to working order in 1990. In 1851 the miller was Leonard Latter. The Arnold family were millers here before taking Branbridges Mill, East Peckham in 1890. The last recorded miller was John Ballard in 1905. The mill is open to visitors by appointment.

=== Bedgebury Forge, Goudhurst ===
TQ 727 357 51°05′40″N 0°28′02″E

The site of this forge was destroyed by the construction of the Hawkhurst Branch.

=== Bedgebury Furnace, Goudhurst ===
TQ 730 347 51°05′07″N 0°28′16″E

The site of the Furnace floor is adjacent to the main farm Buildings at Furnace Farm. The Furnace lies just inside Cranbrook Parish. The only Furnace in the Parish, it was owned by Sir Alexander Culpeper in 1574 and let to Sir Richard Baker in the second half of the reign of Queen Elizabeth I. It was let to John Dunnednoll in 1610 and in 1637 John Browne was working the forge - there was a dispute about the felling of wood for use at the iron works. George Browne was working the forge in 1657. The forge was disused by 1664, when it was then repaired, but unoccupied again in 1680. The furnace was recommissioned during the Peninsular War due to the high demand for iron for military and naval purposes, however by 1815 the furnace had all but died again, turning its work from smelt to casting; however its production was limited, as its location made transport costs high compared to furnaces in the Midlands and north-west Kent. A modified furnace continued in use at Bedgebury for some time for the firing of clay and bricks, produced by the various workshops at Cranbrook Pottery; however the advent of production in the Midlands with better availability of power, transport, labour and materials all but ended hopes of retaining industry in the area. Bedgebury furnace built new oast kilns in 1880 and again in 1912, for hops from the surrounding hop gardens. The oast kilns remain to this day. The original bloomery or hammer pond has now silted up but remains as a distinct flat flood plain which clearly defines the approximately 20 acres (8.1 ha) that originally held the water reservoir. A very substantial long pond bay/dam runs north–south and can be seen clearly, nearly 130 metres (430 ft) long, 8 metres (26 ft 3 in) high and 20 metres (65 ft 7 in) wide. The sluice has long been dismantled, however the race is clearly visible to walkers using the bridleway that crosses the river Teise on a stone bridge. The mill pool is also largely silted up, however immediately north of the pool lies the hammer floor displaying the clear relief of the original working layout. West of the site is a very large moat which originally held the iron keep.

=== Brenchley Furnace, Horsmonden ===
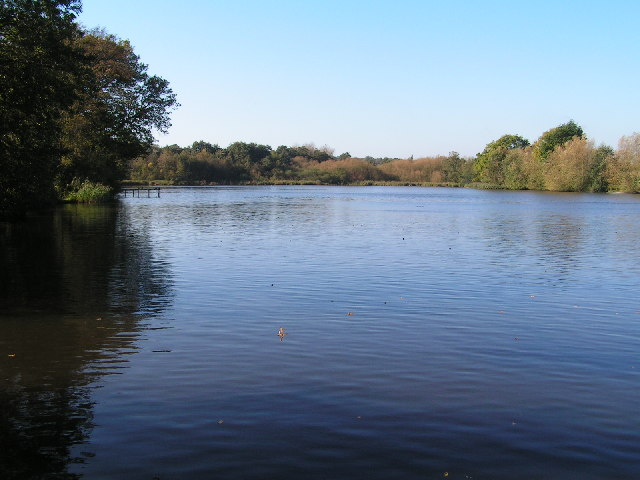
Furnace pond.

TQ 695 412 51°08′41″N 0°25′27″E

An old site, the Furnace Pond remains today, having an area of some 30 acres (12 ha). The dam across the valley is some 140 yards (130 m) in length. the head available being some 30 feet (9.14 m)'.

This furnace was first mentioned in 1574, when the owner was Thomas Bartell or Brattle. In 1579 it was leased by Henry and Thomas Darrell to Thomas Dyke, with Brattle having an interest in the property. In 1588 the furnace was leased by William Ashburnham and sub-leased to Thomas Johnson, a gun-founder. In 1596 the furnace was owned by Sir Thomas Waller, and leased to John Iden and Robert Pothill. The furnace was leased by Thomas Browne in 1604 and later by John Browne, who held the office of King's Gunfounder from 1615 to 1681. Some 200 men were employed at the furnace in 1613. The furnace was working to at least 1667 and in 1744 there was a boring mill run by one Harrison.

== See also ==
- Medway watermills article
- List of watermills in the United Kingdom
