= River Bewl =

River in Sussex and Kent, England

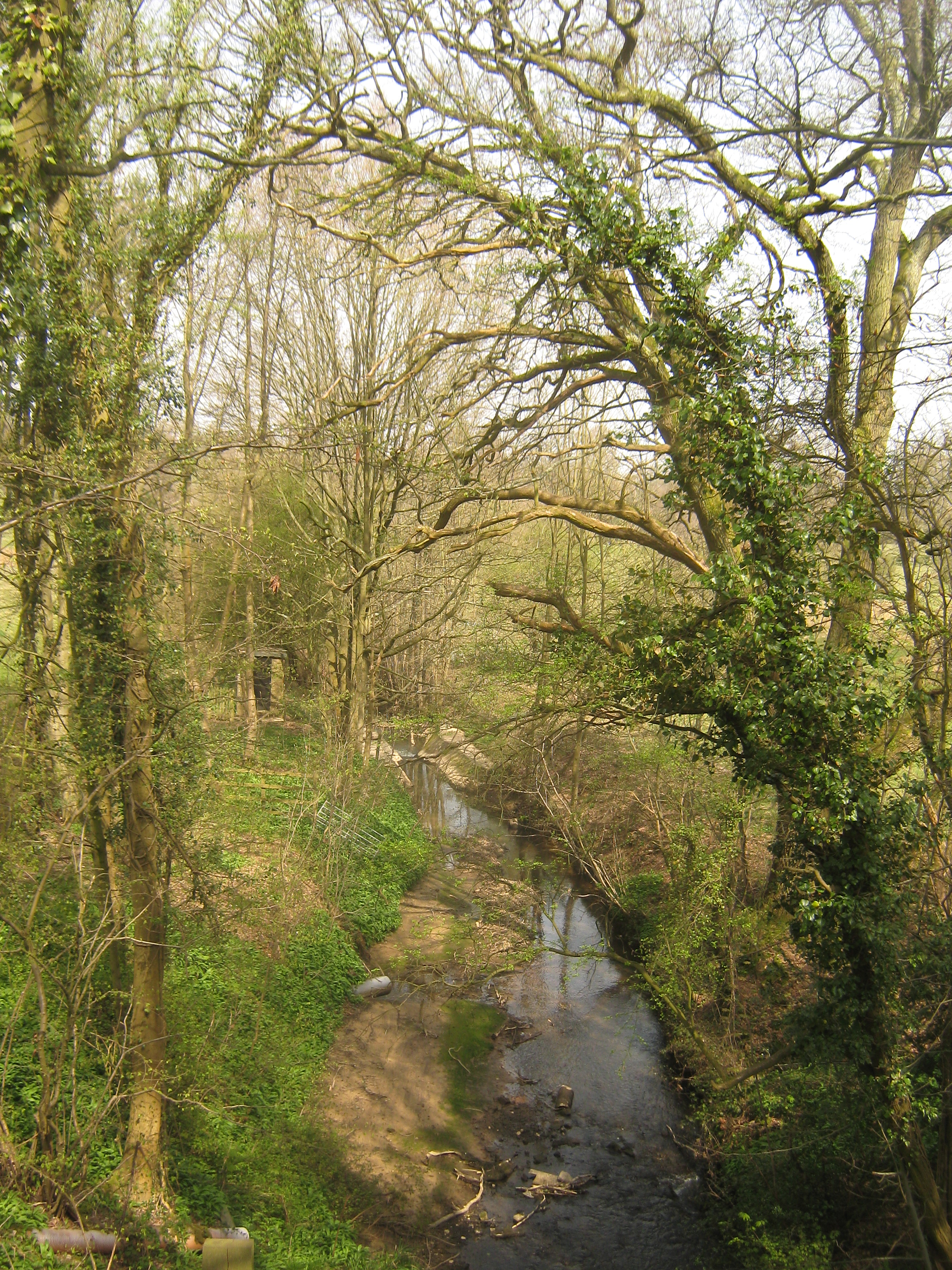

Physical characteristics
- Source: Streams feeding Bewl Water
- Mouth: River Teise
  - coordinates: 51°06′16″N 0°25′21″E

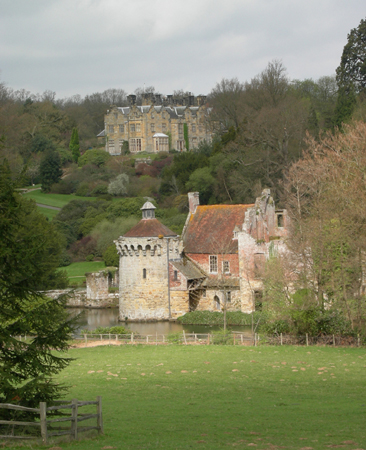
Scotney Castle

The River Bewl is a tributary of the River Teise in Kent, England. Its headwaters are in the High Weald, in Sussex between Lamberhurst, Wadhurst and Flimwell. The valley is deeply incised into Tunbridge Wells red sandstone, with a base of alluvium on Wadhurst clay.

Between 1973 and 1975, a 900-metre dam (980 yd) was built across the Bewl valley, cutting off the headwaters. This formed Bewl Water, a 30-metre-deep storage reservoir (98 ft), with a surface area of 308 hectares (760 acres). In times of good flow, water is extracted from the River Medway at Yalding and pumped through pipes into Bewl Water, where it is stored for times of heavy water demand.

The River Bewl passes under the A21 road and by Scotney Castle. At Finchcocks it enters the River Teise.

== Watermills ==
The River Bewl and its tributaries powered a number of watermills. From source to mouth they were:-

=== Dunsters Mill, Ticehurst ===
TQ 689 323 51°03′54″N 0°24′41″E

The site of this watermill now lies in the middle of Bewl Water. It was one of those very rare watermills that was an overdrift mill, with the millstones driven from above. This arrangement is more commonly found in windmills. When Bewl Water was built, the fourteenth century Mill House was dismantled and re-erected at Three Legged Cross, Wadhurst.

The overshot waterwheel was some 12 feet (3.66 m) diameter by 6 feet 8 inches (2.03 m) wide and was carried on a wooden axle. it drove a cast iron pit wheel 10 feet 8 inches (3.25 m) diameter with 112 wooden cogs. A 5 inches (130 mm) square cast iron layshaft was driven which powered at least two pairs of millstones.

=== Chingley Forge, Goudhurst ===
TQ 682 335 51°04′34″N 0°24′07″E

The site of this ancient forge mill is now covered by the dam of Bewl Water. Chingley forge was built sometime between 1574 and 1589, when Richard Ballard was the tenant of Thomas Darell. Edward Pelham and James Thatcher bought the forge c.1595. In 1637 the forge was leased to Henry Darell. The forge seems to have been disused in 1653 and 1664, but was at work in 1717, producing 46 tons of iron in that year. It was marked on Budgen's map of 1724 and in 1726 the tenant was John Legas. The dam has been recorded as 100 metres (110 yd) long.

=== Chingley Furnace, Goudhurst ===
TQ 684 327 51°04′08″N 0°24′16″E

The site of this ancient blast furnace is now covered by the dam of Bewl Water. It was in the Culpeper family in the sixteenth century, Thomas Collepepper holding lands in Chingley in fief from Henry VIII in 1544. The land had formerly been in the ownership of the Abbey of Boxley, which had been dissolved. The furnace was built between 1558 and 1565. In 1574 it was in the possession of Thomas Darell and the tenant was Thomas Dyke. It was sold by Edward Culpeper in 1595. In 1597 Thomas Dyke of Pembury leased Chingley Furnace to Richard Ballard of Wadhurst, and his sons Thomas and Richard. The forge was powered by an undershot waterwheel. The sites were excavated in 1968/9 by the Wealden Iron Research Group. There is evidence that Chingley Forge was a hammer mill at some time, possibly as early as the first half of the thirteenth century. The dam was recorded as 50 metres (55 yd) long and 2.5 metres (8 ft 2 in) high. When the site was excavated in 1970, the remains of an overshot waterwheel 8 feet (2.44 m) diameter and 1 foot (0.30 m) wide were found.

== See also ==
- Medway watermills article
