= Bewl Water =

Reservoir in South East England

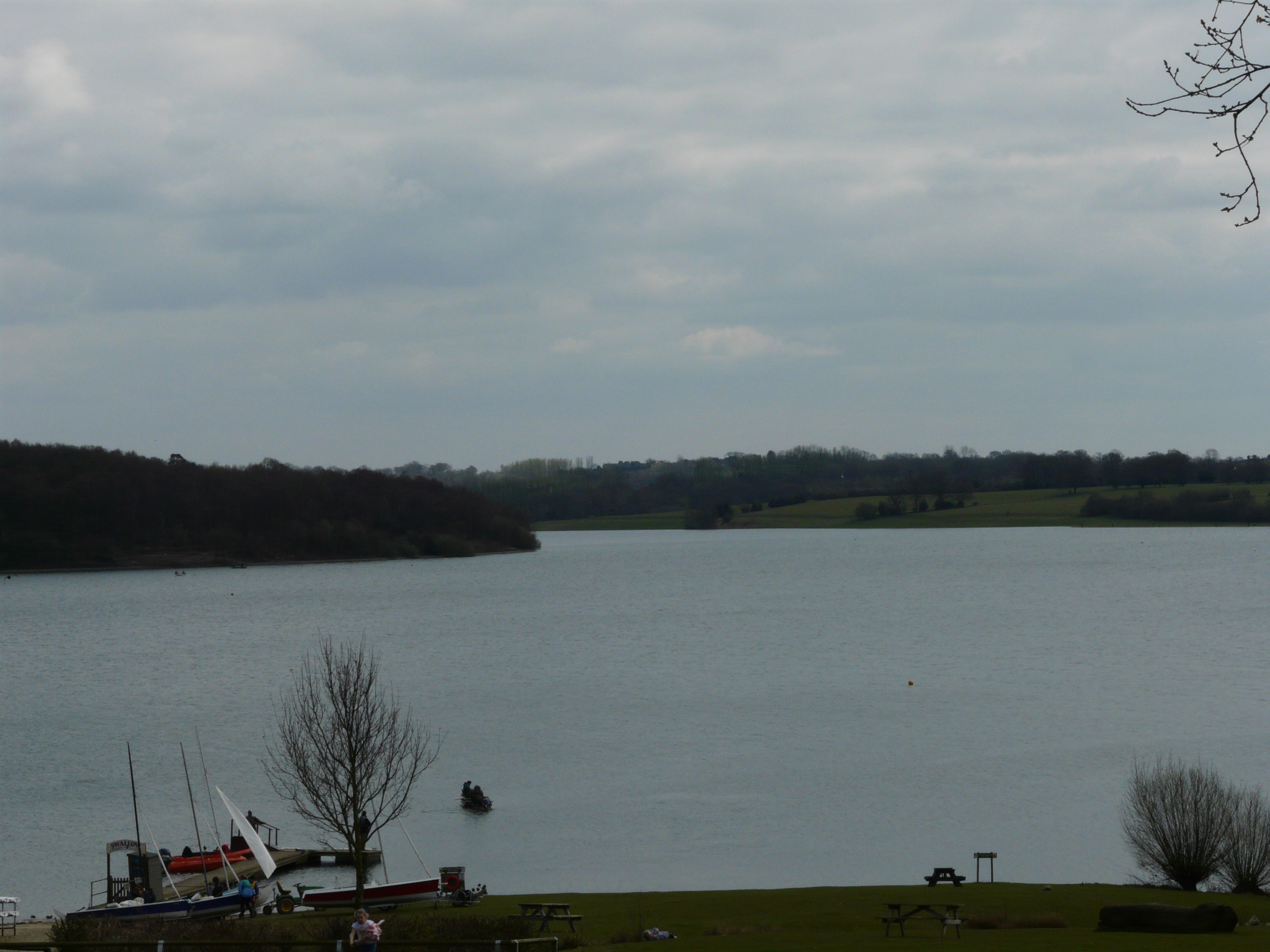
- Bewl Water

- Location within Kent
- Location: Kent/East Sussex
- Coordinates: 51.06997°N 0.39508°E
- Lake type: Reservoir
- Basin countries: United Kingdom
- Shore length^{1}: 20.4 km (12.7 mi)
- Settlements: Wadhurst
- Website: www.bewlwater.co.uk
- ^{1} Shore length is not a well-defined measure.

Bewl Water shown within Kent (grid reference TQ679328)

Bewl Water is a reservoir in the valley of the River Bewl, straddling the boundary between Kent and East Sussex in England. It is about 2 miles (3.2 km) south of Lamberhurst, Kent. The reservoir was part of a project to increase the supply of water in the area. It supplies Southern Water's customers in the towns of Tunbridge Wells and Hastings.

Medway Water (Bewl Bridge Reservoir) Act 1968
- Act of Parliament
- Parliament of the United Kingdom
- Long title: An Act to authorise the Medway Water Board to construct works and to acquire lands; to empower the Board and the Mid Kent Water Company to enter into agreements for certain purposes; and for other purposes.
- Citation: 1968 c. xxxiii

Dates
- Royal assent: 26 July 1968

Text of statute as originally enacted

The reservoir was authorised by the Medway Water (Bewl Bridge Reservoir) Act 1968 (c. xxxiii). Work to construct the reservoir began in 1973 with the damming and subsequent flooding of the Bewl River valley. It was completed in 1975, having been filled with over 31,300 million litres of water, with a total project cost of £11 million. It is now the largest body of inland water in Southeast England.

In winter, when the flow in the River Medway exceeds 275 million litres per day, river water is pumped to the reservoir for storage. There is an outlined plan to raise the water level by a further three metres with intentions of increasing the yield by up to 30% to help with the growing water demand in Southeast England. This will, however, put further demands on the River Medway to supply the additional water required, with the potential for environmental degradation in the river and the ecosystems that it supports.

== Leisure use ==
Bewl Water Outdoor Centre hosts a variety of outdoor activities on and around the reservoir. These include sailing, windsurfing, rowing, sculling, canoeing, kayaking, trout & predator fishing, and paddleboarding. A floating obstacle course is also available on the reservoir.

Away from the water, numerous walking and cycling routes surround the 12½-mile Round Reservoir Route.
