= River Medway =

River in South East England

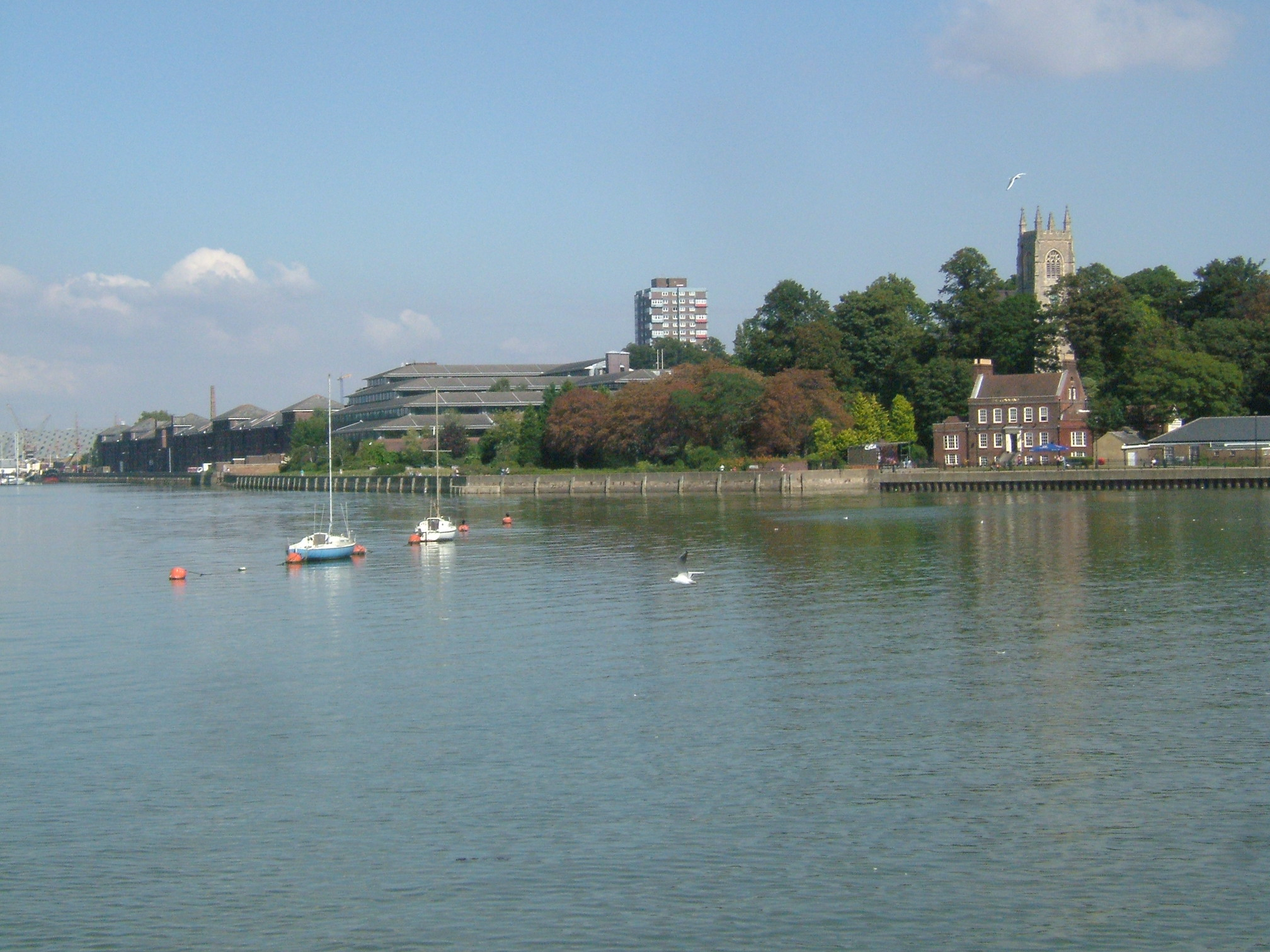
- Medway at Gun Wharf, Chatham

- Rivers in Kent, showing the Medway

Location
- Country: England
- Region: South East England, West Sussex, Kent
- District: Mid Sussex, Sevenoaks, Tonbridge and Malling, Medway and Maidstone

Physical characteristics
- Source
  - location: Turners Hill, West Sussex
  - coordinates: 51°06′25″N 0°5′37″W
  - elevation: 489 ft (149 m)
- Mouth: Thames Estuary
  - location: Garrison Point, Sheerness, Kent
  - coordinates: 51°26′57″N 0°44′18″E
- Length: 70 mi (113 km)
- Basin size: 930 sq mi (2,400 km^{2})
- Discharge
  - location: Teston
  - average: 11.08 m^{3}/s (391 cu ft/s)
  - minimum: 0.43 m^{3}/s (15 cu ft/s)24 August 1978
  - maximum: 358.6 m^{3}/s (12,660 cu ft/s)16 September 1968

Basin features
- Tributaries
  - left: Eden, Bourne, Wateringbury Stream, East Malling Stream, other minor streams
  - right: Teise, Beult, Loose Stream, Len, other minor streams
- Designation

Ramsar Wetland
- Official name: Medway Estuary & Marshes
- Designated: 15 December 1993

The River Medway is a river in South East England. It rises in the High Weald, West Sussex and flows through Tonbridge, Maidstone and the Medway conurbation in Kent, before emptying into the Thames Estuary near Sheerness, a total distance of 70 miles (113 km). About 13 miles (21 km) of the river lies in East Sussex, with the remainder being in Kent.

The Medway has a catchment area of 930 square miles (2,409 km^{2}), the second largest in southern England after the Thames. The map opposite shows only the major tributaries: a more detailed map shows the extensive network of smaller streams feeding into the main river. Those tributaries rise from points along the North Downs, the Weald and Ashdown Forest.

== Tributaries ==
The major tributaries are:

- River Eden
- River Bourne, known in the past as the Shode or Busty
- River Teise, major sub-tributary River Bewl
- River Beult
- Loose Stream
- River Len

Minor tributaries include:

- Wateringbury Stream
- East Malling Stream
- River Grom

Former minor tributaries include the Old Bourne River, which flowed through The Brook, Chatham (not to be confused with the main tributary River Bourne).

The river and its tributaries flow through largely rural areas, Tonbridge, Maidstone and Medway being the exceptions. The Medway itself initially flows in a west–east direction south of the North Downs; at the confluence of the River Beult, however, it turns north and breaks through the North Downs at the Medway Gap, a steep and narrow valley near Rochester, before its final section to the sea.

Until 1746, the river was not navigable above Maidstone. Below that point each village on the river had its wharf or wharves: at Halling, Snodland, New Hythe and Aylesford. Cargoes included corn, fodder, fruit, stone and timber.

In 1746, improvements to the channel meant that barges of 40 long tons (41 t) could reach East Farleigh, Yalding and even Tonbridge. In 1828, the channel was further improved up to Leigh. There are eleven locks on the river. The lowest, opened in 1792, is at Allington, and is the tidal limit. The others are at East Farleigh, Teston, Hampstead Lane, Stoneham Old Lock (disused), Sluice Weir Lock, Oak Weir Lock, East Lock, Porter's, Eldridge's and Town Lock in Tonbridge. The locks will take craft up to 80 feet (24 m) by 18 feet (5.5 m), and vessels with a draft of 4 feet (1.2 m) can navigate the river. The shallowest point is just below Sluice Weir Lock, which is prone to silting after heavy rain.

Small craft such as canoes can sometimes travel as far as Penshurst. The stretch from Leigh to Allington is known as the Medway Navigation, and is 19 miles (31 km) in length. The Environment Agency is the navigation authority.

== Estuary ==
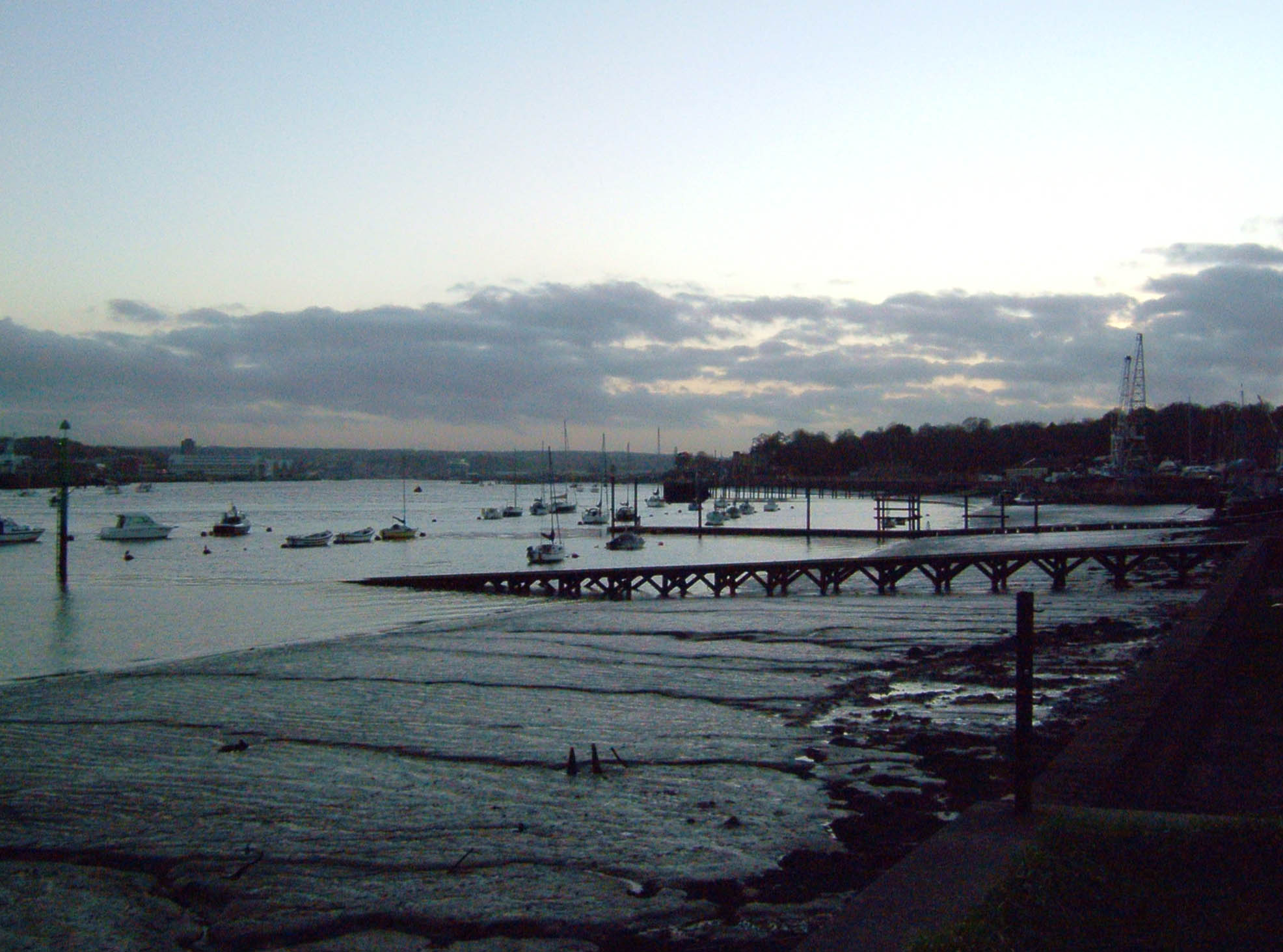
Dusk at Lower Upnor on the Medway Estuary

Downstream of the Medway bridges (M2, HS1) the river comprises a sequence of tidal reaches:

- Wickham Reach
- Tower Reach
- Bridge Reach
- Limehouse Reach
- Chatham Reach
- Upnor Reach
- Short Reach
- Gillingham Reach
- Pinup Reach
- Long Reach
- Kethole Reach
- Saltpan Reach

=== Stangate Creek ===
One of the channels on the southern side of the estuary, Stangate Creek, is the subject of a painting by William Turner. In a location described as "opposite the Isle of Grain, Sharpfleet Creek, and the lower-end of the Hope", a quarantine site for ships was proclaimed on 16 September 1709, during an outbreak of the plague. The area had been leased to oyster fisherman, so compensation was paid to them. Nearly 150 ships quarantined there in the first six months of 1712, and the site was again used between 1721 and 1743.

In 1918 to 1920, damages were sought for damage done to an oyster fishery in Stangate Creek.

== River crossings ==
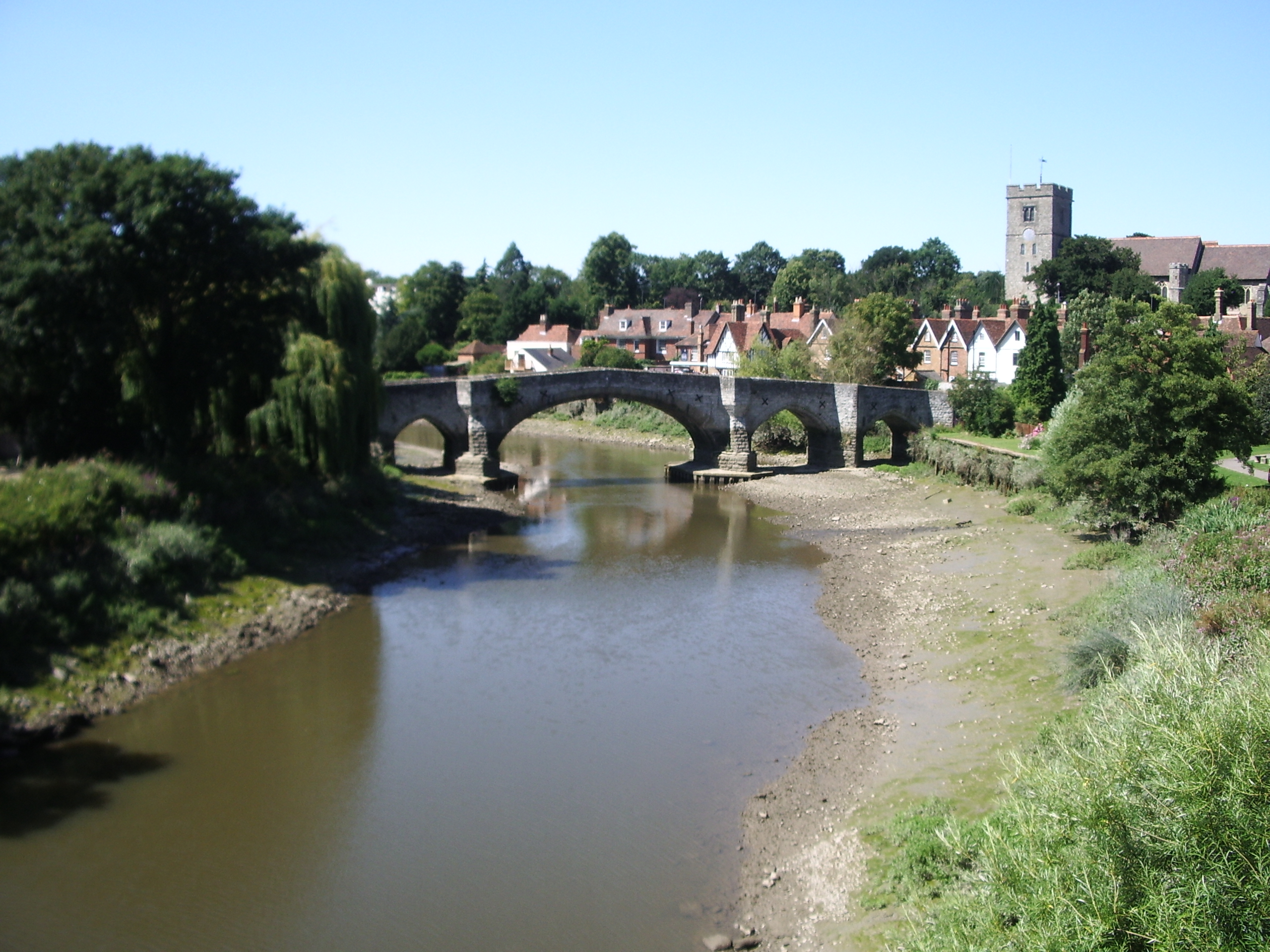
Medieval bridge at Aylesford

Until 1996, with the building of the Medway Tunnel, the lowest public crossing of the Medway was at Rochester, where there has been a bridge since Roman times. In the 14th century the Wardens and Commonalty of Rochester Bridge were instituted by Sir John de Cobham to pay for the rebuilding and upkeep of the bridge. Until 1963 the nearest crossing to Rochester Bridge was the 14th-century bridge at Aylesford, 12 miles (19 km) upstream. Since then the following additional crossings have come into use:

- 1963: A viaduct over the river was built south of Rochester to carry the first section of the M2 motorway. In 2003 this was widened to two separate spans.
- Between 1963 and 1996 the M20 was built, with a bridge over the Medway south of Aylesford.
- 1996: The Medway Tunnel became the river's lowest public crossing, connecting Gillingham to Strood. The four-lane tunnel was constructed using the immersed tube method, and was partially paid for by Rochester Bridge Trust, the successor to the Wardens and Commonalty.
- 2003: A railway bridge 0.8 miles (1.3 km) long, with a central span of 498 feet (152 m), was constructed for High Speed 1. The railway bridge lies parallel to the M2 motorway bridges.
- 2017: A new road bridge from the A228 between Holborough and Halling across to Hall Road, Wouldham, to facilitate the development of Peters Village.

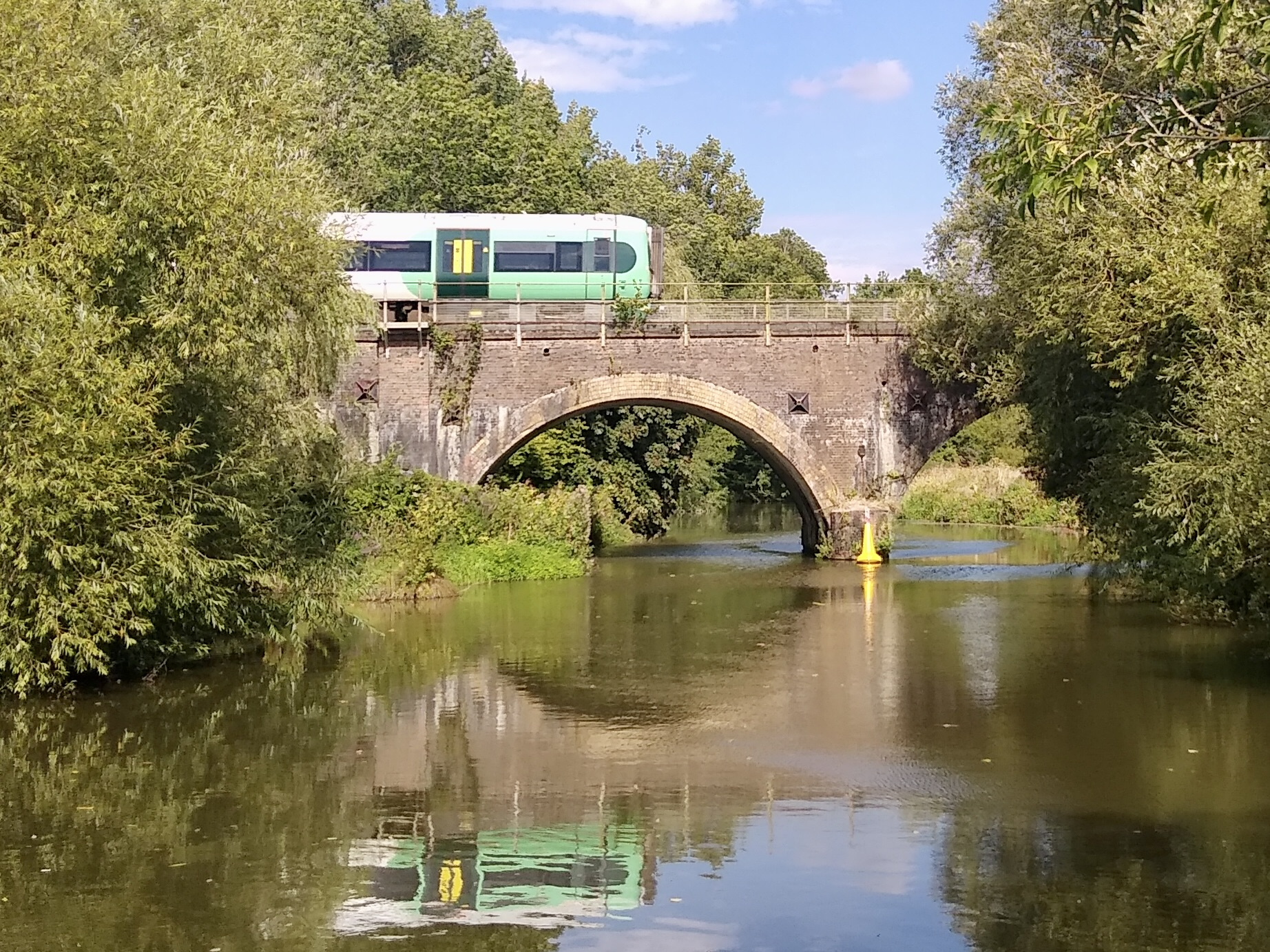
The Redhill–Tonbridge railway line crosses the Medway between Leigh and Tonbridge stations.

Three other major crossings are at Tonbridge, where bridges carry the A227 road and a rail link over the river; there is also a two-span viaduct which takes the A21 over the Medway Valley near Haysden.

The lowest crossing of the Medway are two cable tunnels between the Isle of Grain and Chetney marshes. These were built between 1973 and 1976 in anticipation of the commissioning of Grain power station. The tunnels are 1700 m long, 2.54 m in diameter and between 34 and 47 m below ordnance datum; each carries a 400kV electricity circuit. There is no public access.

== Ports ==
- Sheerness
- Chatham, Kent

== Flooding ==
The middle section of the Medway above Tonbridge, partly because of the various tributaries entering the river in this stretch – in particular the River Eden – has always been subject to extensive flooding. Tonbridge has suffered frequent flooding over the centuries, so much so that the higher part of the town to the north is called "Dryhill". Flood protection measures have therefore been taken. In 1981, a flood barrier was constructed downstream from Leigh to protect Tonbridge, which had been severely affected by the flooding of 1968. During periods of high flow, the flow is controlled by impounding the water and allowing up to 1 square mile (2.6 km^{2}) of farmland upstream of the barrier to flood. However, this did not prevent significant flooding in Tonbridge in winter 2013–14. In recent years the village of Yalding, about 12 km downstream at the confluence with the River Beult, has been more prone to flooding than Tonbridge.

== Footpaths ==
The Medway Valley Walk follows the river from Rochester to Tonbridge along the bank most of the way above Allington. It starts on the Saxon Shore Way at Rochester. The North Downs Way crosses the river using the Medway Viaduct or motorway bridge. The Greensand Way crosses the river at Yalding. At West Peckham, it is joined by the Wealdway which continues through Tonbridge, thus linking with the Eden Valley Walk. Maidstone Millennium River Park is a 10 kilometres (6 mi) walk from Teston Country Park to the Museum of Kent Life at Sandling. The park, built between 1998 and 2001, has transformed 18 acres (7.3 ha) of wasteland and three new footbridges have been built over the river.

== History ==
Ancient sites abound throughout the length of the River Medway. The area around Aylesford is a notable Stone Age site where the Medway megaliths are a group of Neolithic chamber tombs including the Coldrum Stones and Kit's Coty House. Bronze Age ornaments and beakers have been found along the river; other burial sites and finds come from the pre-Roman Iron Age. The Romans left evidence of many villas in the lower Medway Valley; later Jutish burial sites have also been found.

The Domesday Book records many manors in the Medway valley. Castles became a feature of the landscape, including Rochester, Allington, Leeds (near Maidstone), and West Malling.

Two military actions are named after the river: the Battle of the Medway (43 CE, during the Roman invasion of Britain); and the Raid on the Medway, in 1667 during the Second Anglo-Dutch War.

In the 18th century Samuel Ireland published an illustrated book about a journey up the river, to the River Bewl at Bayham Abbey. The book's map shows some of the tributaries (unnamed). The illustrations include the castles at Queenborough, Upnor, Leybourne, Tonbridge and Hever; Penshurst Place; and the bridges at Teston, Maidstone, Aylesford, East Farleigh, Barming, Branbridges and Tonbridge. The hop fields in the vicinity of the latter are also described; and the easterly River Len, which then supplied Maidstone with its piped water. The book states that Within about two miles of Tunbridge the Medway branches out into several small streams, five of which unite at the town ... having each its stone bridge.

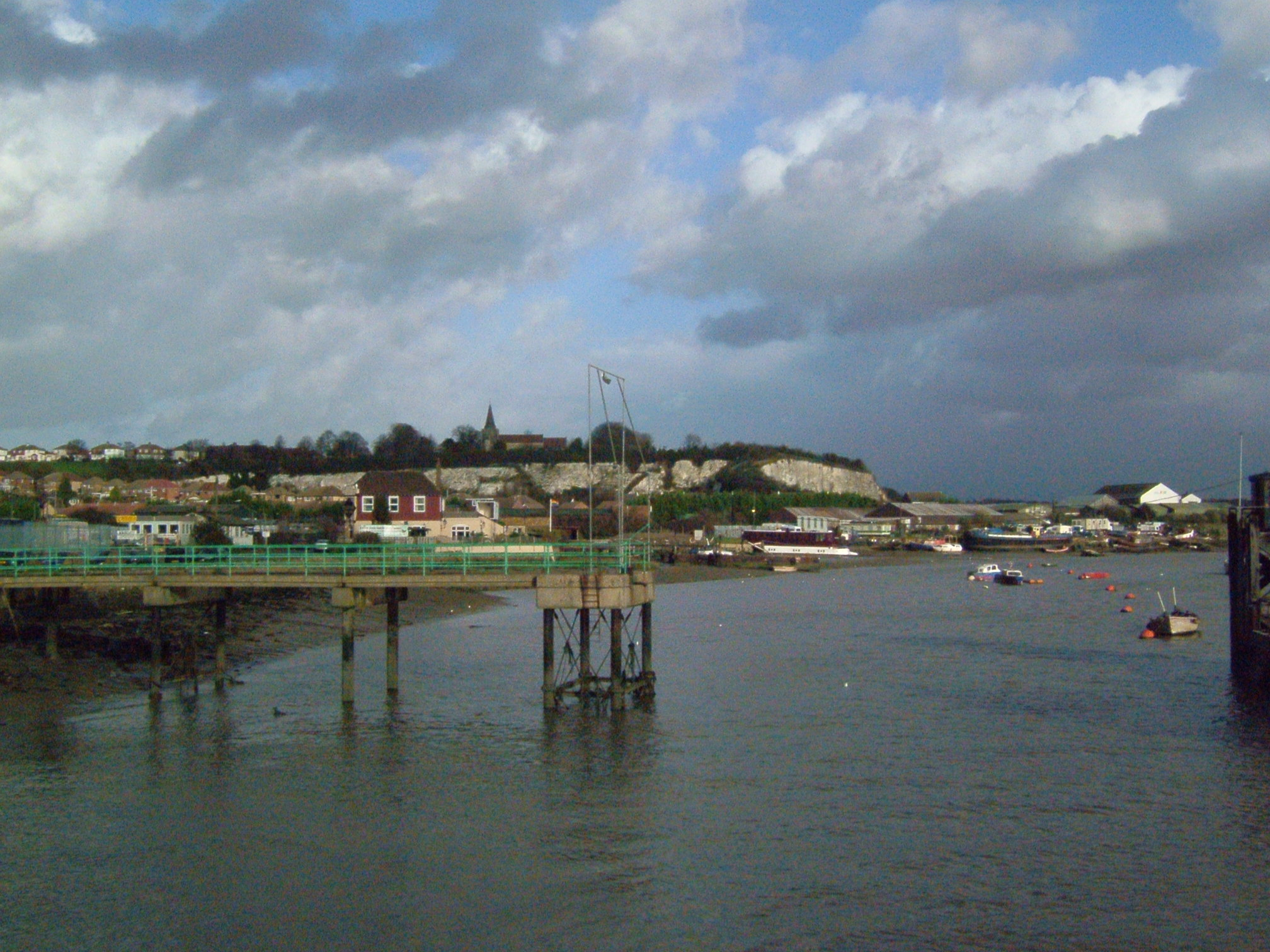
Frindsbury Church above the former entrance to the Thames and Medway Canal

The Thames and Medway Canal, duplicatively linking the estuary at Strood to Gravesend for adverse tides and weather was completed in 1824 but was not a commercial success; by 1849 the South Eastern Railway had taken over its tunnel through a hillside. The western part of the canal remained in use until 1934.

The Hartlake disaster of 1853 saw the deaths of 30 hop-pickers when a wagon carrying them crashed through the side of a rotten wooden bridge at Golden Green near Hadlow, throwing its passengers into the flood-swollen river.

In 1914 HMS Bulwark exploded while moored at Kethole Reach near Sheerness, killing 741 men with only 12 survivors. The following year HMS Princess Irene exploded in Saltpan Reach with the loss of 352 lives.

In 1942 the world's first test of a submarine oil pipeline was conducted with one laid across the Medway in Operation Pluto.

== Culture ==
The Medway's 'marriage' to the Thames is given extensive treatment by Edmund Spenser's The Faerie Queene in the 16th century (Book IV, Canto xi). Joseph Conrad describes the view up the Medway from the Thames Estuary in The Mirror of the Sea (1906).

For the 1999 film The Mummy the river was filmed at Chatham Dockyard, in an imitation of a "port at Cairo". The scene is brief but involves the main protagonists departing on their mission to the city of the dead.

The Maidstone River Festival, to celebrate the River Medway, running annually since 1980, is held on the last Saturday of July. It features events on and around the river and attracts thousands to Kent's county town. The festival was cancelled in 2012 due to the London Olympics, but returned in 2013. However, the 2013 event did not include a funfair or a fireworks display as in previous years, and lasted just one day instead of two.

Medway Flows Softly is a song by local man George Gilbert; it was written in the mid-1960s and is often played in local folk clubs and at festivals in Kent.

The River Medway is featured at Maidstone in the studio backdrop of the ITV1 regional news programme Meridian Tonight.

At 7.15 p.m. on 1 May each year, local Morris dancers Kettle Bridge Clogs dance across Barming Bridge (otherwise known as the Kettle Bridge) to mark the start of their Morris dancing season.

Recreationally the river is used by many. For example, individuals and many clubs have paddling trips along many different parts of the Medway (e.g. Bewl Canoe Club). Individuals and club members paddling on the Medway and most other rivers should be members of British Canoeing.

=== "Kentish Men" and "Men of Kent" ===
The River Medway has traditionally been associated with the distinction between Men of Kent and Kentish Men, though the precise boundary and historical basis of this division remain disputed. One commonly cited convention places the river as the dividing line, with those born east of the Medway styled Men (or Maids) of Kent and those born to the west Kentish Men (or Maids).

Alternative interpretations of the distinction have also been recorded, and some historians regard the terms as largely synonymous or as reflecting custom rather than any clearly documented historical demarcation. The "Association of Men of Kent and Kentish Men" maintains one modern interpretation of the distinction, though this does not constitute definitive historical evidence for a fixed geographical boundary. The labelling is also sometimes applied to those born in parts of the traditional county later absorbed into London.

== Watermills ==
The power of the Medway has been harnessed for a millennium or more. Waterwheels and turbines powered by the waters of the Medway and its tributaries have been used to mill corn, make paper, make cloth, smelt iron, pump water and generate electricity. There are over 200 sites on the Medway where such usage is known. Today, only one mill is working for a commercial trade.

See Medway watermills, and Medway watermills on the upper tributaries, the middle tributaries and the lower tributaries for more details.

== Gallery ==
Medway scenes:

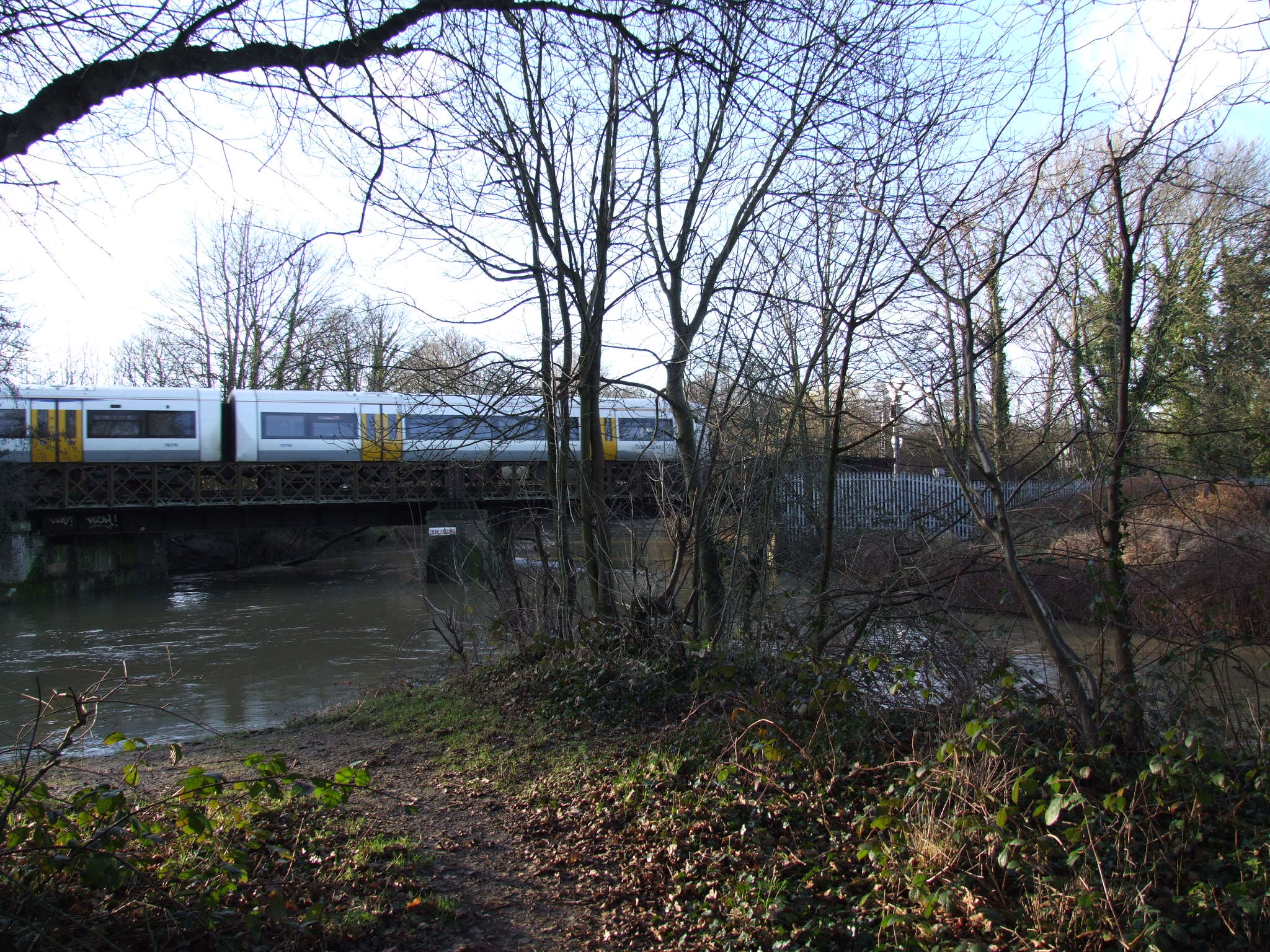
The Medway flows through Tonbridge in many channels. The South Eastern Main Line crosses the Medway.

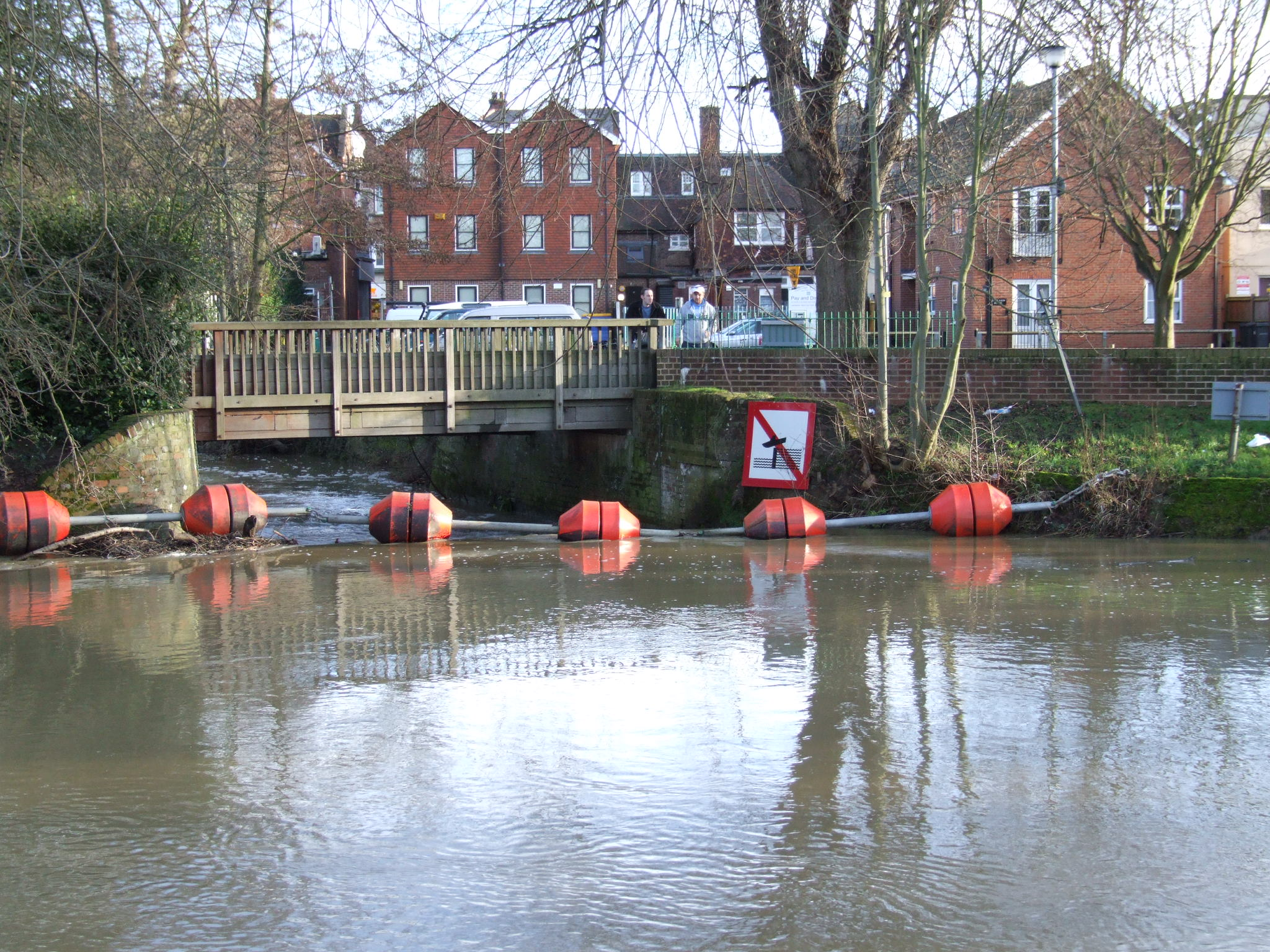
The Botany stream forms another channel in Tonbridge.

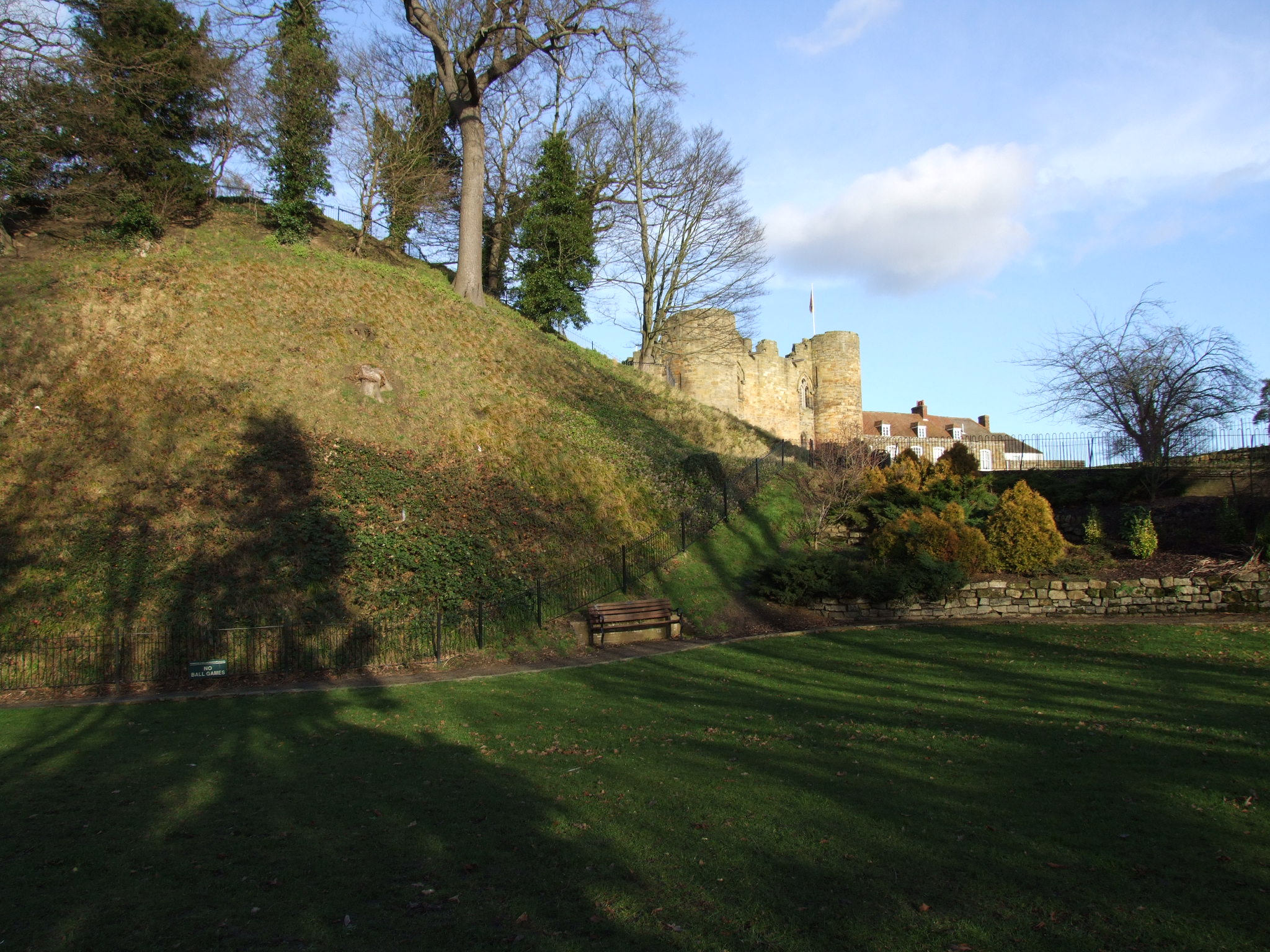
Tonbridge Castle, a motte-and-bailey castle from 1066.

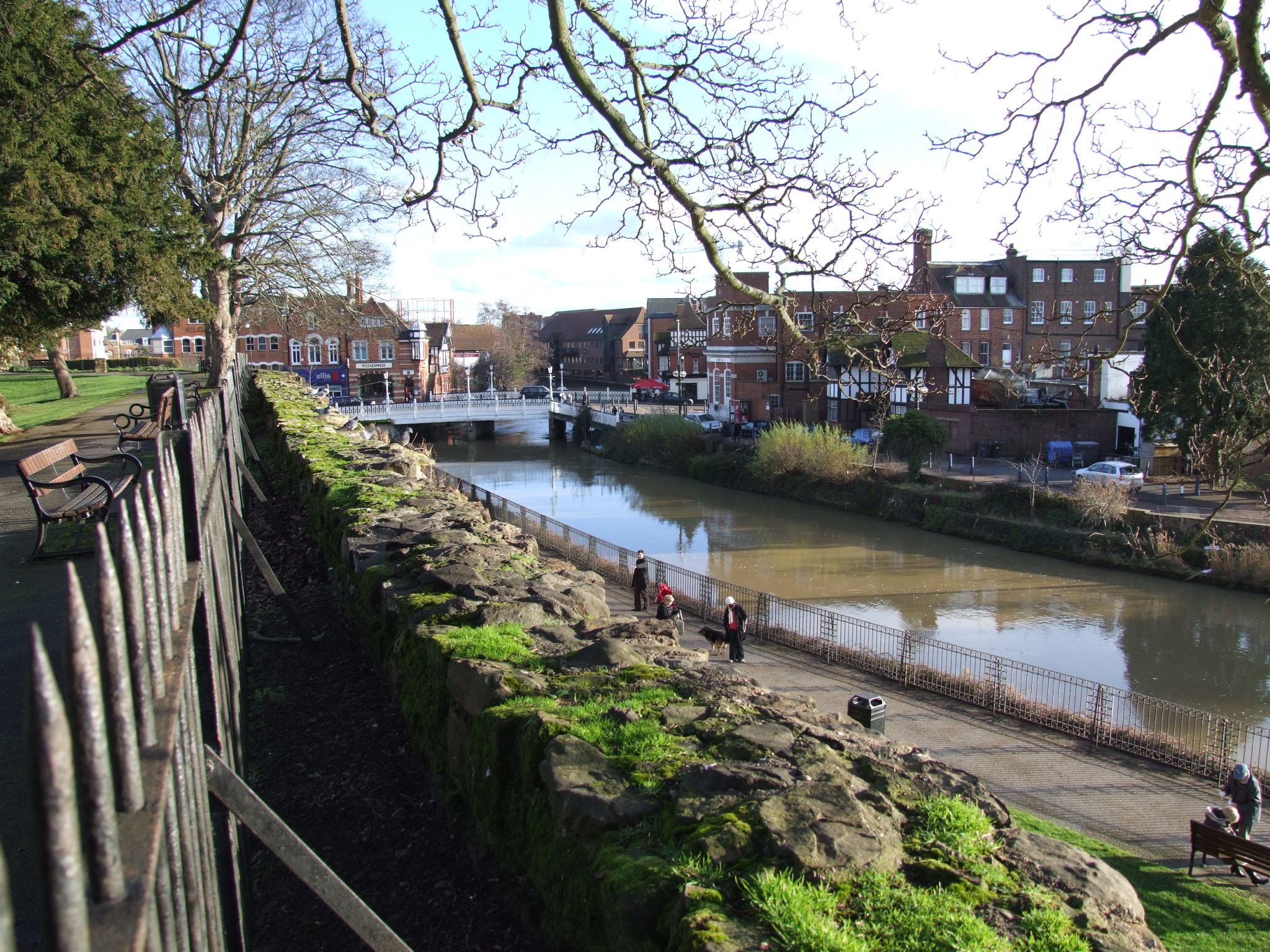
The River Medway passes Tonbridge Castle and passes under Big Bridge.

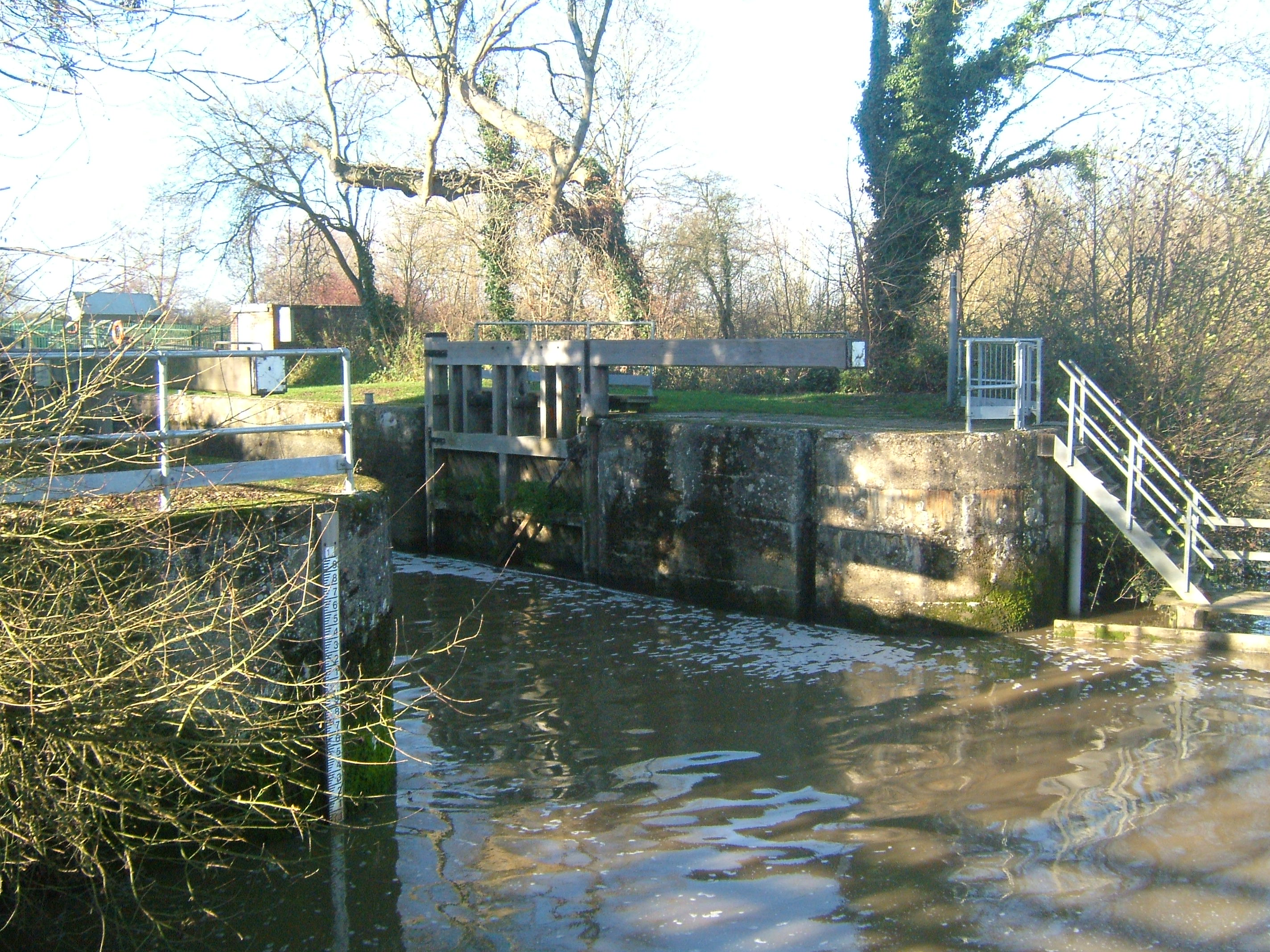
Oak Weir Lock

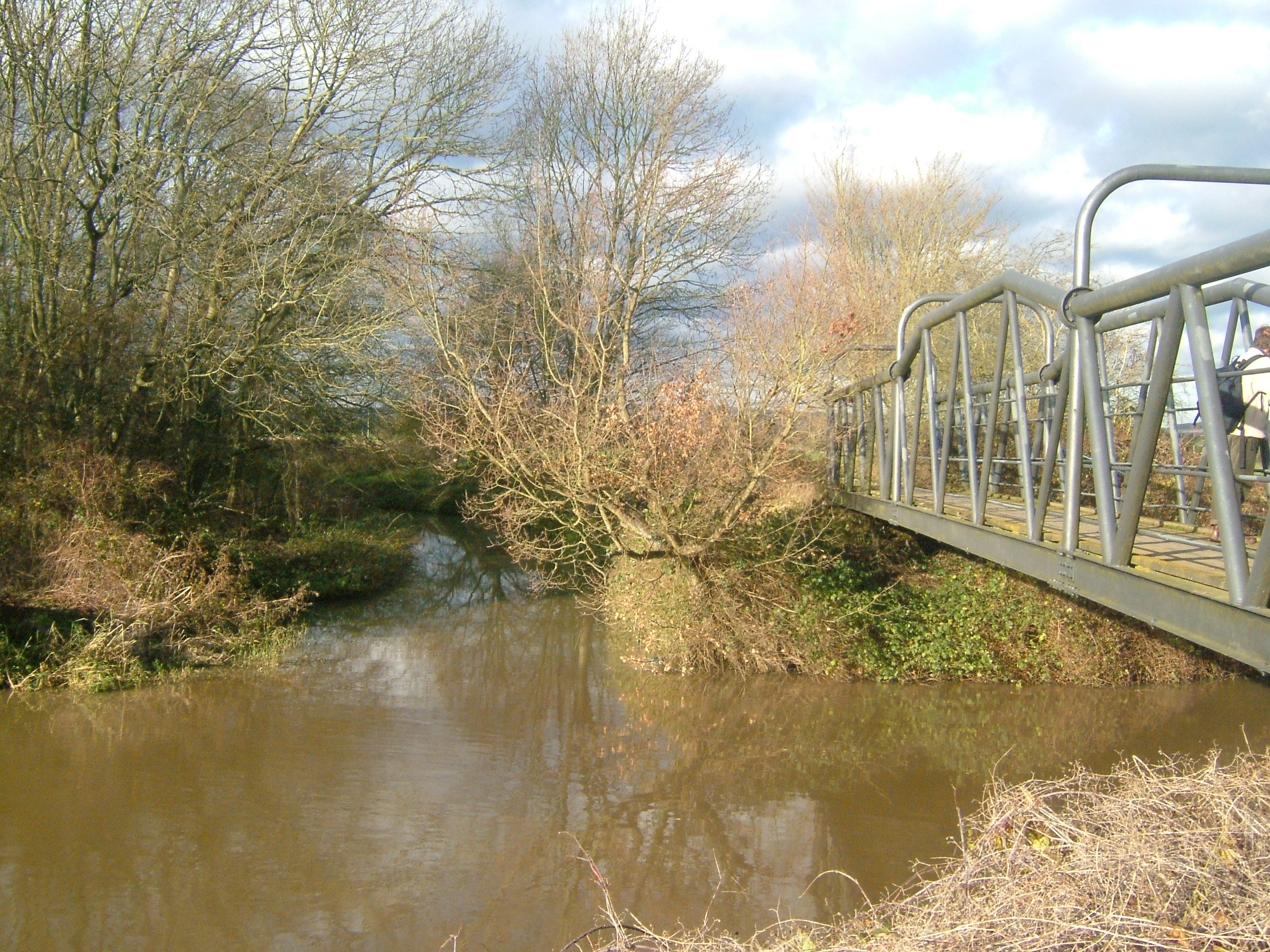
River Bourne enters the Medway

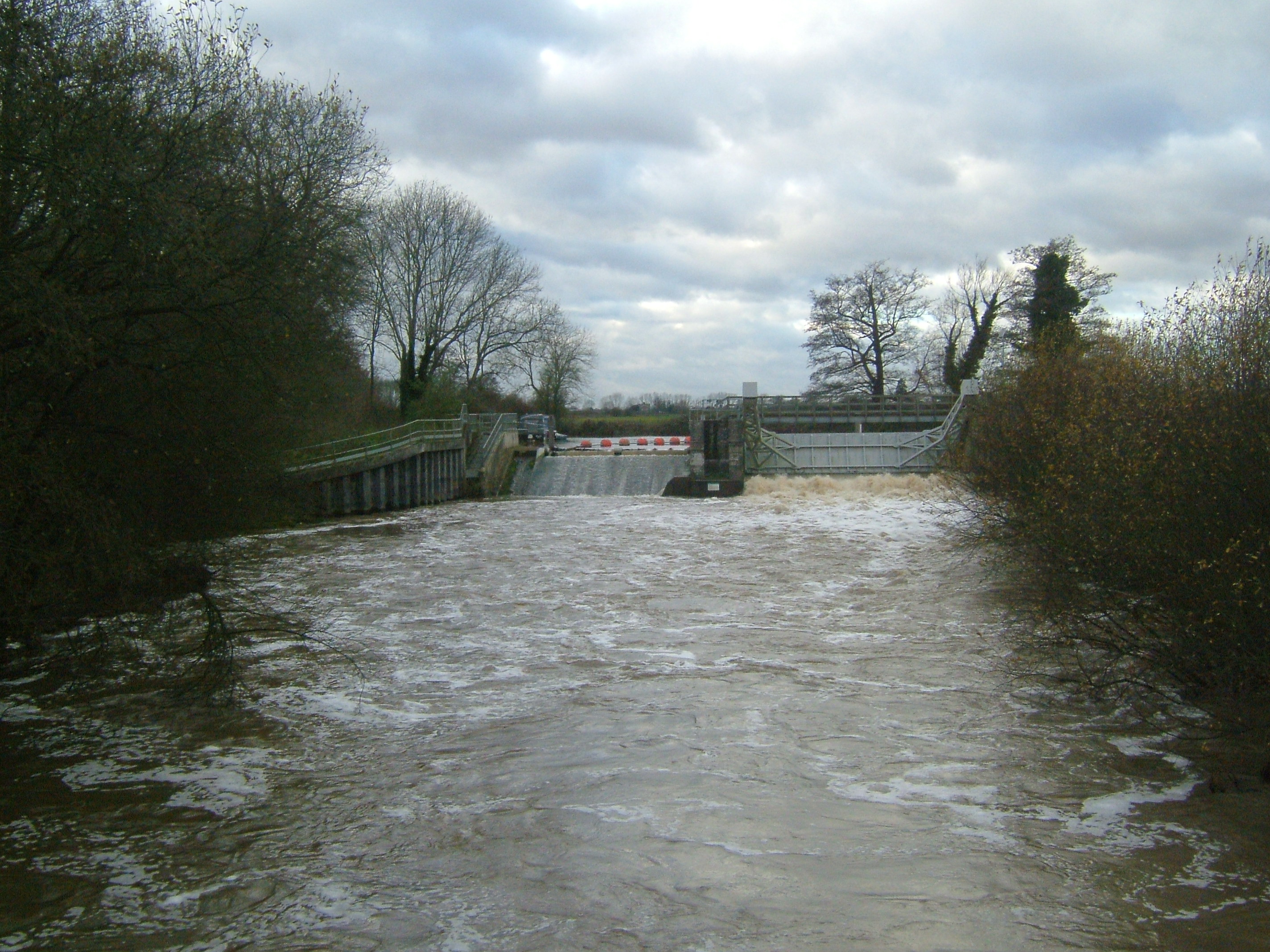
Sluice Weir, on the right is the lock

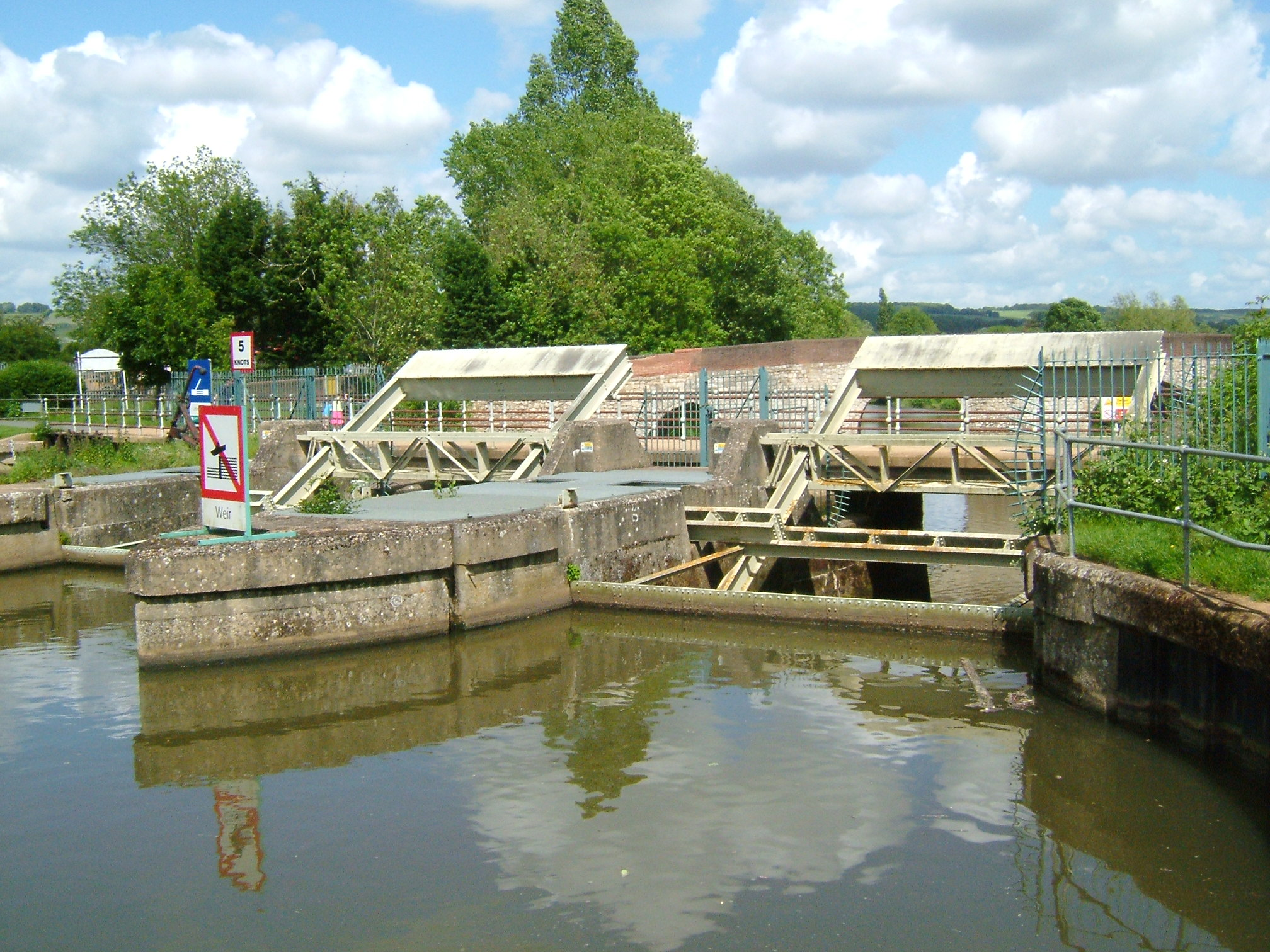
The sluice at Yalding

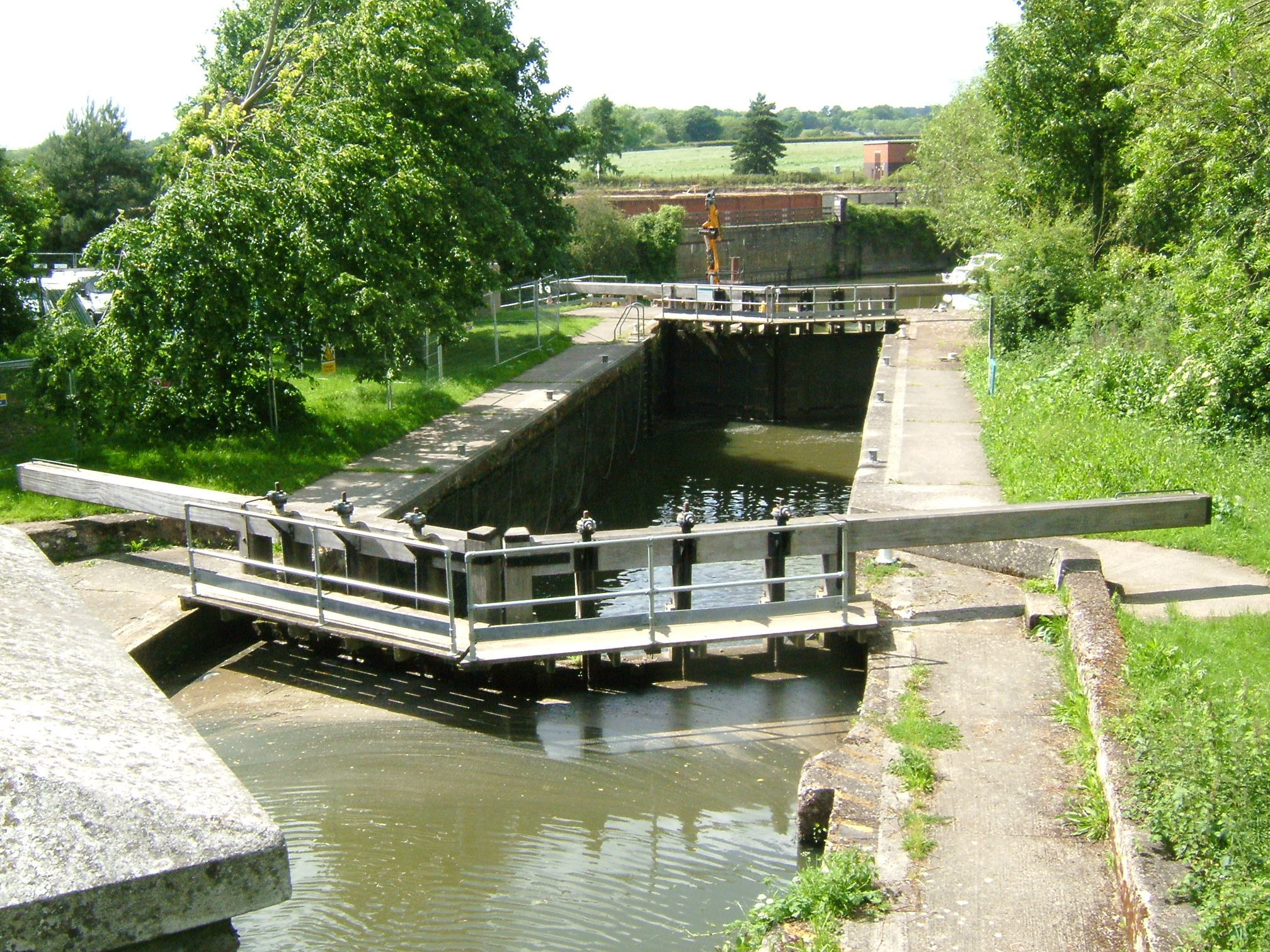
Hampstead Lane Lock, Yalding

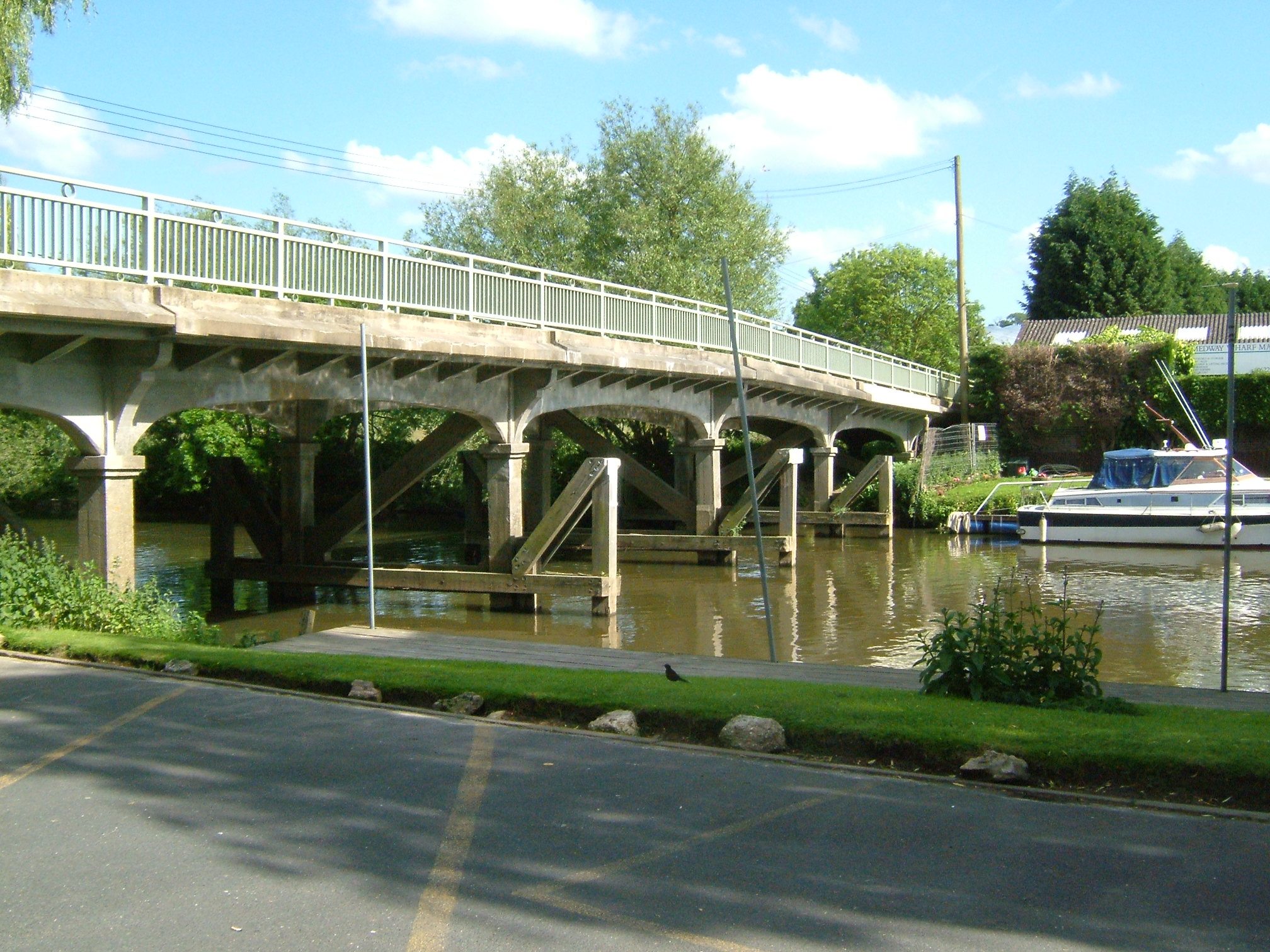
Bow Bridge, Wateringbury

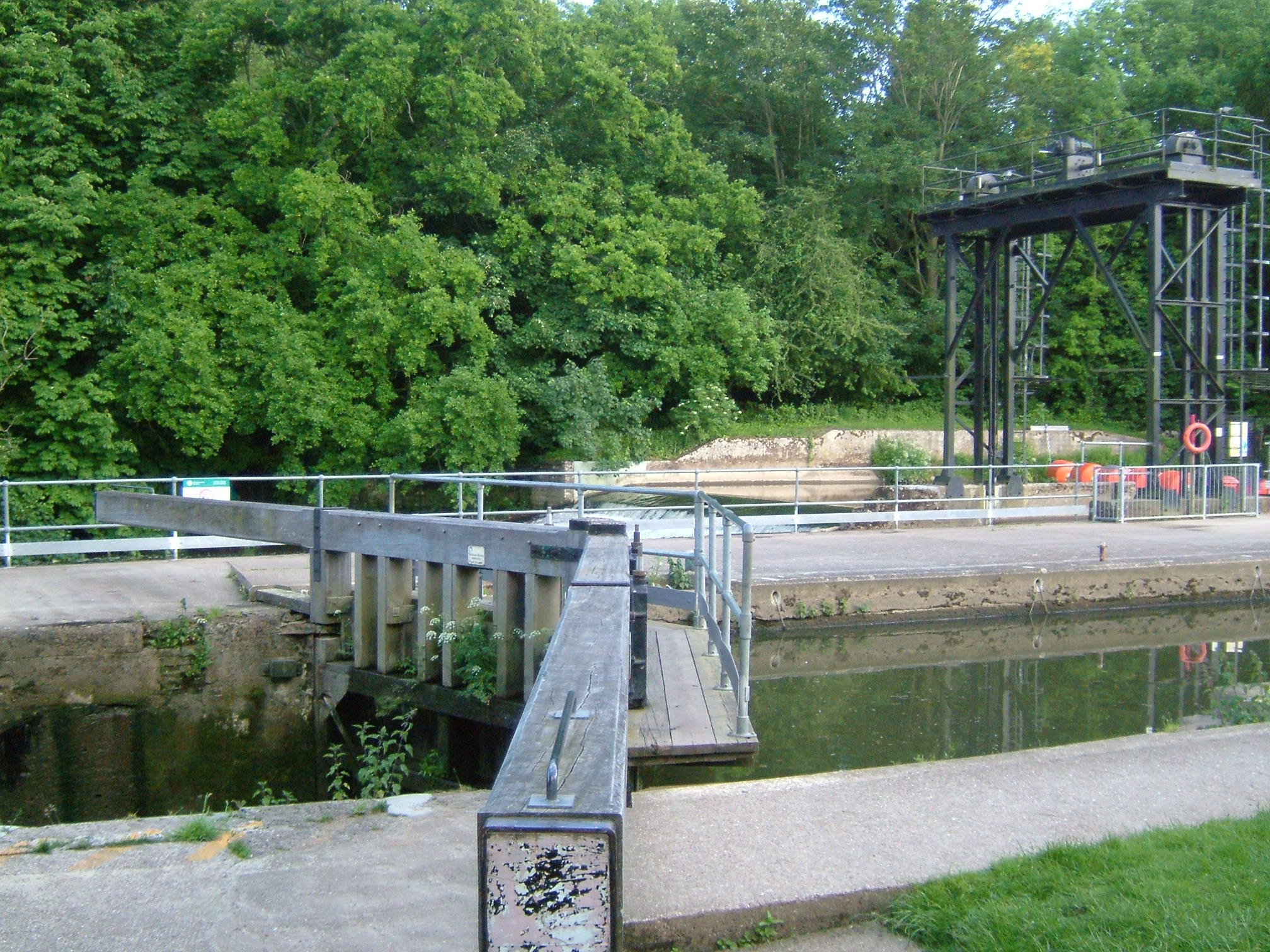
Teston Lock

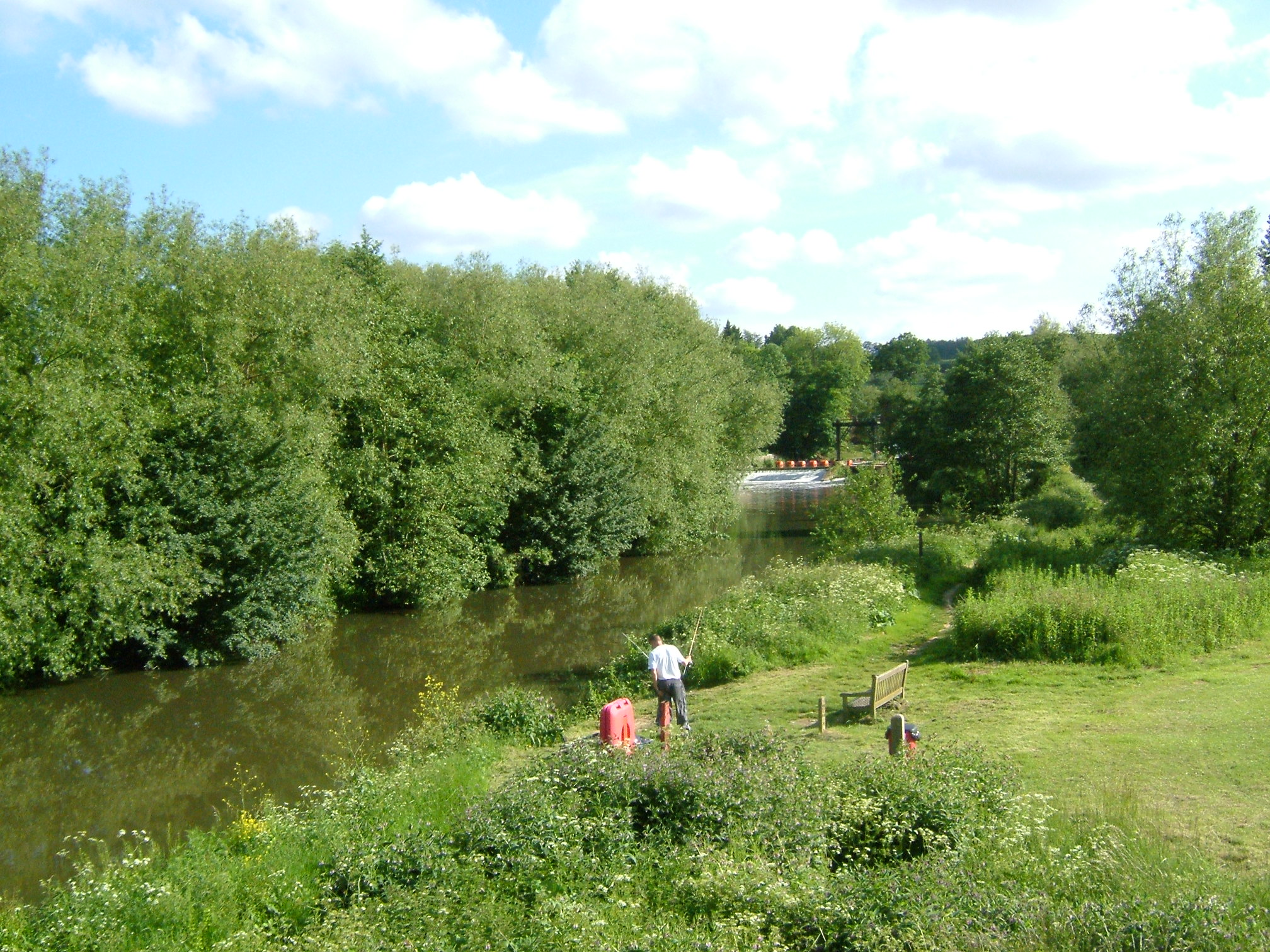
Upstream from Teston Bridge

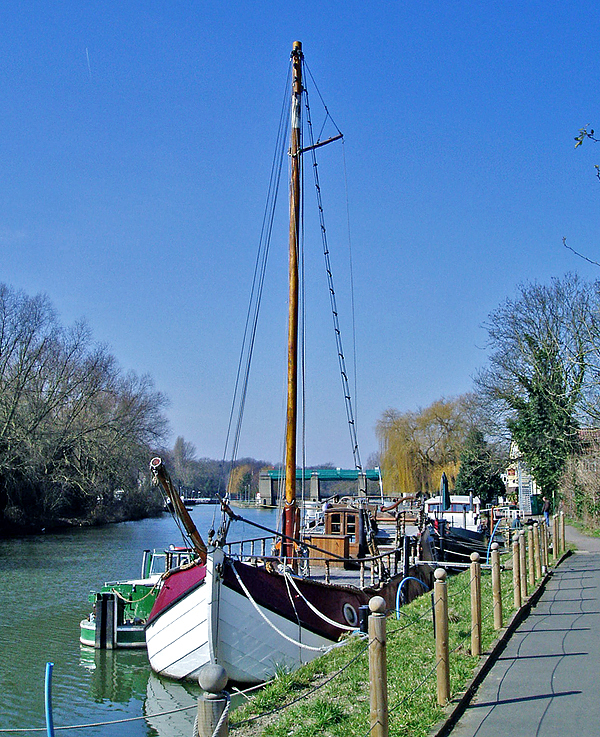
Barges moored on the Medway at Aylesford

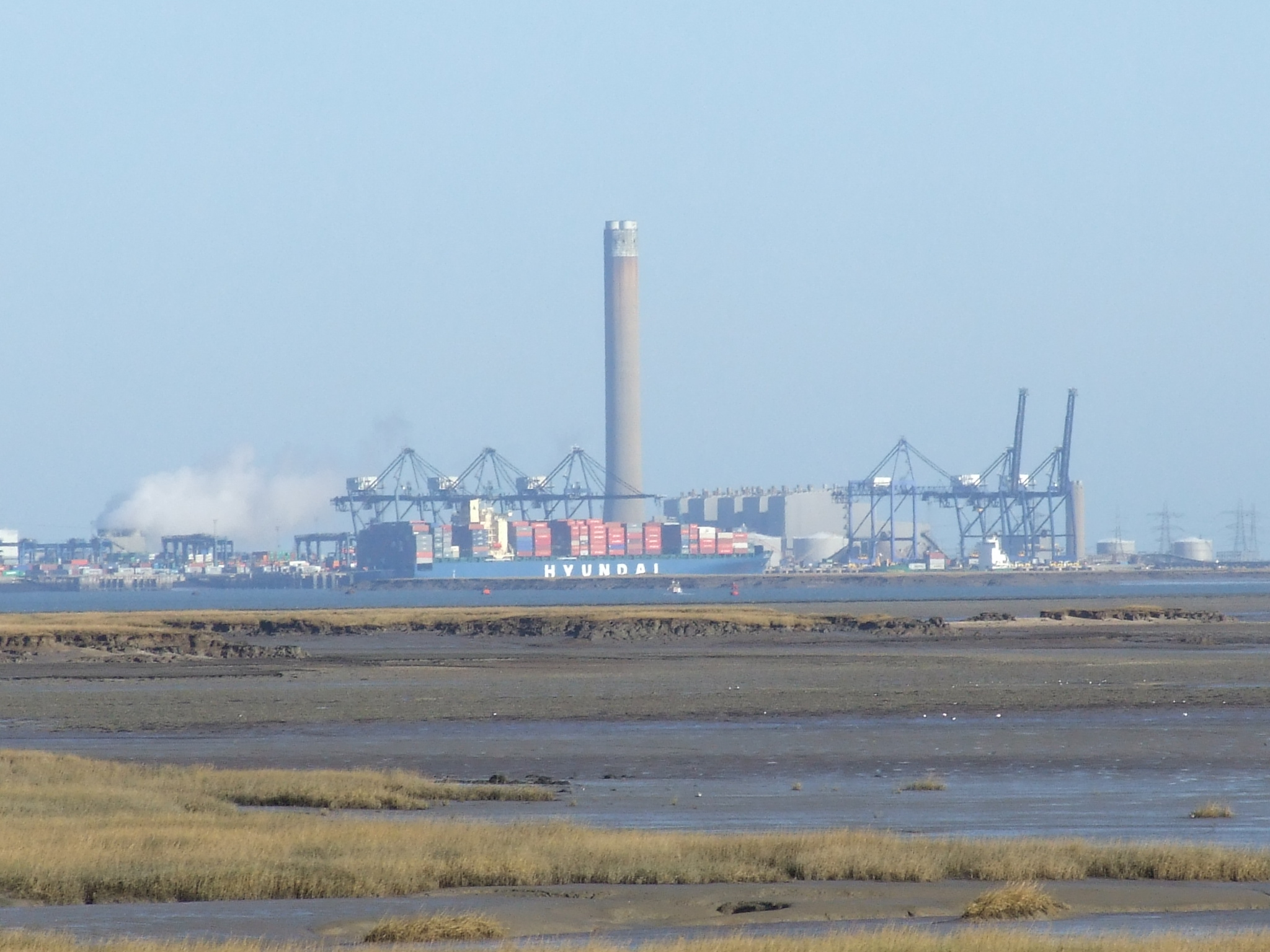
Grain and Thamesport, from Horrid Hill, Gillingham.

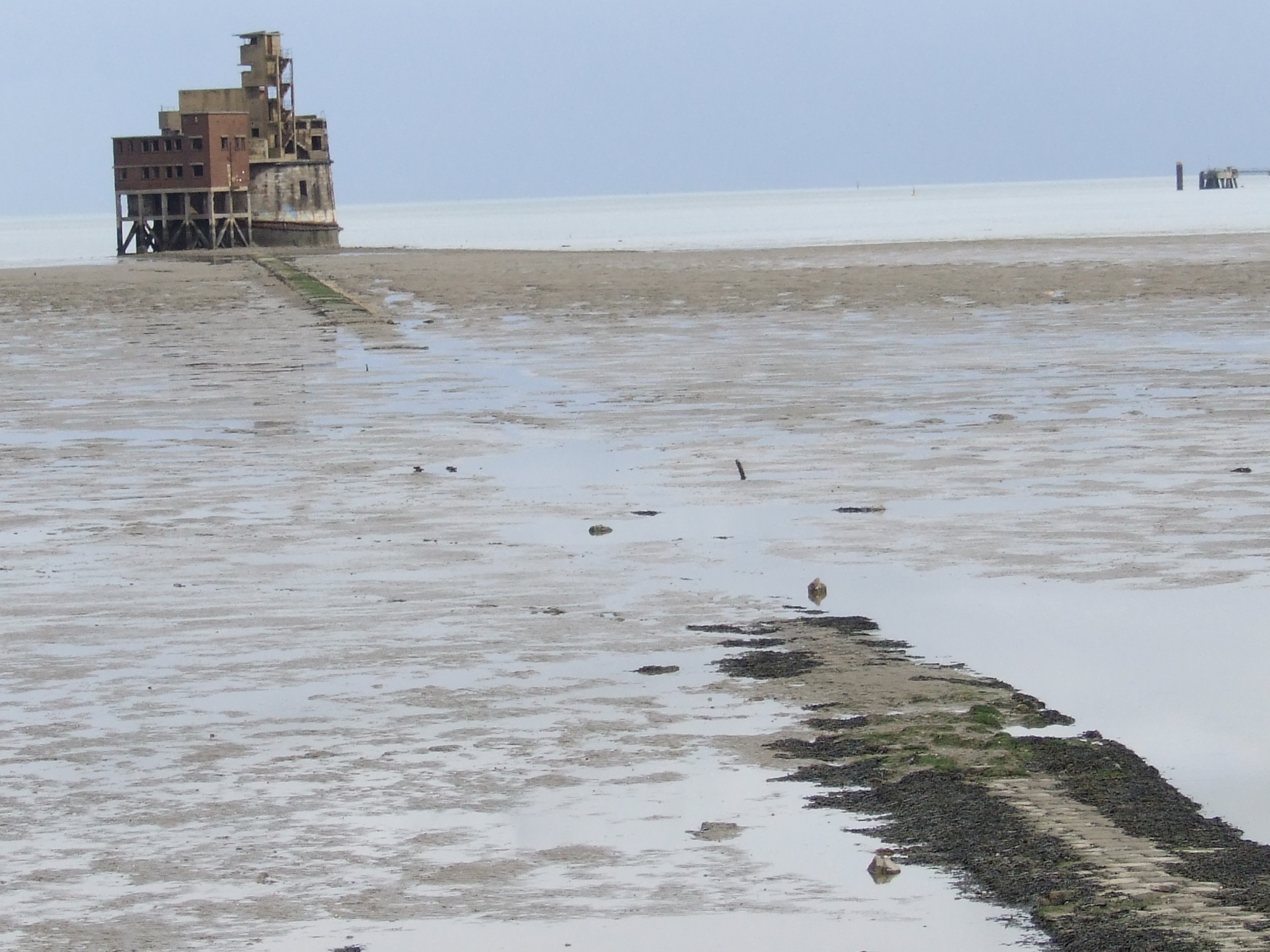
The Grain Tower at low tide.

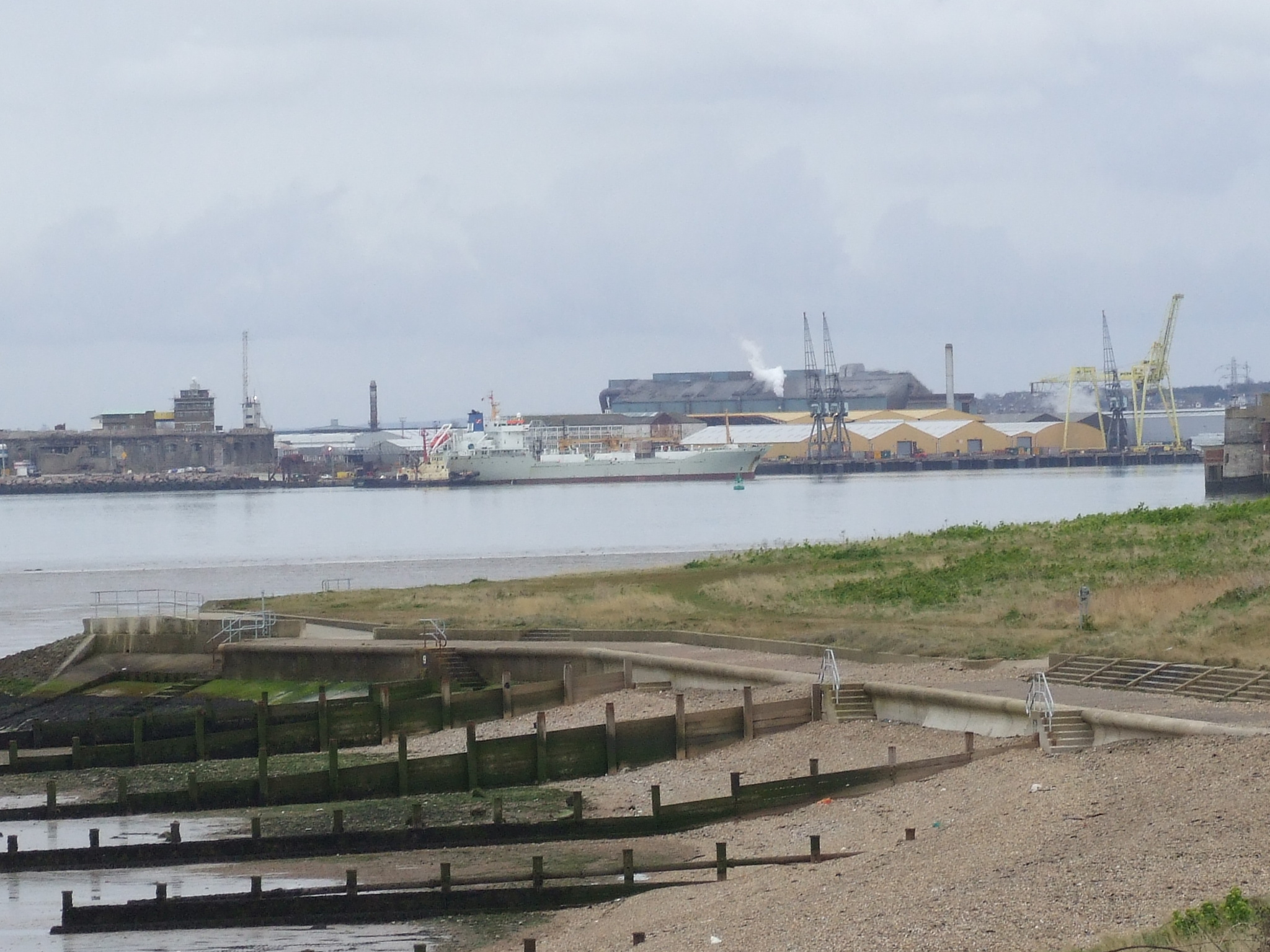
The mouth of the Medway, looking from Grain to Sheerness.

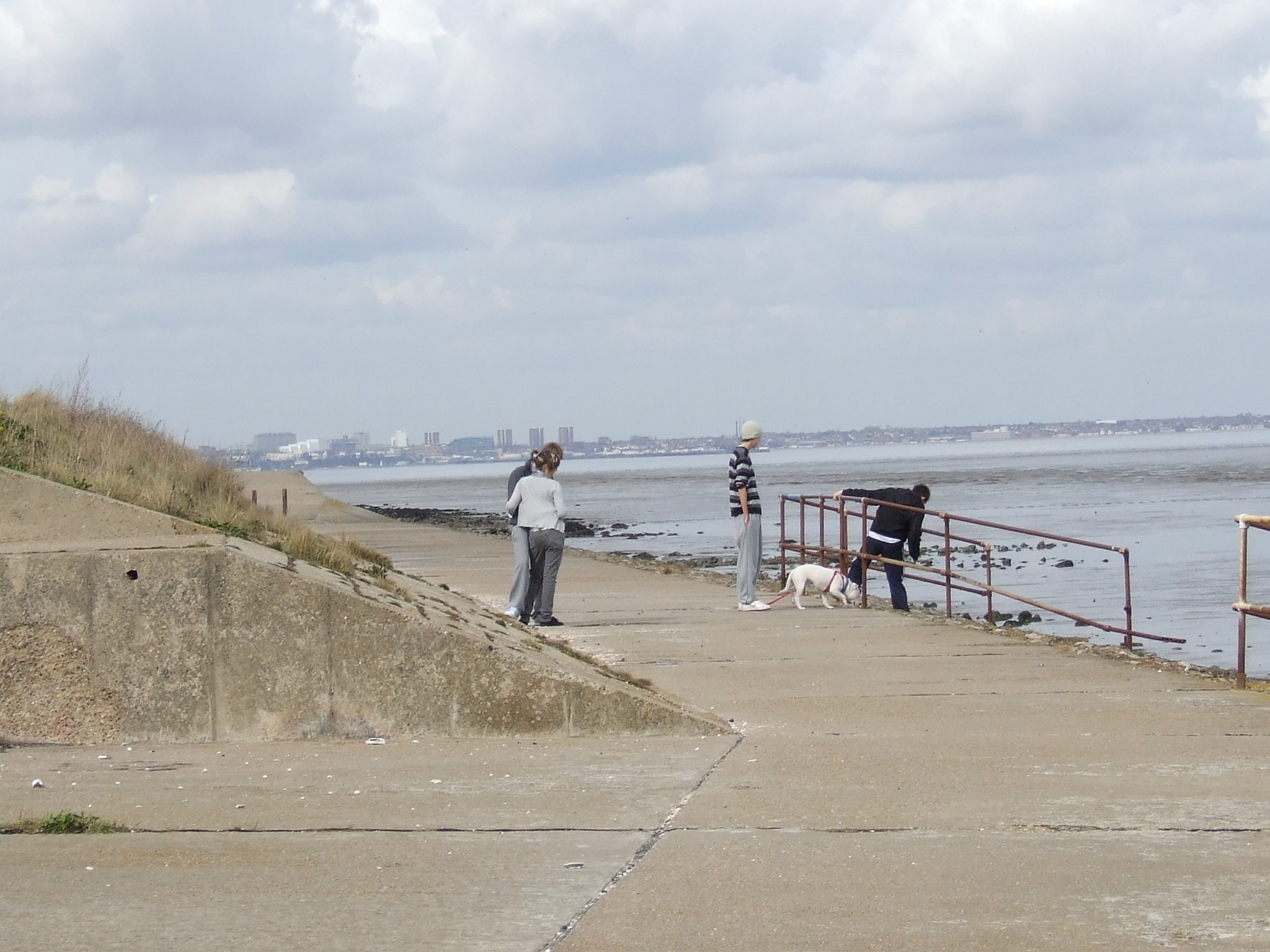
And into the Thames, youngsters at Grain with Southend beyond.

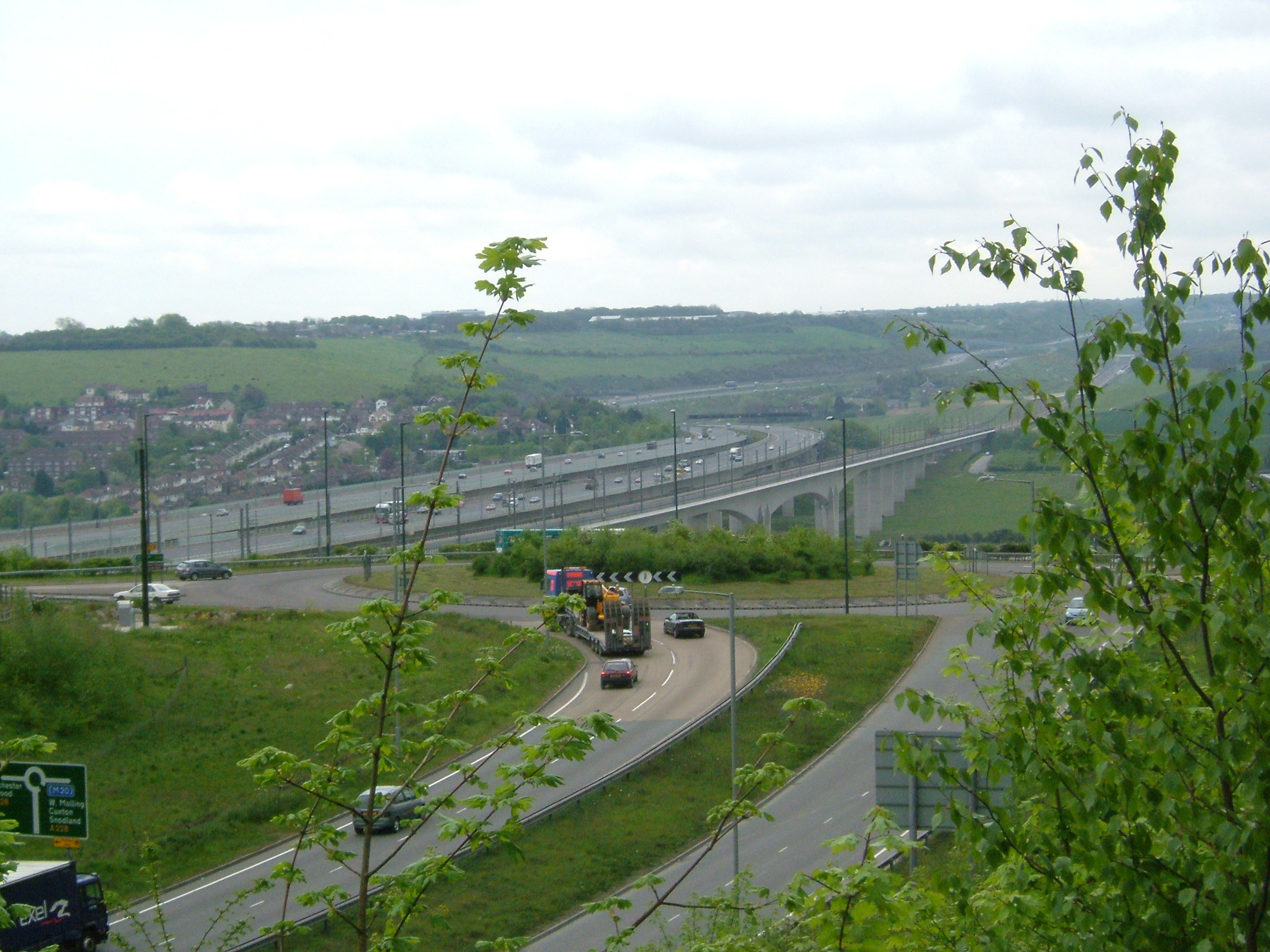
M2 crossing the Medway.

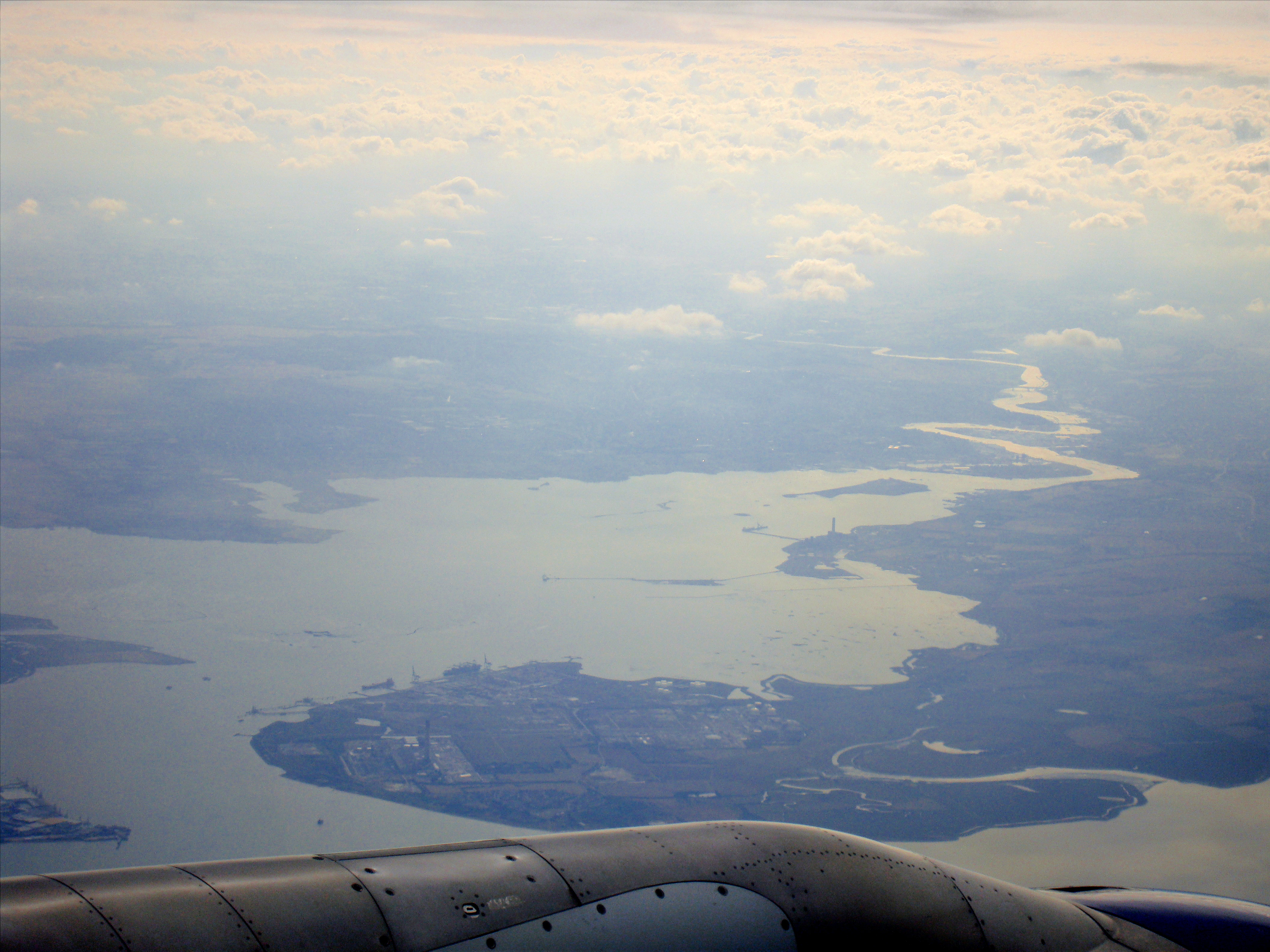
Isle of Grain and the Medway Estuary from the air

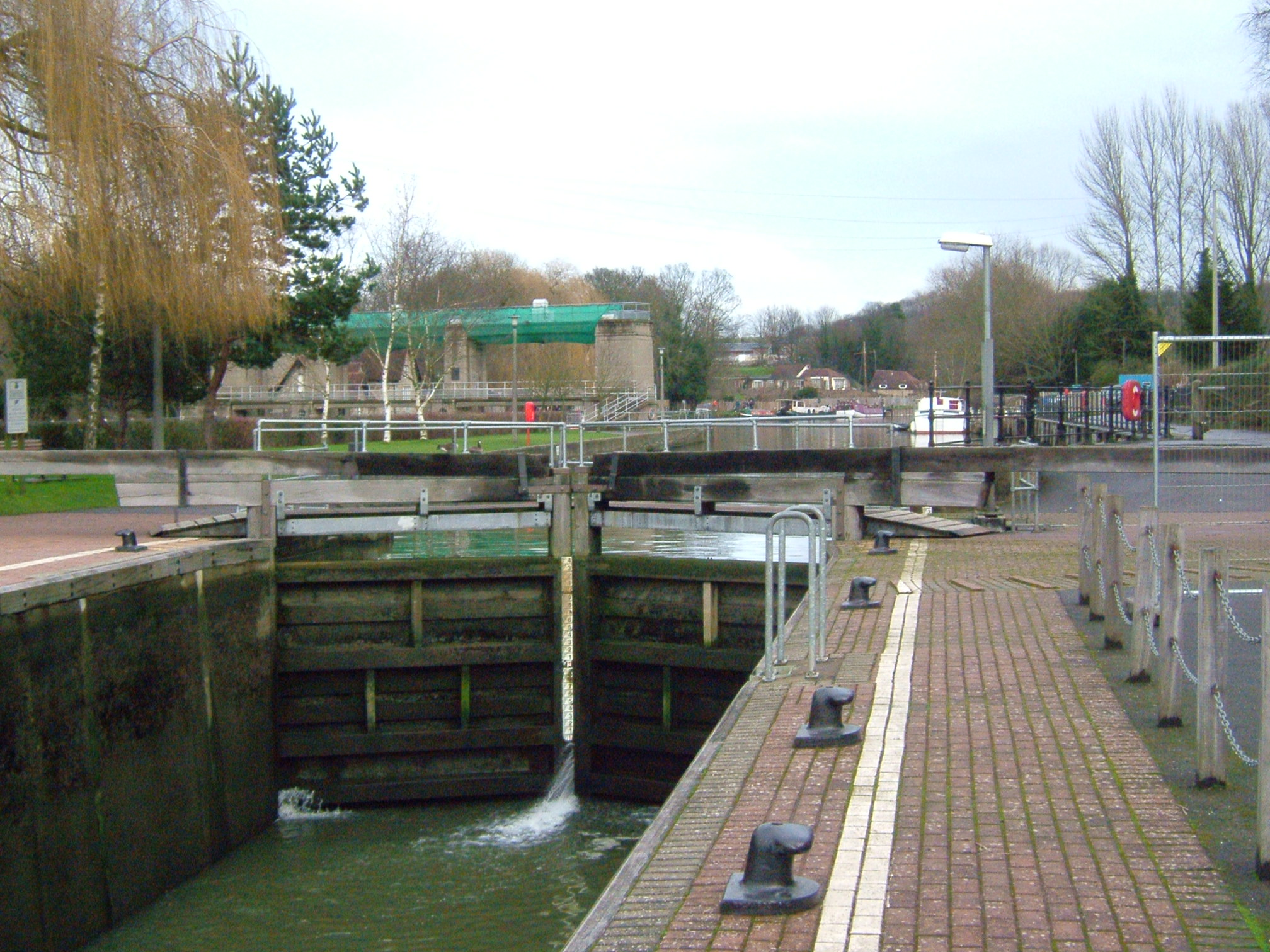
Allington Lock and Sluice gates

== See also ==
- Tributaries of the River Thames
- List of rivers in England
- Rivers of Kent
- London Stones at Upnor
- Medway Navigation

Next confluence upstream	River Thames	Next confluence downstream
Bill Meroy Creek (north)	River Medway	–
