= Collier Street =

Village in Kent, England

Coordinates: 51.189460°N 0.454580°E

- Location within Kent
- Population: 796 (2011 Census)
- OS grid reference: TQ714467
- District: Maidstone
- Shire county: Kent
- Region: South East
- Country: England
- Sovereign state: United Kingdom
- Post town: Tonbridge
- Postcode district: TN12
- Dialling code: 01892
- Police: Kent
- Fire: Kent
- Ambulance: South East Coast
- UK Parliament: Weald of Kent
- Website: Collier Street Parish Council

Collier Street is a small village and civil parish in the Borough of Maidstone in Kent, England. The village is in a rural location but is close to the larger villages of Yalding, Marden and Horsmonden.

The village includes St Margaret's Church, a primary school, a small business estate and several farms. St. Margaret's church and school are at the centre of the village. The church forms part of a benefice with St. Mary's in Laddingford and St. Peter & St. Paul in Yalding. The three villages are located within three miles of each other but Collier Street, once part of Yalding's civil parish, has had its own parish since 1999. The civic or civil parish of Collier Street is governed by an elected parish council and was formed following a review by Maidstone Borough Council.

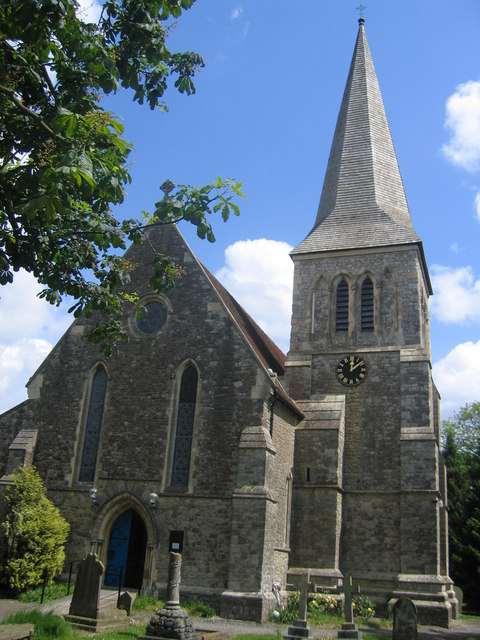
St Margaret's Church, Collier Street

== History ==
The village seems not to have existed before the start of the nineteenth century, nor does the road even appear on maps before the late C18th. It is most likely that the village was named for a long narrow clearing ('strait' hence 'street') through a wood used by charcoal burners (hence 'Collier'). Subsequently farms were established along with a handful of country houses before the majority of housing followed in the early Victorian era. The church was built between 1847 and 1849 and the attached school was opened in 1860.

Collier Street as a village incorporated a handful of smaller places named for the older farms or substantial houses which existed before the majority of the village's housing was built in Victorian times: for example Saxonden, Spitzbrook and Mockbeggar. A couple of old wealden roads make up the village proper; the main road which has no specific name is the B2162, part of a longer old road running from SE London / NW Kent down to Rye on the south coast.

Historically, the village was situated in the middle of a hop-growing region. Its population swelled during the harvest as whole families, often from South-East London, arrived to help bring in the hops. However, as foreign hops became cheaper and easier to source nearly all the farms moved to other arable production by the second half of the C20th. Today the fields are home to pears, strawberries and raspberries but the area is known more for its apple orchards – Collier Street has been colloquially known as 'The village in an orchard'. Some of the old hoppers' huts can still be found amongst the local orchards, fields and gardens.

== Amenities ==
The Church of England primary school (St. Margaret's CEP) has been enlarged several times, now to accommodate more than 100 pupils. The closest comprehensive secondary school is Mascalls Academy and there are several private schools in the area. Ex-pupils of St. Margaret's typically attend Mascalls or one of the various grammar schools in the nearest towns.

The village has a population of less than 500 and has no shop, post office or pub. There were once at least two pubs in the village itself but these are now private residences: The Duke of Wellington (now Wellington House) and the Prince of Wales (now Kerry House). Two more in the parish have also closed: The Engineers (between Collier Street and Laddingford) closed in 1970 and the White Hart (Claygate) closed in 2016. There are still two pubs within a couple of miles of the village however; The Woolpack in Benover to the north and The Chequers in Laddingford to the Northwest. There was once a shop / post office at the far end of Haviker Street but this was not re-instated after a fire in 1994. There was also a shop and police station opposite Bartons Farm in the 1960s and 1970s.

== Sport ==
Collier Street was once home to The Boarded Circuit, a Grasstrack and Longtrack motorcycle racing circuit, which held two or three events each season. The circuit was unique in being the only fully boarded permanent Grasstrack venue in the UK, but this has now closed.

== See also ==
- Listed buildings in Collier Street
