= Yalding =

Village in Kent, England

Coordinates: 51.224°N 0.429°E

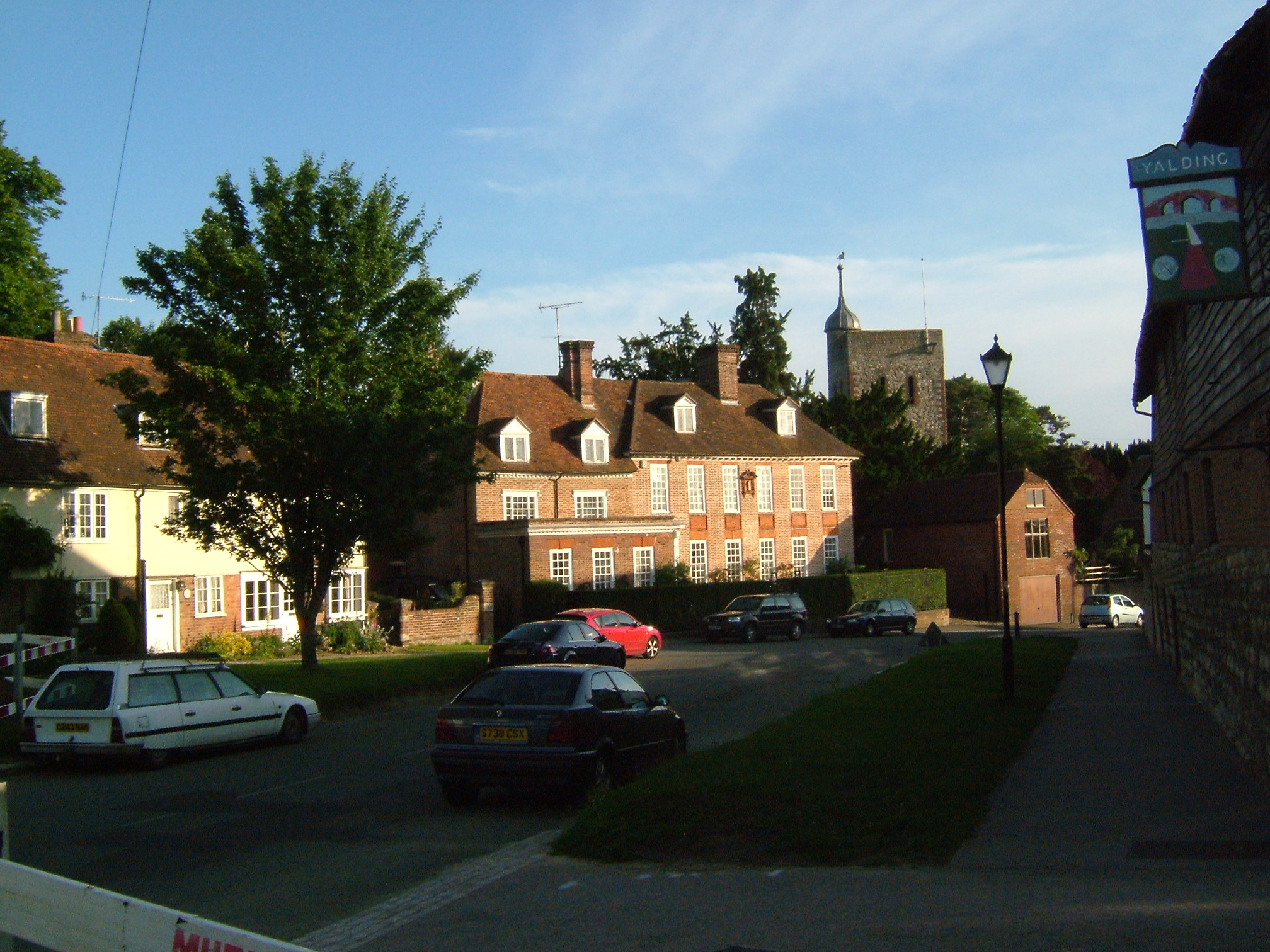
- Georgian buildings on the High Street

- Location within Kent
- Population: 2,236 (2001); 2,418 (2011 Census)
- OS grid reference: TQ6949
- Civil parish: Yalding
- District: Maidstone
- Shire county: Kent
- Region: South East
- Country: England
- Sovereign state: United Kingdom
- Post town: Maidstone
- Postcode district: ME18
- Dialling code: 01622
- Police: Kent
- Fire: Kent
- Ambulance: South East Coast
- UK Parliament: Weald of Kent

Yalding is a village and civil parish in the Borough of Maidstone in Kent, England. The village is situated 6 miles (9.7 km) south west of Maidstone at a point where the Rivers Teise and Beult join the River Medway. At the 2001 census, the parish, which includes the villages of Benover to the southeast, Laddingford to the southwest and Queen Street, had a population of 2,236. increasing to 2,418 at the 2011 Census.

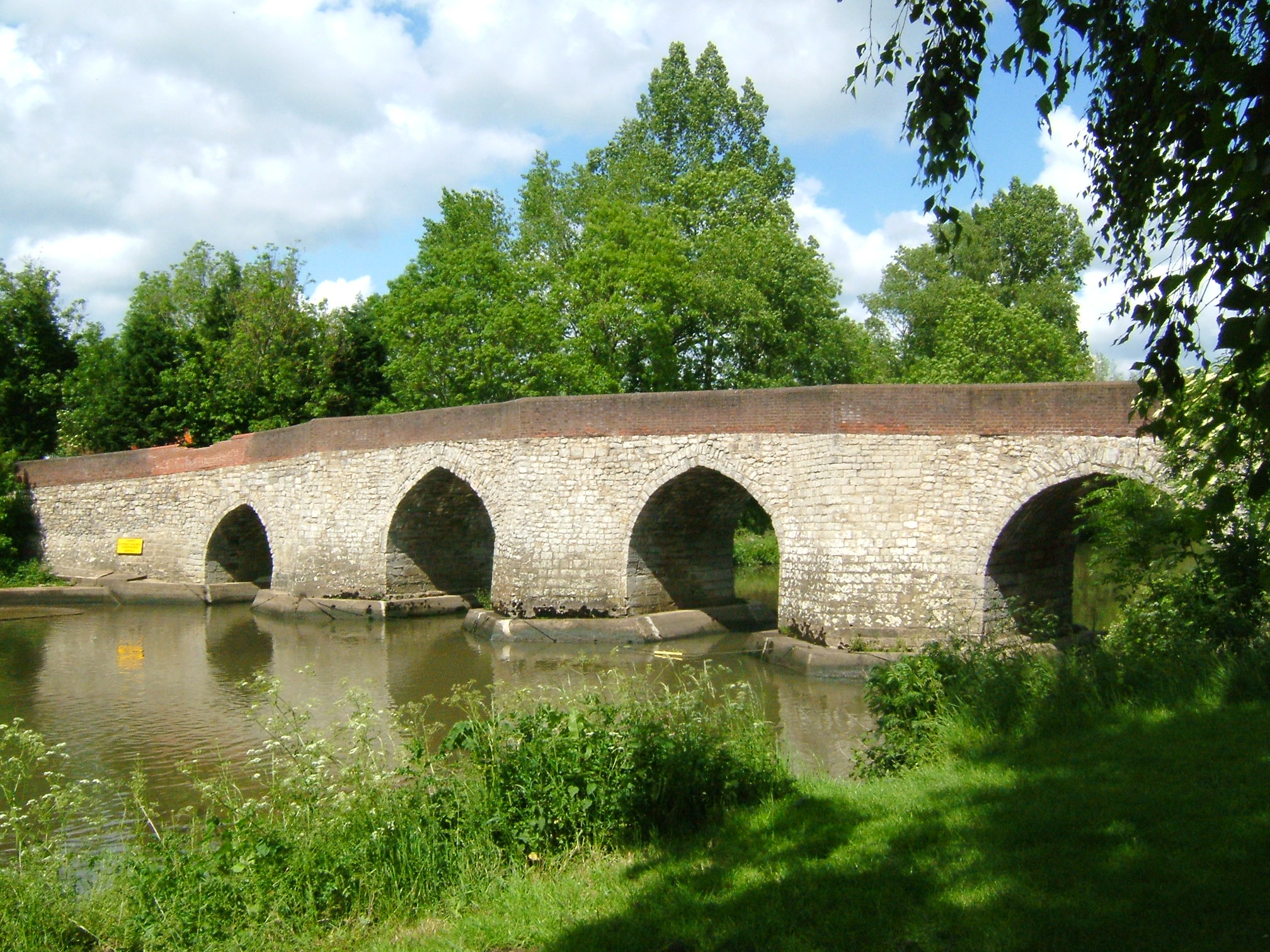
The Twyford Bridge.

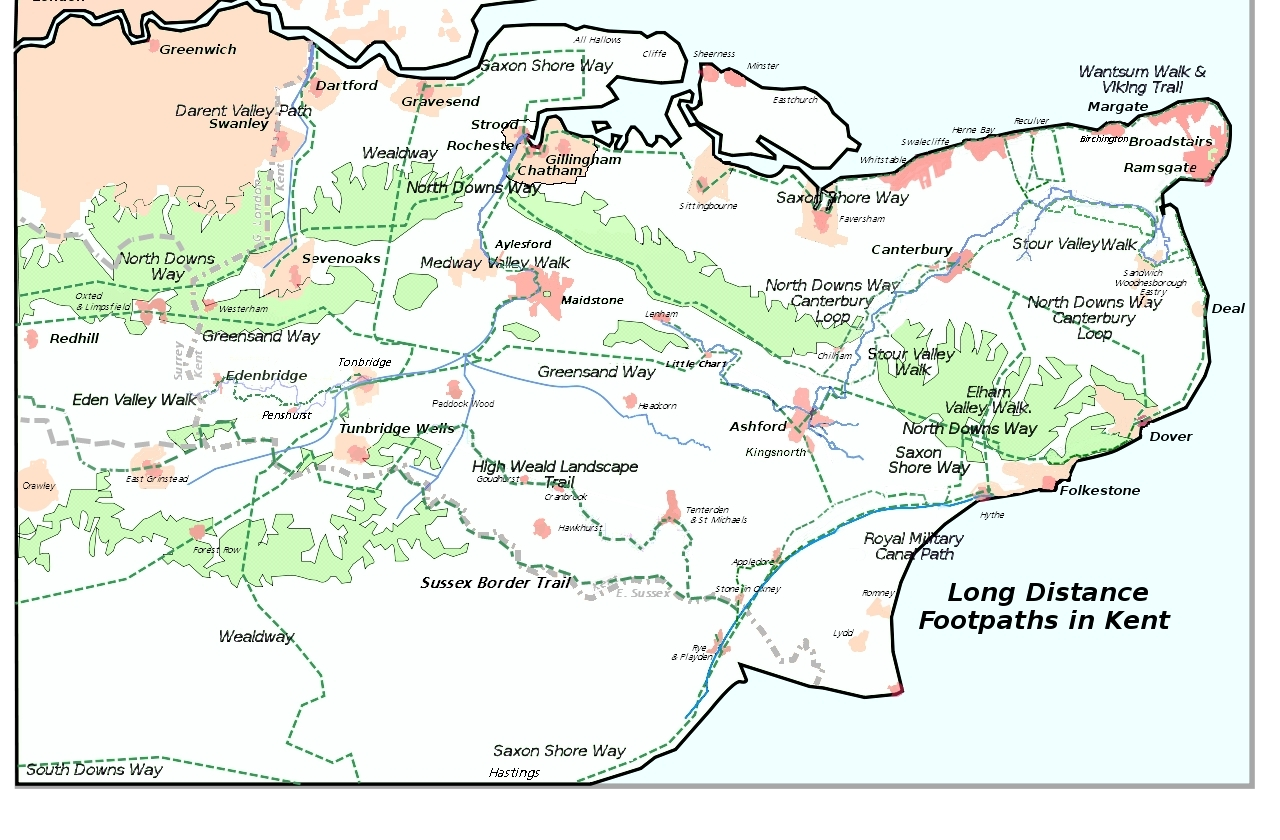
Yalding lies where the Greensand Way and Medway Valley Walk cross, 6 miles (9.7 km) of Maidstone, at the confluence of the rivers Medway, Teise and Beult.

There are three bridges in the village; the Twyford Bridge (meaning twin ford, where there was originally a double crossing of the two rivers) is one of the longest medieval bridges in the south-east of England.

Yalding was one of the principal shipment points on the River Medway for cannon, from villages of the Wealden iron industry. The wharf was later used for transporting fruit from the many orchards in the area.

== History ==
=== Name and origins ===
The name Yalding is generally derived from the Old English group name *Ealdingas, meaning "(settlement of) the people of a man called Ealda", formed from the personal name Ealda and the suffix -ingas. Recorded forms include Alding in 1161–2, Ealding' in 1207 and Yaldyng in 1451. Writing in 1798, Edward Hasted noted that the parish was "antiently written Ealding", which he took to mean "the antient meadow or low ground", an interpretation not followed by later place-name scholars. The National Archives' catalogue of Great Domesday Book records the Domesday place name for Yalding as Hallinges, on folio 14r, while Hasted's translation of the entry renders it Ealdinges. By 1642 the name was written Yaldinge.

A local tradition holds that the first Saxon settlement, called Twyford ("two fords"), lay at the meeting of the Medway and the Teise and was moved to higher ground after flooding, but this is not supported by documentary evidence. Twyford was the name of the hundred in which most of the parish lay, and of the crossing of the Medway south-west of the village.

=== Domesday Book ===
In 1086 Yalding was held by Richard fitz Gilbert, also known as Richard de Tonbridge, as tenant-in-chief; before the Norman Conquest it had been held by Alred under King Edward. The manor was assessed at two sulungs and had land for 16 ploughs, with 1.5 lord's plough teams and 6 men's teams. Its 43 recorded households comprised 16 villagers, 12 smallholders and 15 slaves, placing it among the largest 20 per cent of settlements in the survey. It had 5 acres of meadow, woodland for 150 pigs, two mills worth £1 5s, four fisheries and two churches, which Hasted identified as Yalding and Brenchley. Hasted's translation gives the fisheries' render as 1,700 eels less twenty. The manor's value had fallen from £30 in 1066 to £20 in 1086, and it was recorded as partly waste.

=== Clare, Audley and Stafford lordship ===
Yalding remained with Richard fitz Gilbert's descendants, the de Clare family, later earls of Gloucester and Hertford. Under Edward I Gilbert de Clare was allowed all the privileges of a manor there. Surviving estate accounts for 1299–1300, 1307–08 and 1317–20 show that Yalding yielded the Clares more than £79 in 1300 and £66 19s 6d by 1320. After Gilbert de Clare was killed at the Battle of Bannockburn in 1314, the Clare inheritance was divided among his three sisters, and Yalding passed to Margaret and her husband Hugh de Audley. In the twelfth year of Edward II Audley obtained a weekly market and a three-day fair for the manor, held on the vigil, day and morrow of the feast of St Peter and St Paul. A fair was held on the Lees beside Twyford Bridge from 1339. On Audley's death in 1347 the manor passed through his daughter Margaret to her husband Ralph Stafford, created Earl of Stafford in 1350, and it descended in the Stafford family to the dukes of Buckingham.

Within the parish lay several lesser manors, including Woodfolde, Lodingford (alias Bermondsey), Jennings Court and Henhurst, held of the Clare earls by knight service. The manor of Bockingfold, on the southern edge of the parish, had a free chapel and an extensive park. Edward II stayed there in the nineteenth year of his reign, before leaving for France, and ordered the indictment of those who had hunted unlawfully in the park.

=== Church ===
Richard de Clare, Earl of Hertford gave the church of Yalding, with the chapel of Brenchley, to Tonbridge Priory, which he had founded. Gilbert Glanvill, Bishop of Rochester, confirmed the appropriation and ordained a vicarage; Laurence, presented in 1184, was the first vicar. The present Church of St Peter and St Paul was begun in the 13th century and is a Grade I listed building. When the priory was suppressed in 1525 for Cardinal Wolsey's college at Oxford, the church passed to that foundation, and to the Crown after Wolsey's fall in 1529. In the tenth year of Elizabeth I the rectory and advowson were leased to John Warde at £30 a year, and in the reign of James I they passed to his son Ambrose Warde.

=== Bridges and rivers ===
Yalding stands at the confluence of the Medway, the Beult and the Teise, and the low ground near the rivers was prone to flooding. Twyford Bridge, which carries the road over the Medway south-west of the village, was first scheduled as a monument on 5 December 1928. It has four pointed arches, is about 4 metres wide and spans about 55 metres across the Medway. A bridge is recorded there in 1325 and in wills of 1475 and 1488. In 1600 the bridge was presented at the Maidstone sessions as being in bad repair, its upkeep falling on the inhabitants of Twyford hundred. Town Bridge, the ragstone bridge over the Beult in the village, dates from at least the 15th century and probably replaced a timber bridge. Money was left for its upkeep in wills of 1474 and 1475, and Historic England considers it the longest medieval bridge in Kent. Excavation in 1969 found that its foundations rested on brushwood, and the finds included a silver penny of Edward I. The antiquary John Leland, writing under Henry VIII, called Yalding "a praty townelet".

=== Late medieval and Tudor period ===
After the 2nd Duke of Buckingham was executed in 1483, Richard III granted the manor to Ralph Banister, who had betrayed him. It was restored to the Staffords under Henry VII. When Edward Stafford, 3rd Duke of Buckingham, was executed for treason in 1521, Yalding was forfeited to the Crown. Henry VIII granted it the same year to Charles Somerset, 1st Earl of Worcester, who sold it to George Nevill, Lord Bergavenny. It remained with the Nevill family until a later Lord Bergavenny sold it; it then passed to the Freers of Westmeston in Sussex, who sold it around 1670. The Court Lodge and the demesne lands had by then been separated from the manor. According to local research cited in the Yalding Project, an epidemic in 1510 killed more than half of the village's inhabitants, possibly from plague or sweating sickness.

The Kenward family held estates in the parish from the reign of Henry VIII. Elizabethan court records name Yalding inhabitants including a broadweaver, a tailor, husbandmen and yeomen, and in 1600 two men were committed for keeping victualling houses without a licence. Hop cultivation spread through Kent from the early 16th century, and Hasted later described the northern part of the parish as "kindly both for corn and hops". Yalding was also a shipping point on the Medway for cannon from the Wealden iron industry, including guns cast by John Browne of Horsmonden. Charitable gifts to the parish's poor included land left by Julian Kenward in 1619, a deed by Thomas Cleave and Bennet Warde in 1637 providing thirteen penny loaves every Sunday, £50 in land from Ambrose Warde (died 1637), and a gift of 1641 by Julian Kenward and Thomas and John Twiffin to pay a schoolmaster to teach five poor children.

=== Civil War, 1643 ===
In July 1643 about 4,000 royalists, mainly from around Tonbridge, Sevenoaks and Faversham, gathered at Sevenoaks, and Parliament sent 1,800 troops and two troops of horse from London under Colonel Richard Browne to suppress the rising. On 24 July Browne's force defeated the insurgents near Hilden bridge outside Tonbridge after "a very hot fight", and 200 royalists were captured in the town. According to the Parliamentary report, about 600 royalists fell back along the Medway to Yalding ("Yawling") and made a final stand there. Sir Miles Levesey placed his ordnance to bombard the town and offered terms. Some royalists slipped away overnight, and the next morning Levesey sent a Master Godfery to negotiate, after which 300 of the royalists fled and the rest surrendered. Levesey seized arms "enough to arme six hundred men", seventeen mounted pieces of ordnance and as many dismounted, many barrels of gunpowder and 150 horses. Local accounts place the fighting at Town Bridge. The engagement ended the 1643 rising, and there was little further fighting in Kent until the rising of 1648.

Yalding was a favourite of Edith Nesbit, author of The Railway Children, who wrote in the 1920s: "The Medway just above the Anchor [at Yalding, Kent] is a river of dreams...If you go to Yalding you may stay at the George and be comfortable in a little village that owns a haunted churchyard, a fine church, and one of the most beautiful bridges in Europe."

The village was home to a chemicals manufacturing works from 1912 to 2003. In the early years it manufactured soap, then progressed to crop protection products under Imperial Chemical Industries' Agrochemicals Division. It was run by Syngenta at the time of closure.

Garden Organic, previously known as the Henry Doubleday Research Association, the UK's leading organic growing charity, created a demonstration garden near the village. This was closed in 2007 but was leased and reopened by the business Maro Foods, in 2008. The gardens are now known as the Yalding Gardens.

== Buildings ==
St Peter's and St Paul's Church is a Grade I listed building. It is built from ragstone, and is judged to be from the 13th century. The tower turret has a weather vane dated 1734.

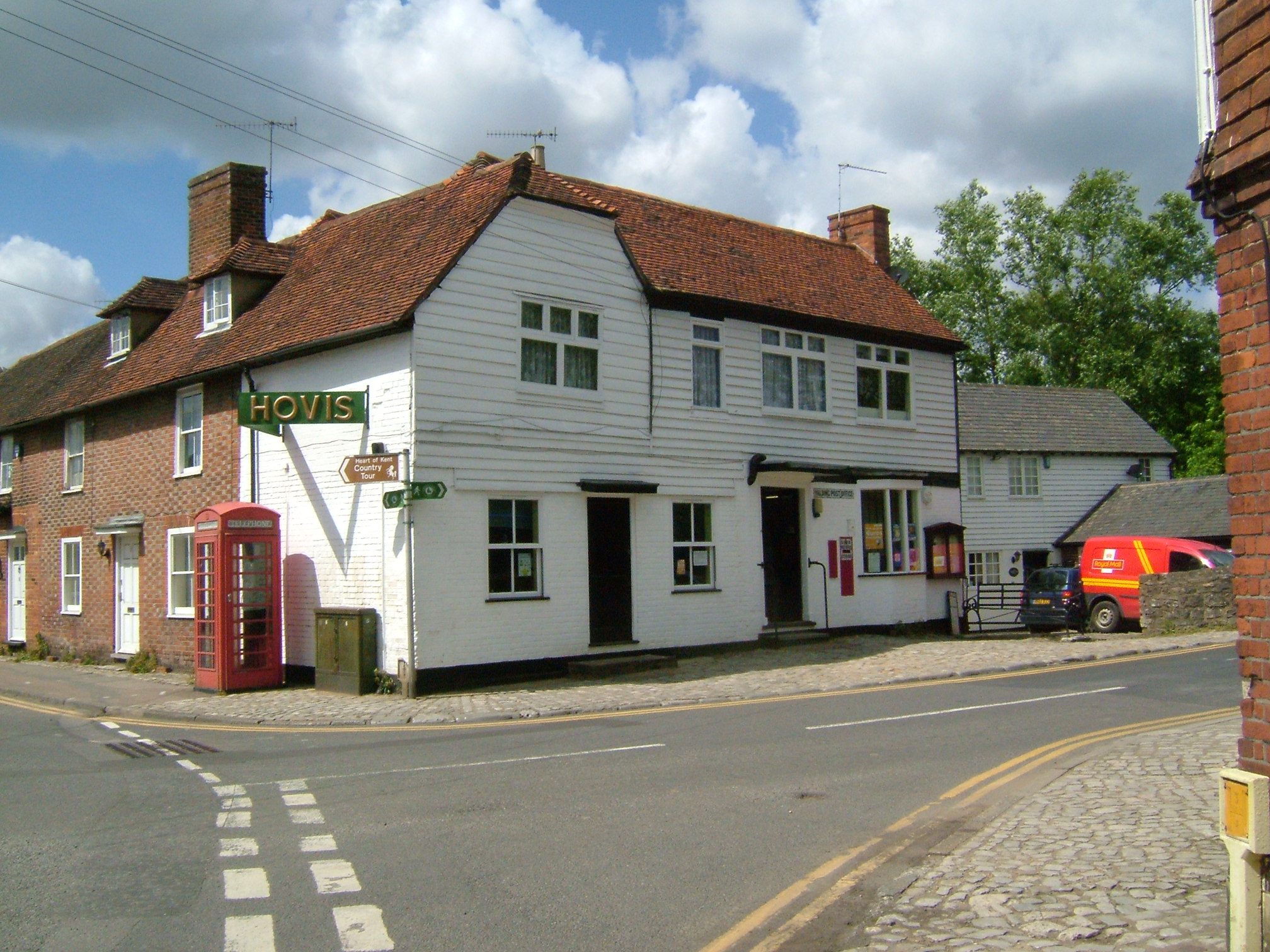
The Post Office on the High Street, at the end of Town Bridge, built with ship lap and peg tiles.

Yalding Baptist Church is located on Vicarage Road.

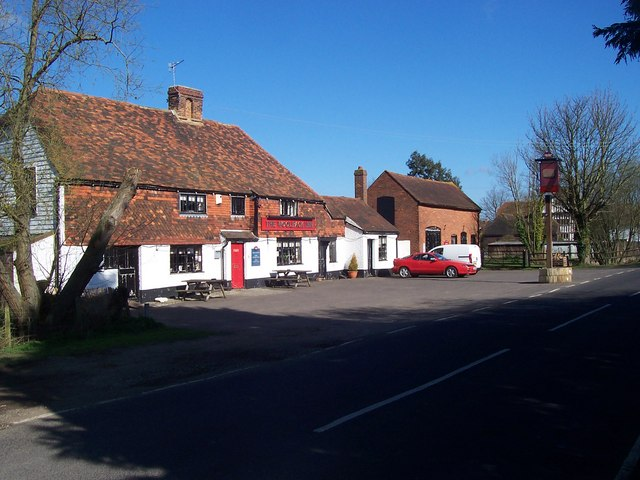
Woolpack Inn at Benover.

Benover has the Woolpack Inn with a hung tiles frontage.

== Rivers ==
Twyford Bridge crosses the River Medway. It is just downstream of the automatic sluice where the river drops from +11.2m to +7.41m above mean sea level, the navigation bears left through the Hampstead Rd Canal, and the Hampstead Lock, the main stream drops over the weir and sluice and is joined here by the River Teise (Lesser Teise) and both pass under Twyford Bridge. The river then flows in a loop towards the village where it is joined by the River Beult which has passed under Town Bridge. However the main stream of the River Teise flowed into the Beult near Benover, 3 km upstream of Town Bridge. Twyford Bridge is not navigable. Twyford bridge is 16 km from Allington, where the Medway becomes tidal. The medieval Town Bridge is built of ragstone in the 15th century, it has seven arches and spans the Beult and the marshy ground each side. It is reputed to be the longest existing medieval bridge in Kent being 150m in length.

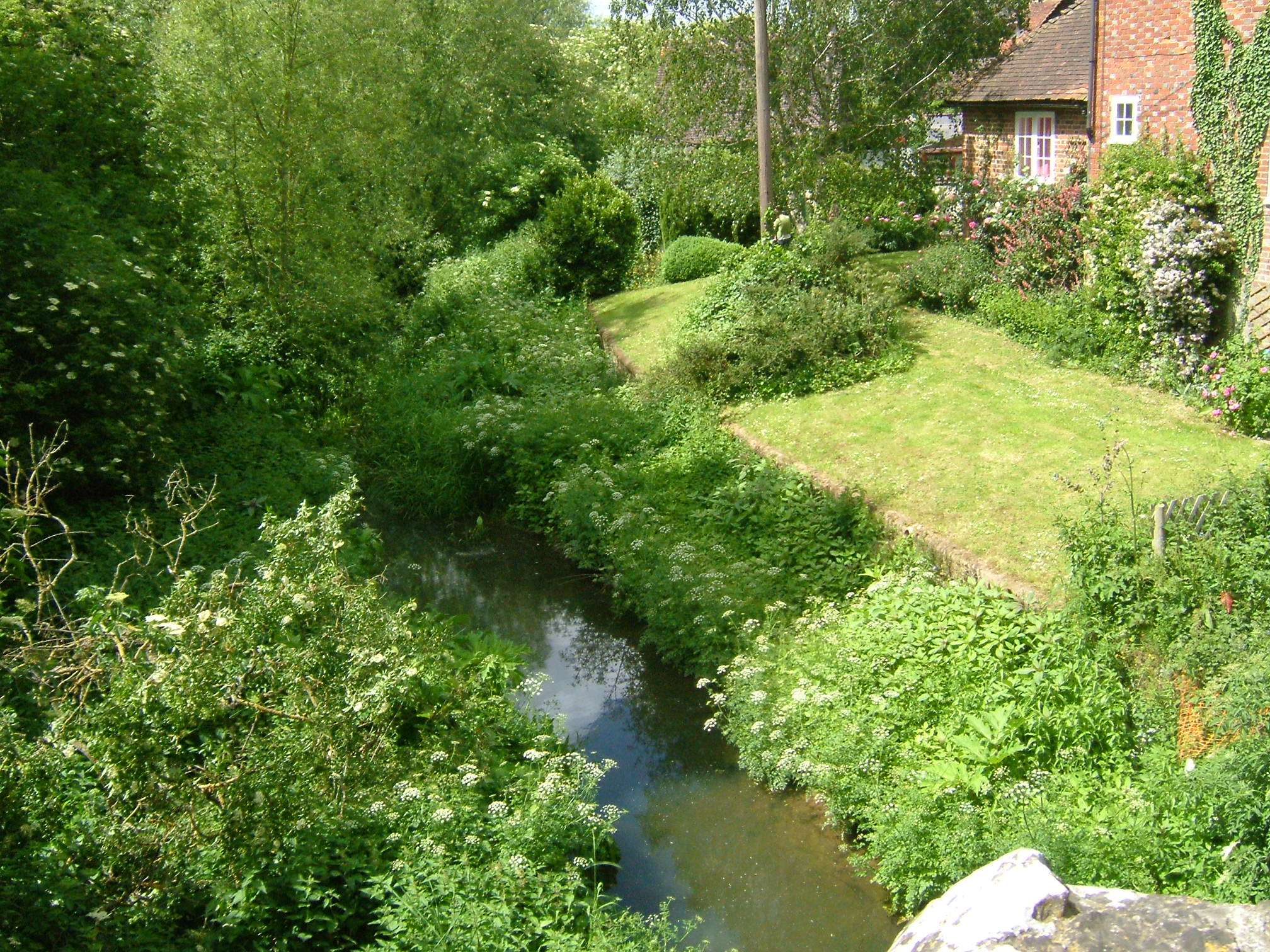
Riverside dwellings on the River Beult, photographed from Town Bridge.

=== Floods ===
Parts of Yalding that have flooded before are, e.g.:

- Christmas Day 1927
- eight times in the winter of 2000–1.
- in December 2013

== Transport ==
=== Buses ===
Yalding village and the surrounding area is served by a network of Nu-Venture routes. These include the 23 which runs from Maidstone to Goudhurst via East Farleigh, West Farleigh, Yalding, Laddingford, Collier Street, Claygate and Marden, with a timed connection onto the 297 'Wealden Link' to various settlements across the weald in Goudhurst . The 23A takes the same route as the 23 but serves Benover and terminates early at Laddingford and finally the 25 and 26 which runs via Hunton and terminating in the same loop as the 23A, with the 26 running direct via Dean Street and the 25 running via East Farleigh. The routes provide a roughly hourly morning frequency with 12 buses a day in each direction passing Yalding. There is also a Wednesday weekly 203 service to and from Paddock Wood run by Autocar. Hams Travel and Starline run School services to various destinations additionally.

=== Trains ===
Situated 1.1 miles away from the village itself, Yalding railway station lies on the Medway Valley Line which links Strood, Snodland, Maidstone, Yalding and Paddock Wood. The service is currently run by the Southeastern train operating company at a roughly half-hourly frequency.

== Education ==
The village primary school is St Peter's and St Paul's Church of England Primary School. At secondary level, the school is in the Mascalls Academy Comprehensive catchment area. However, the village is home to many children who attend grammar schools in the neighbouring town of Maidstone.

== Leisure ==
The Greensand Way long-distance footpath crosses the Medway at Twyford Bridge, and follows up the High Street, passes through Blunden Lane, and leaves the village by an ancient byway by Bustom Farm Cottages. The Medway Valley Walk follows the river from Tonbridge to the sluice on the east bank, then the Hampstead Lane Canal, and the river to Maidstone on the west bank.

Yalding Organic Garden has a display of fourteen individual gardens, demonstrating gardening through the last 800 years. The plants have been carefully chosen to make sure that they are accurate to their historical period.

Yalding had an annual contemporary music festival called 'The Vicar's Picnic', set on the edge of the village. Taking place every July it attracted up to 4,000 visitors who camped in adjoining fields. Notable acts included The Fun Lovin' Criminals, Starsailor, Reef, Norman Jay MBE, Seb Fontaine, Bruce Foxton, Nightmares on Wax, 90's Indie Britpop band Cast, Canterbury folk-hiphop act, 'Coco & the Butterfields' and The Bluetones lead vocalist Mark Morriss. The festival last took place in 2018.

The Yalding and District Beekeepers Association was formed in January 2011, by a group of local beekeepers, and meets monthly in the Chequers Inn, Laddingford.

There is a football club, formed in 2011 by S Faulkner for local children – Yalding and Laddingford FC based at the Kintons ground and the Jubilee field Laddingford with teams in the Maidstone and Mid Kent Sunday League. The teams are in Div 1 and 3. In 2012 club formed a side to play in the Tonbridge Saturday league . A new junior section of under 10's and under 13's was formed in 2013. In April 2014 the Saturday side won the club's first major trophy by winning the chairman's cup at Longmead Stadium and the following week the Sunday reserve side became league winners. Following this season the club was accepted into the Kent County League in division 3 East. The club has a junior section with 7 teams playing between the ages of 6 and 18. At present the club have 1 sides at u7 1 at u8, one each at u10, 2 at u11, 1 at u13 and 1 at u14 a junior futsal side and an u18 side.

== Notable people ==
- Edmund Blunden, (1896–1974), Great War poet, lived in Yalding during the first decade of the twentieth century and the village inspired more than fifty of his poems.
- Barry Evans, (1943–1997), actor best known for the sitcoms Doctor In The House and Mind Your Language, lived in Yalding for a short time.
- David Sadler, (b. 1946), football player, was born in Yalding.
