= Chainhurst =

Village in Kent, England

Coordinates: 51.201570°N 0.476610°E

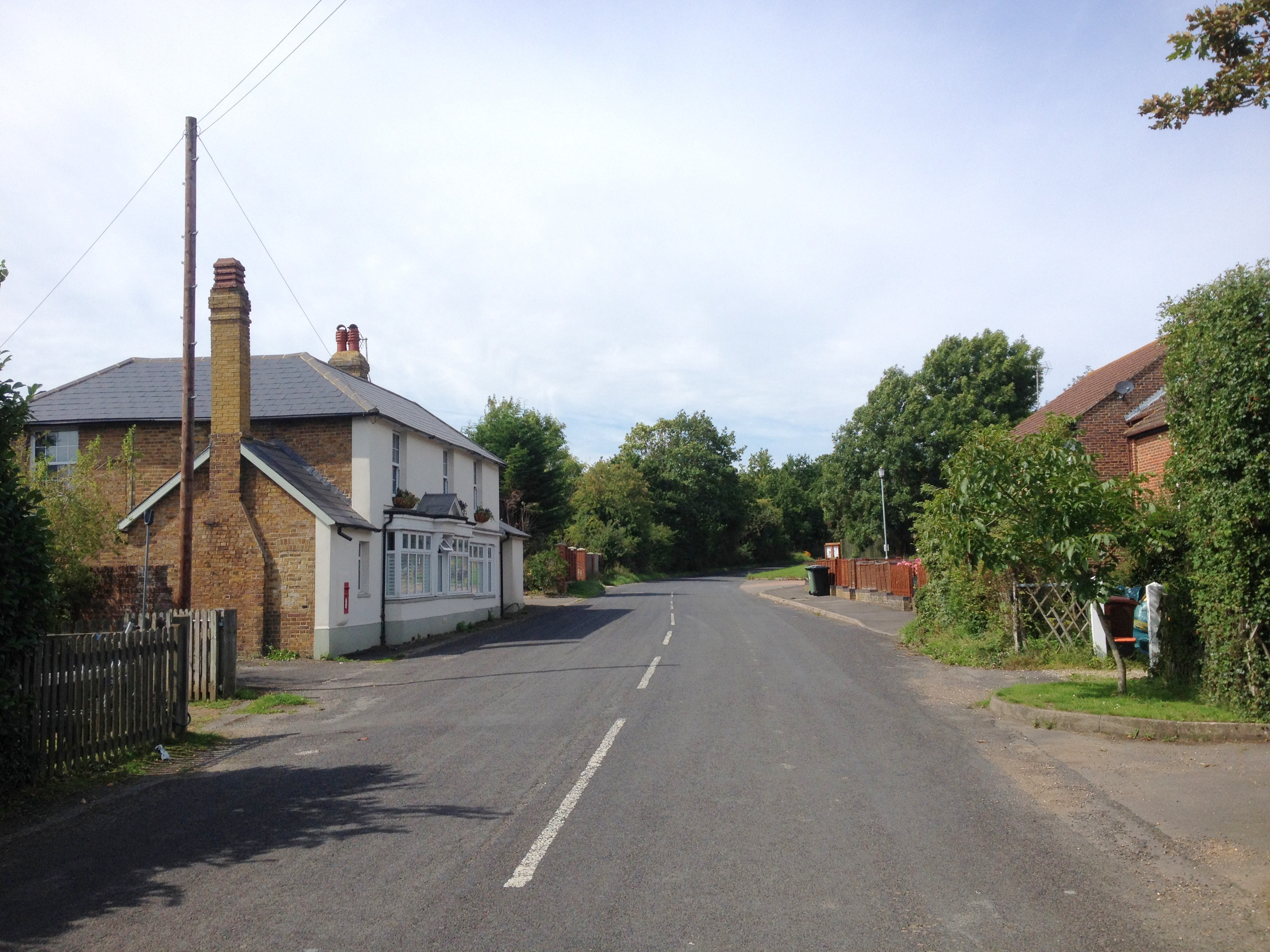
- Hunton Road

- Location within Kent
- Civil parish: Marden
- District: Maidstone
- Shire county: Kent
- Region: South East
- Country: England
- Sovereign state: United Kingdom
- Post town: Tonbridge
- Postcode district: TN12
- Dialling code: 01622
- Police: Kent
- Fire: Kent
- Ambulance: South East Coast
- UK Parliament: Weald of Kent

Chainhurst is a wealden village in Kent, England, and is part of Marden civil parish and Maidstone District. It is about 2 miles (3.2 km) north of Marden, below Bidborough Ridge, and south of the River Beult floodplain.

== Landmarks ==
Chainhurst Farmhouse is grade II* listed and parts of it date back to the 16th century.

== Economy ==
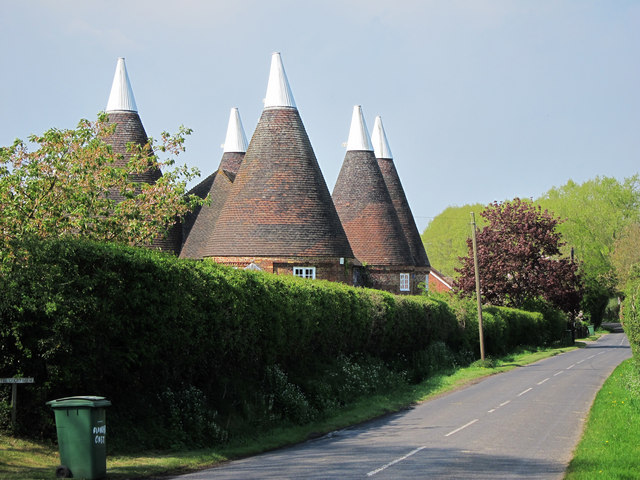
Oast houses, Chainhurst

Historically, Chainhurst's predominant employment was in agriculture.

Farmland near Chainhurst is used for orchards and arable crops. There were extensive hop gardens with several former oast houses surviving. The Hopper huts south of the bridge over the River Beult accommodated seasonal workers for the annual hop harvest.

Many residents now commute to work in London or elsewhere.

== Cyclo-cross ==
Since about 2000, Reed Court Farm has been a Cyclo-Cross venue in the sport's London and South East League.
