= Aeon Sportscars =

Aeon Sportscars Limited
- Company type: Limited company
- Industry: Automobiles
- Founded: 2000
- Headquarters: Marden, Kent
- Key people: Keith Wood, Suzan Heather Wood
- Website: https://www.aeonsportscars.com/

Aeon Sportscars Limited is a British manufacturer of automobiles.

== Company history ==
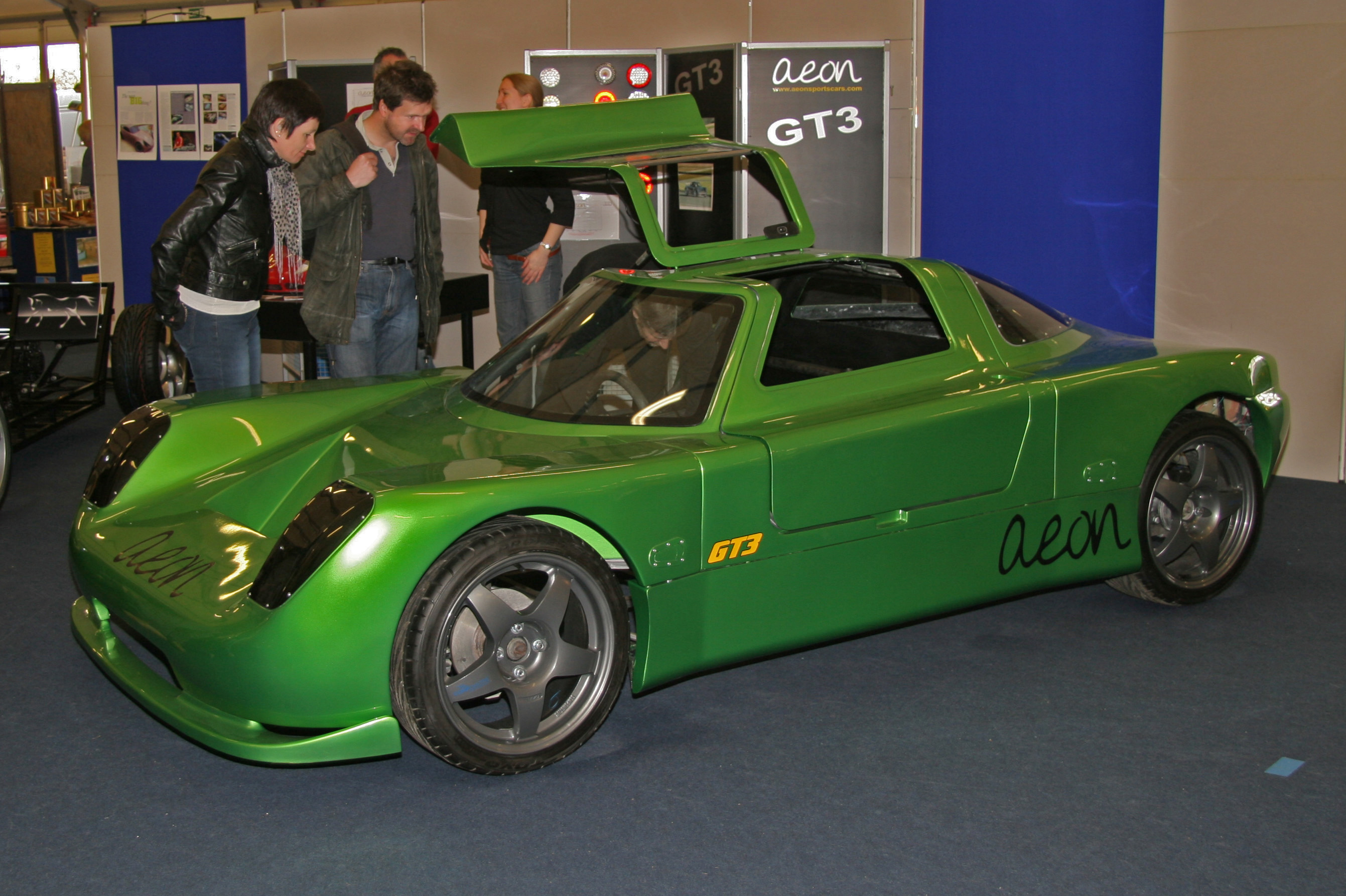
Aeon GT3 Coupe

The company was founded on November 3, 2000, in Marden, Kent. Keith Wood and John Timothy Hewat became directors on July 1, 2001. They began producing automobiles and kits in 2003. The brand name is Aeon. Since March 31, 2007, Susan Heather Wood has been the second director. Hewat left the company at the same time and founded Blaze Motorsport. Doncaster based Exceed Autocraft, led by Matthew Flett, was the licensee from 2011 to 2021. A total of around 17 copies have been created so far.

== Vehicles ==
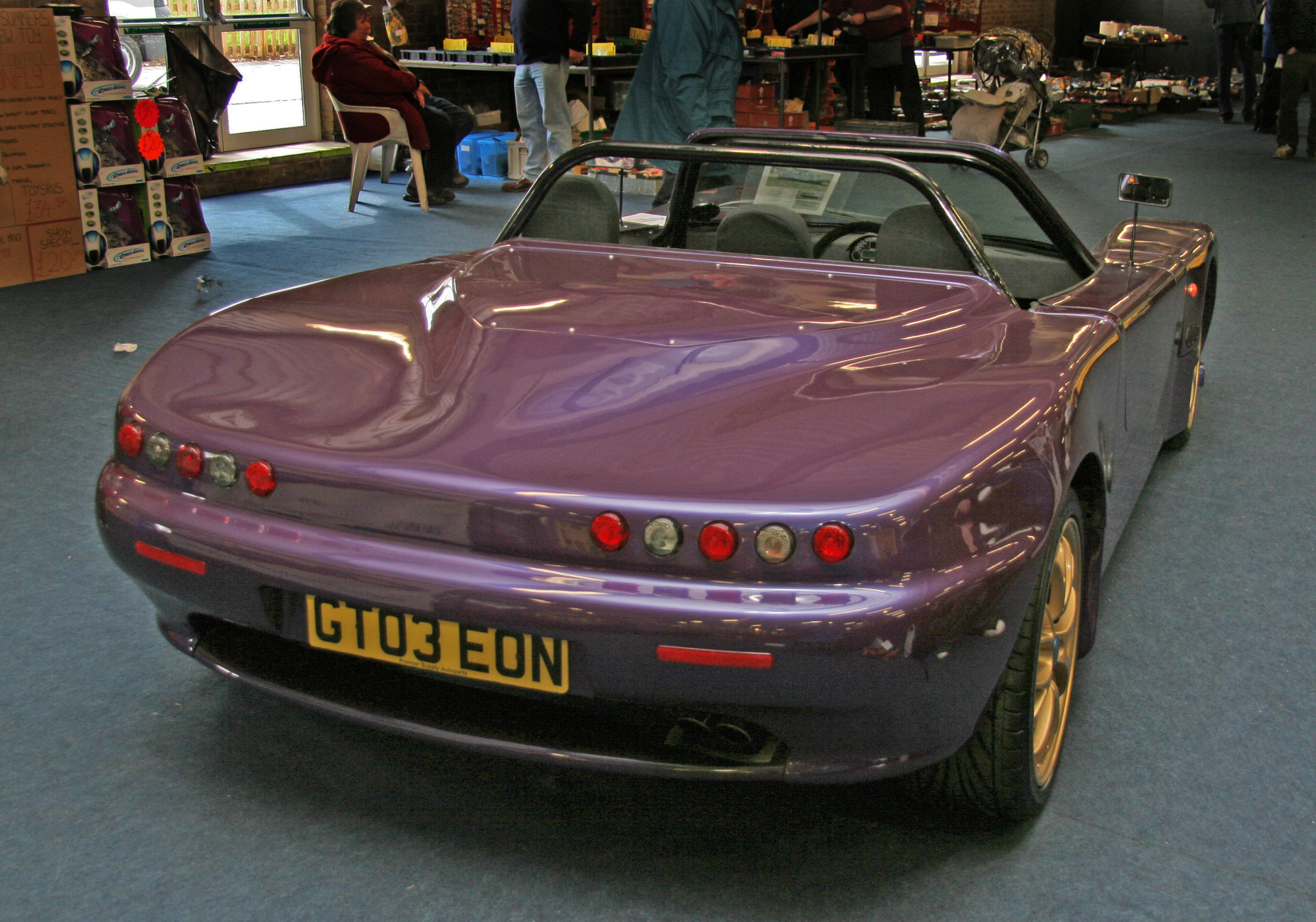
Aeon GT3 Spyder

The first model was the GT 3 Coupé in 2003. Special features of the coupé are the three-seater design, with the driver sitting in the middle, and the gullwing doors. The engine usually comes from Ford. The GT 2 Coupé, which has been available since 2011, conventionally has two seats next to each other. The coupés have found around twelve buyers so far.

The GT 3 Spyder appeared in 2004. This is the open version of the coupe. The vehicles are usually powered by a four-cylinder engine from Volkswagen with a displacement of 1,800 cm^{3} and a turbocharger. Initially also three-seater, since 2011 there has also been the GT 2 Spyder and GT 2 Aero with two seats next to each other. So far, around five copies of the Spyder have been built.

The Epona was designed by Garry Gooderham. Aeon Sportscars presented a model at a trade fair in 2009, but did not put it into series production. Exceed Autocraft has been trying since 2011. This lightweight, front-engine, rear-wheel-drive sports car is planned as a coupe and roadster.

== Literature ==
- Steve Hole: A-Z of Kit Cars. The definitive encyclopaedia of the UK's kit-car industry since 1949 Haynes Publishing, Sparkford 2012, ISBN 978-1-84425-677-8, p. 20–21 and 86.
