= St Margaret's Church, Collier Street =

Parish church in the village of Collier Street, Kent, England

Coordinates: 51.187714°N 0.455627°E

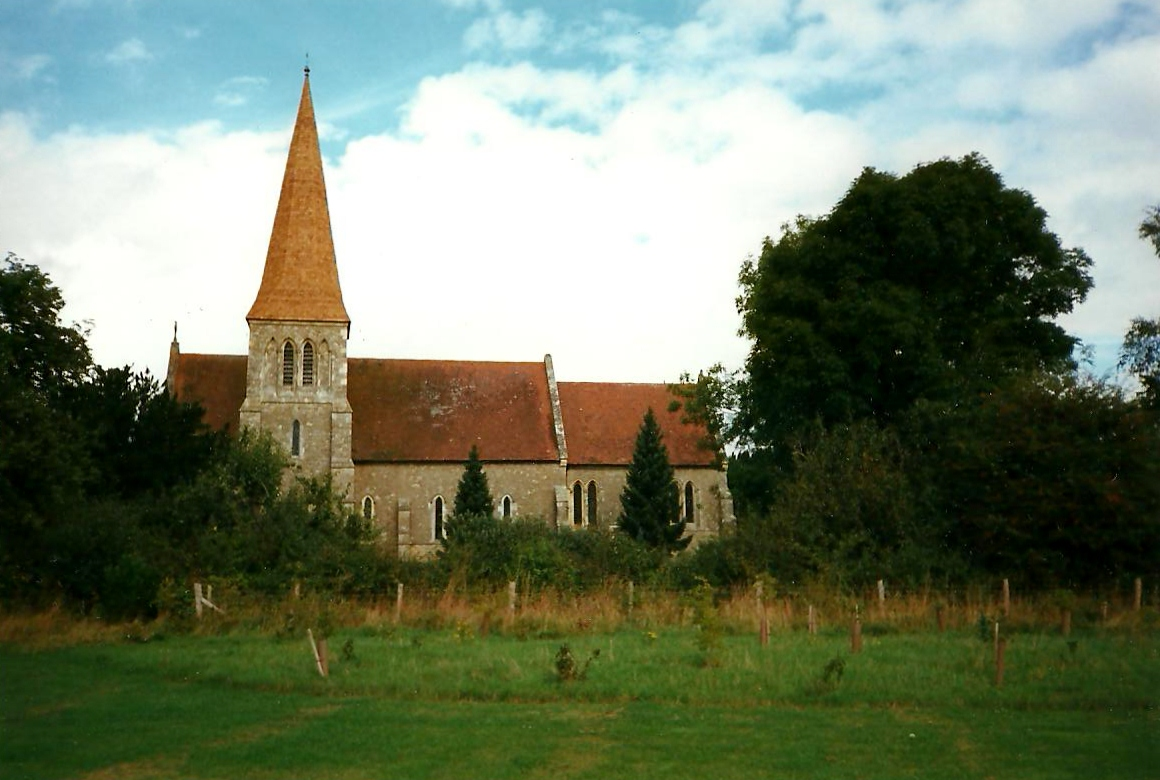

- Location within Kent
- OS grid reference: TQ 71703 46035
- Location: Collier Street, Kent
- Country: England
- Denomination: Anglican
- Website: yaldingchurches.co.uk/collier-street-1

History
- Status: Parish church

Architecture
- Functional status: Active
- Heritage designation: Grade II
- Designated: 14 October 1987
- Completed: 1848

Administration
- Province: Canterbury
- Diocese: Rochester
- Archdeaconry: Tonbridge
- Deanery: Paddock Wood
- Parish: St. Margaret Collier Street

St Margaret's Church is a parish church in the village of Collier Street, Kent, England. It is a Grade II listed building.

== Building ==
St Margaret's Church is located next to the junction between Green Lane and the B2162.

The building is Grade II listed, built in a 13th century style, set in a ragstone walled churchyard (closed by order in council).

== History ==
St. Margaret’s was built as a daughter church of Yalding in 1848. Collier Street became a parish in its own right in 1858 and remained a sole living until 1969 when it was reunited with Yalding to become the United Benefice of Yalding with Laddingford and Collier Street.
