= Yalding Organic Gardens =

Gardens in Kent, England

Coordinates: 51.2160°N 0.4298°E

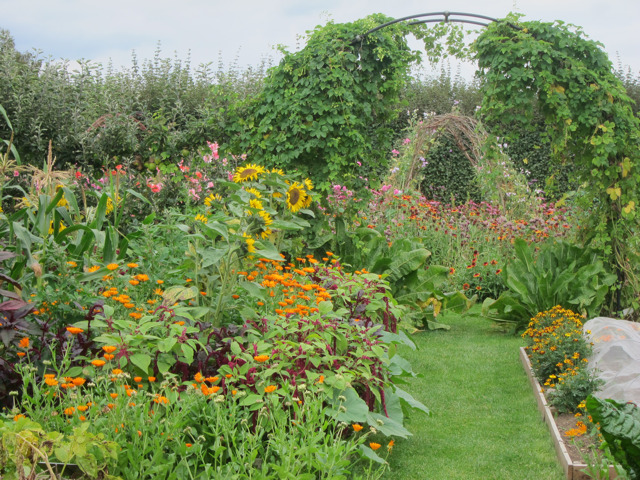
Yalding gardens

Yalding Gardens were demonstration gardens open to the public near Yalding, Kent in April 1995.

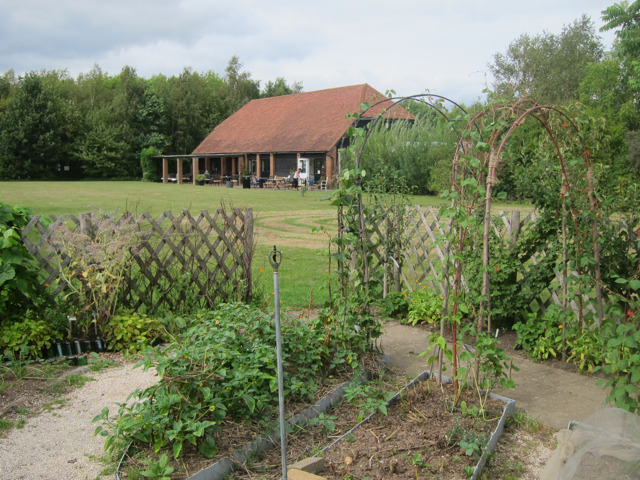
The farmshop and café

Originally established by the organic gardening charity HDRA (now called Garden Organic), the gardens were established to show a range of organically maintained kitchen and other garden types throughout history. Visitors could explore the history of gardening through 18 gardens set in five acres of Kent countryside. The 13th-century apothecary's garden and Victorian artisan's glasshouse demonstrated the unique results yielded through organic gardening methods.

In 2007, the gardens were closed due to lack of funding. However, in 2008, the site was leased by its owners, the Congelow Trust, to Maro Foods, but it was closed again in December 2009. The gardens re-opened as “The Yalding Gardens and Bushel Box Farmshop and Cafe” on 12 June 2010–only to close again in October 2011.

Since 2017 it has been a spring and summer wedding venue The Gardens Yalding.

The 'Friends of Yalding Organic Gardens' (FOYOG) has been formed with the aim of trying to secure a sound and sustainable future for the Gardens, and their website can be found at www.foyog.org
