= Listed buildings in Marden, Kent =

Historic structures in Kent, England

Marden is a village and civil parish in the Borough of Maidstone of Kent, England It contains one grade I, three grade II* and 125 grade II listed buildings that are recorded in the National Heritage List for England.

This list is based on the information retrieved online from Historic England.

== Key ==
Grade	Criteria
I	Buildings that are of exceptional interest
II*	Particularly important buildings of more than special interest
II	Buildings that are of special interest

== Listing ==
Name	Grade	Location	Type	Completed (Note: The date given is the date used by Historic England as significant for the initial building or that of an important part in the structure's description.)	Date designated	Grid ref. (Note: The grid reference is based on the British national grid reference system, sometimes known as OSGB36, used by the Ordnance Survey.) Geo-coordinates	Notes	Entry number (Note: The "List Entry Number" is a unique number assigned to each listed building and scheduled monument by Historic England.)	Image	Wikidata
Oast House at Beech Farm	II				17 September 1992	TQ7320243082; 51°09′39″N 0°28′32″E		1262042	Upload Photo	Q26552944
Albion House	II	Albion Road			23 March 1987	TQ7467744413; 51°10′20″N 0°29′50″E		1060706	Upload Photo	Q26313879
Bishop House Jewell House	II	Albion Road			23 May 1967	TQ7473744227; 51°10′14″N 0°29′53″E		1060707	Upload Photo	Q26313880
Marden Farm Shop	II	Albion Road			23 May 1967	TQ7469844492; 51°10′23″N 0°29′52″E		1038292	Upload Photo	Q26290008
Monkton House	II	Albion Road			23 March 1987	TQ7470044448; 51°10′21″N 0°29′52″E		1060704	Upload Photo	Q26313877
Pump About 10 Metres West of Allens	II	Albion Road			23 March 1987	TQ7471644417; 51°10′20″N 0°29′52″E		1060705	Upload Photo	Q26313878
Working Mens Club	II	Albion Road			23 March 1987	TQ7470744475; 51°10′22″N 0°29′52″E		1060703	Upload Photo	Q26313876
Barn About 10 Metres West of Wanshurst	II	Battle Lane			23 March 1987	TQ7633045285; 51°10′47″N 0°31′17″E		1060708	Upload Photo	Q26313881
Barn About 15 Metres East of Summerhill House	II	Battle Lane			23 March 1987	TQ7591545983; 51°11′10″N 0°30′57″E		1045847	Upload Photo	Q26297957
Barn About 25 Metres South West of Verrells Cottages	II	Battle Lane			23 March 1987	TQ7562445985; 51°11′10″N 0°30′42″E		1344393	Upload Photo	Q26628121
Barn About 40 Metres South South West of Manor Farmhouse	II	Battle Lane			23 March 1987	TQ7616145102; 51°10′41″N 0°31′08″E		1060674	Upload Photo	Q26313838
Blue House Cottage	II	Battle Lane			23 March 1987	TQ7584646059; 51°11′12″N 0°30′53″E		1045872	Upload Photo	Q26297981
Blue House Cottages	II	1 and 2, Battle Lane			23 March 1987	TQ7592046030; 51°11′11″N 0°30′57″E		1060710	Upload Photo	Q26313883
Little Wanshurst	II	Battle Lane			23 March 1987	TQ7630945375; 51°10′50″N 0°31′16″E		1344411	Upload Photo	Q26628139
Manor Farmhouse	II	Battle Lane			23 March 1987	TQ7615245166; 51°10′43″N 0°31′08″E		1060673	Upload Photo	Q26313837
Mile Bush Farmhouse	II	Battle Lane			23 May 1967	TQ7551545916; 51°11′08″N 0°30′36″E		1045879	Upload Photo	Q26297989
Oasthouse About 15 Metres North North East of Summerhill House	II	Battle Lane			23 March 1987	TQ7589346003; 51°11′10″N 0°30′56″E		1060712	Upload Photo	Q26313885
Oasthouse About 30 Metres North West of Manor Farmhouse	II	Battle Lane			23 March 1987	TQ7612645196; 51°10′44″N 0°31′06″E		1344412	Upload Photo	Q26628140
Reeves Cottage	II	Battle Lane			23 March 1987	TQ7615544981; 51°10′37″N 0°31′07″E		1060675	Upload Photo	Q26313840
Sharps	II	Battle Lane			23 March 1987	TQ7563545920; 51°11′08″N 0°30′42″E		1060711	Upload Photo	Q26313884
Summerhill House	II	Battle Lane			23 March 1987	TQ7588645984; 51°11′10″N 0°30′55″E		1045834	Upload Photo	Q26297940
Wanshurst	II	Battle Lane			23 March 1987	TQ7635145286; 51°10′47″N 0°31′18″E		1060709	Upload Photo	Q26313882
Wanshurst Green Farmhouse	II	Battle Lane			23 March 1987	TQ7643845305; 51°10′47″N 0°31′23″E		1344392	Upload Photo	Q26628120
White Cottage	II	Battle Lane			23 March 1987	TQ7627945235; 51°10′45″N 0°31′14″E		1344391	Upload Photo	Q26628119
Barn About 150 Metres South of Beech Farmhouse	II	Beech Road			13 January 1987	TQ7322042939; 51°09′34″N 0°28′33″E		1344416	Upload Photo	Q26628144
Barn About 26 Metres North of Blackmoor Farmhouse	II	Beech Road			23 March 1987	TQ7340143088; 51°09′39″N 0°28′42″E		1060679	Upload Photo	Q26313846
Beech Farmhouse	II	Beech Road			23 March 1987	TQ7325343098; 51°09′39″N 0°28′35″E		1054841	Upload Photo	Q26306494
Beechin House	II	Beech Road			23 March 1987	TQ7341643145; 51°09′41″N 0°28′43″E		1344413	Upload Photo	Q26628141
Blackmoor Farmhouse	II	Beech Road			23 March 1987	TQ7338643050; 51°09′38″N 0°28′42″E		1060678	Upload Photo	Q26313844
Cornwells	II	Beech Road			23 May 1967	TQ7356342926; 51°09′33″N 0°28′51″E		1367062	Upload Photo	Q26648595
Willows	II	Beech Road			23 May 1967	TQ7350843072; 51°09′38″N 0°28′48″E		1054874	Upload Photo	Q26306520
Bank House, Bridgelands Cottage and Greenheys Cottage	II	Bridgelands Cottage And Greenheys Cottage, High Street, Tonbridge, TN12 9DS			23 May 1967	TQ7469444519; 51°10′24″N 0°29′51″E		1060655	Upload Photo	Q26313812
Church Green House	II	Church Green			23 March 1987	TQ7426944600; 51°10′27″N 0°29′30″E		1054780	Upload Photo	Q26306434
Church of St Michael and All Angels	I	Church Green, TN12 9HN			23 May 1967	TQ7442344643; 51°10′28″N 0°29′38″E		1054804	Church of St Michael and All Angels More images	Q7594866
Stocks About 1/2 Metre South of South Aisle of Church of St Michael and All Angels	II	Church Green			23 March 1987	TQ7441744631; 51°10′28″N 0°29′37″E		1344417	Upload Photo	Q96097897
Barn About 50 Metres North West of Old Timbers	II	Dairy Lane			23 March 1987	TQ7242848056; 51°12′20″N 0°28′01″E		1055875	Upload Photo	Q26307495
Reed Place Farmhouse	II	Dairy Lane			23 March 1987	TQ7270347946; 51°12′17″N 0°28′15″E		1055863	Upload Photo	Q26307483
Tithe Barn	II	Dairy Lane			13 January 1987	TQ7271047426; 51°12′00″N 0°28′14″E		1060682	Upload Photo	Q26313850
Barn About 15 Metres North of Loves Farmhouse	II	Goudhurst Road			23 March 1987	TQ7365541913; 51°09′00″N 0°28′53″E		1366598	Upload Photo	Q26648182
Barn About 30 Metres North West of Great Cheveney House	II	Goudhurst Road			23 March 1987	TQ7356342278; 51°09′12″N 0°28′49″E		1344418	Upload Photo	Q26628145
Barn About 30 Metres North West of Tanner House	II	Goudhurst Road			23 March 1987	TQ7322341558; 51°08′49″N 0°28′31″E		1344419	Upload Photo	Q26628146
Barn About 30 Metres West of Great Cheveney House	II	Goudhurst Road			23 March 1987	TQ7352942239; 51°09′11″N 0°28′48″E		1055818	Upload Photo	Q26307439
Beale Farm House	II	Goudhurst Road			23 May 1967	TQ7386442897; 51°09′32″N 0°29′06″E		1055824	Upload Photo	Q26307445
Brewhouse About 6 Metres East of South End of Great Cheveney House	II	Goudhurst Road			23 March 1987	TQ7358842215; 51°09′10″N 0°28′51″E		1060686	Upload Photo	Q26313856
Former Stables About 20 Metres South West of Great Cheveney House	II	Goudhurst Road			23 March 1987	TQ7355342206; 51°09′10″N 0°28′49″E		1060687	Upload Photo	Q26313858
Great Cheveney	II	Goudhurst Road			23 May 1967	TQ7376742309; 51°09′13″N 0°29′00″E		1060685	Upload Photo	Q26313855
Great Cheveney House Great Cheveney House South	II*	Goudhurst Road			23 May 1967	TQ7357842234; 51°09′11″N 0°28′50″E		1055805	Upload Photo	Q17544960
Loves Farmhouse	II	Goudhurst Road			23 March 1987	TQ7364741881; 51°08′59″N 0°28′53″E		1060688	Upload Photo	Q26313859
Oasthouse About 30 Metres West of Tanner House	II	Goudhurst Road			23 March 1987	TQ7320341522; 51°08′48″N 0°28′30″E		1366622	Upload Photo	Q26648203
Oasthouse About 6 Metres North of Springfield Farmhouse	II	Goudhurst Road			23 March 1987	TQ7395442681; 51°09′25″N 0°29′10″E		1055847	Upload Photo	Q26307470
Springfield Farmhouse	II	Goudhurst Road			23 March 1987	TQ7395542663; 51°09′24″N 0°29′10″E		1060683	Upload Photo	Q26313852
Tanner House	II	Goudhurst Road			23 May 1967	TQ7325441526; 51°08′48″N 0°28′32″E		1366631	Upload Photo	Q26648212
Turkey Farm House	II	Goudhurst Road			18 December 1986	TQ7346144615; 51°10′28″N 0°28′48″E		1060684	Upload Photo	Q26313853
2, 4 and 6 High Street	II	2, 4 and 6, High Street, Tonbridge, TN12 9DP			23 March 1987	TQ7464644528; 51°10′24″N 0°29′49″E		1344405	Upload Photo	Q26628133
Cornerways	II	High Street			23 May 1967	TQ7463944580; 51°10′26″N 0°29′49″E		1057687	Upload Photo	Q26309855
Former Stables About 60 Metres South East of the Bridge House	II	High Street			23 March 1987	TQ7458744538; 51°10′24″N 0°29′46″E		1060657	Upload Photo	Q26313815
John's Hairdresser, Marsida, and the Old Sweet Shop	II	High Street, Tonbridge, TN12 9DP			23 March 1987	TQ7464044540; 51°10′24″N 0°29′49″E		1060658	Upload Photo	Q26313816
Milestone Adjacent to East Elevation of White Lyon House	II	High Street			23 March 1987	TQ7460344584; 51°10′26″N 0°29′47″E		1060691	Upload Photo	Q26313864
Old Church Cottage	II	High Street			23 March 1987	TQ7445144615; 51°10′27″N 0°29′39″E		1055737	Upload Photo	Q26309485
Railings About 3 Metres East of Shepherd's House	II	High Street			23 March 1987	TQ7447844616; 51°10′27″N 0°29′41″E		1344420	Upload Photo	Q26628147
Railings About 3 Metres South and East of Shepherd's House	II	High Street			23 March 1987	TQ7447644606; 51°10′27″N 0°29′40″E		1345571	Upload Photo	Q26629182
Rose's Shop Smeeton the Woodstove Trading Company	II	High Street			23 May 1967	TQ7465244570; 51°10′25″N 0°29′49″E		1344421	Upload Photo	Q26628148
Shepherd's House	II	High Street			23 May 1967	TQ7446944615; 51°10′27″N 0°29′40″E		1060690	Upload Photo	Q26313862
The Bridge House	II	High Street			23 May 1967	TQ7457044562; 51°10′25″N 0°29′45″E		1060656	Upload Photo	Q26313813
The Cottage	II	High Street			23 May 1967	TQ7450944578; 51°10′26″N 0°29′42″E		1344403	Upload Photo	Q26628131
The Old Seed Shop and Shipton Cottage	II	High Street, Tonbridge, TN12 9DP			23 March 1987	TQ7463544551; 51°10′25″N 0°29′48″E		1344404	Upload Photo	Q26628132
The Place	II	High Street			23 May 1967	TQ7467244544; 51°10′24″N 0°29′50″E		1060692	Upload Photo	Q26313865
Turnpike House	II	High Street			23 May 1967	TQ7466344555; 51°10′25″N 0°29′50″E		1374152	Upload Photo	Q26655051
Vine House	II	High Street			23 May 1967	TQ7468344532; 51°10′24″N 0°29′51″E		1344441	Upload Photo	Q26628162
Ward and Partners	II	High Street			23 May 1967	TQ7467944536; 51°10′24″N 0°29′51″E		1060654	Upload Photo	Q26313810
White Lyon House	II*	High Street			23 May 1967	TQ7459744593; 51°10′26″N 0°29′47″E		1345537	Upload Photo	Q17545415
Barn About 20 Metres North West of Stone Pit Farmhouse	II	Howland Road			23 March 1987	TQ7531044463; 51°10′21″N 0°30′23″E		1060662	Upload Photo	Q26313822
Bridgehurst Farmhouse	II	Howland Road			23 March 1987	TQ7526344634; 51°10′27″N 0°30′21″E		1352657	Upload Photo	Q26635645
Jewel Cottages	II	1 and 2, Howland Road			23 May 1967	TQ7478744444; 51°10′21″N 0°29′56″E		1060660	Upload Photo	Q26313819
Mote Cottage	II	Howland Road			23 March 1987	TQ7569844560; 51°10′24″N 0°30′43″E		1031814	Upload Photo	Q26283205
Pastures End and Poachers Keep	II	Howland Road, Tonbridge, TN12 9EP			23 March 1987	TQ7520944610; 51°10′26″N 0°30′18″E		1060661	Upload Photo	Q26313821
Stone Pit Farmhouse	II	Howland Road			23 March 1987	TQ7532344432; 51°10′20″N 0°30′24″E		1031808	Upload Photo	Q26283198
The Old House	II	Howland Road			25 July 1952	TQ7515344598; 51°10′26″N 0°30′15″E		1376660	Upload Photo	Q26657192
Vine Cottage Yeoman Cottage	II	Howland Road			23 March 1987	TQ7496044547; 51°10′24″N 0°30′05″E		1344406	Upload Photo	Q26628134
Barn About 15 Metres West South West of New Lodge House	II	Hunton Road			23 March 1987	TQ7315547038; 51°11′47″N 0°28′37″E		1031338	Upload Photo	Q26282696
Barn About 20 Metres South West of Mill Farmhouse	II	Hunton Road			23 March 1987	TQ7359545683; 51°11′02″N 0°28′57″E		1344407	Upload Photo	Q26628135
Barn About 25 Metres South East of Reed Court	II	Hunton Road			23 March 1987	TQ7300748077; 51°12′21″N 0°28′31″E		1031361	Upload Photo	Q26282722
Barn About 3 Metres North West of Murzie Farmhouse	II	Hunton Road			23 March 1987	TQ7345046291; 51°11′22″N 0°28′51″E		1025895	Upload Photo	Q26276824
Barn About 40 Metres North West Chainhurst Farmhouse	II	Hunton Road			23 March 1987	TQ7306247984; 51°12′17″N 0°28′34″E		1060664	Upload Photo	Q26313824
Barn About 70 Metres North North West of Gatehouse Farmhouse	II	Hunton Road			9 June 1982	TQ7356146047; 51°11′14″N 0°28′56″E		1060665	Upload Photo	Q26313825
Chainhurst Farmhouse	II*	Hunton Road			23 May 1967	TQ7309447947; 51°12′16″N 0°28′35″E		1060663	Upload Photo	Q17544972
Former Barn About 30 Metres North North West of Chainhurst Farmhouse	II	Hunton Road			23 March 1987	TQ7308147987; 51°12′18″N 0°28′34″E		1376655	Upload Photo	Q26657187
Former Stables About 23 Metres South East of Orchard Dene	II	Hunton Road			23 March 1987	TQ7324447483; 51°12′01″N 0°28′42″E		1031794	Upload Photo	Q26283183
Gatehouse Farmhouse	II	Hunton Road			23 May 1967	TQ7358245965; 51°11′12″N 0°28′57″E		1060666	Upload Photo	Q26313827
Marden Mill Mill Farmhouse	II	Hunton Road			23 May 1967	TQ7362045697; 51°11′03″N 0°28′58″E		1031387	Upload Photo	Q26282748
Murzie Farmhouse	II	Hunton Road			23 March 1987	TQ7344046272; 51°11′22″N 0°28′50″E		1344408	Upload Photo	Q26628136
New Lodge House	II	Hunton Road			23 May 1967	TQ7318947045; 51°11′47″N 0°28′38″E		1060667	Upload Photo	Q26313828
Oasthouse About 40 Metres West of Gatehouse Farmhouse	II	Hunton Road			23 March 1987	TQ7353645958; 51°11′11″N 0°28′54″E		1060668	Upload Photo	Q26313829
Church Farm House	II	Maidstone Road			23 March 1987	TQ7479844901; 51°10′36″N 0°29′57″E		1060669	Upload Photo	Q26313831
Oasthouse About 15 Metres South of Stilebridge Farmhouse	II	Maidstone Road			20 December 1984	TQ7609346941; 51°11′40″N 0°31′08″E		1025304	Upload Photo	Q26276167
Oasthouse About 3 Metres East of Church Farm House	II	Maidstone Road			23 March 1987	TQ7481144900; 51°10′36″N 0°29′58″E		1025875	Upload Photo	Q26276803
Stilebridge Farmhouse	II	Maidstone Road			23 March 1987	TQ7609146974; 51°11′41″N 0°31′08″E		1344409	Upload Photo	Q26628137
The Old Vicarage	II	Maidstone Road			23 May 1967	TQ7473044799; 51°10′33″N 0°29′54″E		1060670	Upload Photo	Q26313832
Barn About 15 Metres West of Mountain Farmhouse	II	Park Road			23 March 1987	TQ7613444352; 51°10′17″N 0°31′05″E		1344410	Upload Photo	Q26628138
Mountain Farmhouse	II	Park Road			23 March 1987	TQ7616644359; 51°10′17″N 0°31′07″E		1025309	Upload Photo	Q26276172
Nash Cottage	II	Park Road			23 March 1987	TQ7576042565; 51°09′19″N 0°30′43″E		1203220	Upload Photo	Q26498772
Susans Farm	II	Park Road			23 March 1987	TQ7559942530; 51°09′18″N 0°30′35″E		1060671	Upload Photo	Q26313834
Thorn Cottage	II	Park Road			23 May 1967	TQ7591243064; 51°09′35″N 0°30′52″E		1344433	Upload Photo	Q26628157
Church Green Cottage	II	1 and 2, Pattenden Lane			23 March 1987	TQ7419944703; 51°10′30″N 0°29′26″E		1203232	Upload Photo	Q26498784
Poulters Hall	II	Plain Road			29 June 1982	TQ7443443656; 51°09′56″N 0°29′37″E		1060672	Upload Photo	Q26313835
Sherenden Farmhouse	II	Sherenden Lane			23 March 1987	TQ7408042019; 51°09′03″N 0°29′16″E		1281775	Upload Photo	Q26570790
Barn About 50 Metres East of Old Herstfield Farmhouse	II	Staplehurst Road			19 May 1986	TQ7660247722; 51°12′05″N 0°31′35″E		1344432	Upload Photo	Q26628156
Home Farmhouse	II	Staplehurst Road			23 March 1987	TQ7779846559; 51°11′26″N 0°32′35″E		1203265	Upload Photo	Q26498816
Old Hertsfield Farmhouse	II	Staplehurst Road			23 March 1987	TQ7653347724; 51°12′05″N 0°31′32″E		1281781	Upload Photo	Q26570796
Stilebridge Cottage	II	Staplehurst Road			23 March 1987	TQ7608147510; 51°11′59″N 0°31′08″E		1060633	Upload Photo	Q26313784
Little Tilden Farmhouse	II	Stilebridge Lane			23 March 1987	TQ7524847093; 51°11′46″N 0°30′24″E		1060634	Upload Photo	Q26313786
Little Hickmotts	II	Summerhill Road			23 March 1987	TQ7673745668; 51°10′59″N 0°31′39″E		1203272	Upload Photo	Q26498823
Sutton Forge Oast	II	Sutton Forge, Smarden, Tonbridge, TN12 9DY			23 March 1987	TQ7463244504; 51°10′23″N 0°29′48″E		1060659	Upload Photo	Q26313818
Ashley House	II	Thorn Road			23 March 1987	TQ7556843252; 51°09′42″N 0°30′34″E		1203278	Upload Photo	Q26498829
Longridge	II	Thorn Road			23 March 1987	TQ7541943587; 51°09′53″N 0°30′27″E		1060635	Upload Photo	Q26313787
Thorn Farmhouse	II	Thorn Road			23 March 1987	TQ7591843107; 51°09′37″N 0°30′52″E		1060642	Upload Photo	Q26313798
Former Granary About 3 Metres North of Great Tilden Farmhouse	II	Tilden Lane			23 March 1987	TQ7484047681; 51°12′06″N 0°30′05″E		1203294	Upload Photo	Q26498843
Great Tilden Farmhouse	II	Tilden Lane			23 March 1987	TQ7486247664; 51°12′05″N 0°30′06″E		1060636	Upload Photo	Q26313789
The Barn	II	Tilden Lane			23 May 1967	TQ7485847616; 51°12′04″N 0°30′05″E		1344434	Upload Photo	Q26628158
Chambers Cottages Chambers Cottages and Underlynn Farm Cottages Underlynn Farm Cottages	II	1, 2 and 3, Underlynn Lane, Underling			23 May 1967	TQ7568046615; 51°11′30″N 0°30′46″E		1203308	Upload Photo	Q26498856
Copt Hall Farmhouse	II	Underlynn Lane			23 March 1987	TQ7452445948; 51°11′10″N 0°29′45″E		1060637	Upload Photo	Q26313790
Little Mill Cottages	II	5 and 6, Underlynn Lane			23 March 1987	TQ7423845823; 51°11′06″N 0°29′30″E		1060638	Upload Photo	Q26313792
Oasthouse About 40 Metres South of Nos 5 and 6 Little Mill Cottages	II	Underlynn Lane			23 March 1987	TQ7423245768; 51°11′05″N 0°29′30″E		1203330	Upload Photo	Q26498877
Target Farmhouse	II	Underlynn Lane			23 March 1987	TQ7438745904; 51°11′09″N 0°29′38″E		1203320	Upload Photo	Q26498866
Amber Cottage Fern Cottage	II	West End			23 March 1987	TQ7418544670; 51°10′29″N 0°29′26″E		1281741	Upload Photo	Q26570757
House Attached to Congregational Church the Limes the Limes the Manse and House Attached to Congregational Church the Manse	II	West End			23 May 1967	TQ7416644668; 51°10′29″N 0°29′25″E		1060640	Upload Photo	Q26313795
The Wentways	II	West End			23 March 1987	TQ7419944670; 51°10′29″N 0°29′26″E		1060639	Upload Photo	Q26313793
Westend Cottages	II	West End			23 March 1987	TQ7407844652; 51°10′29″N 0°29′20″E		1203365	Upload Photo	Q26498906
Westfield	II	West End			23 March 1987	TQ7409744655; 51°10′29″N 0°29′21″E		1060641	Upload Photo	Q26313796

== See also ==
- Grade I listed buildings in Kent
- Grade II* listed buildings in Kent

== Sources ==
- Newman, John (2012) [1969], Kent: West and the Weald, The Buildings of England, New Haven and London: Yale University Press, ISBN 978-0-300-18509-6
