= Listed buildings in Collier Street =

Historic structures in Kent, England

Collier Street is a village and civil parish in the Borough of Maidstone of Kent, England It contains one grade II* and 46 grade II listed buildings that are recorded in the National Heritage List for England.

This list is based on the information retrieved online from Historic England.

== Key ==
Grade	Criteria
I	Buildings that are of exceptional interest
II*	Particularly important buildings of more than special interest
II	Buildings that are of special interest

== Listing ==
Name	Grade	Location	Type	Completed (Note: The date given is the date used by Historic England as significant for the initial building or that of an important part in the structure's description.)	Date designated	Grid ref. (Note: The grid reference is based on the British national grid reference system, sometimes known as OSGB36, used by the Ordnance Survey.) Geo-coordinates	Notes	Entry number (Note: The "List Entry Number" is a unique number assigned to each listed building and scheduled monument by Historic England.)	Image	Wikidata
Barn About 10 Metres South of Bartons Farm Cottages	II				14 October 1987	TQ7164245597; 51°11′02″N 0°27′16″E		1069049	Upload Photo	Q26321739
Barn About 15 Metres South East of Martins Farmhouse	II				14 October 1987	TQ7163745265; 51°10′51″N 0°27′15″E		1344033	Upload Photo	Q26627787
Barn About 20 Metres South of Martins Farmhouse	II				14 October 1987	TQ7161845265; 51°10′51″N 0°27′14″E		1069051	Upload Photo	Q26321741
Barn About 60 Metres North of Nos 1 and 2 Moat Cottages	II				14 October 1987	TQ7160646294; 51°11′24″N 0°27′16″E		1344431	Upload Photo	Q26628155
Butchers Mere	II				14 October 1987	TQ7147046495; 51°11′31″N 0°27′09″E		1320590	Upload Photo	Q26606573
Chequer Tree Farmhouse	II	B2162			23 March 1987	TQ7168045321; 51°10′53″N 0°27′18″E		1060681	Upload Photo	Q26313849
Church of St Margaret	II				14 October 1987	TQ7170346035; 51°11′16″N 0°27′20″E		1069047	Church of St Margaret More images	Q26321737
Crow Plain Oast	II				8 February 2002	TQ7108847357; 51°11′59″N 0°26′51″E		1389710	Upload Photo	Q26669143
Eatons	II				14 October 1987	TQ7153546362; 51°11′27″N 0°27′12″E		1115130	Upload Photo	Q26408879
Martins Farmhouse	II				14 October 1987	TQ7161445284; 51°10′52″N 0°27′14″E		1069050	Upload Photo	Q26321740
Mockbeggar Farm House	II				14 October 1987	TQ7145746903; 51°11′44″N 0°27′09″E		1344070	Upload Photo	Q26627820
Saxonden	II				23 May 1967	TQ7165245813; 51°11′09″N 0°27′17″E		1069048	Upload Photo	Q26321738
The Duke of Wellington Inn	II				14 October 1987	TQ7162545426; 51°10′56″N 0°27′15″E		1344032	Upload Photo	Q26627786
The Nortons	II				14 October 1987	TQ7151946472; 51°11′30″N 0°27′11″E		1060632	Upload Photo	Q26313783
Barn About 15 Metres South West of Little Cheveney Farmhouse	II	Beech Road			23 March 1987	TQ7250143992; 51°10′09″N 0°27′58″E		1344414	Upload Photo	Q26628142
Great Sheephurst Farmhouse	II	Beech Road			23 March 1987	TQ7253643838; 51°10′04″N 0°27′59″E		1054823	Upload Photo	Q26306475
Little Cheveney Farm	II	Beech Road			23 March 1987	TQ7253443999; 51°10′09″N 0°27′59″E		1060676	Upload Photo	Q26313841
Oasthouse About 10 Metres North of Great Sheephurst Farmhouse	II	Beech Road			23 March 1987	TQ7253643864; 51°10′05″N 0°27′59″E		1060680	Upload Photo	Q26313847
Oasthouse About 15 Metres South East of Little Cheveney Farmhouse	II	Beech Road			23 March 1987	TQ7256343971; 51°10′08″N 0°28′01″E		1060677	Upload Photo	Q26313843
Oasthouse About 60 Metres North East of Little Cheveney Farmhouse	II	Beech Road			23 March 1987	TQ7260444065; 51°10′11″N 0°28′03″E		1344415	Upload Photo	Q26628143
Barn About 10 Metres North of Crowplain Farmhouse	II	Benover Road			11 November 1986	TQ7105547408; 51°12′01″N 0°26′49″E		1115122	Upload Photo	Q26408872
Crowplain Cottages	II	1 and 2, Benover Road			14 October 1987	TQ7100947553; 51°12′06″N 0°26′47″E		1115149	Upload Photo	Q26408896
Crowplain Farmhouse	II	Benover Road			14 October 1987	TQ7106447381; 51°12′00″N 0°26′50″E		1344429	Upload Photo	Q26628153
Forsters	II	Benover Road, Benover			14 October 1987	TQ7088948456; 51°12′35″N 0°26′42″E		1344425	Upload Photo	Q26628150
Forsters Cottage	II	Benover Road, Benover			14 October 1987	TQ7082348373; 51°12′32″N 0°26′39″E		1060623	Upload Photo	Q26313773
Mill House	II	Benover Road			14 October 1987	TQ7079048089; 51°12′23″N 0°26′37″E		1115580	Upload Photo	Q26409287
Rugmer Farmhouse	II	Benover Road			25 August 1977	TQ7115147960; 51°12′19″N 0°26′55″E		1115488	Upload Photo	Q26409212
Rugmer Hill Cottages	II	1 and 2, Benover Road			14 October 1987	TQ7119448100; 51°12′23″N 0°26′58″E		1060624	Upload Photo	Q26313774
Rugmer Hill Farmhouse	II*	Benover Road			23 May 1967	TQ7115048107; 51°12′24″N 0°26′55″E		1320370	Upload Photo	Q17545341
The Glass House	II	Benover Road			25 July 1952	TQ7055048262; 51°12′29″N 0°26′25″E		1060622	Upload Photo	Q26313771
Little Long End	II	Burton Lane, Claygate			27 January 1989	TQ7197344811; 51°10′36″N 0°27′32″E		1252931	Upload Photo	Q26544755
Barn About 30 Metres North North West of Wolsey Place	II	Claygate Road			14 October 1987	TQ7027747343; 51°12′00″N 0°26′09″E		1320587	Upload Photo	Q26606570
Mirembe	II	Claygate Road			14 October 1987	TQ7007547427; 51°12′03″N 0°25′59″E		1344430	Upload Photo	Q26628154
Pesthouse	II	Claygate Road			14 October 1987	TQ7040347163; 51°11′54″N 0°26′15″E		1060631	Upload Photo	Q26313781
Barn About 35 Metres South West of Den Farmhouse	II	Den Lane			14 October 1987	TQ7128547454; 51°12′02″N 0°27′01″E		1069052	Upload Photo	Q26321742
Den Cottages	II	1 and 2, Den Lane			14 October 1987	TQ7175547387; 51°12′00″N 0°27′25″E		1329915	Upload Photo	Q26615100
Barn About 80 Metres South of Brook Farmhouse	II	Green Lane			25 March 1986	TQ7290145347; 51°10′52″N 0°28′21″E		1060689	Upload Photo	Q26313861
Former Oasthouse About 30 Metres North West of Brook Farmhouse	II	Green Lane			14 October 1987	TQ7286045490; 51°10′57″N 0°28′19″E		1329941	Upload Photo	Q26615121
St Margarets House	II	Green Lane			14 October 1987	TQ7175246036; 51°11′16″N 0°27′23″E		1069054	Upload Photo	Q26321744
White Barn at Brook Farm	II	Green Lane			14 October 1987	TQ7284045405; 51°10′54″N 0°28′18″E		1344036	Upload Photo	Q26627790
Brandenbury House	II	Haviker Street			23 May 1967	TQ7201346516; 51°11′31″N 0°27′37″E		1145913	Upload Photo	Q26439067
Haviker Street Cottages	II	1 and 2, Haviker Street			14 October 1987	TQ7208546240; 51°11′22″N 0°27′40″E		1329710	Upload Photo	Q26614949
Little Spitzbrook Farm Cottage	II	4, Haviker Street			14 October 1987	TQ7204946298; 51°11′24″N 0°27′38″E		1069055	Upload Photo	Q26321745
Longends Farmhouse	II	Long Ends Lane			23 March 1987	TQ7245845043; 51°10′43″N 0°27′57″E		1025864	Upload Photo	Q26276795
Barn About 15 Metres North West of Gainhill Cottages	II	Spenny Lane			14 October 1987	TQ7084746638; 51°11′36″N 0°26′37″E		1100311	Upload Photo	Q26392417
Gainhill Cottages	II	1 and 2, Spenny Lane			14 October 1987	TQ7086546626; 51°11′36″N 0°26′38″E		1344054	Upload Photo	Q26627805
Horns Lodge Cottages	II	1 and 2, Spenny Lane			14 October 1987	TQ7064146986; 51°11′48″N 0°26′27″E		1069012	Upload Photo	Q26321701

== See also ==
- Grade I listed buildings in Kent
- Grade II* listed buildings in Kent

== Sources ==
- Newman, John (2012) [1969], Kent: West and the Weald, The Buildings of England, New Haven and London: Yale University Press, ISBN 978-0-300-18509-6
