= St Peter's and St Paul's Church, Yalding =

Coordinates: 51.224546°N 0.430969°E

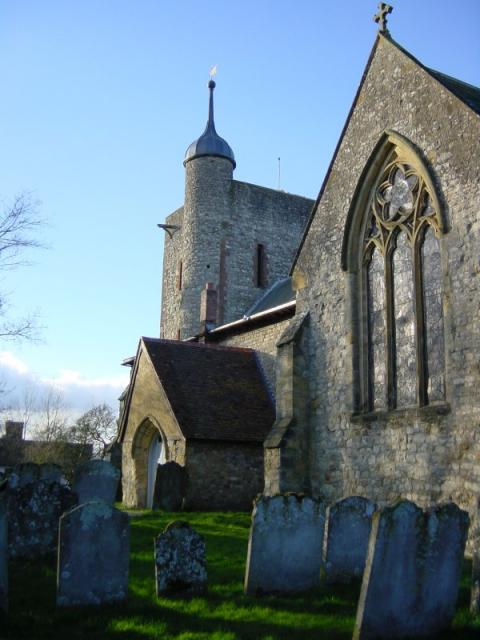
- The tower, south porch and south transept

- Location within Kent
- OS grid reference: TQ 69846 50069
- Location: Yalding, Kent
- Country: England
- Denomination: Church of England
- Churchmanship: Open Evangelical

History
- Status: Parish church

Architecture
- Functional status: Active
- Heritage designation: Grade I
- Designated: 23 May 1967

Administration
- Province: Canterbury
- Diocese: Rochester
- Archdeaconry: Tonbridge
- Deanery: Paddock Wood

St Peter's and St Paul's Church is a parish church in Yalding, Kent, dedicated to saints Peter and Paul. It was begun in the 13th century and is a Grade I listed building.

== Building ==
The church was begun in the 13th century with further work carried out in the early 14th century and the 15th century. The church was restored in the 19th and 20th centuries. It is arranged on a cruciform plan, built mostly of uncoursed ragstone and sandstone, with render to the chancel and part of the nave. The nave, chancel and tower are the oldest parts of the church, built in the 13th century. The north and south transepts and the north and south aisles are early 14th century. The north and south porches are later 14th century. The roofs are variously plain tiled, slated or leaded. It is a Grade I listed building.

The tower has a variety of small lancet windows at various levels on its three outward-facing sides; those in the belfry being doubled. The plain parapet is of galleted stone. A taller stair turret with a moulded cornice and a leaded onion dome is attached to the south-east corner of the tower and is topped by a weathervane dated 1734.

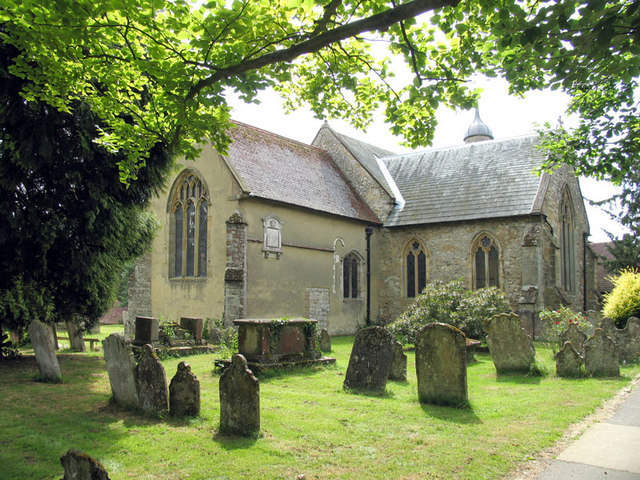
The chancel and north transept

The north façade of the north aisle may have 13th-century elements. The construction of the wall is different each side of the porch and may indicate that it having been refaced in the 15th century or later. The chamfered plinth is lower on the west side and the east side has a string course which does not feature on the west side. Each side of the porch is a 15th-century three-lighted cinquefoil-headed and traceried window. The west end of the aisle continues past the foot of the tower. The west end of the aisle's north wall and the gabled west end contain a two-lighted trefoil-headed window. The north porch contains a panelled double door to the outer doorway with a leaded fanlight above. The north transept is gabled with the eaves lower than those on the north aisle and diagonal buttresses on the external corners. The north wall contains a three-lighted window with cinquefoiled heads. The east wall contains two two-lighted windows and a blocked doorway to the rood loft stairs.

The south aisle is also thought to have been refaced. The plinth and string course are both chamfered. Each side of the porch has a 15th-century three-lighted pointed arch window. The west end contains a 14th-century two-lighted trefoil-headed. The south porch is plinthless with the gable pebbledashed. The outer doorway is contained in a pointed arch. The eaves windows and buttressing of the south transept are similar to those on the north transept.

The chancel has diagonal buttresses on the north-east and south-east corners. The south wall contains a 15th-century two-lighted window with cinquefoil-heads and two pointed lancet windows, with a doorway under the westernmost one. The north wall has a string course and a single 15th-century two-lighted window with cinquefoil-heads at the west end that partly cuts through an earlier blocked lancet window. The pointed arch east window is traceried with three-lights.

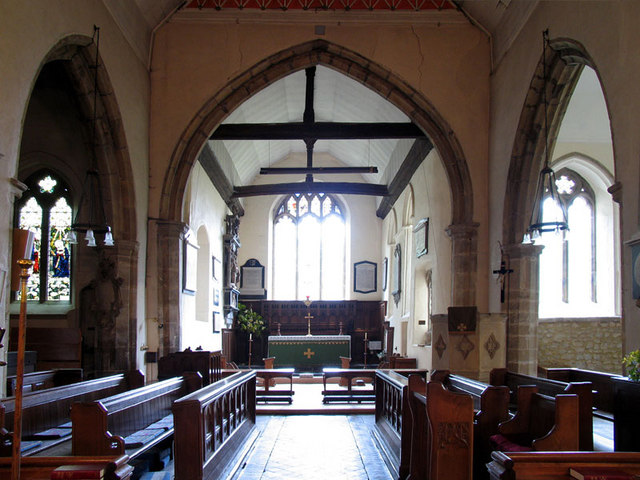
Looking east from the nave towards the chancel with the transepts visible through the arcades on each side

Internally, the aisles are divided from the nave with four-bay arcades of hollow chamfered pointed arches on octagonal columns with moulded capitals and bases. The arches between the nave and the transepts and the nave and the chancel are similar to those of the arcades except with the columns being semi-octagonal and attached to the walls. The arches between the tower and the nave and the tower and the west end of the north aisle are plainly chamfered on semi-circular attached columns. Arches between the aisles and the transepts are like those of the arcades, but spring from the walls without supporting columns. The nave and transept roofs are canted and boarded with decorative bosses in the nave. The lean-to roofs of the aisles contain chamfered rafters, purlins and cornices. The roof of the chancel contains octagonal crown post trusses.

The church contains memorials to Ambrose Warde (d. 1637), John Ousnam (d. 1703), Robert and Matha Kenward (d. 1720 and 1761), Richard Ward (d. 178(1)?), Jane Akers (d. 1804), Aretas Akers (d. 1816) and William Aretas Akers (d. 1862). A window in the south wall of the chancel is dedicated to Edmund Blunden.

The churchyard contains a number of Grade II listed chest tombs from the 17th to 19th centuries.,

== See also ==
- Grade I listed buildings in Maidstone
