= Laddingford =

Hamlet in Kent, England

Coordinates: 51.2079°N 0.4185°E

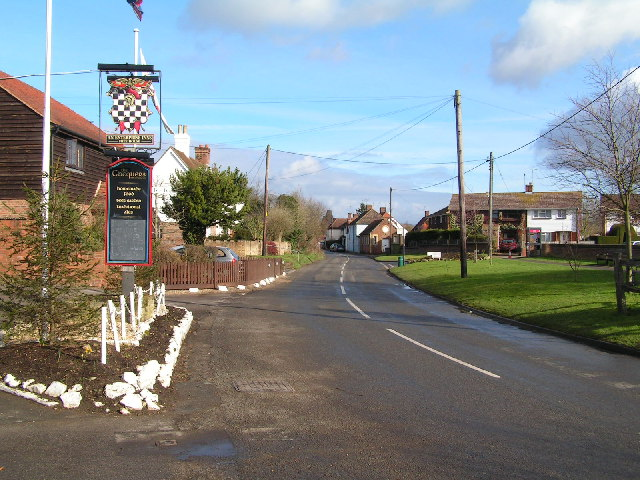

- Location within Kent
- Civil parish: Yalding
- District: Maidstone
- Shire county: Kent
- Region: South East
- Country: England
- Sovereign state: United Kingdom
- Post town: Maidstone
- Postcode district: ME18
- Police: Kent
- Fire: Kent
- Ambulance: South East Coast
- UK Parliament: Weald of Kent

Laddingford is a hamlet in the parish of Yalding in Kent, England. Laddingford Aerodrome is located nearby.
