= River Beult =

River in Kent, England

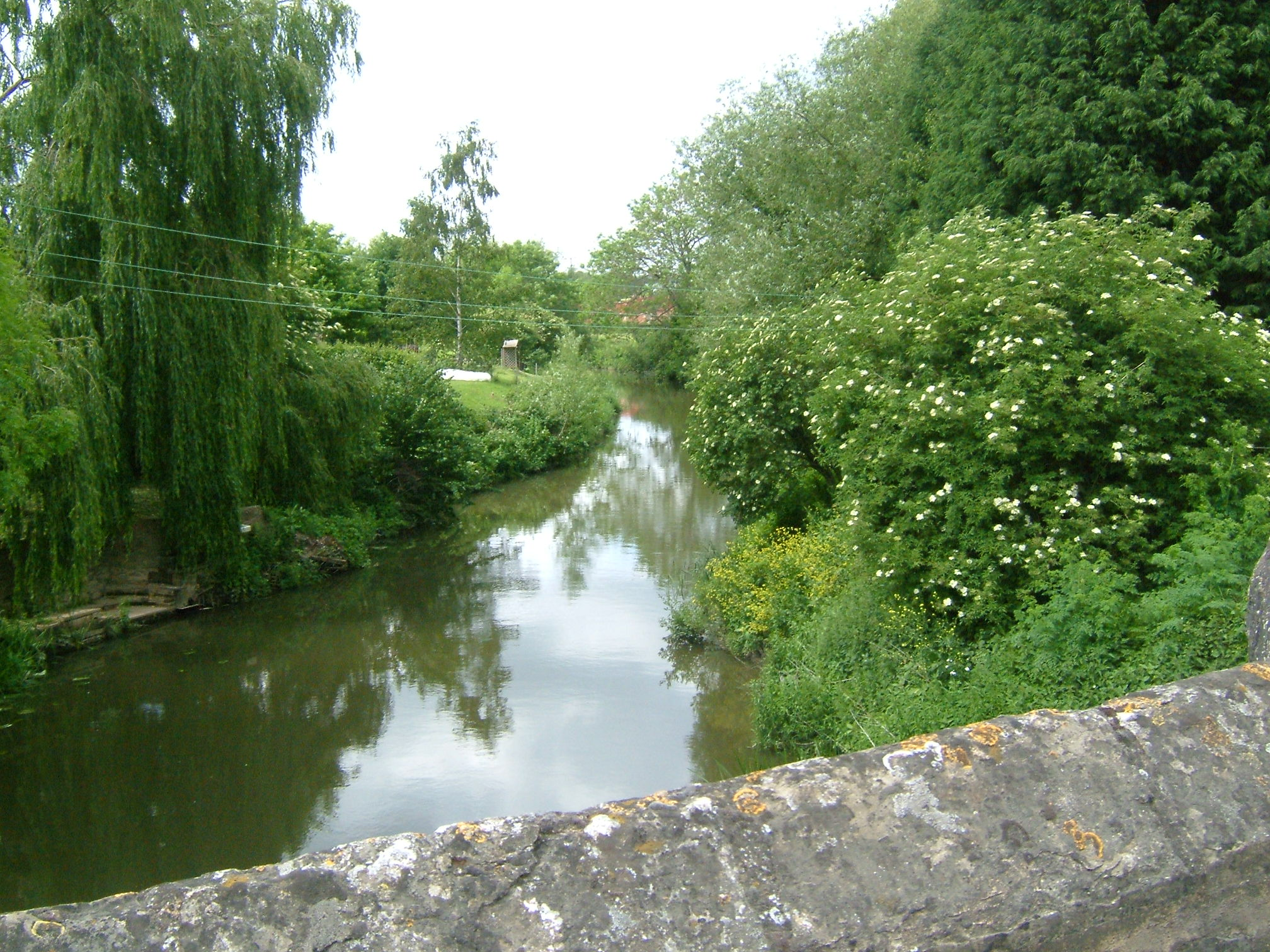
- River Beult at Yalding

- Rivers of Kent

Physical characteristics
- Source
  - location: several sources west of Ashford; TQ 980 390
  - coordinates: 51°06′57″N 0°49′48″E
- Mouth
  - location: River Medway at Yalding; TQ 693 503
  - coordinates: 51°13′36″N 0°25′32″E

The River Beult (/ˈbɛlt/ BELT) is a tributary of the River Medway in South East England.

== Course ==
The Beult has several sources west of Ashford, including one at Woodchurch. It then flows through Headcorn. At Hunton, 7 furlongs (1.4 km) above Yalding, it is joined by the major stream of the River Teise. Town bridge lies 10 1/4 miles (16.5 km) from Allington, it is the longest mediaeval bridge in Kent. The river enters the Medway at Yalding. The River Beult is crossed by the railway between Headcorn and Staplehurst. The bridge was the scene of the Staplehurst rail crash in 1865 in which Charles Dickens was involved.

The Beult was subject to a Land Drainage Improvement Scheme in the 1930s. This led to the river being widened, deepened and straightened from Smarden to Yalding. Despite this action the river is designated as a Site of Special Scientific Interest. It is one of the few clay rivers in England and Wales to retain much of its characteristic flora. It hasn't been heavily embanked like most clay rivers found in the midlands, although the majority of trees were removed. The lack of shade coupled with retained areas of grazing means there are many wildlife-rich margins to the river, with nearly 100 different species of aquatic and marginal plants recorded.

The river is subject to significant agricultural run off and flows from wastewater treatment works. Hence despite recent improvements, it still suffers water quality problems. At one time, the river had been noteworthy for its cleanliness, with waters being "crystal clear" as one account put it. However, due to the aforementioned industries, the water quality had taken a heavy toll on the previous pristine description.

Upstream of Smarden, the river retains its natural meandering morphology, although it is still subject to water level management (raising water levels in the summer, and dropping them in the winter). The vegetation communities are not so interesting here as the river is smaller, heavily tree lined and a greater proportion of riverside land is in arable cultivation.

== Water quality ==
The Environment Agency measure water quality of the river systems in England. Each is given an overall ecological status, which may be one of five levels: high, good, moderate, poor and bad. There are several components that are used to determine this, including biological status, which looks at the quantity and varieties of invertebrates, angiosperms and fish. Chemical status, which compares the concentrations of various chemicals against known safe concentrations, is rated good or fail.

Water quality of the River Beult in 2016:

Section	Ecological Status	Chemical Status	Overall Status	Length	Catchment	Channel
Beult at Yalding	Moderate	Good	Moderate	4.566 km (2.837 mi)	7.632 km^{2} (2.947 sq mi)	Heavily modified
Beult	Moderate	Good	Moderate	25.751 km (16.001 mi)	75.137 km^{2} (29.011 sq mi)	Heavily modified
Upper Beult	Poor	Good	Poor	5.52 km (3.43 mi)	36.317 km^{2} (14.022 sq mi)	

== Site of Special Scientific Interest ==
River Beult
- Site of Special Scientific Interest
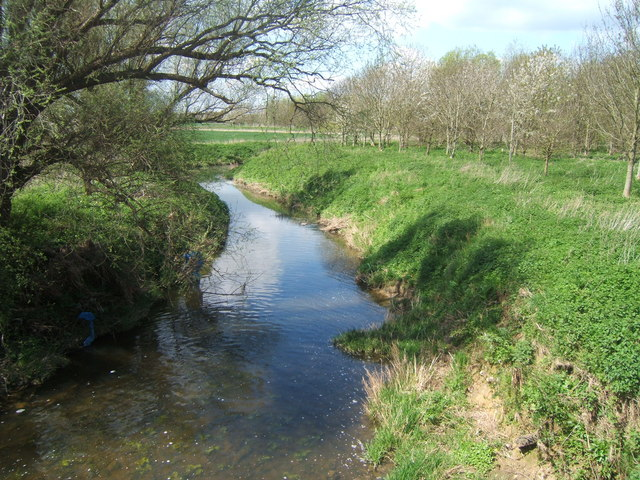
- Location of River Beult.
- Area of search: Kent
- Grid reference: TQ 766 468
- Interest: Biological
- Area: 29.1 hectares (72 acres)
- Notification date: 1994
- Location map: Magic Map

River Beult between Hadman's Bridge, west of Smarden, and the junction with the River Medway is a 29.1-hectare (72-acre) biological Site of Special Scientific Interest.

The river has a varied clay river flora, with nearly 100 recorded species. There are floating plants such as yellow water-lily in the channel and flora on the banks include amphibious bistort and celery-leaved buttercup.

== Watermills ==
The River Beult and its tributaries powered a number of watermills. From source to mouth these were:-

=== Cheveney Mill, Hunton ===
TQ 708 496 51°13′12″N 0°26′48″E This was a corn mill, latterly converted to generate electricity c.1900. The waterwheel was replaced by a turbine made by Messrs Drake & Fletcher of Maidstone. During the Second World War, Italian Prisoners of War were billeted in the mill building. The building survives today, converted into a house.

=== Yalding mill ===
A Domesday site, the mill was still in existence in 1336.

== Watermills on the tributaries ==
The River Beult is unusual in that the majority of its watermills were not on the main river itself, but on the tributaries.

=== Angley Brook ===
A stream rises at Angley Woods, Cranbrook and flows into the Beult at Frittenden. It powered these mills:-

==== Pin Pond Mill, Cranbrook ====
This may have been a fulling mill.

==== Spratsbourne Mill, Cranbrook ====
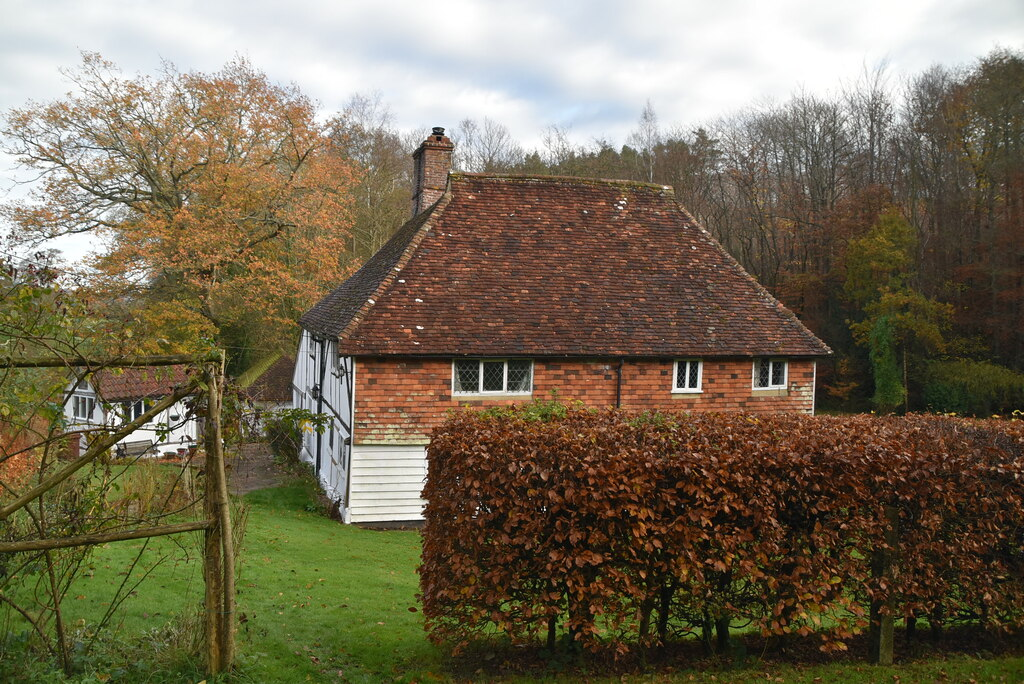
Spratsbourne Mill

The miller here was Edmund Luckhurst in 1656 and 1660.

==== Dog Kennel Mill, Cranbrook ====
An old fulling mill site.

==== Friezley Mill, Cranbrook ====
TQ 771 384 approx 51°07′03″N 0°31′53″E

An old fulling mill site.

==== Hockeredge Mill, Cranbrook ====
TQ 775 387 51°07′12″N 0°32′14″E

This mill was sold to Alexander Courthope in 1523, and his son sold it to Robert Hovenden in 1551. It remained in the Hovenden family for many years, until at least 1704. The mill later passed to the Bonnick family.

==== Hartridge (Hartridge Manor) Mill, Cranbrook ====
TQ 774 395 51°07′38″N 0°32′10″E

This was a corn mill. In the mid nineteenth century it was worked in conjunction with the Union Mill, the miller being Mr Russell. The mill building was standing in 1974, devoid of machinery. It probably had a breast shot waterwheel.

==== Paley (Hawkridge) Mill, Cranbrook ====
TQ 777 400 51°07′54″N 0°32′27″E

The mill building was standing in April 1974, devoid of machinery.

==== Lovehurst Mill, Staplehurst ====
This was a corn mill. John Foreman, farmer, of Horsmonden hired the mill for 14 years in November 1854.

==== Maplehurst Mill, Frittenden ====
TQ 803 416 51°08′42″N 0°34′43″E

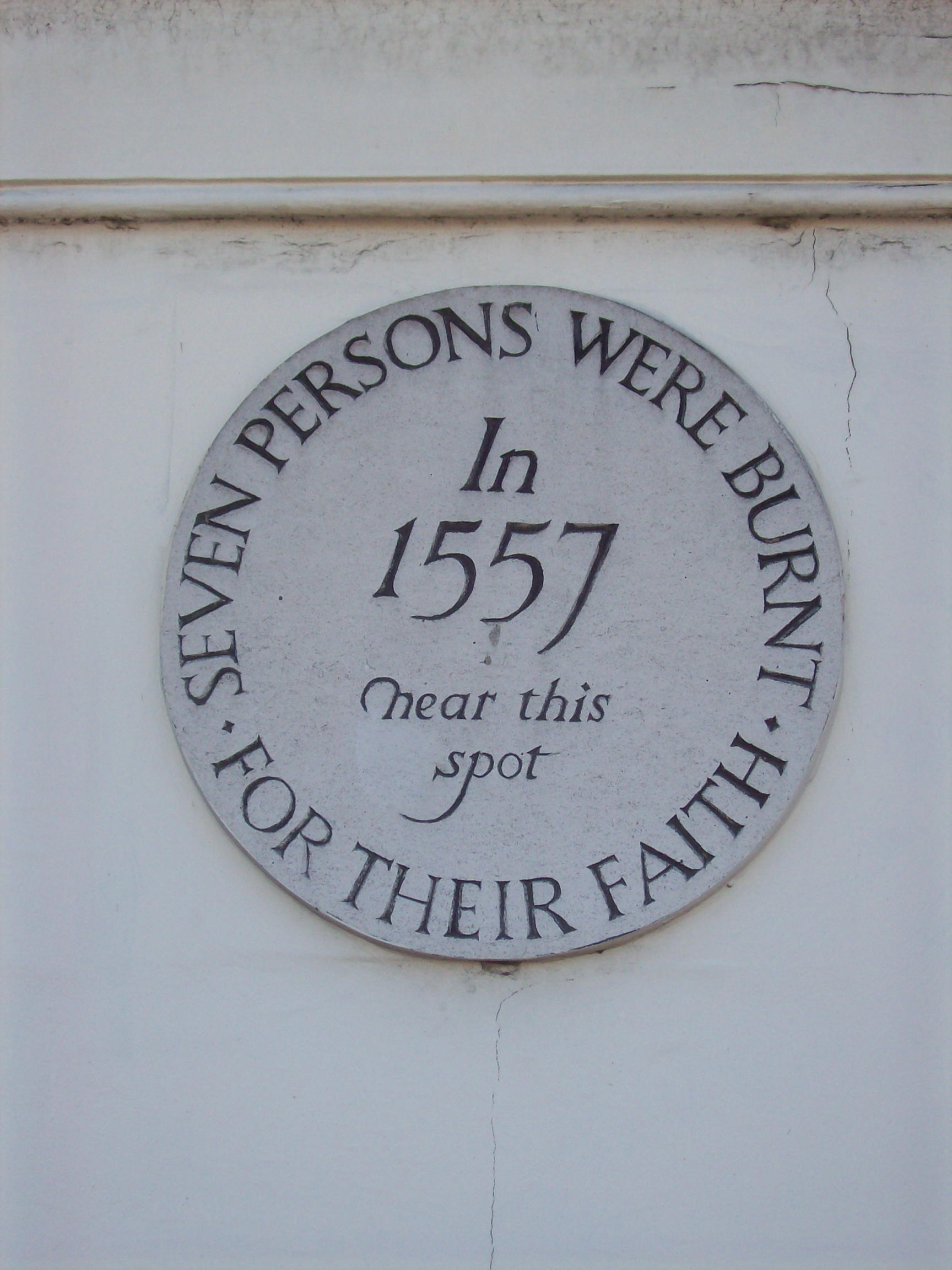
The plaque to the martyrs

This is an old, established corn mill site. The mill survives and retains most of its machinery. It has a cast-iron overshot wheel driving three pairs of millstones. On 18 June 1557 the miller, William Allin and his wife Katherine were burned at the stake at Fairmeadow, Maidstone, along with five other Protestants. The Allins had fed the poor, sold corn at half price and read scriptures to people.

The earliest surviving part of the mill is dated 1756, David Papillon being the then owner. The mill was extended c. 1890, when a steam engine was installed. The original mill building having a peg tile roof with the extension being roofed in slate. The cast-iron waterwheel is 10 feet (3.05 m) diameter and 8 feet (2.44 m) wide, mounted on a wooden axle, driving a cast-iron pit wheel with 92 wooden cogs. The cast-iron wallower has 32 teeth and is carried on a wooden upright shaft, driving a cast-iron Great Spur Wheel with 120 cogs. This drove three pairs of millstones. The stones are two pairs of 48-inch-diameter (1.22 m) Peak stones and one pair of 44-inch-diameter (1.12 m) French Burr stones by Hughes of Dover & London. The Crown Wheel is cast iron, with 18 teeth, it drove a total four layshafts which drove several machines, including a smutter and a Feltons Patent American Grist Mill.

The mill stands on the parish boundary of Frittenden and Staplehurst, with the majority of the mill in the former parish. It was working until the winter of 1947–8, when the machinery was damaged through being iced up.

=== Tributary of the Angley Brook ===
A tributary of the above stream flows into the pond of Hartridge mill. It powered a mill downstream of Mad Dog Shaw.

=== Hammer Stream ===
The Hammer Stream powered watermills at:-

==== Hammer Mill, Biddenden ====
This was the most easterly iron furnace in the Weald. In the time of Queen Elizabeth I it was in the ownership of Sir Richard Butler. The mill was replaced by a corn mill in the mid-seventeenth century. The Hammer Pond formerly extended to 30 acres (120,000 m^{2}).

==== Hammer Mill (corn), Biddenden ====
TQ820 383 51°06′54″N 0°36′05″E

This corn mill stands some 200 yards (180 m) south-west of the site of the furnace. The brick mill building is three storeys high, with a slate roof. The overshot waterwheel was 12 feet (3.66 m) diameter and 6 feet (1.83 m) wide, mounted on an 8 1/4 inches (210 mm) square cast iron axle. It drove a cast-iron pit wheel with 88 wooden cogs. This drove a cast-iron wallower with 28 teeth mounted on a wooden upright shaft. The cast-iron Great Spur Wheel has 128 cogs and drove four pairs of millstone at one time. The three surviving pairs of stones are two pairs of French Burrs and one pair of Peak stones. The Compass-arm Crown Wheel is of all-wood construction, and has 48 cogs. It drove a layshaft and the sack hoist. The mill last worked for trade in 1928, a Mr Hall being the last miller.

==== Bettenham Mill ====
The site of this mill was marked by Mill Field and Millpond Field on the 1840 tithe map.

=== Tributary of the Hammer Stream ===
A stream rises at Sissinghurst and flows into the Hammer Stream downstream of Hammer Mill, Biddenden. it runs for 7 miles (11 km) passing through Sissinghurst and Frittenden and then joins the River Beult at Headcorn. There are many footpaths crossing it and many beautiful walks typical of the Kentish countryside. It powered a watermill:-

==== New Mill, Sissinghurst ====
TQ 802 381 51°06′49″N 0°34′32″E This mill was mentioned in rate books of 1687 and 1689.

=== Crane Brook ===
The Crane Brook rises at Hartley, it powered a number of mills before joining the Hammer Stream at Biddenden.

==== Upper Mill, Cranbrook ====
This mill stood in the area now known as "The Bottoms". The Upper Pond is mentioned in 1503, and in 1545 Thomas Roberts granted a lease to Thomas Burgess of Cranbrooke of the "uppermost mmyll ponde" - information given in the lease suggests that the Upper Mill was a fulling mill then.

==== Anthony's Mill, Cranbrook ====
This mill was mentioned in 1416 and again in 1447, its location being in Mellane (Mill Lane). In 1464 a rental entry mentions "Anthony's Mill Pond.

==== Fulling mill, Cranbrook ====
This was located near the present day Moat Farm. The mill pond would have been some 10 acres (40,000 m^{2}) in area. It was most likely a fulling mill.

==== Sissinghurst Mill ====
The site of this mill is occupied by the present day Lake Chad. In the early 17th century the millers were Francis Chittenden (1634) followed by John Chittenden (1654–69). The mill was a corn mill.

==== Karckeregge Mill ====
The first mention of this mill was in 1353 when the mill was leased. John Bettenham was the lessee in 1416, being the son of Stephen Bettenham. The mill was leased to Peter Courtnope in 1451 and again in 1472, by then probably a fulling mill. The land the mill stood on now forms part of Plumers Farm.

==== Branden Mill ====
A long lost mill site, probably a fulling mill.

=== Tributary of the Crane Brook ===
A tributary of the Crane Brook rises at Swattenden, it powered five mills, including those at:-

==== The Freight, Cranbrook ====
A fulling mill.

==== Baker's Cross, Cranbrook ====
This fulling mill at Baker's Cross was first mentioned in 1500 as "Hancock's Mill". It may have been a fulling mill or a corn mill then. In 1516 it had been replaced by "Thomas Sheffe's new fulling mill". The mill seems to have ceased working by 1604, when a dyehouse was in use at the site.

=== Further tributary of the Crane Brook ===
A tributary of the Crane Brook flows through the town. It powered:-

==== Hatmill, Cranbrook ====
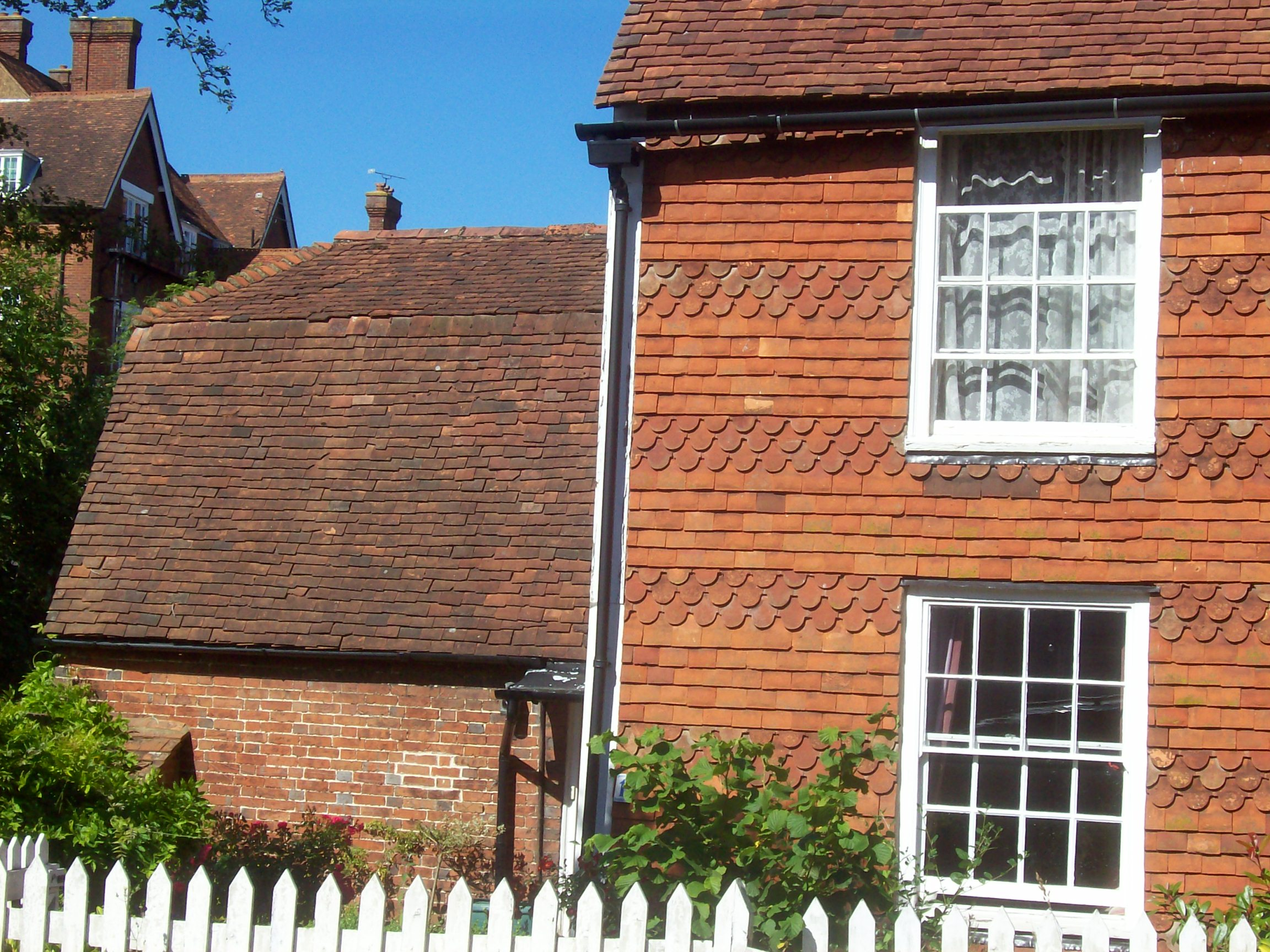
Hatmill

John Tooth bought a house in Stone Street, Cranbrook in the late eighteenth century. he built a small factory at the back of this house in which he made hats. It was powered by a small waterwheel. The building survives today as a private house.

=== Stream at Ulcombe ===
A stream rises at Ulcombe and flows into the beult at Hawkenbury. It powered a watermill.

==== Upper Mill, Ulcombe ====
This was probably the Domesday mill recorded at Ulcombe. Chegworth mill was also known as Lower Mill thus this mill would be the Upper Mill.

=== Stream at Chart Sutton ===
A stream rises at Chart Sutton and flows into the Beult at Cross At Hand. It powered a watermill.

==== Chart Mill, Chart Sutton ====
TQ 794 493 51°12′53″N 0°34′11″E

This mill is a timber framed mill on a single storey brick base. The waterwheel was some 24 feet (7.32 m) diameter and 4 feet (1.22 m) wide, it was removed during World War Two. The cast iron axle is 9 inches (230 mm) square, and bears the legend "WEEKS & SON, MAIDSTONE 1875" on one face. No other machinery is known to exist in the mill, the lower floor having been filled with concrete when the mill was converted, the upper floors being used as an office.

== See also ==
- Medway watermills
