= Marden, Kent =

Village in Kent, England

Coordinates: 51.174°N 0.494°E

Marden
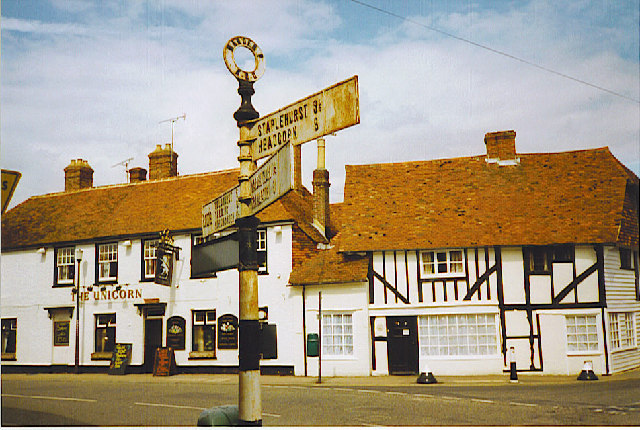

- Location within Kent
- Population: 3,724 (2011)
- OS grid reference: TQ744446
- District: Maidstone
- Shire county: Kent
- Region: South East
- Country: England
- Sovereign state: United Kingdom
- Post town: Tonbridge
- Postcode district: TN12
- Dialling code: 01622
- Police: Kent
- Fire: Kent
- Ambulance: South East Coast
- UK Parliament: Weald of Kent

Marden (/ˈmɑːrdən/ or /mɑːrˈdɛn/) is a village and civil parish in the Kent borough of Maidstone approximately 8 miles (13 km) south of Maidstone. The civil parish is located on the flood plain of the River Beult, and also includes Chainhurst and the hamlet of Wanshurst Green.

The village is associated with apple growing and from 1933 to 1991 hosted a nationally recognised fruit show.

== History ==
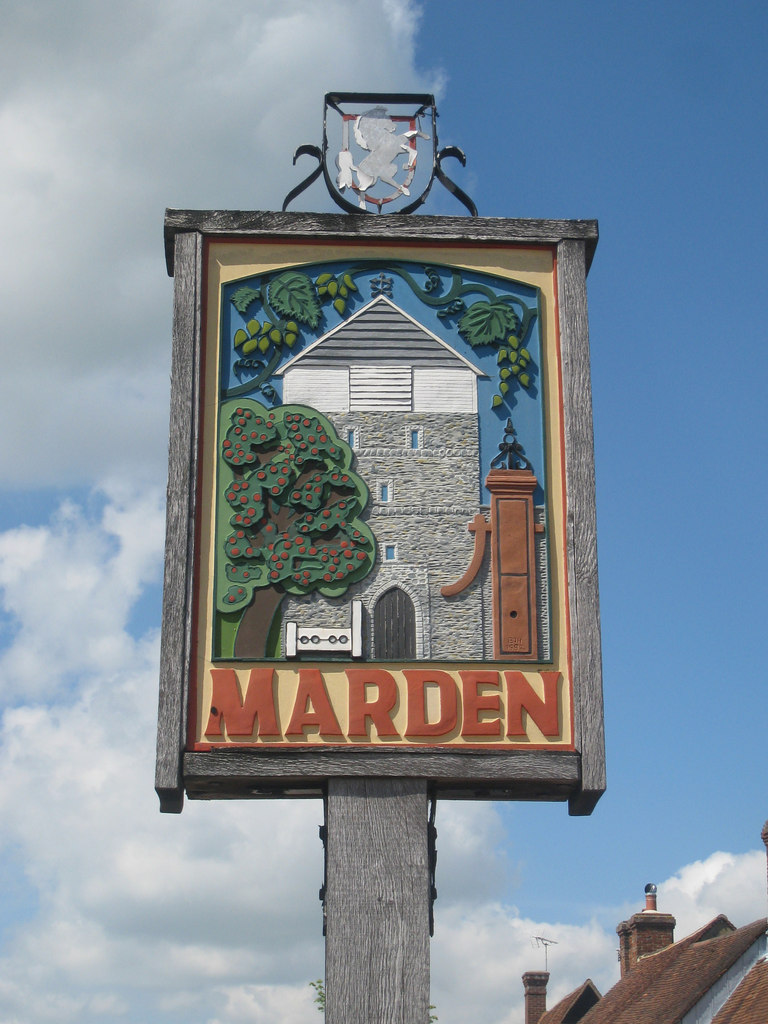
Village sign

=== Name ===
The dense woodland and marshes of the Weald of Kent were littered with acorns and beech mast in autumn making ideal seasonal foraging ground for pigs. The grants by Saxon kings for rights to these pannage areas were known as dens which later came to refer to the herders' camps and ultimately the settlements that grew up there. Maer referred to barren areas of marsh alongside the forest. In time the dens developed into permanent settlements such a Maer den, or clearing beside the marsh.

By 1066 the settlement was recorded as Maere Denn; in 1170, Maeredaen; 1235, Mereden; 1283, Merdenne, and from about 1635 by its present name.

=== Parish pump ===
Marden Parish Council covered over a well opposite the village's Maidstone Road junction in 1899 and erected a pump. In 1907, it had to be locked, and then removed, because of contamination of the water by ammonia, nitrates, chlorides and organic matter. The parish pump is depicted on the village sign.

=== Forges ===
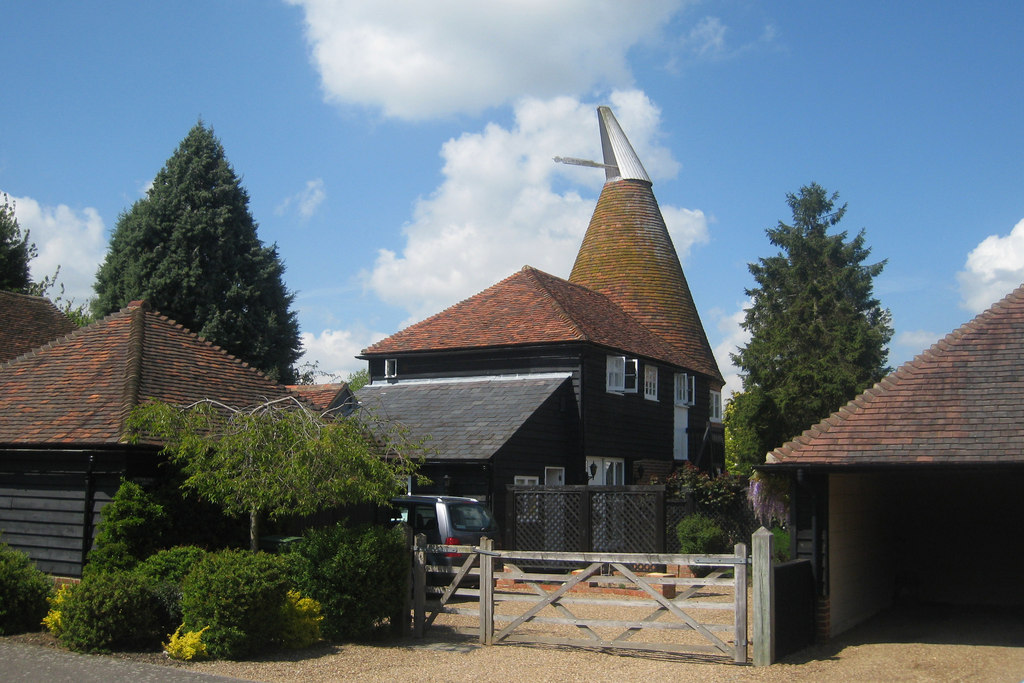
Sutton Forge

George Rootes, a relative of the Rootes Group founders, operated Rootes' Forge at West End, and the West End Tavern next door.

A Mr Bourne ran Bourne's Forge in the High Street. After it was demolished, Sutton's shop was built on the site and later new housing, the present Sutton Forge.

=== French airliner crash ===
On 10 February 1930, a Farman F.63 Goliath crashed at Pagehurst emergency landing ground whilst attempting an emergency landing following structural failure of the starboard tailplane. Two of the six people on board were killed.

=== Marden Fruit Show ===
In 1933, Marden Fruit Show Society was established by 35 top-fruit growers and their first show was held in October that year at Walton Hall on Pattenden Lane. The prize fruit was sent to London for display at Selfridges. Apart from World War II, and bad frost years, the Society has organised their shows annually ever since.

In 1953 Queen Elizabeth The Queen Mother attended the show.

Marden Fruit Show is now The National Fruit Show and has moved from Pattenden Lane to the Kent Showground at nearby Detling. Entries of apples, pears and cherries come from across Great Britain and mainland Europe.

=== Doodlebugs ===
On 3 July 1944, a German V-1 flying bomb shot down by anti-aircraft fire landed on an army camp in Pattenden Lane, killing 11 and injuring eight. A total of 11 of the flying bombs fell on Marden including another on Pattenden Lane that exploded in a pond.

=== Pluto ===
A World War II Pluto fuel pipeline was constructed through Marden parish. In 2016, a section of the pipe from Gatehouse Farm, incorporating a concrete joint to facilitate a change in alignment, was relocated and put on permanent display at Marden Library.

=== Rail collision ===
On 4 January 1969, a passenger train from Charing Cross to Ramsgate overran a signal at danger in fog and crashed into the back of a parcels train. Four people were killed and 11 injured.

== Transport ==
Marden is 8 miles (13 km) from Maidstone and 14 miles (22 km) from Tonbridge. It is on the B2079 linking the A229 Maidstone with the A21 at Flimwell. Marden railway station is on the South Eastern Main Line.

== Economy ==
There is local employment at the substantial industrial estate built north of the railway line on Pattenden Lane from 1950 which supplements traditional agricultural jobs, but many residents commute to work in London.

In 1993, there was a substantial tyre dump fire at the Pattenden Lane industrial area that caused pollution of the River Teise.

== Amenities ==
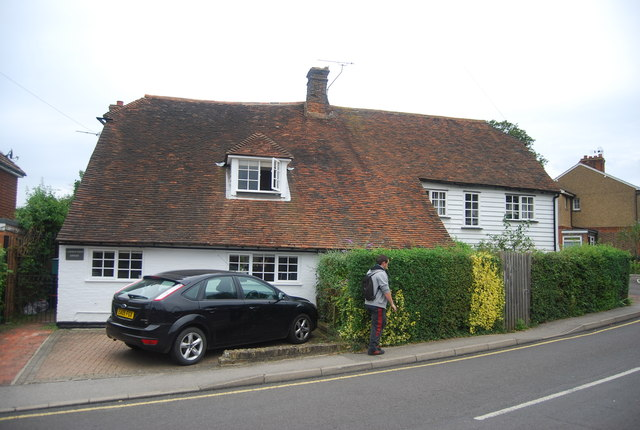
A house on Pattenden Lane

St Michael and All Angels Church, depicted on the village sign, was built at the end of the 12th century.

In 2007, Ann Widdecombe opened the Marden Heritage Centre's archive at Marden Library.

The village school, Marden Primary Academy, joined the Leigh Academies Trust in 2020.

Marden Village Club was founded in 1907 and offers refreshments, singers and bingo to its members. Across Howland Road from the Village Club is the entrance to Marden Bowls Club's green and clubhouse.

=== Memorial Hall ===
Marden Memorial Hall on Goudhurst Road is operated by a registered charity. The three function rooms host community and private events, and since 1974 have staged Marden Theatre Group productions.

The Hall was converted from a former Church School in 1934 and named for the memory of Mr Edward Day.

Between 1950 and 1977 the Memorial Hall accommodated Marden library.

=== Sport ===
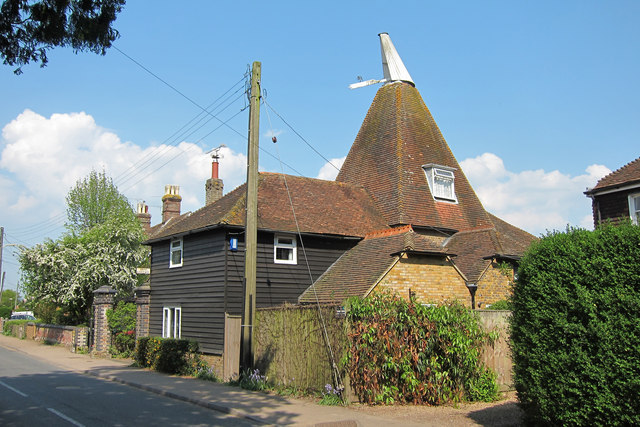
Oast Cottage, Marden

Marden Cricket Club and Marden Russets Hockey Club are based at Day's Sport Field.

Marden Minors football team play at Church Park.

=== Marden Meadows ===
The 8.8 acres (3.6 ha) Marden Meadows Site of Special Scientific Interest is to the east of the village. Kent Trust for Nature Conservation mows the three fields once a year for hay and livestock graze the aftermath. The unimproved, natural grassland contains Ophioglossum, green winged orchid, Saxifraga granulata, Leucanthemum vulgare, Rhinanthus minor, and within a pond Hottonia palustris and bladder-sedge.

== People ==
- Nicholas Amhurst (1697–1742), poet
- Nicholas Fenn (1936–2016), British diplomat
- William Hartnell (1908–75), actor
- Sidney Highwood (1896–1975 ), RAF officer
- William Morley Punshon (1824–81), preacher
- Franz Von Werra, (1914–41), German fighter pilot

== See also ==
- Listed buildings in Marden, Kent
