= St. George's Episcopal Memorial Church =

Historic church in North Dakota, United States

- U.S. National Register of Historic Places
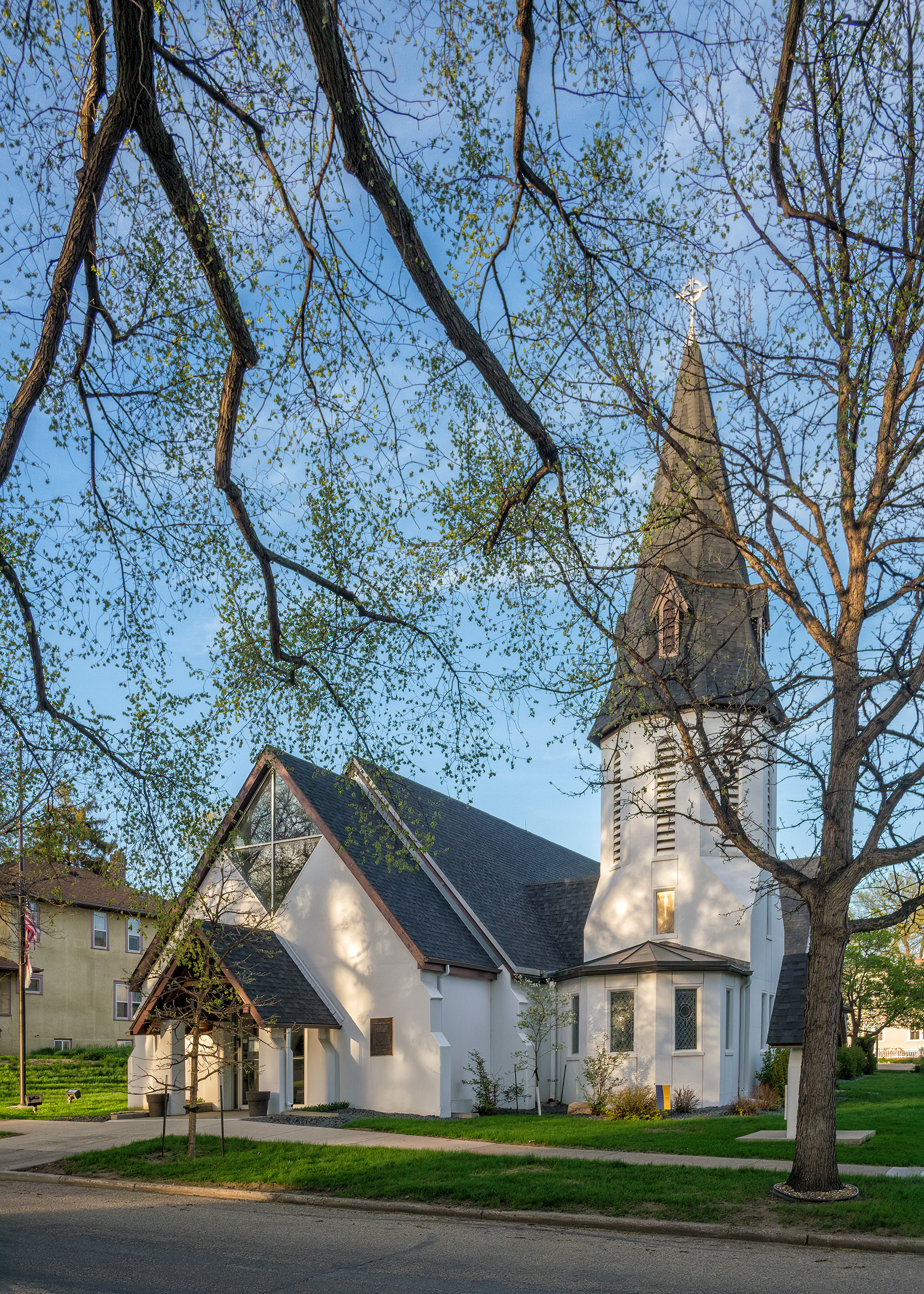

- Location within North Dakota Location within the United States
- Location: 601 North 4th St., Bismarck, North Dakota
- Coordinates: 46.8109°N 100.7855°W
- Built: 1880-1881; 1948-1949
- Built by: John Hoagland (1880-81 church)
- Architect: Herman M. Leonhard
- Architectural style: Gothic Revival
- Website: stgeorges-bismarck.org
- MPS: Episcopal Churches of North Dakota MPS
- NRHP reference No.: 100007065
- Added to NRHP: October 5, 2021

St. George's Episcopal Memorial Church, a historic Episcopal church in Bismarck, North Dakota's capital, is unique for its construction incorporating stained glass from English churches bombed in World War II into its own stained-glass windows. It is located in the Episcopal Diocese of North Dakota and was added to the National Register of Historic Places in 2021. The building, completed in 1949, replaced an early one dating to 1881 in the Dakota Territory, prior to statehood in 1889. The original building was built on railroad-donated land in the first decade of the city's growth. The church needed more space by the 1930s but was unable to erect a larger building until after World War II. The original building was moved and repurposed as a museum at Camp Hancock State Historic Site. The newer building is notable for being constructed of pumice concrete and its unique stained-glass windows. The windows were made in England by Barton, Kinder and Alderson, and the majority of them contained pieces of glass that were salvaged from dozens of damaged churches in southeast England during World War II. The glass studio documented the lineage of each window, with some made with glass collected from churches built in the Middle Ages.

== Early history and first building ==
The church traces its origin to 1873 and had its first resident missionary in 1878, who held services in the town schoolhouse. In 1879, the congregation, then called the Church of the Bread of Life, first sought to construct its own building, and the Northern Pacific railroad was solicited for a donation of land. The railroad gave the church six lots, then considered by some to be too far from town. It was built by John Hoagland for $2,400 from 1879 to 1880. It was based on a design by British architect Henry G. Harrison, who designed the Trinity Cathedral in Omaha, Nebraska, at the same time. Details were provided by local architect A. E. Hussey, who was working in a Mandan lumberyard. The building was mixed Stick style and Gothic Revival, later characterized as lacking in "ecclesiologically correct features". Components including windows, doors, Gothic roof brackets, and interior woodwork were made by "the father of John A. Larson". The church was consecrated in 1881, with the first baptismal service held on June 16 of that year and the first marriage in August.

In 1882, the bell from the steamship Red Cloud, named after Oglala Lakota (a native American tribe) leader Red Cloud was donated and installed in its belfry. The bell had been a donation to the ship in honor of Red Cloud, and was re-donated to the church after being salvaged from the bottom of the upper Missouri River after the ship burned and sank.

The interior was updated in 1887:

North Dakota Episcopalians were aware of the liturgical importance of richly decorated surfaces. The church at Bismarck was redecorated in 1887, the interior painted 'three shades of terra cotta red, relieved by silver chamfers' to create a 'warm and cozy' effect. Also used were light amber for walls and 'faint blue with lime stenciling' for the ceiling. The chancel was elaborately decorated with large panels including "monograms surrounded by a symbolic border of wheat ears and vine leaves".

The church was renamed to St. George's Episcopal Church around 1890, and the building was moved about 10 years later to the corner of Third St. and Rosser Ave. After being replaced by a larger building, the structure was moved in 1965 to Camp Hancock, an army outpost established in 1872 to protect workers building the Northern Pacific. The camp is now a state historic site and open-air museum listed on the National Register of Historic Places.

== Second building ==
=== Planning ===
The congregation had outgrown the original building by the early 1930s and sought a larger church but were hampered by the economic realities of the Great Depression. It raised enough money to purchase land in 1937 directly across from the Governor's Mansion. While informal discussions were held, it was not until January 1941 that architect Herman M. Leonhard, a member of the congregation, was retained to design a new church. Little progress was made until a substantial donation was promised in 1943. In December of that year, four houses on the new site were sold and moved off the church's land, clearing the way for construction which was delayed until the end of World War II. In May 1946, Leonhard was instructed to abandon the original plans and design a building patterned after St. John the Divine Episcopal Church in Moorhead, Minnesota, designed by Cass Gilbert. Construction was awarded to John W. Larson in spring 1948 for a cost of $150,000. Thomas Hall represented Governor Fred G. Aandahl at a groundbreaking ceremony on May 8, the 75th anniversary of the church's first service. Construction was completed over summer 1949 and the first service in the new building was on September 10.

=== Description ===
The building is of Elizabethan Gothic style. The exterior walls were planned to be made of cut Kasota limestone, but were instead made of reinforced poured concrete to reduce cost. The concrete was a lightweight type, mixed with pumice that also raised the insulation value. It is said to be the first building in the northern US to use pumice concrete. The ceiling has large exposed wood beams and the roof was originally covered with asbestos cement shingles. They were later replaced with asphalt shingles. The interior ceiling is tongue-and-groove wood siding and the walls are the same concrete finish as on the exterior.

The scale of the building is appropriate for its residential neighborhood. It has steep-pitched roofs and a single tower, square at the base and octagonal on top measuring 70 ft (21 m) in height with a steeply pitched spire. Cruciform in plan, the church's nave is 28 ft × 126 ft (8.5 m × 38.4 m) and seats 300. Each transept is 11 ft (3.4 m) wide and seats an additional 25 and the chancel holds a choir of 30. The organ was an electronic model made by Wurlitzer. The basement is used as a large hall for dinners, meeting, and recreation, and also contained a kitchen, and other rooms. The cost of the church was $150,000.

=== Dedication ===
In conjunction with the opening of the new building, the church published St. George's Episcopal Memorial Church: A Memorial to the Pioneers of the Dakotas, 1873-1949, a 16-page account of the church's history and a detailed description of the new building and its furnishings and equipment. The book, which sold for 25 cents, described each window including the specific English church whose glass it contained.

=== World War II Memorials ===
The first US flag flown at the new building had draped the casket of a soldier from Bismarck killed in Europe during the post-war occupation. The flag pole itself was dedicated to all soldiers killed during the war. Other items were dedicated to specific soldiers, including a Lieutenant who died in Holland in December 1944; a Captain who survived the Bataan Death March and 45 months of imprisonment but was killed by the bombing of a prison ship sailing to Japan in January 1945; and a Lieutenant co-pilot of a B-17 who was killed on a bombing mission over Germany in August 1944.

=== Stained glass ===
The 45 stained-glass windows were made in Brighton, England, by Barton, Kinder, and Alderson (BKA). The blue and green borders in forty of the windows include pieces of glass salvaged from the windows of over two dozen churches in southeast England that were damaged by bombing in World War II. (Note: In some cases, the windows were blown-out while the buildings were not heavily damaged) The glass was carefully collected and catalogued to maintain its provenance. While many of these churches were built in the modern period, some are from the Late Middle Ages and the earliest, 1100, in the High Middle Ages. There are no other known items made from salvaged English church glass in the United States, nor other work by BKA.

One window, which includes the Seal of North Dakota, a tribute to Thomas Hall, has glass from St. Michael's Church in Southampton, built c. 1100. A window with the Seal of Canterbury contains glass from Holy Trinity Church in Bradford, West Yorkshire, built c. 1864.

Other windows in the church and chapel contain glass from a church in East Langdon, Dover, Kent (built 1500); St Martin's Church, Great Mongeham, Dover, Kent (built 1685); the chapel at All Saint's Hospital in Eastbourne, East Sussex (built 1851); Christ Church, Fairwarp, East Sussex (built 1881); St Mary Magdalene's Church in Lyminster, West Sussex (built 1566); St Saviour's, in Walmer, Dover, Kent (built 1800); St Michael's, Highgate, London (built 1775); a parish church in Chilworth, Hampshire (built 1850); a chapel at a House of recovery in Southampton (built 1914); St Mary Magdalene's Church, St Leonards-on-Sea, East Sussex (built 1850); All Saints Church, in Hastings, East Sussex (built 1553); St Andrew's Church in Bishopstone, East Sussex (built 1561); St Nicolas Church in Pevensey, East Sussex (built 1290); All Saints Church in Hurstmonceaux, East Sussex (rebuilt 13th c.); St. Luke's Church, Southampton (built 1800); St John the Evangelist in Kingsdown, Dover (built 1850); St. Peter the Great, Chichester, West Sussex (built 1810); St. Marys's Church in Ashford, Kent (built 1578); St. Andrews Church, Deal, Kent (build 1850); St Peter's Church in Titchfield, Hampshire (build 1500); All Saints Church in Westbere, Kent (built 1400); (Note: Reported as St. Mary's) St. Bartholomew's, Dover, Kent (built 1800); St. Matthew's Church, Southampton, (built 1800); St Mark's Church in Kennington, London (built 1820); St. Mary Magdalene and St. Denis Church in Midhurst, West Sussex (built 1563); St. Nicholas, in Strood, Kent (build 1565); Holy Trinity Church in Millbrook, Southampton (built 1870); and Old St Mary's Church in Walmer, Kent (built 1560).

The Diocese of North Dakota published a book in 2019; St. George's Episcopal Memorial Church (Bismarck, ND) : The stained glass windows / Prepared by Tom Tudor, photos by Bruce Wendt.

==== Importation ====
Imported stained glass considered artwork for use in churches, and valued at over $15/sq ft, was duty-free under the Tariff Act of 1930. Barton, Kinder, and Alderson was "anxious" to establish a market for their glass in the US and had quoted a very low price of $15/sq. ft, about 30% under market value. Due to devaluation of the British pound while the glass was being produced, the US Treasury Department calculated the value at $13.25/sq ft at time of importation and assessed a tariff of over $1,700 for which the church had not budgeted. The matter was not resolved until 1953 with legislation introduced by North Dakota Senator William Langer that, against the recommendation of the Treasury, waived the duty because the church was acting in good faith.

== Modifications ==
An addition was added in 1996 to provide an alcove, vestibule, elevator, and ADA-compliant restroom in the basement. The original west facade is still visible on the interior of the building, with stained-glass windows now decorative elements on former exterior walls. The walls of the addition were concrete and the roof was timber-framed, all to match the original building. The original organ room was converted to a columbarium c. 2004. The original organ was replaced in 1986 with a larger 1,074-pipe organ made by the Möller Organ Company. As it did not fit in the original location, its installation required movement of other windows.

== National Register of Historic Places (NRHP) ==
St. George's Episcopal Church was listed on the NRHP for its architectural design, including "innovative use of materials and unique artistic details" which "distinguish it from contemporaneous religious buildings in the state". The nomination was reviewed by the Bismarck Historic Preservation Commission on June 16, 2021, and formally listed in October.

== See also ==
- All Saints Episcopal Church (Valley City, North Dakota), the "first stone Episcopal church [built] in North Dakota."
- Bismarck Cathedral Area Historic District, NRHP listed historic district containing Leonhard's self-designed personal residence
- Cox & Barnard, English stained glass studio that made windows for a Canadian church using fragments of glass from damaged European churches
- Robinson Hall, the town hall of Robinson, North Dakota, also designed by Herman M. Leonhard
