= Listed buildings in Walmer =

Civil Parish in Kent, England

Walmer is a town and civil parish in the Dover District of Kent, England. It contains 28 listed buildings that are recorded in the National Heritage List for England. Of these one is grade II* and 27 are grade II.

This list is based on the information retrieved online from Historic England.

== Key ==
Grade	Criteria
I	Buildings that are of exceptional interest
II*	Particularly important buildings of more than special interest
II	Buildings that are of special interest

== Listing ==
Name	Grade	Location	Type	Completed (Note: The date given is the date used by Historic England as significant for the initial building or that of an important part in the structure's description.)	Date designated	Grid ref. (Note: The grid reference is based on the British national grid reference system, sometimes known as OSGB36, used by the Ordnance Survey.) Geo-coordinates	Notes	Entry number (Note: The "List Entry Number" is a unique number assigned to each listed building and scheduled monument by Historic England.)	Image	Wikidata
32-42, Archery Square	II	32-42, Archery Square			8 February 1974	TR3768451062; 51°12′33″N 1°24′06″E		1069906	Upload Photo	Q26323315
Vine Cottage	II	5, Church Street			8 February 1974	TR3688050244; 51°12′08″N 1°23′22″E		1262892	Upload Photo	Q26553735
22, Church Street	II	22, Church Street			8 February 1974	TR3685050298; 51°12′10″N 1°23′21″E		1069862	Upload Photo	Q26323224
Wingrove House	II	24, Church Street			8 February 1974	TR3684450307; 51°12′10″N 1°23′21″E		1069861	Upload Photo	Q26323222
Church of St Mary the Blessed Virgin	II*	Church Street	church building		1 June 1949	TR3669650342; 51°12′12″N 1°23′13″E		1251215	Church of St Mary the Blessed Virgin More images	Q7085072
Walmer Court	II	Church Street			1 June 1949	TR3664350385; 51°12′13″N 1°23′10″E		1069860	Upload Photo	Q26323220
Gothic House	II	275, Dover Road			19 February 1975	TR3691850302; 51°12′10″N 1°23′24″E		1069752	Upload Photo	Q26323018
The Rattling Cat	II	277, Dover Road			1 June 1949	TR3692650281; 51°12′09″N 1°23′25″E		1069831	Upload Photo	Q26323173
Building 12 (officers Mess) South Barracks	II	Dover Road, Lower Walmer			8 February 1974	TR3748851302; 51°12′41″N 1°23′56″E		1363449	Upload Photo	Q26645275
Church of the Sacred Heart	II	Dover Road			4 October 2001	TR3689050136; 51°12′05″N 1°23′23″E		1389387	Upload Photo	Q26668824
Former Kitchen Block to Rear (north West) of Officers Mess	II	Dover Road, Lower Walmer			29 January 1997	TR3749751357; 51°12′43″N 1°23′57″E		1259178	Upload Photo	Q26550320
Building 97, East Barracks	II	East Barracks, The Strand, Lower Walmer			29 January 1997	TR3763851985; 51°13′03″N 1°24′05″E		1259179	Upload Photo	Q26550321
Wall, Gates and Lodges to Former Royal Marines School of Music, East Barracks	II	Gates And Lodges To Former Royal Marines School Of Music, East Barracks, The Strand			8 February 1974	TR3771551989; 51°13′03″N 1°24′09″E		1069748	Upload Photo	Q26323010
Leelands School	II	Gram's Road			1 June 1949	TR3701450017; 51°12′01″N 1°23′29″E		1363456	Upload Photo	Q26645282
Block 20 of South Barracks, Royal Marines Depot	II	Halliday Drive			2 August 1983	TR3756651431; 51°12′45″N 1°24′00″E		1254009	Upload Photo	Q26545709
Liverpool House	II	59, Liverpool Road			8 February 1974	TR3743950179; 51°12′05″N 1°23′51″E		1253230	Upload Photo	Q26545004
Glenthorne Lodge	II	Liverpool Road			1 June 1949	TR3741450153; 51°12′04″N 1°23′50″E		1069816	Upload Photo	Q26323145
Building 65 and Attached Rear Wall, North Barracks	II	North Barracks, North Barrack Road			29 January 1997	TR3756851809; 51°12′58″N 1°24′01″E		1259274	Upload Photo	Q26550411
Building 66 and 67 and Attached Rear Wall, North Barracks	II	North Barracks, North Barrack Road			29 January 1997	TR3759351794; 51°12′57″N 1°24′03″E		1259276	Upload Photo	Q26550413
Building 68 and Attached Rear Wall, North Barracks	II	North Barracks, North Barrack Road			29 January 1997	TR3761751780; 51°12′57″N 1°24′04″E		1259277	Upload Photo	Q26550414
Building 69 (guardhouse), North Barracks	II	North Barracks, North Barrack Road			29 January 1997	TR3764851769; 51°12′56″N 1°24′05″E		1259278	Upload Photo	Q26550415
Main Gateway, Piers and Flanking Railings, South Barracks	II	Piers And Flanking Railings, South Barracks, Dover Road, Lower Walmer			29 January 1997	TR3761151229; 51°12′39″N 1°24′02″E		1259177	Upload Photo	Q26550319
Building 129 (guard House), South Barracks	II	South Barracks, Dover Road, Lower Walmer			29 January 1997	TR3755351133; 51°12′36″N 1°23′59″E		1259176	Upload Photo	Q26550318
Building 13 (north Barrack Block), South Barracks	II	South Barracks, Dover Road, Lower Walmer			29 January 1997	TR3751651346; 51°12′43″N 1°23′58″E		1259236	Upload Photo	Q26550375
16, the Beach	II	16, The Beach			1 June 1949	TR3773151244; 51°12′39″N 1°24′08″E		1250310	Upload Photo	Q26542366
Royal Buildings Zeebrugge House	II	1, The Strand			13 January 1995	TR3769951871; 51°13′00″N 1°24′08″E		1261447	Upload Photo	Q26552395
The Royal Marines School of Music	II	The Strand			8 February 1974	TR3768851982; 51°13′03″N 1°24′08″E		1253979	Upload Photo	Q26545682
Sydney House	II	22, Walmer Castle Road			8 February 1974	TR3717150358; 51°12′11″N 1°23′38″E		1069750	Upload Photo	Q26323014

== See also ==
- Grade I listed buildings in Kent
- Grade II* listed buildings in Kent

== Sources ==
- Newman, John (2013) [1969], Kent: North-East and East, The Buildings of England, New Haven and London: Yale University Press, ISBN 978-0-300-18506-5
