= St Mary's Church, Walmer =

- The Church of St Mary the Virgin
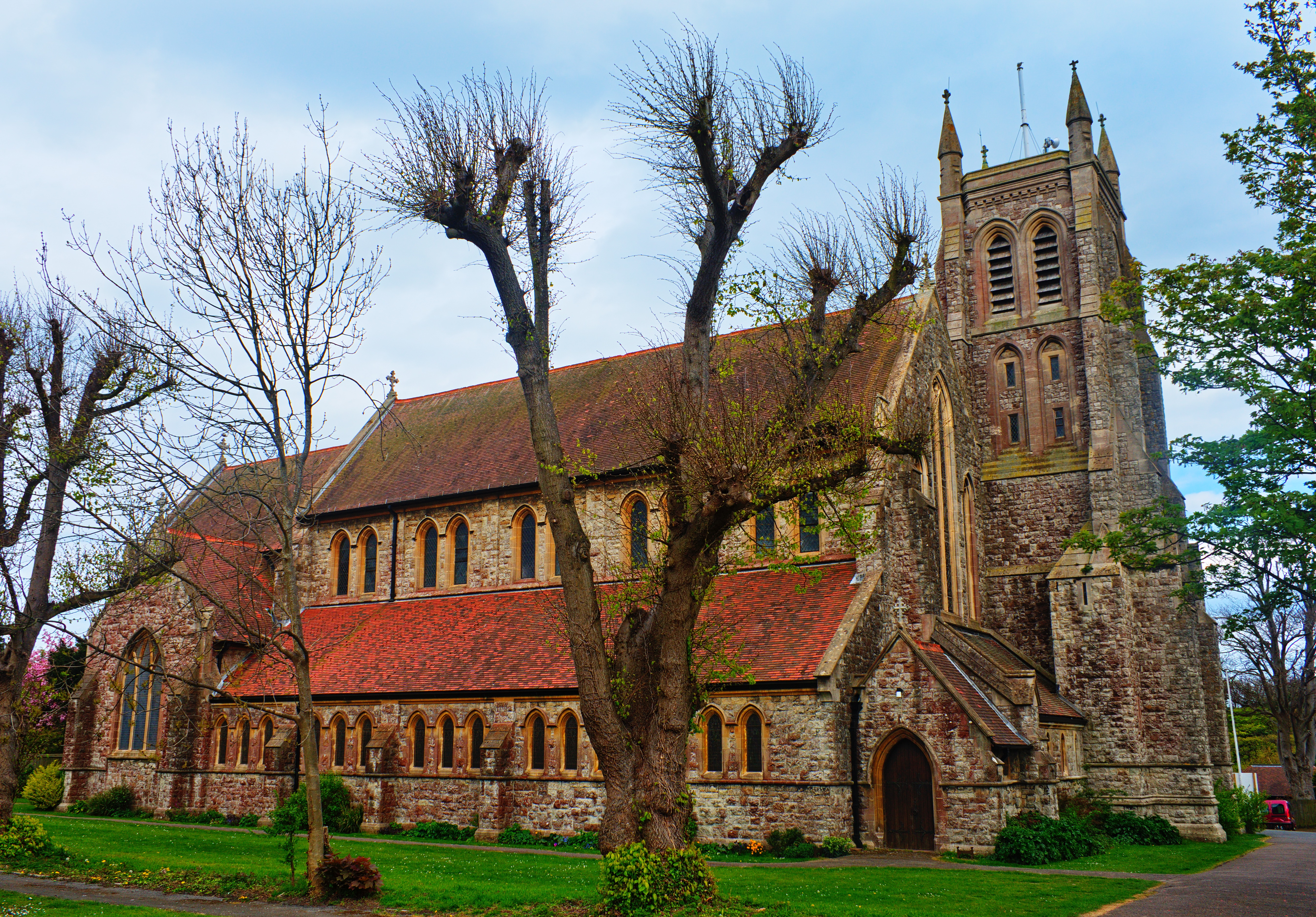
- West view of the church

- Location in Kent
- 51.2012°N 1.3937°E
- OS grid reference: TR368504
- Location: Walmer, Kent
- Country: England
- Denomination: Anglican

History
- Status: Parish church

Architecture
- Functional status: Active
- Architect: Sir Arthur Blomfield

Administration
- Province: Canterbury
- Diocese: Canterbury

The Church of Saint Mary the Virgin, commonly shortened to St Mary's, is a church in the Church of England parish of Walmer, Kent, England.

== History ==
It was designed by Arthur Blomfield in 1887 to take the pressure off the parish's two other churches, the small medieval Old St Mary's and St Saviour's (a Victorian chapel of ease for fishermen on the seafront, opposite the lifeboat house). A spire was designed but never built.

== Art and architecture ==
The entrance is a three-bay baptistery, into a tall clerestoried nave with narrow aisles either side. The main west window portrays nautical episodes of Christ's life (e.g. the miraculous draught of fishes, preaching from the boat, calming the storm), the instruments of the Passion) and Saints Peter and Paul, whilst both aisles have five sets of three lancets each, with those on the north showing saints and apostles and those on the south side showing Old Testament figures from Moses to Hezekiah. Most windows are by Powell. The aisles end not in complete arches but in lean-to ones, connecting to the vestry (south) and the soldiers' chapel (north). The central nave, on the other hand, is divided from the chancel by a low alabaster screen, showing Blomfield's adherence to the Cambridge Camden Society's ideal that a chancel and nave should be structurally separate. At the east end, at the High altar is a reredos designed by Powell's beneath tall triple lancet windows depicting the Ascension, framed by mosaic images of one angel of the left captioned Sperate (Hope for) and another on the right captioned Surgite (Arise). The sanctuary tiling is in brown opus sectile.
