= St Giles' Church, Horsted Keynes =

Church in West Sussex, England

St Giles' Church
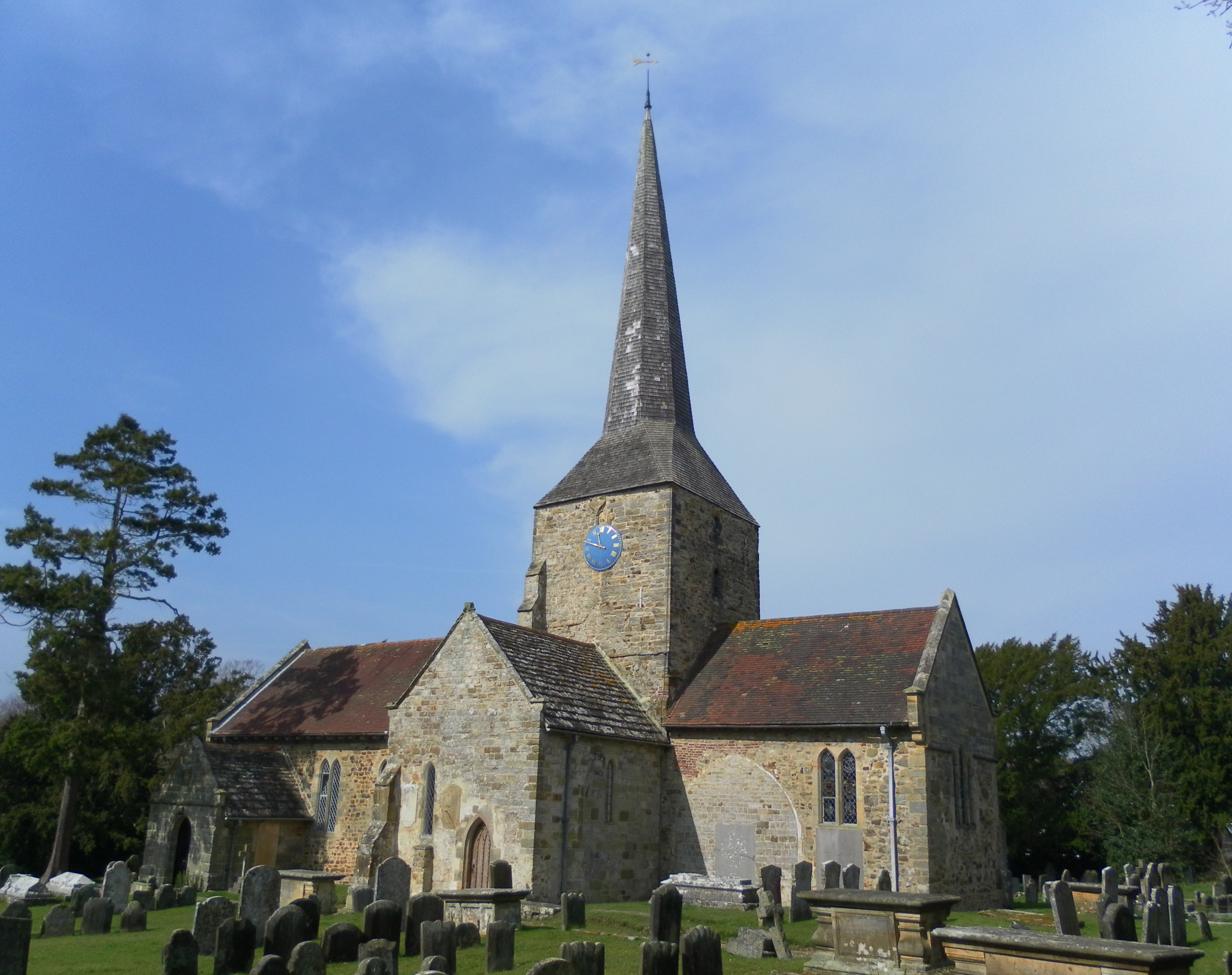
- The church from the south
- St Giles' Church
- 51.0402°N 0.0281°W
- Location: Church Lane, Horsted Keynes, West Sussex RH17 7AY
- Country: England
- Denomination: Church of England
- Website: www.stgileschurchhorstedkeynes.org.uk

History
- Status: Parish church
- Founded: 11th century
- Dedication: Saint Giles

Architecture
- Functional status: Active
- Heritage designation: Grade I
- Designated: 28 October 1957
- Style: Norman architecture

Administration
- Province: Canterbury
- Diocese: Chichester
- Archdeaconry: Horsham
- Deanery: Rural Deanery of Cuckfield
- Parish: Horsted Keynes

Clergy
- Rector: Rev David Murdoch

St Giles' Church is an Anglican church in the village of Horsted Keynes in Mid Sussex, one of seven local government districts in the English county of West Sussex. Serving an extensive rural parish in the Sussex Weald, it stands at the north end of its village on the site of an ancient pagan place of worship. The present building succeeds the original wattle and daub church, its wooden successor and a Saxon stone building—although the Norman architects who erected the cruciform structure in the 12th century preserved parts of the Saxon fabric.

Long established local families have been important in the life of the church for centuries, as indicated by the extensive range of memorials and fittings in the building and its large churchyard. The village got its name from the de Cahaignes family, one of whose ancestors is apparently commemorated by the rare 13th-century "heart shrine" in the chancel. Another family with more recent connections to the parish is the Macmillan publishing dynasty, the most famous of whose sons—former Prime Minister Harold Macmillan—is buried in the family plot.

Various changes have been made to the Norman church, mostly in the 13th and 14th centuries, and some Victorian restoration was undertaken. Nevertheless, the building still retains its original cruciform shape and its central tower topped by a landmark broach spire. The church continues to play an active part in parish life, maintaining links to the local school and holding regular services. English Heritage has listed it at Grade I for its architectural and historical importance.

== History ==
Horsted Keynes is an ancient parish in the centre of Sussex, covering about 5,000 acres (2,020 ha) of heavily forested, mostly rural land which forms part of the Weald. Nearly 480 acres (194 ha) was originally part of the ancient Forest of Anderida, and the soil consists of Hastings Sand and clay with several prominent sandstone ridges. The village stands on one of these. At the time of the Domesday survey in 1086, the parish of Horstede was in the Hundred of Ristone (Note: Later known as Rushmonden.) and the Rape of Pevensey. Sir William de Cahaignes held all the land in the parish, and a Saxon noblewoman called Wulfgifa was the tenant of most of it. The name, derived from the Old English for "place where horses are kept", was later recorded as Orsteda (in 1121) and Horsestud (1190). To distinguish it from another parish called Horsted in the Rape of Pevensey, the names Grethorsted (Note: i.e. Great Horsted. The other parish was, and still is, known as Little Horsted or Horsted Parva.) or Horsted Magna were occasionally used for ecclesiastical purposes. The name that entered regular use, though, was Horsted de Cahaignes—later simplified to Horsted Keynes—in honour of Lord of the manor and principal landowner Sir William de Cahaignes, an associate of Robert de Mortain who also held much land in Cahaignes in Normandy.

Many Sussex churches stand on high ground overlooking their village, but at Horsted Keynes the church was built in a deep dip to the north. This is because the original church on the site—a small wattle and daub structure, later succeeded by a wooden church built from the oak trees prevalent in the Forest of Anderida (a pattern repeated at many villages in the Sussex Weald)—occupied a pre-Christian site of pagan worship. St Giles' Church "may be one of the best examples of re-use of an old religious site" which was again a common practice in Sussex: the present building, like its wooden and wattle and daub predecessors, stands within a stone circle which can still be seen in places, and which probably contained a pagan temple. This may also explain its unusual orientation, northeast–southwest rather than the conventional east–west: the original pre-Christian structures on the site would have been aligned in this way so they would face the sunrise at the summer solstice.

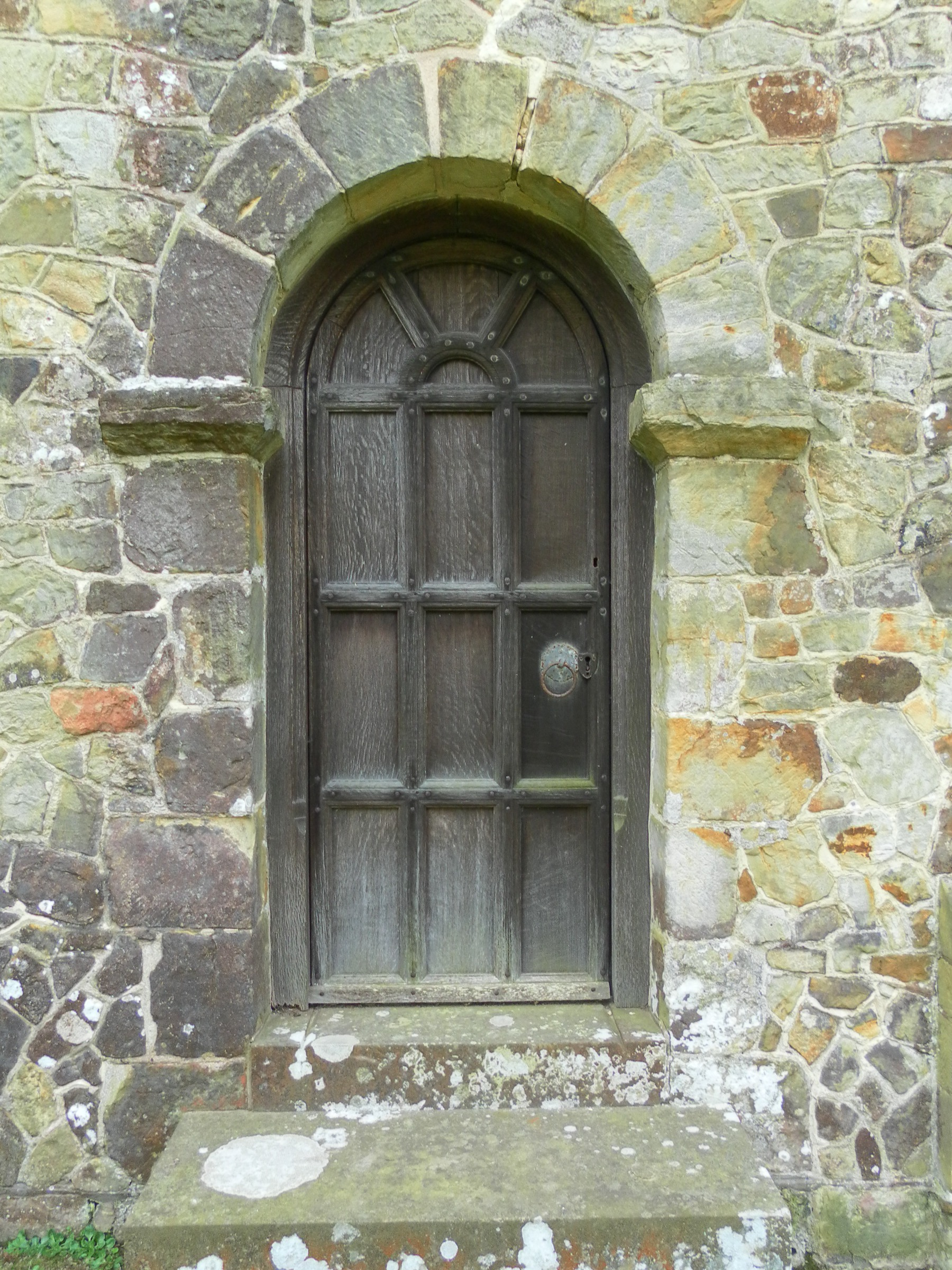
This Saxon doorway was reset in the north aisle, built in 1885.

Although the timber church would have existed at the time of the Domesday survey in 1086, it was not recorded in it; only the village was. The absence of church records from the survey was common, though, as its main purpose was to record landholdings for taxation purposes. By this time, a stone-built Saxon church would have been in place; Ralph de Cahaignes possibly ordered its construction to replace the old wooden building. After the Norman conquest, many Sussex churches were rebuilt in Norman style, although Saxon fabric was sometimes retained, and this happened at Horsted Keynes. One doorway and the foot of the tower survive from the Saxon era; the doorway has been repositioned in the north aisle.

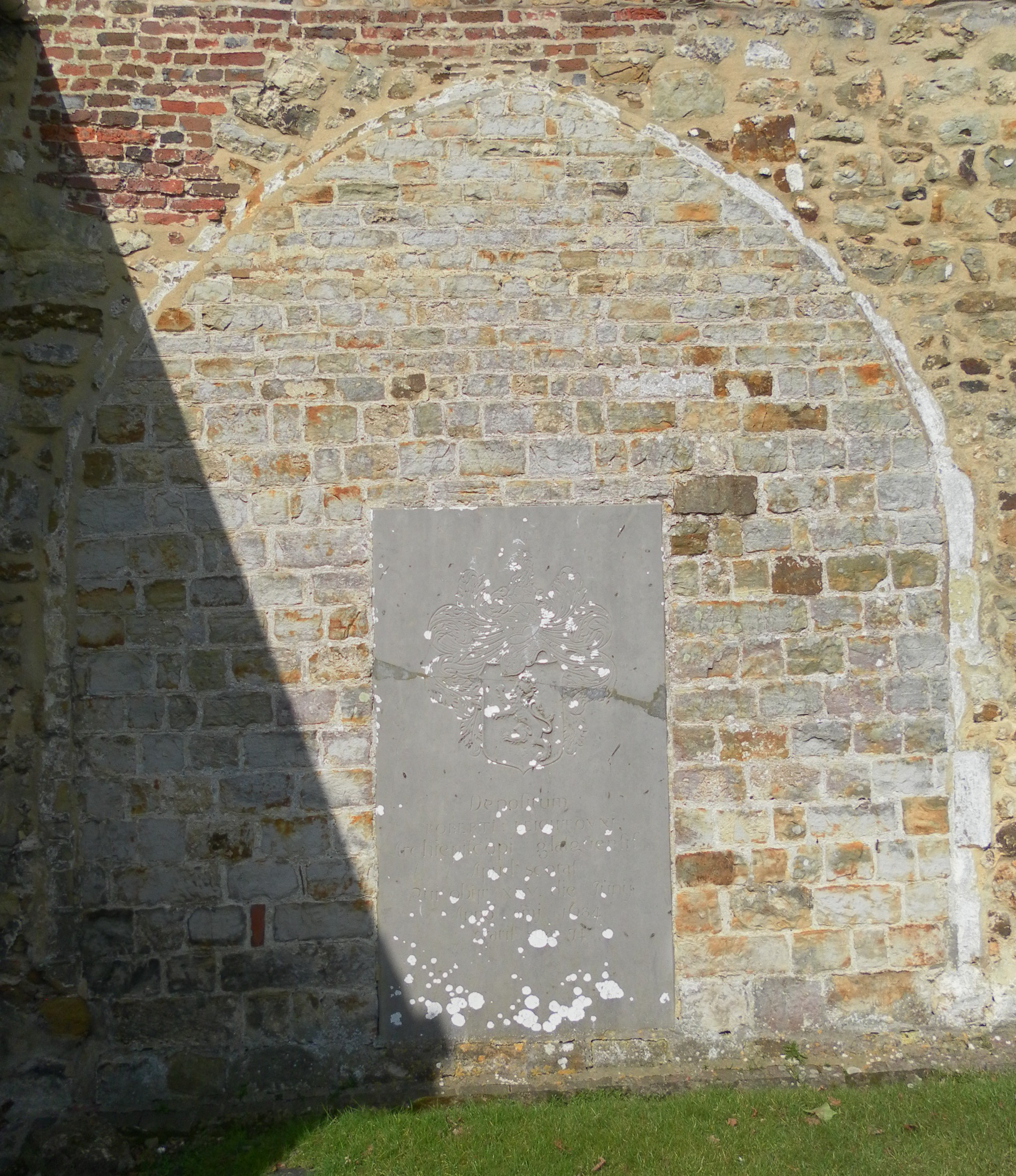
This pointed arch is all that remains of the 14th-century former chantry chapel.

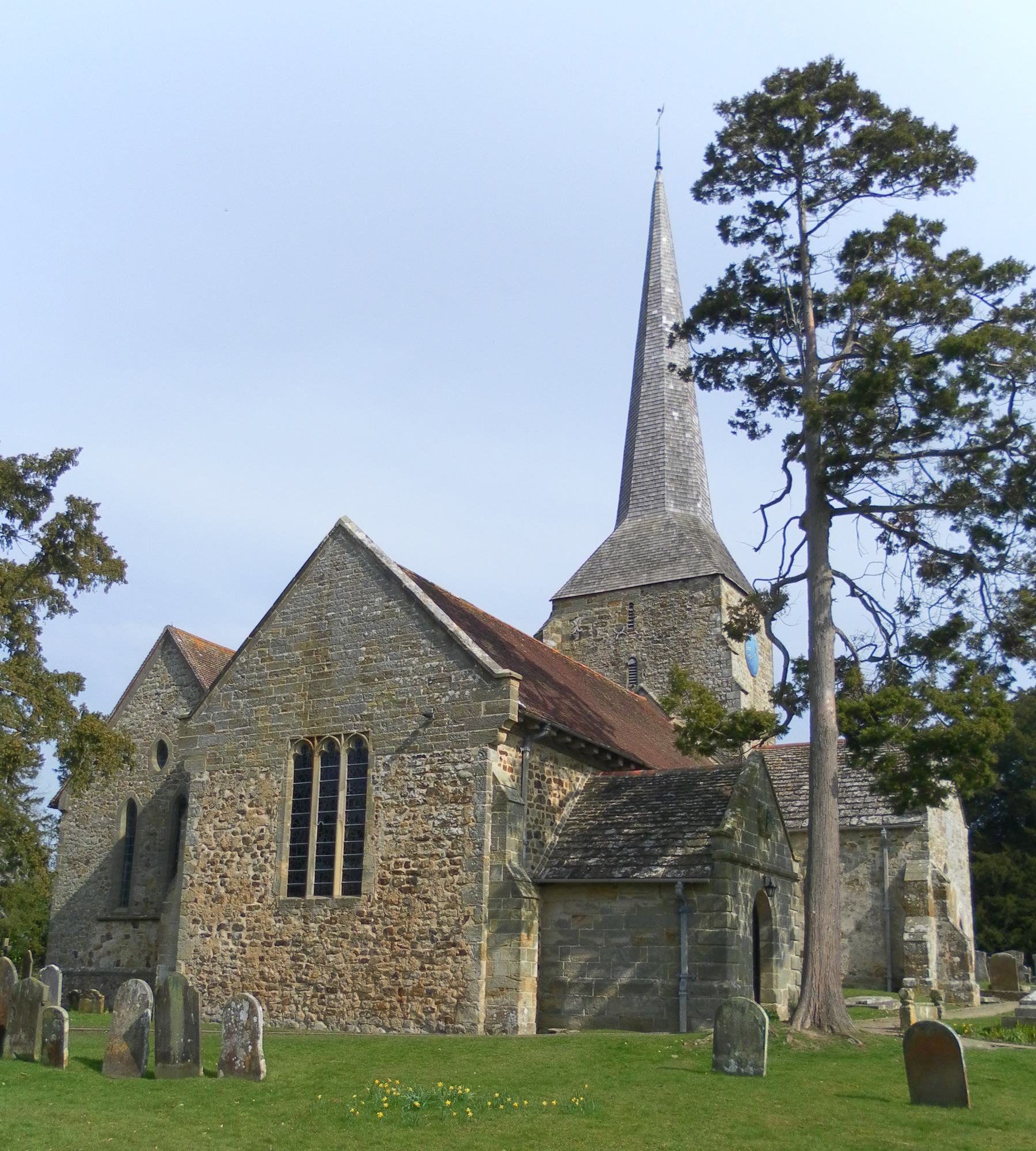
From left to right, the north aisle, west end of the nave, southwest porch and south transept are visible.

In place of the Saxon building, the Normans constructed a large cruciform church with a central tower and tall, sharp spire which forms a landmark for miles around despite the church standing in a dip. The four arms of the cross were formed by the nave, the chancel and a north and south transept. The chancel had an apse and a narrow chancel arch. In about 1220 (the Early English Gothic architectural period) many changes were made. The apse was removed and the chancel was completely rebuilt with a square end and a longer floorplan. Lancet windows were installed, including a large triple window in the new east end. The south transept was also reconstructed and given lancets. The old transept must have been smaller and lower, more like a porch, because the low original 12th-century arches leading to the crossing were retained.

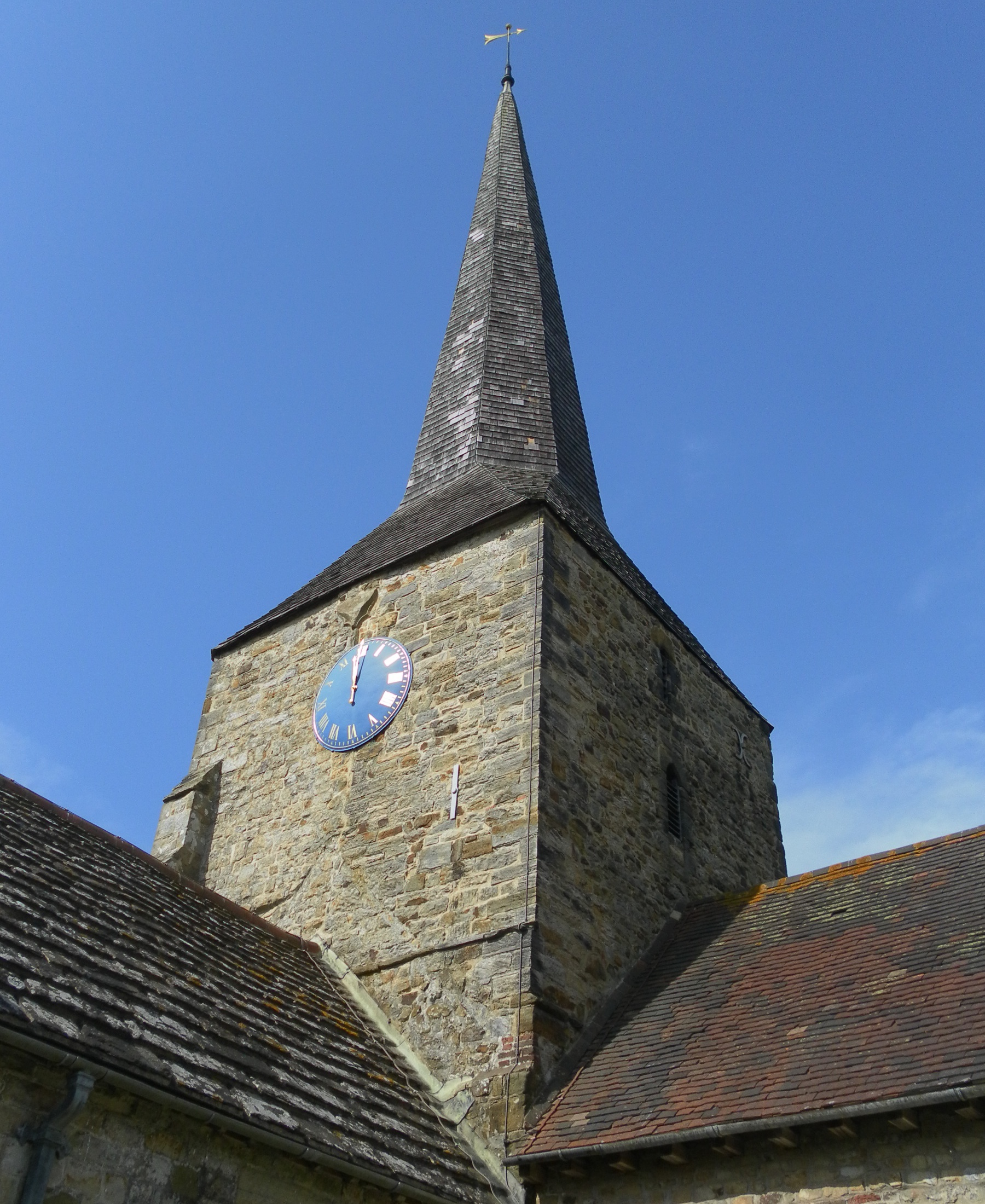
The tower is topped with a landmark spire.

More changes took place in the early 14th century, by which time English Gothic architecture had moved into its Decorated Gothic phase. A new wider chancel arch was installed between the crossing and the chancel, a side chapel was added on the north side, new windows were added in the nave, and the original rounded west arch of the crossing (into the nave) was replaced by a new pointed arch. The side chapel probably replaced the old north transept, which was removed "for some reason unknown"; its roofline can still be traced. All of this work apparently took place between 1320 and 1330. One contemporary feature that has now disappeared was a chantry chapel dedicated to Marie de Bradehurst. It was built alongside the chancel and was latterly used as a schoolroom until it was removed in the Victorian era. The dedication relates to the Broadhurst manor in Horsted Keynes parish. The demolition of the chapel revealed the outline of a wide blocked pointed arch on the south wall, which is still clearly visible.

Later work included reconstructing the porch at the southwest corner—dated to the late 17th century—and reinforcing the tower and the west walls of the nave, necessitated by the subsidence of the tower caused by the removal in the 14th century of its north transept and its original rounded west arch. The tower started to lean, and its tall spire accentuated the problem. Buttresses were added in four places, and iron ties were inserted later to bring the tower back towards the vertical. The spire is known to have been in place by 1667, when lightning struck it and dislodged 3,000 shingles. (Note: This incident is documented in Rector Giles Moore's famous diaries, which ran for 23 years from 1656 and which were republished in 1971: "On Aug. 8, Thurs. 1667, 10–11 a.m., the Church was struck by lightning. 3000 shingles came off the spire.")

Victorian restoration was carried out at the church, as at many ancient churches in Sussex. Spencer Slingsby Stallwood, a Reading-based architect, was commissioned to carry out his only work at a Sussex church at St Giles' in 1885, in association with his colleague Joseph Morris. The work may have continued until 1888, and involved the construction of a north aisle and arcade, the replacement of the 18th-century king post roof, and some improvements to the north chapel, apparently instead of an earlier scheme (announced in 1840) to rebuild the demolished north transept. The old king post roof had been installed in 1714. Changes inside included the removal of old box pews and a wooden gallery at the west end, which had latterly been used by church musicians. The work cost £2,300. The Saxon doorway, which was once believed to be a "Devil's door", was inserted in the new north aisle during this work. More restoration was carried out between 1959 and 1960 or 1961 by Brighton architect John Leopold Denman's firm Denman & Son; his work revealed traces of an old Norman window in the nave.

For many years the church was a peculier of the Archbishop of Canterbury rather than being held by the Bishop of Chichester, head of the local diocese. It was also one of about 20 churches in the area covered by the diocese at which the ancient Law of Sanctuary applied.

== Architecture ==
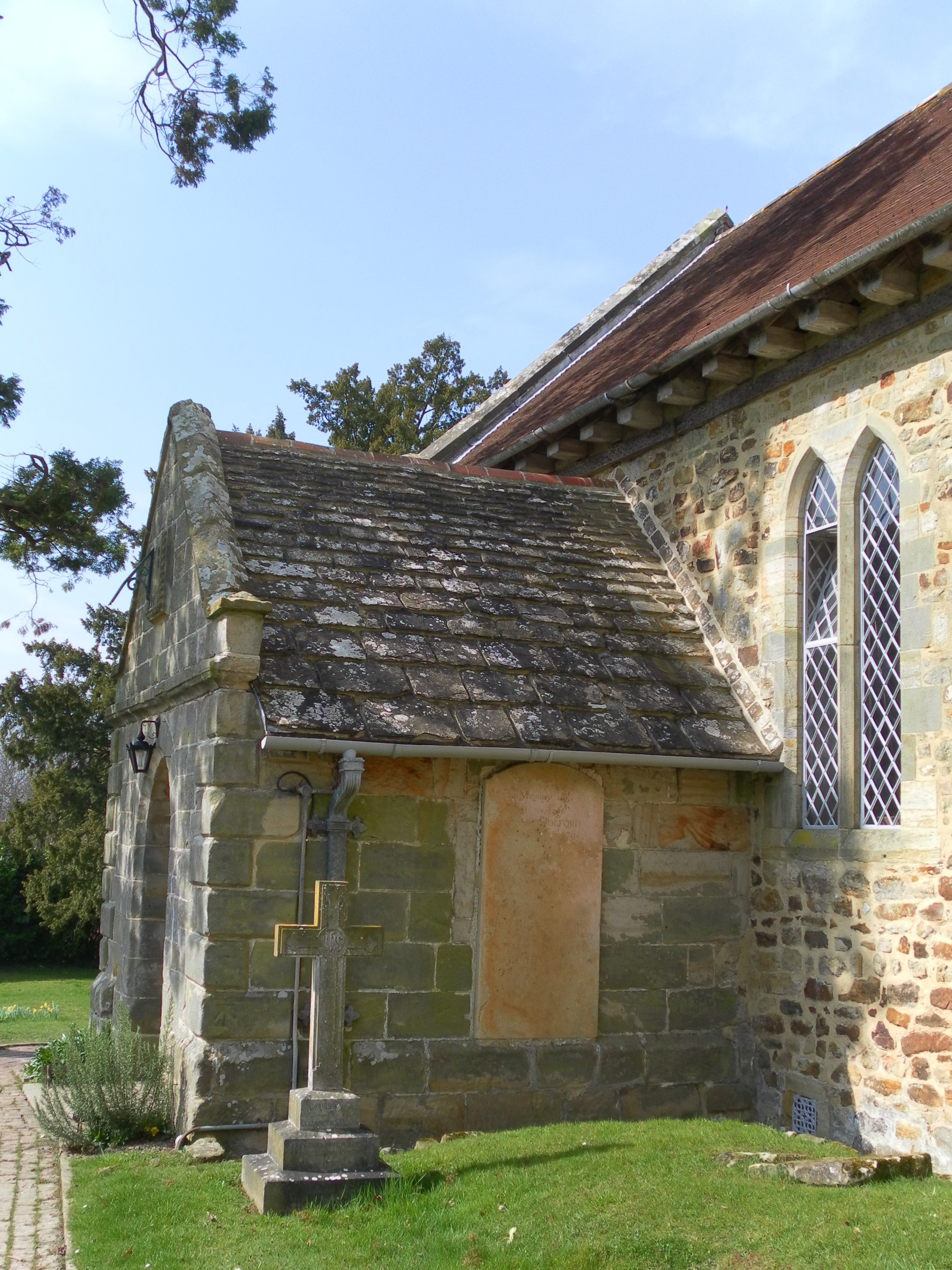
The church has lancet windows, sandstone walls and a stone porch.

St Giles' Church stands on a northeast–southwest alignment. Its nave is 18° north of east and the chancel 13°; this skewed construction recalls the leftward tilting of Christ's head on the cross. In its present form, it is roughly cruciform and consists of a nave and shorter chancel separated by a crossing upon which the tower rests, a south transept, a north chapel, an arcaded north aisle and the remains of a south chapel and north transept. There are arches to each of the four sides of the crossing. The church is built of locally hewn sandstone laid in large, rough blocks with wide joints. The stone has been weathered to a dark brown colour in places.

A Saxon doorway, reset in the new north aisle in 1885, is the oldest surviving part of the church. Less elaborate than the Saxon entrance at nearby St Mary Magdalene's Church, Bolney, it is round-arched with narrow voussoirs and has jambs made of five large, roughly cut stones on each side (inside) and six more cleanly hewn and regular stones (outside). The entrance is 5 feet 10 inches (1.78 m) high and 3 feet 1 inch (0.94 m) wide. The voussoirs are each about 5 inches (13 cm) wide, and there are nine inside and seven outside.

In the crossing, the round-headed east- and south-facing arches, each 6 feet 4 inches (1.93 m) high to the imposts, 10 feet (120 in) high to the top of the arch and 6 feet 4 inches (1.93 m) wide, are from the original Norman building and are supported on four square piers each 4 feet (48 in) thick. The pointed west arch was inserted in the 14th century, and the north arch is a much later restoration in the Norman style. The tower was not part of the original church: it was built over the crossing later. It is topped with a tall, slim, sharply pointed broach spire with an octagonal base and a covering of shingles.

The chancel was rebuilt in the 13th century in the Early English Gothic style. At its west end is a 14th-century Decorated Gothic chancel arch. This measures 11 feet 10 inches (3.61 m) by 7 feet 2 inches (2.18 m); the height to the imposts is 7 feet 10 inches (2.39 m). The imposts are thin (about 5 inches (13 cm) across), are made up of two stones and have been partly renewed—perhaps to support the weight of the tower when it was added. The jambs of the chancel arch are supported on plinths that project only slightly. Tall slabs, up to 21 inches (53 cm) high, make up the jambs, which then support a pointed arch made up of ten voussoirs.

The nave mostly retains its original appearance, except for the insertion of later windows in the Perpendicular Gothic style. The north wall was taken out in 1885 when the aisle was built; in its place a three-bay arcade was inserted, of which the easternmost bay reused 14th-century fabric. A piscina whose upper part is of ancient origin was placed in the south wall during the early 20th-century incumbency of Rev. Frederick H.D. Smythe, who discovered it in the tower.

== Fixtures and fittings ==
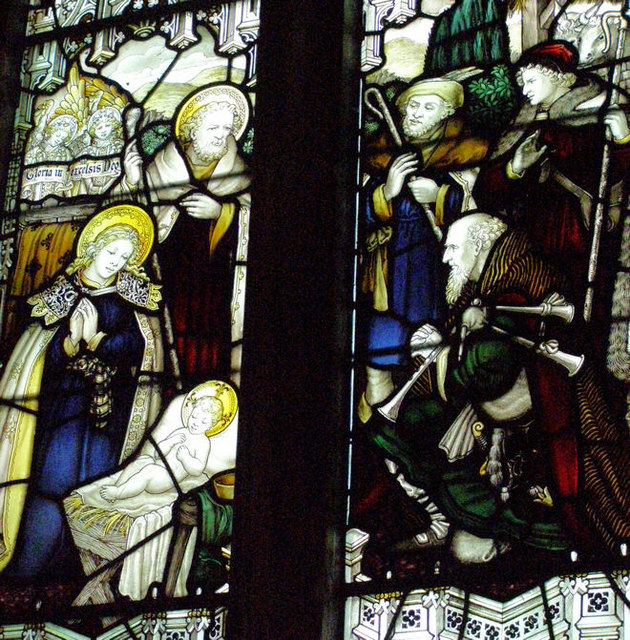
St Giles' Church has stained glass from the 19th and 20th centuries.

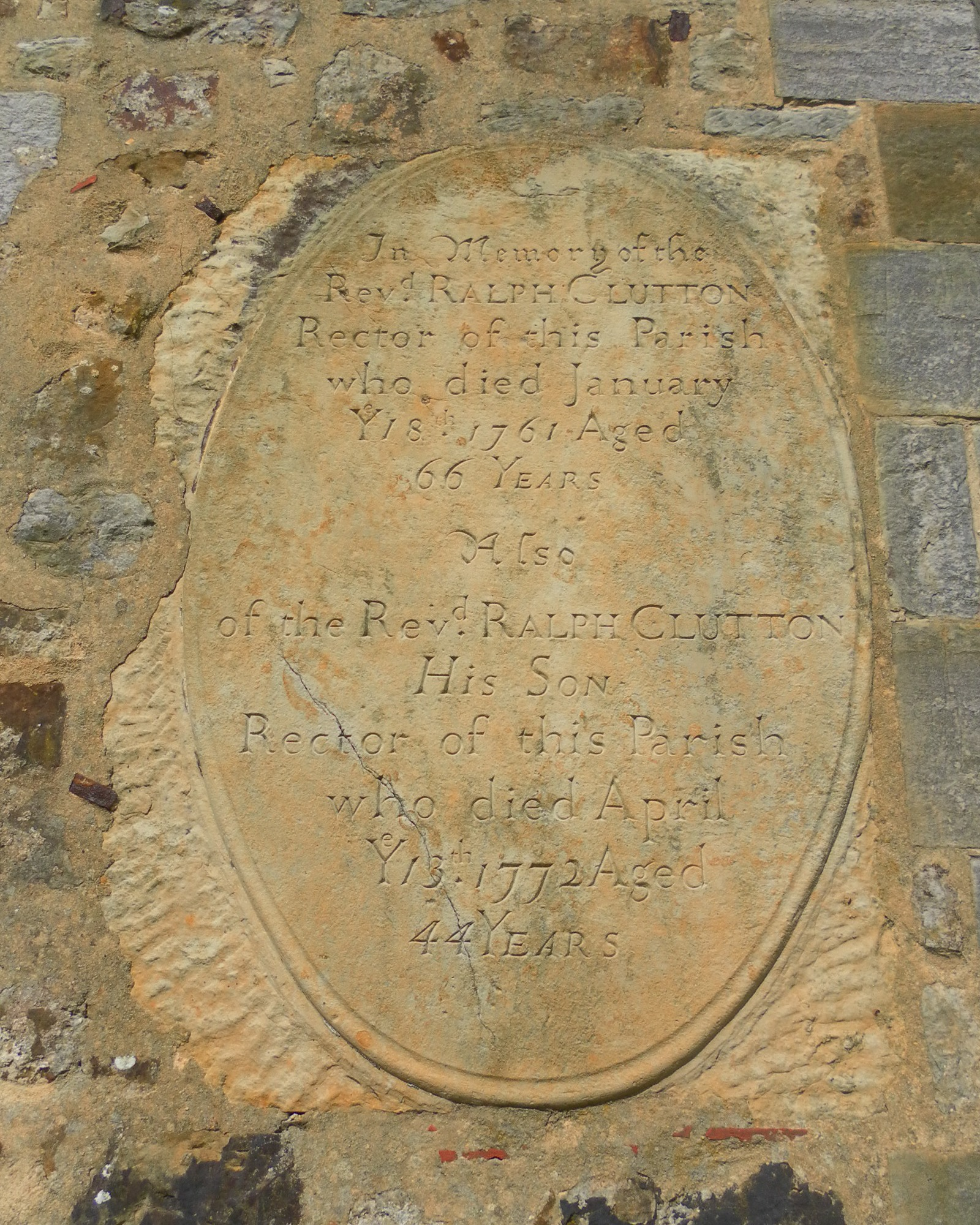
Many memorials can be found inside and outside the church.

The church has late 19th- and early 20th-century stained glass. The oldest window is in the north wall of the chancel, designed by the Jones & Willis firm in about 1892. Charles Eamer Kempe designed the east window of the chancel in 1895; it depicts the Crucifixion of Jesus. Another Jones & Willis window, dating from 1895 and depicting Faith, is in the crossing, and they also designed a second window in the north wall of the chancel in about 1908. The west window of the nave has Kempe glass from 1905 depicting the Presentation of Jesus at the Temple, and his firm Kempe & Co. installed stained glass in the north aisle in 1910 and 1925 and in the nave in 1919 and 1926. Later windows include Morris & Co. and Wippell & Co. designs of 1950, both in the north aisle, and a 1956 design by the Barton, Kinder and Alderson firm in the north wall of the chancel.

The three bells date from the 17th century and are set in a 7-foot (2.1 m) bell-cage contemporary with the spire. They are inscribed as follows:

1. (Treble bell): John Palmar Bel Fovndar made me 1653
2. (Call bell): Edmund Giles of Lewes made me Anno D^{ni} 1604
3. (Tenor bell): Gloria Deo in excelsis 1633 b e (Bryan Eldridge, represented by the initials b e, cast bells at Chertsey in Surrey between 1618 and 1640.)

Inside and outside the church are a wide range of memorial tablets, slabs and stones commemorating members of locally important families such as the Wyat(t)s, Lightmakers and Piggot(t)s. Most date from between the 17th and 19th centuries. Examples include white marble tablets by the north and east walls of the chancel (the latter is topped with an urn); two grey marble tablets by the south wall—one with an inscribed shield decoration, the other supported on columns with decorative capitals and bearing a shield with a coat of arms; an engraved marble slab near the chancel arch; one embedded in the south transept floor; and a series of blue and white marble stones by the vestry. Many have lengthy commemorative inscriptions.

A rare "heart shrine"—a memorial to a parishioner who died abroad (usually during the Crusades) but whose heart was returned and buried in the church—is in the chancel. It measures 27 inches (69 cm) and is placed in an alcove 34 inches (86 cm) long and 30 inches (76 cm) above the floor. It was designed in about 1270 and may commemorate Richard de Cahaignes or one of his family. A study in 1846 described the effigy as being "of a fine grained oolite or sandstone" and taking the form of a cross-legged knight wearing 13th-century armour (painted rather than carved on to the stone, and now invisible) and holding a sword but no shield. The lower parts of the knight's arms have broken away, but the hands would have been clasped in prayer. One writer on the subject of effigies (Note: H.R. Mosse, in The Monumental Effigies of Sussex.) has stated that it is "one of the most curious and interesting monumental effigies in Sussex, if not in England".

The font is simple and unadorned, octagonal in shape and dates from about 1500. The church also has a brass cross made in Florence in 1550 and restored in 1907. During its restoration it was inscribed l.c.f. a.m.d.g. k.b.m., referring to the initials of the donors and the Latin phrase "Ad Majorem Dei Gloriam" (Glory to God in the highest). The pulpit, its screen and the lectern were donated to the church at various times; several saints were carved on the pulpit by a member of the local Wyatt family. The church organ dates from 1904, reused some equipment from its predecessor and cost £310.

== Churchyard ==
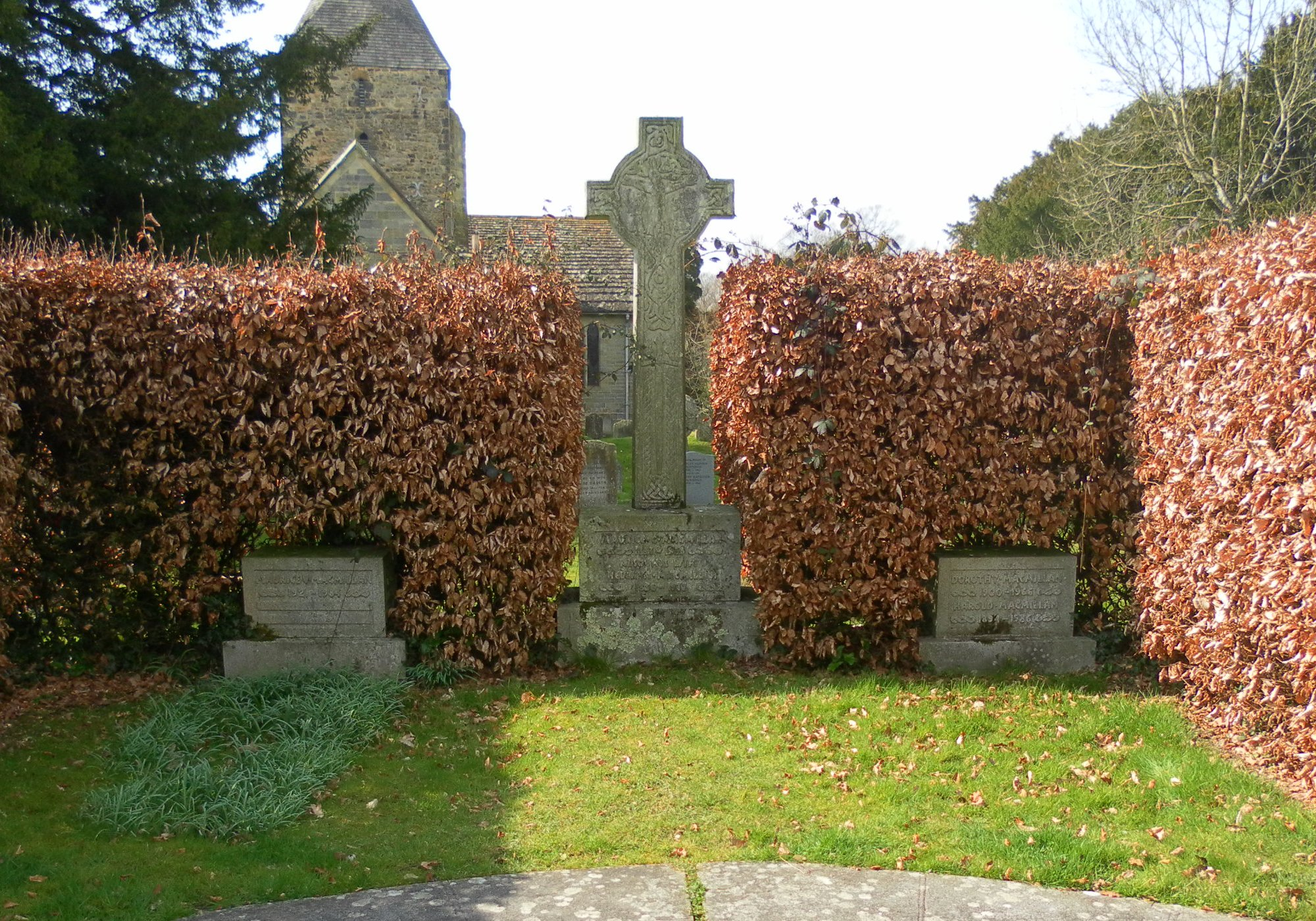
The Macmillan family plot has a Celtic cross at the centre.

The churchyard is surrounded by the remains of a pre-Christian fosse and vallum about 120 yards (110 m) in diameter. This area also incorporates some surrounding buildings such as St Giles' School: the churchyard does not cover the whole extent of the pagan site. It was extended in 1925, and in 1937 nearly 250 ancient gravestones were re-erected by the incumbent rector. Many of the gravestones date from the 17th and 18th centuries, including two gigantic stone slabs that were moved from the demolished south chapel to the wall outside the chancel.

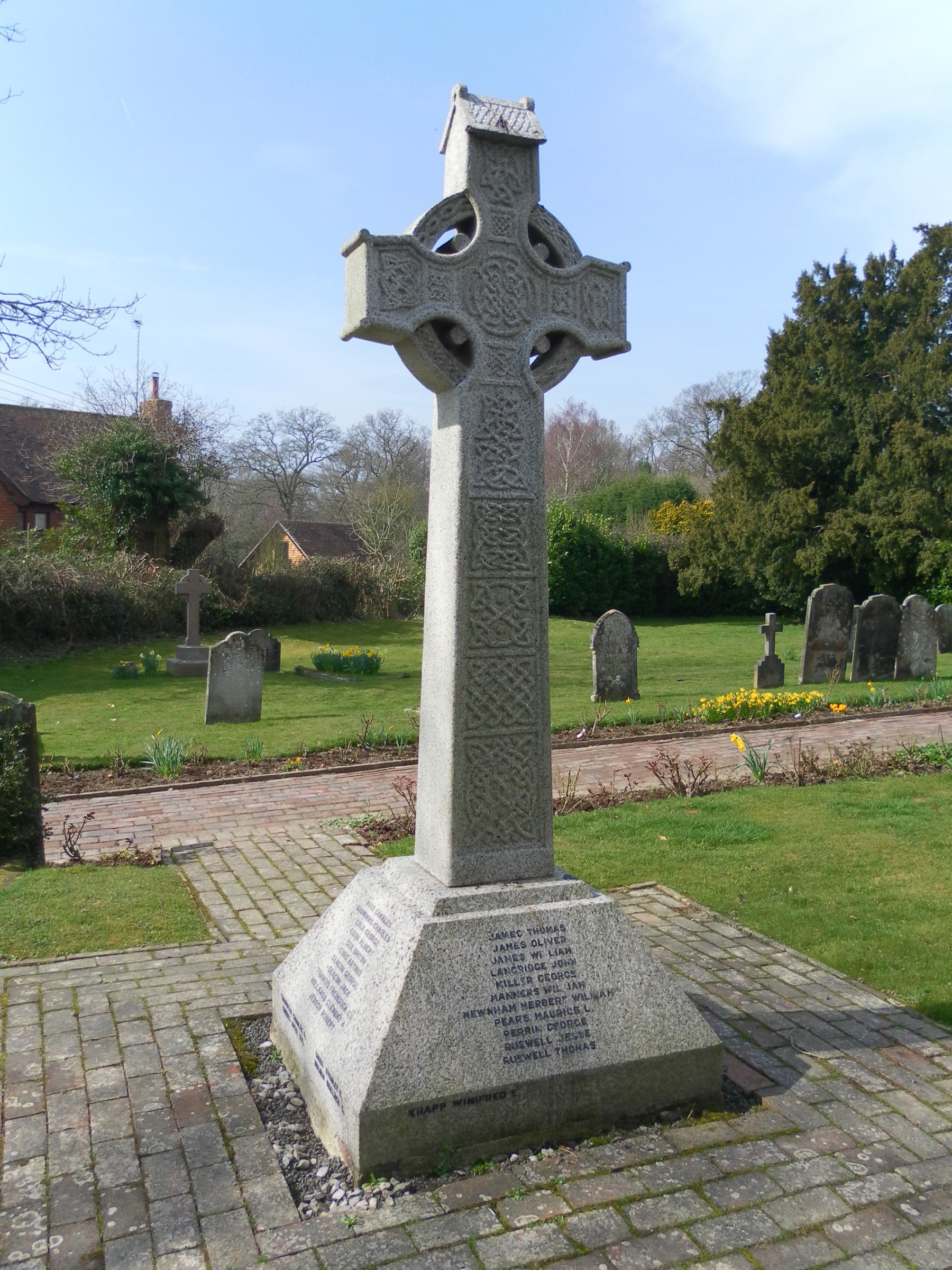
The parish war memorial was erected in 1920.

The parish war memorial, a copy of Muiredach's High Cross at the ruined monastery of Monasterboice, Ireland, was put up in 1920 and commemorates 33 soldiers who died in World War I. Names from World War II have also been added. Also found in the churchyard are some wood and stone "dead boards", an early type of grave marker that was easier to produce than a headstone. They consist of a wooden board supported on two small stones. Moreover, this churchyard contain two burials in the incident of World War II.

Many members of the Michelborne family of Broadhurst Manor are buried in the churchyard. Another family who lived locally, at Birch Grove House in the northeast of the parish, were the descendants of Daniel MacMillan, founder of the Macmillan publishing house. His son Maurice Crawford MacMillan and Maurice's wife Helen (née Tarleton Belles) are buried in the churchyard in graves overlooked by an "impressive runic Cross, a replica of the MacMillan Cross at Kilmory Knap, Argyllshire". Maurice and Helen's son was Harold Macmillan, Prime Minister of the United Kingdom between 1957 and 1963; when he died in 1986 he was also buried here, alongside his son Maurice junior who had predeceased him.

Also buried in the churchyard is Henry Piggott, a member of the locally prominent Piggot(t) family. His "seemingly very odd memorial" by the southwest corner of the chancel states that he was born on 30 December 1715 and died on 7 March 1715. The gravestone is an example of the use of Old Style (Julian calendar) dates in the period before 1752, when the Gregorian calendar was introduced. The new year started on 25 March rather than 1 January, so Henry Piggott lived for about nine weeks.

== Associated buildings ==
=== Mission churches ===
The large parish has several hamlets, and in the late 19th and early 20th century there were two chapels of ease serving outlying areas. Both were linked to St Giles' Church, and neither survive. Freshfield Mission Church, located at 51.0132°N 0.0309°W in the hamlet of Freshfield, opened for worship on 15 November 1897 after a dedication ceremony by the Archdeacon of Lewes. It was built during that year through the efforts of Rev. C.R. Heald, who served St Giles' Church at the time. A local man donated the land, but building and fitting out the chapel cost £140 (£15,700 in 2025 pounds)). A Sunday school was held in the building, and by 1939 it was still "used for occasional services". The 1965 Ordnance Survey map indicates that it was latterly called St John the Baptist's Chapel.

Cinder Hill Mission Church served the hamlet of Cinder Hill north of Horsted Keynes village. The building, no more than a hut, was moved to its new location in 1919; previously it had been used as a Soldiers' Church at an unspecified location on the English Channel coast. The cost of buying, moving and installing the structure on its new site was £85 (£3,800 in 2025 pounds)). A Sunday school used the building, and some religious services were held.

=== Martindale Centre ===
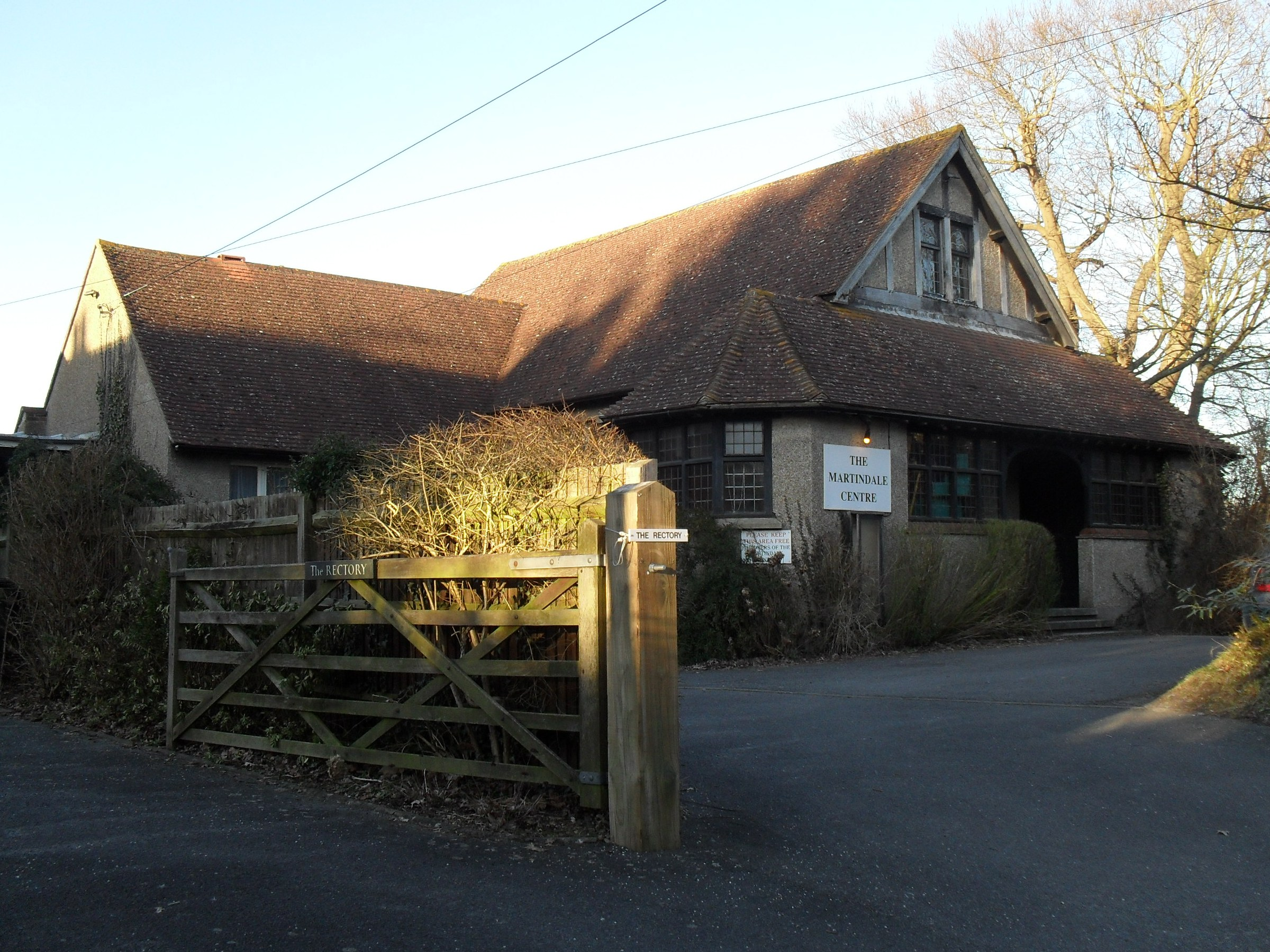
The Martindale Centre was originally an independent Congregational chapel. Louisa Martindale founded it in 1907.

The Martindale Centre, named after Louisa Martindale, is used as the church office and parish hall. It was built in 1907 as a Congregational chapel. Martindale moved to Horsted Keynes in 1903 and founded the chapel as a testament to her belief in the right of women to preach. The building is of red brick and was extended in 1950 before it was sold by the Congregational church.

=== Parish rooms ===
During the incumbency of Rev. Frederick H.D. Smythe (1900–1909), two new buildings were provided for the benefit of parishioners. When he became rector, there was a building near the church that was divided into two parts, used for church business and as a working men's club respectively. After the latter stopped using it, Smythe opened the building out, extended it and turned it into a parish room for church activities. It is held in trust by the Diocese of Chichester. Later in the 20th century, electricity and heating were installed and the building was enlarged further. Smythe also built a new room for the Church Lads Brigade in 1908. Called the "Young Men's Room", it was erected at a cost of £42 and was again placed in the possession of the Diocese.

=== St Giles' School ===
Children of the parish were originally educated in the chantry chapel of Marie de Bradehurst, which was part of the church. When this was demolished in about 1850, lessons moved to the south transept until the present St Giles' School was built in 1884. It was initially described as a "Church of England (Non-Provided) Elementary School", and was provided by the Lightmaker family—therefore it was also known as the Lightmaker School. As of 2013, it was known as St Giles' Church of England Primary School and is a voluntary aided school. Pupils attend an assembly in the church every Friday morning.

== Today ==
St Giles' Church was listed at Grade I by English Heritage on 28 October 1957. Such buildings are defined as being of "exceptional interest" and greater than national importance. As of February 2001, it was one of 16 Grade I listed buildings, and 1,028 listed buildings of all grades, in the district of Mid Sussex.

The ecclesiastical parish of Horsted Keynes covers a mostly rural area of Mid Sussex, much longer from north to south than it is wide. Part of the northern boundary runs along Top Road between West Hoathly and Sharpthorne. To the east, it follows the West Sussex/East Sussex county boundary from near Wych Cross to the River Ouse near Freshfield. The river then forms the southern boundary, and a tributary called Cockhaise Brook is the parish's western limit.

St Giles is open daily from around 8 am to 6 pm. Two Eucharistic services take place every Sunday 8 am and 10 am. The eucharist is celebrated every Friday 10:30 am and on feast days. Lay-led evening prayer is said every Wednesday 6:30 pm. Weekly services are also held for pupils of St Giles' Primary School.

== See also ==
- Grade I listed buildings in West Sussex
- List of places of worship in Mid Sussex
- Media related to St Giles' Church, Horsted Keynes at Wikimedia Commons

== Bibliography ==
- Arscott, David (1993). Curiosities of West Sussex: a County Guide to the Unusual. Seaford: S.B. Publications. ISBN 1-85770-017-1.
- Beevers, David; Marks, Richard; Roles, John (1989). Sussex Churches and Chapels. Brighton: The Royal Pavilion, Art Gallery and Museums. ISBN 0-948723-11-4.
- Collins, Sophie (2007). A Sussex Miscellany. Alfriston: Snake River Press. ISBN 978-1-906022-08-2.
- Coppin, Paul (2006). 101 Medieval Churches of West Sussex. Seaford: S.B. Publications. ISBN 1-85770-306-5.
- Elleray, D. Robert (2004). Sussex Places of Worship. Worthing: Optimus Books. ISBN 0-9533132-7-1.
- Fisher, E.A. (1970). The Saxon Churches of Sussex. Newton Abbot: David & Charles. ISBN 0-7153-4946-5.
- Nairn, Ian; Pevsner, Nikolaus (1965). The Buildings of England: Sussex. Harmondsworth: Penguin Books. ISBN 0-14-071028-0.
- Pé, Diana (2006). Mid Sussex Church Walks. PP (Pé Publishing). ISBN 0-9543690-2-5.
- Salter, Mike (2000). The Old Parish Churches of Sussex. Malvern: Folly Publications. ISBN 1-871731-40-2.
- Stenton Eardley, Frank (1939). Horsted Keynes, Sussex: The Church and Parish of St Giles. London: Macmillan & Co. Ltd.
- Swinfen, Warden; Arscott, David (1984). Hidden Sussex. Brighton: BBC Radio Sussex. ISBN 0-9509510-0-5.
- Vigar, John (1986). Exploring Sussex Churches. Rainham: Meresborough Books. ISBN 0-948193-09-3.
- Wales, Tony (1999). The West Sussex Village Book. Newbury: Countryside Books. ISBN 1-85306-581-1.
- Whiteman, Ken; Whiteman, Joyce (1998). Ancient Churches of Sussex. Seaford: S.B. Publications. ISBN 1-85770-154-2.
