= Barton, Kinder and Alderson =

English stained glass company

Barton, Kinder, and Alderson
- Industry: Stained glass studio
- Founded: c. 1945 in Hove, Brighton, England
- Founders: Kenneth M. Barton, Claude Kinder, Albert E Alderson
- Defunct: c. 1977
- Headquarters: 12 Prestonville Road, Brighton

Barton, Kinder, and Alderson was an English producer of stained glass, primarily for churches in southern England in the second half of the 20th century.

The company was formed as a partnership between Kenneth M Barton, Claude Kinder, and Albert E Alderson in Hove, Brighton, England, after World War II. Although Kinder had made at least one window under his own name, all three had been employees of Cox and Barnard before starting the company.

Kinder died in 1949 (aged 51–52) , after which Barton and Alderson continued to provide glass, mostly in southeast England. Barton operated Kenneth Barton Studios until at least 1984. Alderson produced glass under the name of the partnership until at least 1967 and remained in business for another decade after that.

At some point in his career, prolific glass artist Francis Walter Skeat designed glass for the company.

Examples of their work can be found in:

- St Giles' Church, Horsted Keynes
- Holy Trinity Church, Bledlow
- St Peter & Paul Church, Wingrave

== Sales in the United States ==
The firm provided 45 stained-glass windows to St. George's Episcopal Memorial Church in Bismarck, North Dakota, in 1949. Parts of forty of the windows included pieces of glass salvaged from the windows of over two dozen churches in southeast England that were destroyed by bombing in World War II. (Note: In some cases, the windows were blown-out while the buildings were not heavily damaged)

Imported stained glass considered artwork for use in churches, and valued at over $15/sq ft (930 cm^{2}), was duty-free under the Tariff Act of 1930. The firm was "anxious" to establish a market for their glass in the US and had quoted a very low price of $15/sq ft, about 30% under market value. Due to devaluation of the British pound while the glass was being produced, the US Treasury Department calculated the value at $13.25/sq. ft. at time of importation and assessed a tariff of over $1,700 which the church had not anticipated. The matter was not resolved until 1953 with legislation introduced by North Dakota Senator William Langer that, against the recommendation of the Treasury, waived the duty because the church was acting in good faith.

There are no other known items made by the firm in the United States.
