= St. John the Divine Episcopal Church (Moorhead, Minnesota) =

Historic church in Minnesota, United States

- U.S. National Register of Historic Places
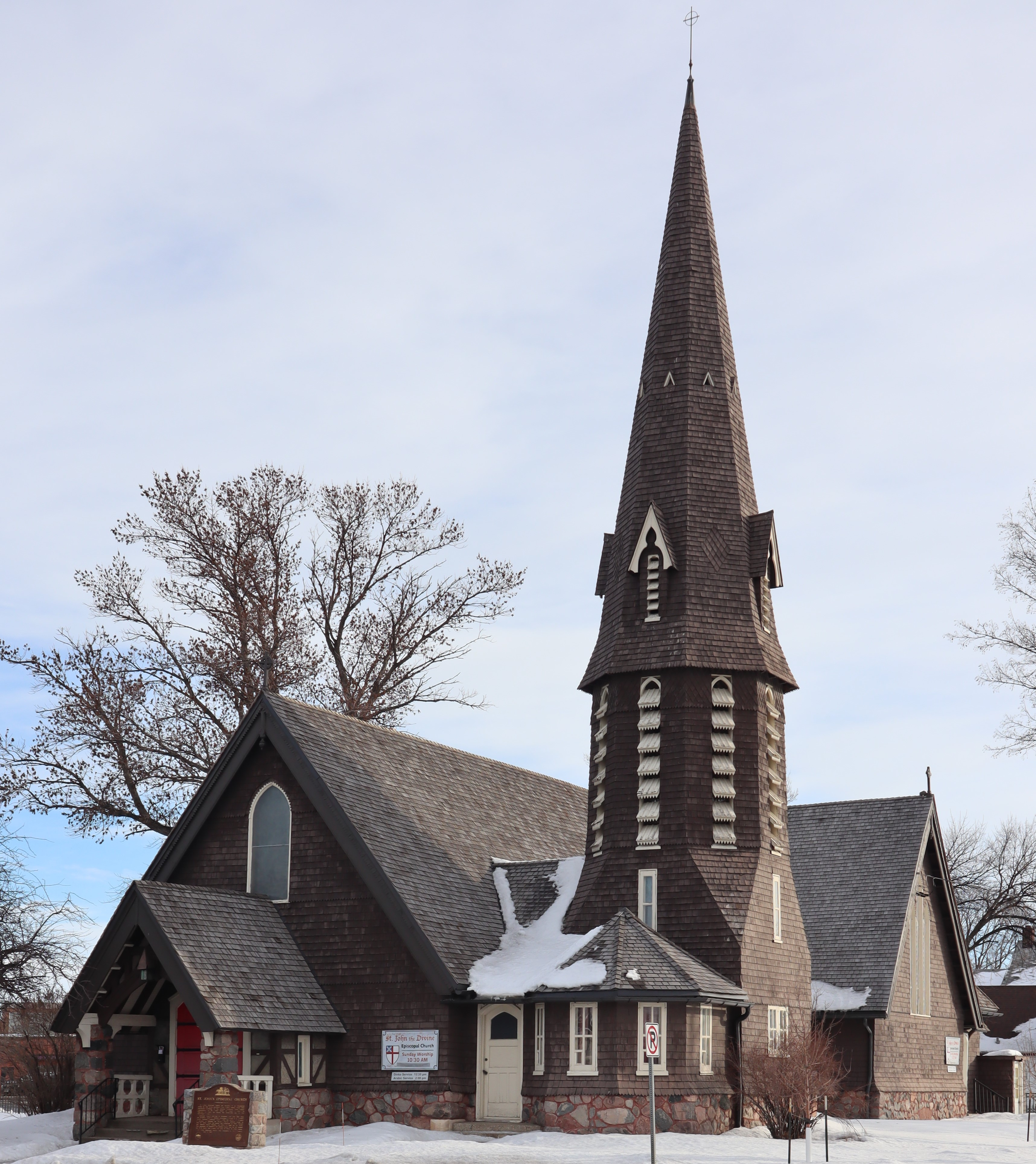
- The church in 2023

- Location within Minnesota Location within the United States
- Location: 120 South 8th Street, Moorhead, Minnesota
- Coordinates: 46°52′22″N 96°46′2″W
- Built: 1898–99
- Architect: Cass Gilbert
- MPS: Clay County MRA
- NRHP reference No.: 80002020
- Added to NRHP: May 7, 1980

St. John the Divine Episcopal Church, also known as St. John's Episcopal Church, is a church in Moorhead, Minnesota, United States. Unlike all other Episcopal churches in Minnesota, it is part of the Episcopal Diocese of North Dakota because of its proximity to Fargo.

In 2015, the church reported 267 members; in 2023, it reported 292 members. No membership statistics were reported in 2024 national parochial reports. Plate and pledge financial support reported by the church in 2024 was $22,084. Average Sunday Attendance (ASA) reported in 2024 was 34 persons. This was a relative decrease from ASA of 76 reported in 2017.

== Building ==
It was built 1898–99 in Shingle Style and is considered Moorhead's leading architectural landmark and one of Cass Gilbert's most interesting churches. It was listed on the National Register of Historic Places in 1980. Its design was the basis for design of St. George's Episcopal Memorial Church in Bismarck, North Dakota, which was completed in 1949 and was listed on the National Register in 2021.
