= Old St Mary's, Walmer =

The Blessed Virgin Mary Church
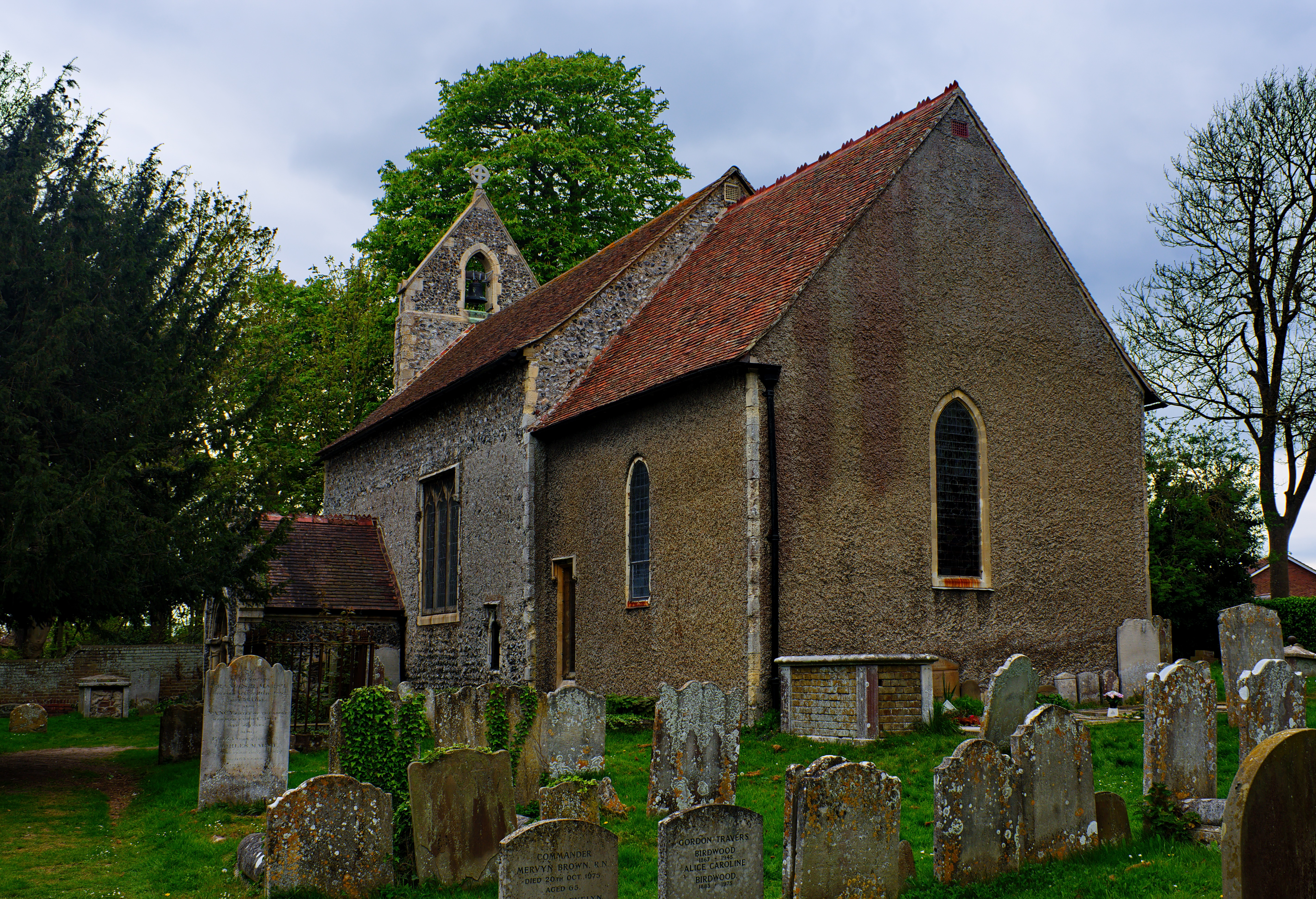
- Old St Mary's Church, Walmer, from the southeast

- Location in Kent
- 51.203°N 1.387°E
- OS grid reference: TR 256 628
- Location: Walmer, Kent
- Country: England
- Denomination: Anglican
- Website: Walmer Parish Churches

Architecture
- Heritage designation: Grade II*
- Designated: 1 June 1949
- Architectural type: Church

Specifications
- Materials: Flint, roughcast

Old St Mary's Church, officially known as The Blessed Virgin Mary Church, is a grade II* listed Anglican church in Upper Walmer, Kent.

== History and architecture ==
The church dates from the early Norman era, being built in 1120 as the chapel to the adjoining Walmer Manor (now in ruins). The church is small, with a nave built of flint, and a roughcast lower chancel. The original Norman entrance door and chancel arch survive, along with two windows on the south side. However, the nave's north wall was removed early in the 19th century to build on an extended and deep north aisle between 1825 and 1826. This north aisle was demolished in 1898, with the building returning to its original size. The south doorway is early Norman, with large shafts and capitals in a scalloped style. The chancel arch shares many decorative motifs with the south doorway, however the inner arch has cushion-shaped capitals as well as extra moulding.

The Duke of Wellington worshipped here whilst staying at Walmer Castle as Lord Warden of the Cinque Ports. His hatchment hangs on the north wall, which was reinstated in its original position during the 1898 north aisle demolition. Old St Mary's had previously been the only parish church in Walmer, however in the 19th century both St Saviour's and New St Mary's were built in the parish; St Mary's Church thus was retitled to Old St Mary's.

== Features ==
The church possesses a plain font with a cone-shaped cover, dated to 1664. There is an indecipherable patched wall painting above the chancel arch. At the east of the chancel is stained glass depicting Our Lady and Child, dated to around 1913. Also present is stained glass from the 20th century depicting Saint Raphael and Saint Elizabeth of Hungary. A tablet monument to William L'Isle and Edmund L'Isle (both died 1637) is installed in the chancel. A large amount of 19th century tablets are also present in the nave, and a monument to Sir Henry Harvey (died 1810) is installed in the centre of the south wall. A 14th-century cusped piscina stands at the north end of the south wall of the nave.

== See also ==
- St. George's Episcopal Memorial Church, a church in the US with a stained glass window containing shards of glass collected from this church when it was damaged in World War II.
