= Robinson, North Dakota =

- City
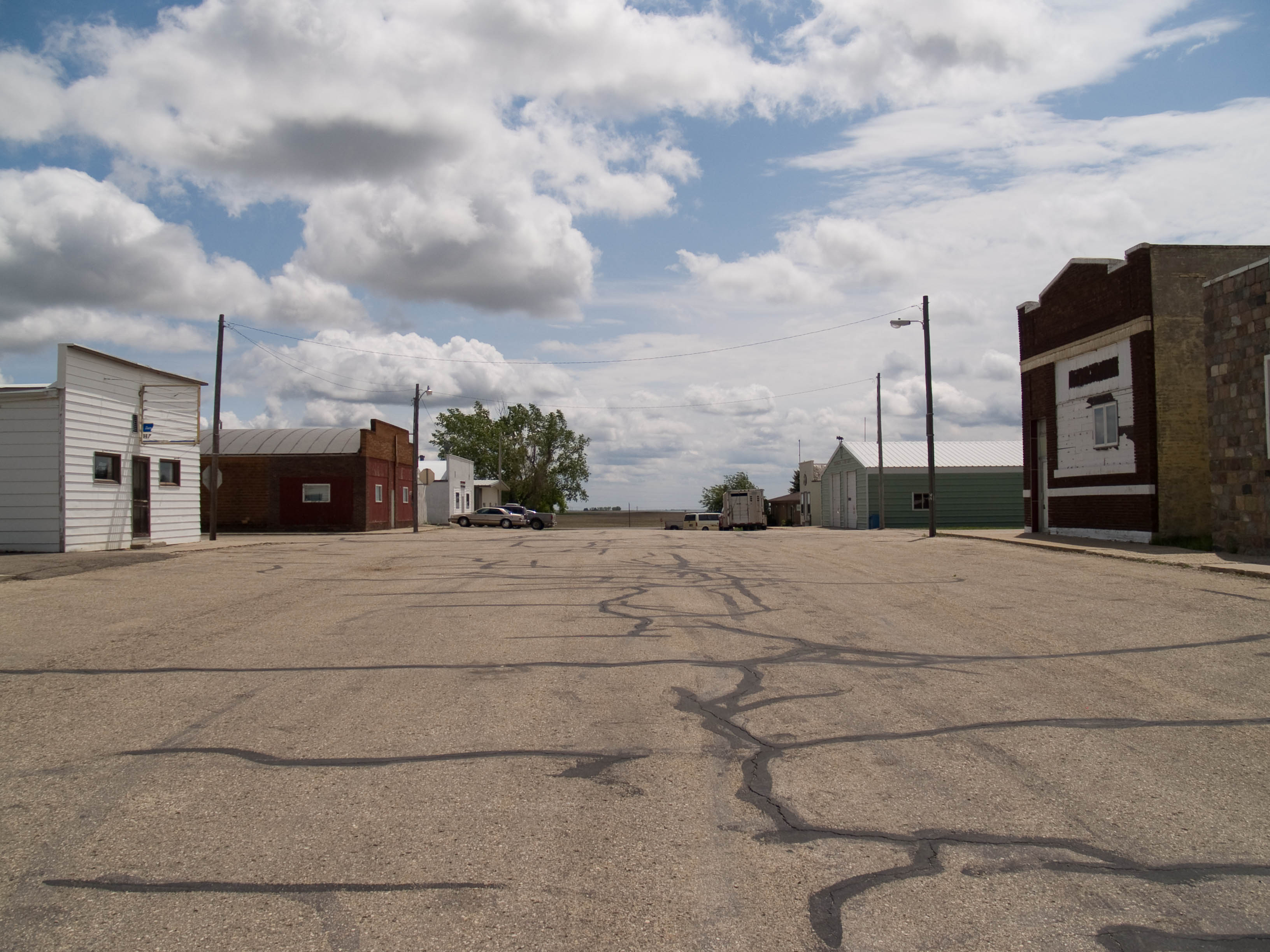
- Street in Robinson

- Location of Robinson, North Dakota
- Coordinates: 47°08′31″N 99°46′53″W
- Country: United States
- State: North Dakota
- County: Kidder

Government
  - Type: City Council
  - Mayor: Del Jasper

Area
  - Total: 0.17 sq mi (0.45 km^{2})
  - Land: 0.17 sq mi (0.45 km^{2})
  - Water: 0 sq mi (0.00 km^{2})
- Elevation: 1,788 ft (545 m)

Population (2020)
  - Total: 36
  - Density: 209.1/sq mi (80.72/km^{2})
- Time zone: UTC-6 (CST)
  - Summer (DST): UTC-5 (CDT)
- ZIP code: 58478
- Area code: 701
- FIPS code: 38-67180
- GNIS feature ID: 1036240

Robinson is a city in Kidder County, North Dakota, United States. The population was 36 at the 2020 census. Robinson was founded in 1911.

== Geography ==
According to the United States Census Bureau, the city has a total area of 0.17 square miles (0.44 km^{2}), all land.

In 2016, Hanson's bar, located in Robinson, registered a trademark in the phrase "Geographical Center of North America", despite Rugby, North Dakota having previously made that claim and establishing a monument to that effect based on a determination made by the United States Geological Survey in 1931.

== Demographics ==
Historical population
Census	Pop.	Note	%±
1930	185		—
1940	160		−13.5%
1950	166		3.8%
1960	155		−6.6%
1970	125		−19.4%
1980	129		3.2%
1990	87		−32.6%
2000	71		−18.4%
2010	37		−47.9%
2020	36		−2.7%
2021 (est.)	31		−13.9%
U.S. Decennial Census; 2020 Census

=== 2010 census ===
As of the census of 2010, there were 37 people, 19 households, and 10 families residing in the city. The population density was 217.6 inhabitants per square mile (84.0/km^{2}). There were 56 housing units at an average density of 329.4 per square mile (127.2/km^{2}). The racial makeup of the city was 100.0% White.

There were 19 households, of which 26.3% had children under the age of 18 living with them, 36.8% were married couples living together, 15.8% had a female householder with no husband present, and 47.4% were non-families. 42.1% of all households were made up of individuals, and 21.1% had someone living alone who was 65 years of age or older. The average household size was 1.95 and the average family size was 2.70.

The median age in the city was 49.3 years. 18.9% of residents were under the age of 18; 5.4% were between the ages of 18 and 24; 16.2% were from 25 to 44; 32.4% were from 45 to 64; and 27% were 65 years of age or older. The gender makeup of the city was 54.1% male and 45.9% female.

=== 2000 census ===
As of the census of 2000, there were 71 people, 40 households, and 21 families residing in the city. The population density was 432.2 inhabitants per square mile (166.9/km^{2}). There were 56 housing units at an average density of 340.9 per square mile (131.6/km^{2}). The racial makeup of the city was 100.00% White.

There were 40 households, out of which 10.0% had children under the age of 18 living with them, 45.0% were married couples living together, 2.5% had a female householder with no husband present, and 47.5% were non-families. 47.5% of all households were made up of individuals, and 30.0% had someone living alone who was 65 years of age or older. The average household size was 1.78 and the average family size was 2.43.

In the city, the population was spread out, with 11.3% under the age of 18, 5.6% from 18 to 24, 14.1% from 25 to 44, 23.9% from 45 to 64, and 45.1% who were 65 years of age or older. The median age was 59 years. For every 100 females, there were 91.9 males. For every 100 females age 18 and over, there were 85.3 males.

The median income for a household in the city was $30,625, and the median income for a family was $33,333. Males had a median income of $25,625 versus $21,875 for females. The per capita income for the city was $15,712. There were 8.3% of families and 7.8% of the population living below the poverty line, including no under eighteens and 20.0% of those over 64.

== See also ==
- Robinson Hall
