= St Saviour's, Walmer =

Anglican church in Walmer, Kent, England

Coordinates: 51°12′49″N 1°24′8″E

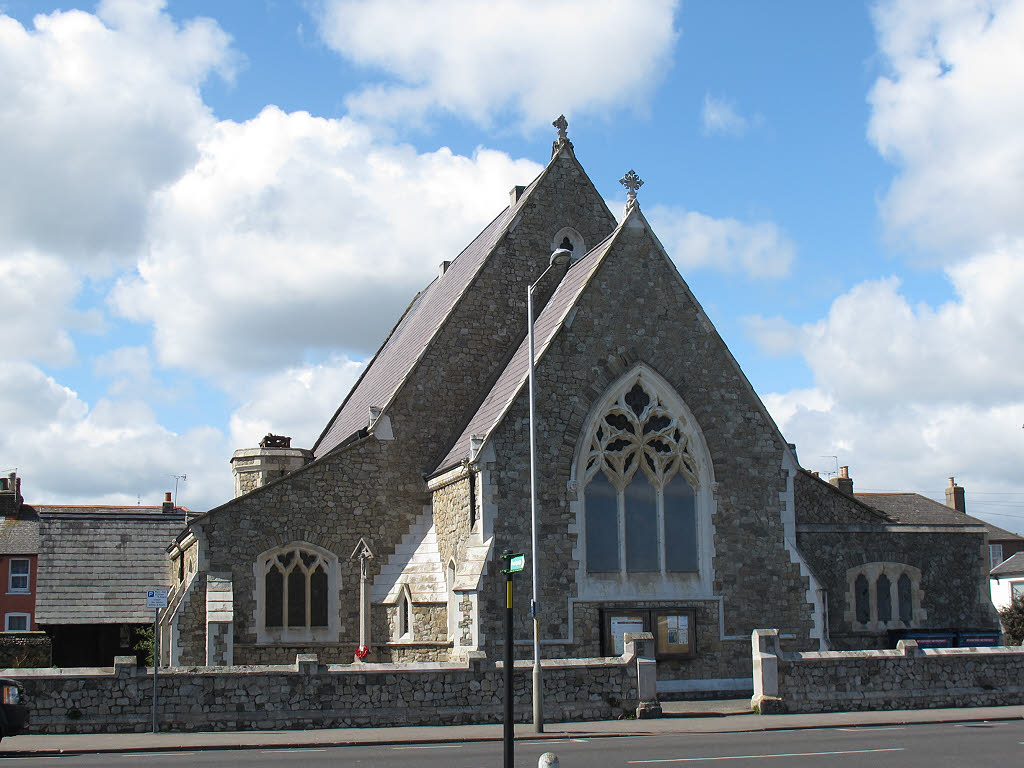
St Saviour's Church, Walmer, 2012

St Saviour's is a church on the seafront of Walmer, Kent, United Kingdom.

== History ==
The foundation stone of St Saviour's, Walmer, was laid on 15 August 1848 by Mrs J.T. Bridges. "A vast concourse of people assembled, which, together with the large attendance of carriages, and the brilliancy of the summer's sun, made it quite a gay day. The church was consecrated on 2 July 1849 by the Archbishop of Canterbury who received luncheon on arrival. However at 5 o'clock at the Naval Hospital, (Note: This was the Royal Naval Hospital at Deal, Kent (now gone)) between four and five hundred of the local poor were fed with roast beef and plum pudding, and entertained by a German brass band. The local benefactor J.T. Bridges paid for the feast for the poor, and he had paid for much of the cost of the church building. At this meal for the poor:

The Archbishop, with his usual condescension, most kindly consented to be present on this festive occasion, and added not a little to the interest which generally obtained, by saying grace at the different tables, and by addressing some most kind and appropriate observations to the parties assembled, which, we trust, will be long remembered ... On leaving the hospital, the Archbishop was loudly cheered by the assembled guests, who seemed deeply impressed by his kind counsels.

The building was designed by I. Johnson FSA of Adelphi, and constructed by William Denne. It is dedicated to no saint, but to the Holy Saviour (i.e. to Christ directly). It was built in 1848, in the Neo-Gothic architectural style, as a chapel of ease for the town's boatmen (who, in the days of sail, took supplies out to vessels in the Downs) and to take the pressure off Old St Mary's (previously the parish's only church).

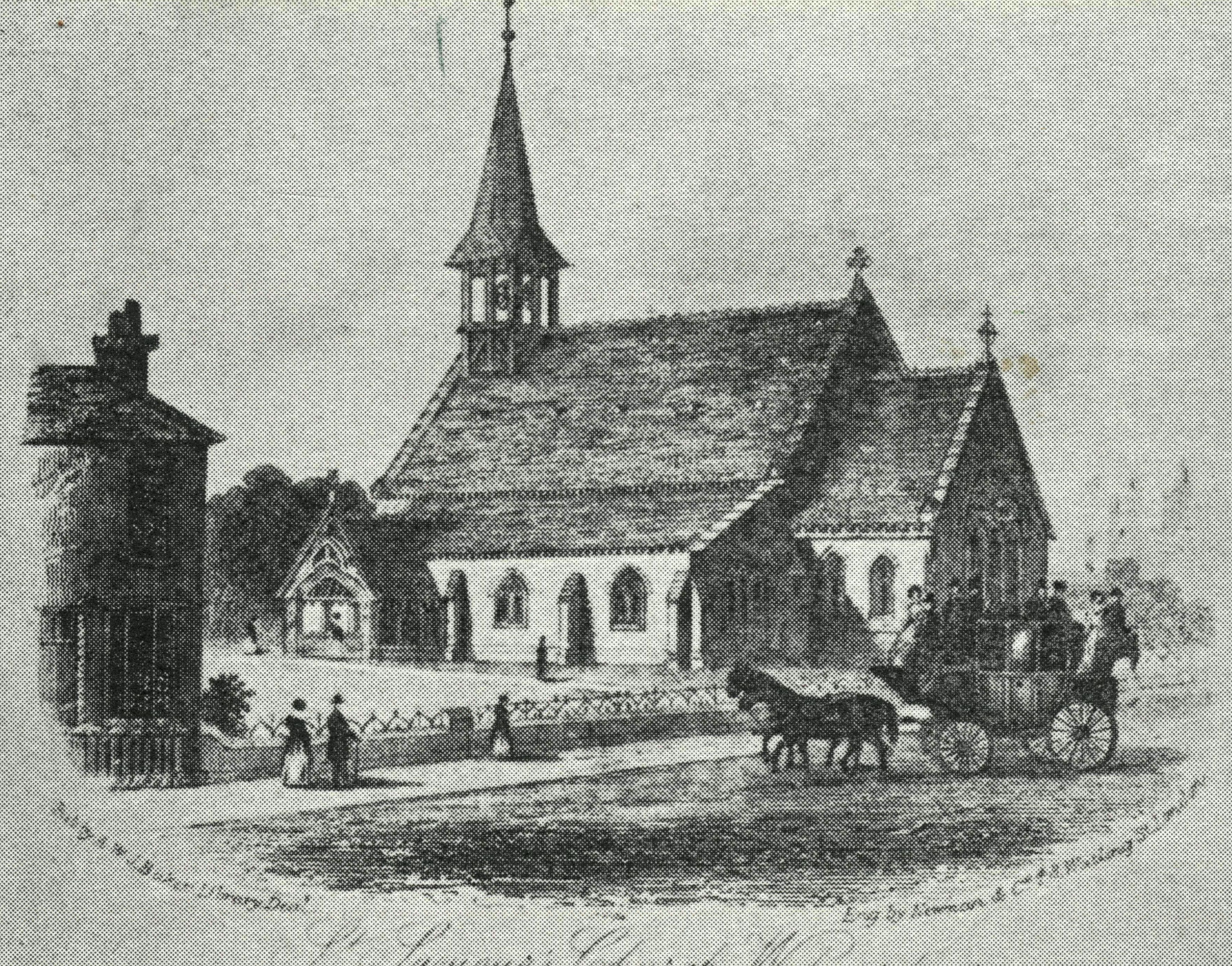
Steeple with open bellchamber, before World War I

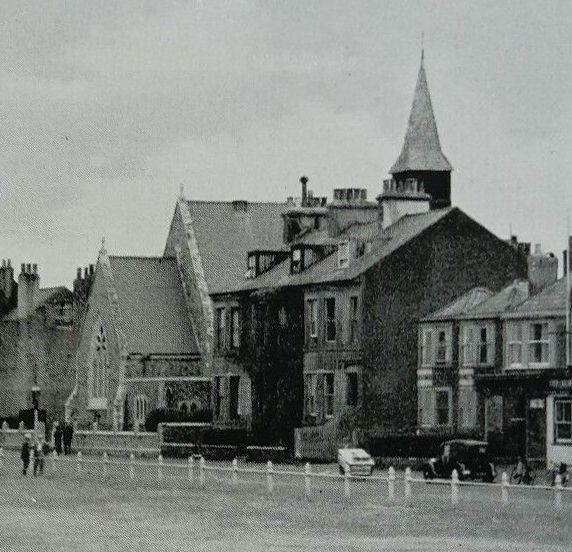
Steeple with enclosed bell chamber, 1920s

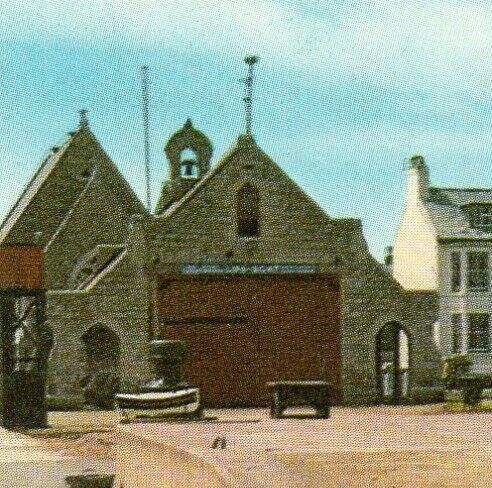
St Saviour's (left) with no steeple, 1940s

When the Walmer Lifeboat House was built opposite it around 23 years later, it was built in a similar Neo-Gothic style.

== See also ==
- St. George's Episcopal Memorial Church, a church in the US with a stained glass window containing shards of glass collected from this church when it was damaged in World War II.
