= Robinson Hall =

- U.S. National Register of Historic Places
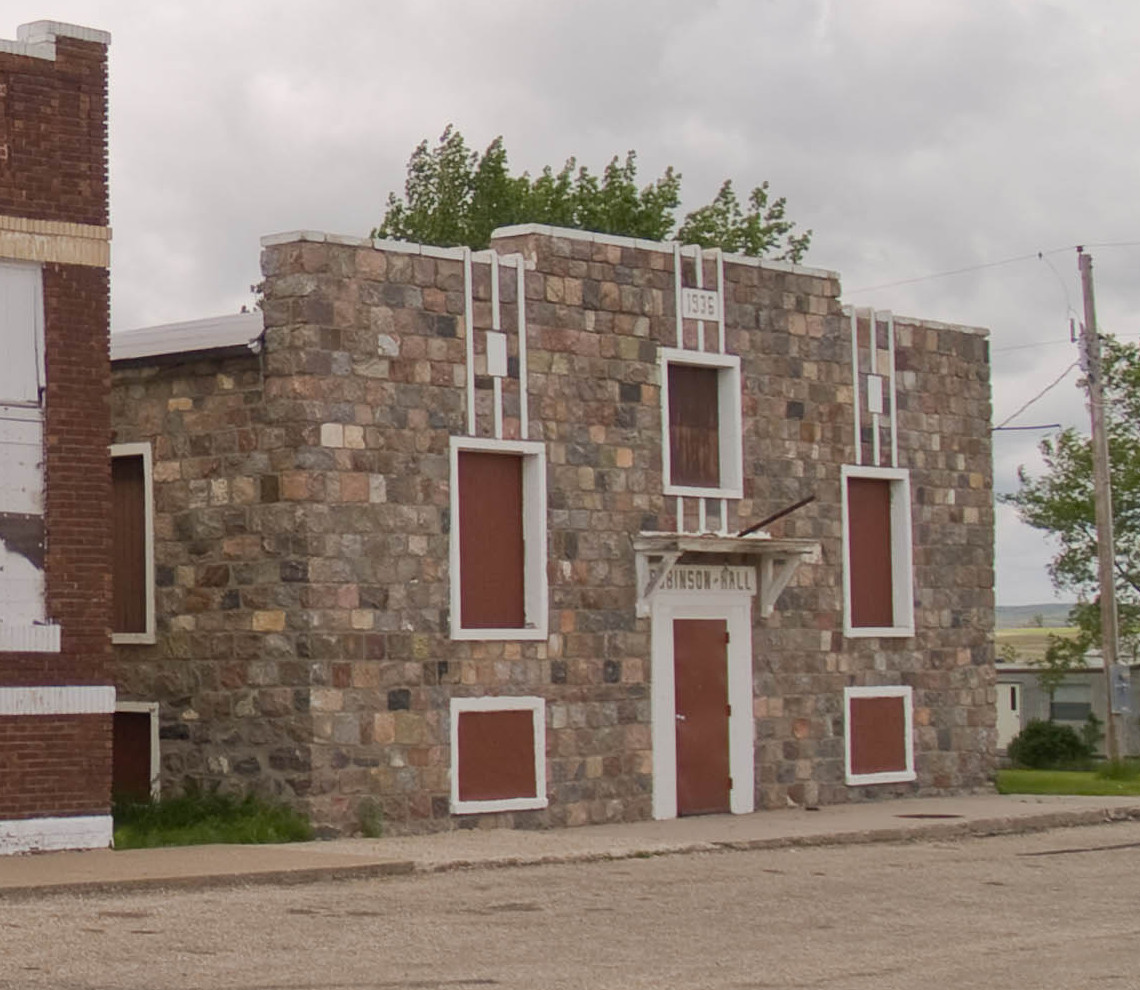
- Building in 2008

- Location within North Dakota Location within the United States
- Location: 118 Main St., Robinson, North Dakota
- Coordinates: 47°08′40″N 99°46′52″W
- Architect: Herman M. Leonhard
- NRHP reference No.: 100002253
- Added to NRHP: March 26, 2018

Robinson Hall, at 118 Main St. in Robinson, North Dakota, was listed on the National Register of Historic Places in 2018.

It is the town hall of Robinson. The building was built in 1935 as a Works Progress Administration project.

It was listed in conjunction with a study of historic resources titled "Federal Relief Construction in North Dakota, 1931-1943, MPS".

Robinson Hall is coincidentally also the name of an animal sciences program building built in 1976 on the North Dakota State University campus in Fargo, named after Dr. John Wade Robinson, "a highly influential and respected North Dakota veterinarian."
