= Walmer =

Town in Kent, England

Coordinates: 51.2043°N 1.3985°E

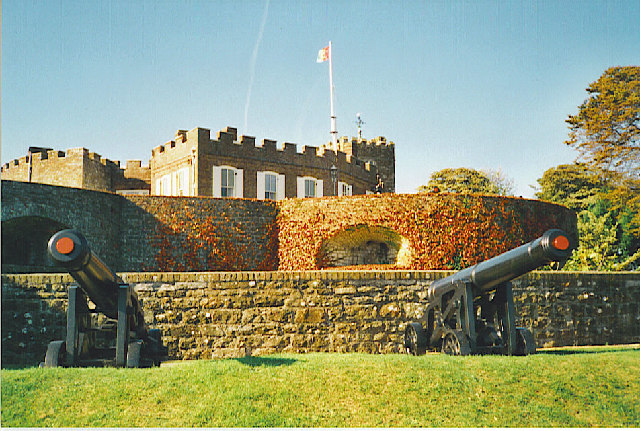
- Walmer Castle

- Location within Kent
- Population: 7,842 (2021 census)
- OS grid reference: TR374505
- Civil parish: Walmer
- District: Dover
- Shire county: Kent
- Region: South East
- Country: England
- Sovereign state: United Kingdom
- Post town: Deal
- Postcode district: CT14
- Dialling code: 01304
- Police: Kent
- Fire: Kent
- Ambulance: South East Coast
- UK Parliament: Dover & Deal

Walmer is a town in the district of Dover, Kent, in England. Located on the coast, the parish of Walmer is six miles (ten kilometres) southeast of Sandwich, Kent. The town's coastline and castle are popular amongst tourists. It has a population of 6,693 (2001), increasing to 8,178 at the 2011 Census.

Walmer is closely associated with its adjoining neighbour, the town of Deal - sharing many amenities and services and benefiting from Deal's High Street shopping area.

Walmer railway station is on the Kent Coast Line.

== History ==
=== Julius Caesar ===
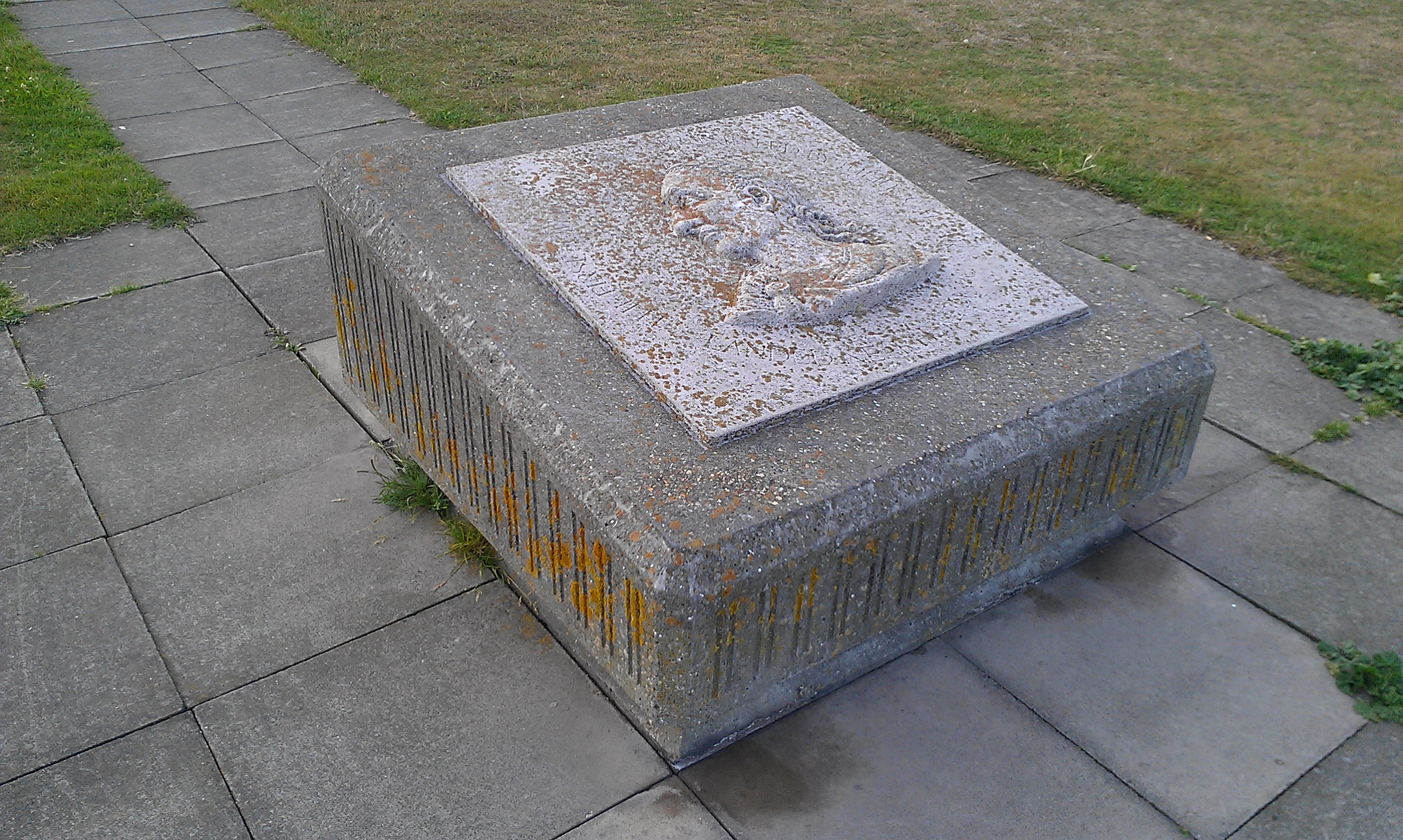
A monument to the Roman conquest of Britain, in Walmer

Julius Caesar reputedly landed on the beach here in 55 BC and 54 BC. It is only one possible landing place, proposed judging from the distances given in his account of the landings in his Gallic Wars. In the 19th century it was thought that he had landed by Deal Castle – hence a house there with SPQR emblazoned on its gate – but in 1907 the landing point has been proposed to be one-half mile (800 metres) further south, beyond the lifeboat station, and marked by a concrete memorial. However, new archaeological excavations performed since 2015 suggest instead that the landing occurred at Ebbsfleet, at the head of Pegwell Bay, in Thanet, further north along the Kent coast.

=== Medieval ===
The coastal confederation of Cinque Ports during its mediæval period consisted of a confederation of 42 towns and villages in all. This includes Walmer, as a 'Limb' of Sandwich, Kent.

=== Walmer Castle ===
Walmer Castle and its formal gardens are an attraction for visitors. The official residence of Lord Warden of the Cinque Ports since the 18th Century, the building is now an English Heritage property. Famous Lords Warden have included Queen Elizabeth the Queen Mother, Sir Winston Churchill, William Pitt the Younger (whose niece Lady Hester Stanhope first created the gardens), and the Duke of Wellington (of the Battle of Waterloo fame). Wellington lived there for 23 years and the castle houses not only a collection of Wellington memorabilia but also the room in which he died.

The Castle was built in 1540 as one of three on this part of the Kent coast by orders of Henry VIII. The others were nearby at Deal (southern Deal) and Sandown (north Deal) - the Deal one survives, the Sandown one has been lost to coastal erosion.

=== Walmer Aerodrome ===
Walmer Aerodrome was a First World War airfield established by the Royal Naval Air Service in 1917 on Hawkshill Down near Walmer, Kent. Its primary role was to provide air defence during both World Wars. The station operated fighter aircraft including Sopwith Camels during the First World War, and accommodated both British and Allied pilots.

The last aeroplanes left the aerodrome in 1919, and the site later reopened during the Second World War for radar tracking. After 1945 the land returned to agricultural use, though memorials and information boards mark its historical significance.

=== Walmer Brewery (1816–1978) ===
Brewing in Walmer is thought to date back to at least the Tudor period, but the best-known brewery began in 1816 when Edmund Thompson acquired a small brewery on Dover Road, just south of old Walmer village. He operated it as Thompson & Sons until 1867, when the business was sold to John Matthews, who expanded and modernised the site while retaining the Thompson name.

By the late nineteenth century the brewery included maltings, a brewhouse, a bottling plant, stables and workers’ cottages, making it a significant local employer. In the 1950s it was taken over by Charringtons, after which production declined and the site was used mainly for bottling and distribution. The brewery closed in 1972 and was demolished in 1978 to make way for the Downlands housing development. The name of the Thompson’s Bell public house commemorates the brewery’s former bell tower, although it is unclear whether the original bell was ever relocated to the pub, and some reports even suggest the bell may have been damaged in the move and might no longer be on site.

== Governance ==
An electoral ward in the same name exists. The population of this ward at the 2011 census was 7,434.

== Churches ==
- Blessed Mary of Walmer (The Old Church) – (Church of England)
- St Saviour's Church, Walmer – (Church of England)
- St Mary's Church, Walmer – (Church of England)

== People from Walmer ==
People born in Walmer include:

- John Hassall (illustrator)
- Beth Rogan, (born Jenifer Puckle), 1931.
- Roy Stevens, cricketer
- Dornford Yates

People who died in Walmer include:

- Charles Hawtrey (1914–1988), comedy actor and musician. He died at Winthorpe Lodge Nursing Home.
- Joseph Lister, 1st Baron Lister
- Richard Lee, Royal Navy Officer
- Arthur Wellesley, 1st Duke of Wellington
