= Philip Twysden =

18th-century Anglican bishop

The Right Reverend Philip Twysden
- Lord Bishop of Raphoe
- Church: Church of Ireland
- Province: Armagh
- Diocese: Raphoe
- In office: 1747–1752
- Predecessor: William Barnard
- Successor: Robert Downes

Orders
- Consecration: 29 March 1747 by George Stone

Personal details
- Born: 7 September 1713 Kent
- Died: 2 November 1752 (aged 39) London
- Buried: St Michael's Church, East Peckham
- Denomination: Anglican
- Parents: Sir William Twysden, 5th Baronet, and Jane Twisden
- Spouse: (1) Mary Purcell (2) Frances Carter
- Children: 2, including Frances, Countess of Jersey
- Education: University College, Oxford

Philip Twysden (1713–1752), was an Anglican clergyman who served in the Church of Ireland as Lord Bishop of Raphoe from 1747 to 1752. The circumstances of his death later became the subject of scandalous rumour.

== Early life and family ==
He was born in Kent, south-east England, in 1713, the third son of Sir William Twysden, 5th Baronet of Roydon Hall, East Peckham, Kent, by his wife (and distant cousin) Jane Twisden.

He studied at University College, Oxford, from 1732. He was awarded a Master of Arts degree, and the honorary degree of Doctor of Civil Law in 1745.

He married twice: firstly to Mary Purcell (died 1743), and secondly to Frances Carter, daughter of The Rt Hon. Thomas Carter, Master of the Rolls in Ireland. After Bishop Twysden's death, she married her cousin, General James Johnston.

By his second wife, he had two children: Mary (died in infancy) and a posthumous daughter called Frances (1753–1821). Frances, later Countess of Jersey, was one of the many mistresses of King George IV when he was Prince of Wales. Through Frances, they are ancestors of Diana, Princess of Wales, and of her sons, Princes William, the Prince of Wales, and Harry, Duke of Sussex.

== Ecclesiastical career ==
He was ordained a priest in the Church of England. He was instituted in 1738 as rector of Eard and in 1745, for a short time, served as the rector of Eastling in Kent. He accompanied The 4th Earl of Chesterfield to Dublin as his chaplain, upon the Earl's appointment as Lord Lieutenant of Ireland.

Twysden was nominated to the Bishopric of Raphoe in Ulster on 3 March 1746 and was consecrated by the Lord Archbishop of Dublin, assisted by the bishops of Derry and Clonfert, at St Michan's Church, Dublin, on 29 March 1747.

== Death ==
Bishop Twysden died on 2 November 1752 at home in Jermyn Street, St James's, London. However, writing almost a century later, Henry Cotton incorrectly thought he died at Roydon Hall, East Peckham, his father's country house. Twysden was buried in the south chancel of St Michael's Church, East Peckham, under a plain stone with no inscription.

A story grew up that, having been made bankrupt, he was shot while attempting to rob a stagecoach. The location of his alleged attempted career as a highwayman was either Hounslow Heath (west of London) or Wrotham Heath in Kent.

== Notes ==
Church of Ireland titles
Preceded by William Barnard	Lord Bishop of Raphoe; 1747–1752	Succeeded by Robert Downes
