= List of places of worship in Tonbridge and Malling =

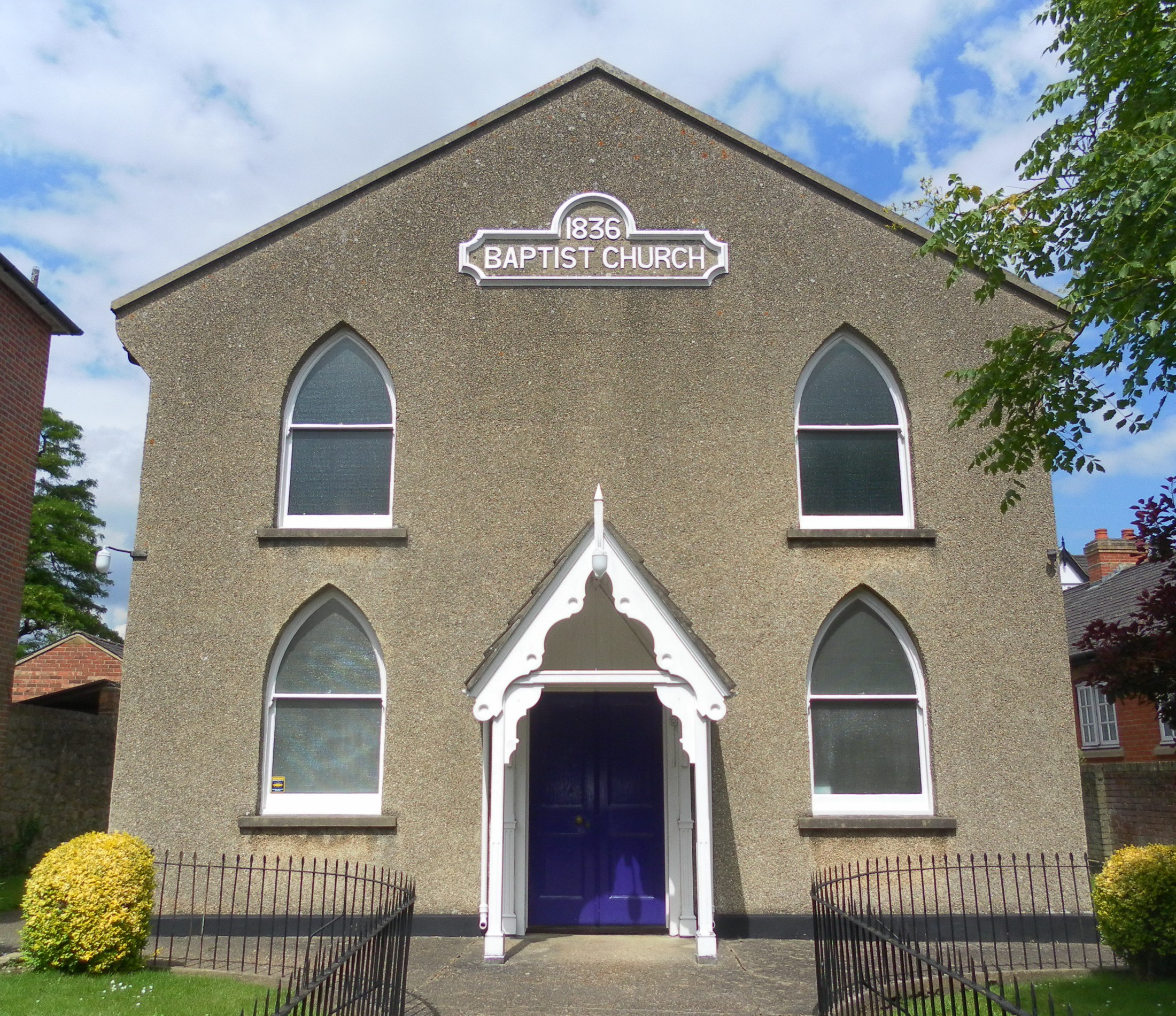
West Malling Free Church, one of many Nonconformist chapels in the borough of Tonbridge and Malling, has served Baptists since 1836.

The borough of Tonbridge and Malling, one of 13 local government districts in the English county of Kent, has more than 80 current and former places of worship. Many are in the ancient town of Tonbridge, the largest centre of population in the mostly rural area, but many of the surrounding villages and hamlets have their own places of worship—including ancient Anglican parish churches, Nonconformist chapels and modern buildings serving a wide variety of Christian denominations. 63 places of worship are in use in the borough, and a further 21 former churches and chapels no longer hold religious services but survive in alternative uses.

The majority of Tonbridge and Malling's residents identify themselves as Christian. The borough has nearly 40 Anglican churches serving the Church of England, the country's Established Church. Buildings of many styles and sizes are used for Anglican worship: from the tiny tin tabernacles at Hadlow Stair and Golden Green to the expansive stone-built edifices at East Malling and Aylesford, and from Saxon- and Norman-era churches (as at Snodland and Wouldham) to 20th-century buildings in wayside hamlets and on suburban housing estates. Non-Anglican worshippers are accommodated in a variety of mostly 19th- and 20th-century chapels and meeting rooms: Baptists, Methodists and Roman Catholics each have several churches, and smaller religious groups such as Open Brethren and Jehovah's Witnesses can also be found in the borough.

English Heritage has awarded listed status to 37 places of worship in Tonbridge and Malling borough. A building is defined as "listed" when it is placed on a statutory register of buildings of "special architectural or historic interest" in accordance with the Planning (Listed Buildings and Conservation Areas) Act 1990. The Department for Culture, Media and Sport, a Government department, is responsible for this; English Heritage, a non-departmental public body, acts as an agency of the department to administer the process and advise the department on relevant issues. There are three grades of listing status. Grade I, the highest, is defined as being of "exceptional interest"; Grade II* is used for "particularly important buildings of more than special interest"; and Grade II, the lowest, is used for buildings of "special interest". As of February 2001, there were 38 Grade I-listed buildings, 74 with Grade II* status and 1,179 Grade II-listed buildings in the borough of Tonbridge and Malling.

== Overview of the borough and its places of worship ==
Tonbridge and Malling is situated in the west of Kent.

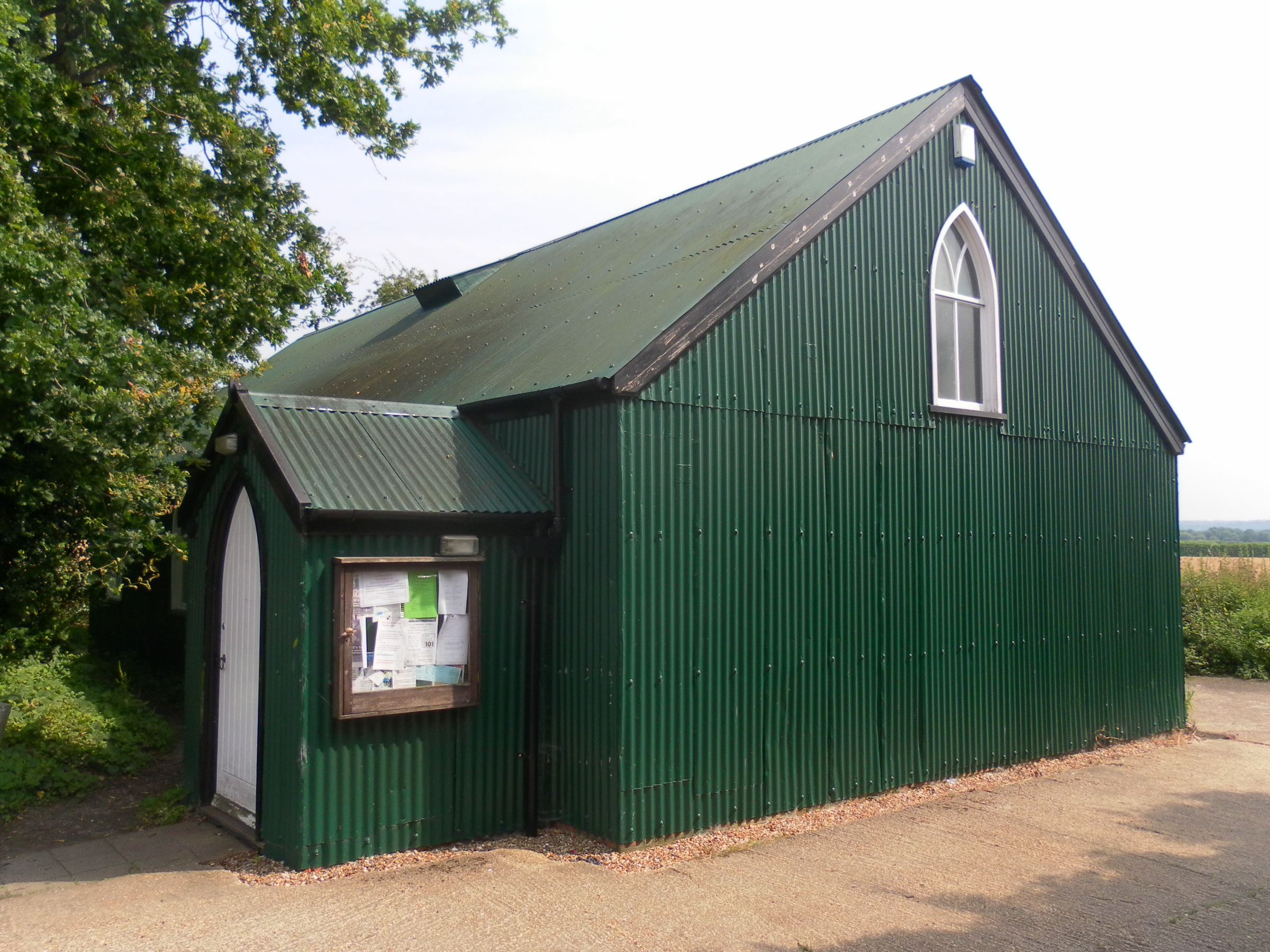
The Golden Green Mission Church, a 100-year-old tin tabernacle, is still in religious use.

Tonbridge and Malling borough covers 50,440 acres (20,410 ha) of the Kentish Weald in the west of Kent, England's southeasternmost county. Clockwise from the north, it shares borders with the borough of Gravesham, the city and unitary authority of Medway, the boroughs of Maidstone and Tunbridge Wells and the district of Sevenoaks, all of which are in Kent.

Like many Kentish towns, Tonbridge developed along a main road at a river crossing and grew rapidly in the 19th century, but its ancient origins are visible in its castle and the nearby parish church dedicated to Saints Peter and Paul. Victorian growth stimulated by the opening of several railway lines encouraged more Anglican churches to be built: prolific ecclesiastical architect Ewan Christian provided three new churches, all of which remain open. One—St John the Evangelist's Church (1841) in the outlying village of Hildenborough, then part of the 10 by 2 1/2 miles (16.1 km × 4.0 km) parish of St Peter and St Paul—was his first church, and Christian has been praised for his assured handling of Gothic Revival architectural forms. As well as the new St Saviour's and St Stephen's churches, three unparished mission churches were provided for its growing population and were served from them. Two survive, but neither are in religious use and the St Stephen's Mission at Lower Haysden is in ruinous condition. It was a tin tabernacle—a distinctive and cheap type of church building which could be bought from a catalogue and erected quickly where needed. The heyday of tin tabernacles was the turn of the 20th century, and two green-painted examples survive in religious use in the borough: the Golden Green Mission Church (1914) serves a hamlet near Hadlow and has listed building status, and St Andrew's Church a few miles away serves the Hadlow Stair area of Tonbridge.

The 19th-century Anglican churchbuilding boom in Tonbridge was also prompted by the rise in popularity of Protestant Nonconformist worship, legal restrictions on which had been relaxed steadily since the 17th century. Independents founded a chapel in the town in 1791, and by the 1850s there were congregations of Wesleyan Methodists, Congregationalists, Strict Baptists, Independent Calvinistic Baptists and the United Methodist Free Church. In the 20th century, places of worship have been provided for Evangelical, Pentecostal and Brethren worshippers, and the non-denominational River Church was established in 1998 and moved into the new River Centre building next to the Medway in 2003. Long-established Nonconformist chapels elsewhere in the borough include a Reformed Baptist chapel at Ryarsh, an Evangelical Free church at Dunk's Green, a Brethren Gospel Hall in Hildenborough, and Strict Baptist, Salvation Army and Methodist churches in East Peckham. Methodism in particular has thrived in Kent for many years, and several small rural chapels survive in the borough—although postwar decline has resulted in several closures, including the Grade II-listed chapels at Aylesford and Ightham. At Burham, the Methodist chapel took in Anglicans when their 19th-century church was demolished because of structural problems, and continues to serve both denominations. As Roman Catholic worship became more prevalent in the 19th century—again after legal restrictions were removed—churches were built at Tonbridge and West Malling (now replaced by a postwar building), and in the 20th century a badminton hall and a disused Gospel Hall were bought and turned into churches in Borough Green and Hadlow respectively.

Away from Tonbridge town, much of the district is rural and there are many ancient Anglican churches. Some villages, such as Addington, Trottiscliffe and Offham, are a long way from their churches; at East Peckham, the centre of population moved and the distance was so great that St Michael's Church became redundant and a new building was provided close to the village. The small town of Snodland continues to support two active Anglican churches, but Roman Catholic, Methodist, United Reformed and Swedenborgian churches have all closed since the 1970s. The area around the ancient village of Larkfield has developed into a large residential and industrial suburb encompassing New Hythe, Leybourne and Lunsford Park; two Anglican churches already existed to serve the conurbation, but a new Methodist church was provided in 1964, superseding one in nearby East Malling.

== Religious affiliation ==
According to the United Kingdom Census 2001, 107,561 people lived in the borough of Tonbridge and Malling. Of these, 76.13% identified themselves as Christian, 0.3% were Muslim, 0.16% were Hindu, 0.15% were Buddhist, 0.12% were Jewish, 0.07% were Sikh, 0.24% followed another religion, 15.01% claimed no religious affiliation and 7.83% did not state their religion. The proportion of Christians was much higher than the 71.74% in England as a whole, and the proportion of people with no religious affiliation was slightly higher than the national average of 14.59%. Adherents of Islam, Hinduism, Judaism and Sikhism and Buddhism were much less prevalent in the borough than in England overall: in 2001, 3.1% of people in England were Muslim, 1.11% were Hindu, 0.67% were Sikh, 0.52% were Jewish and 0.28% were Buddhist. The proportion of people who followed religions not mentioned in the Census was slightly lower than the national figure of 0.29%.

== Administration ==
=== Anglican churches ===
All of Tonbridge and Malling borough's Anglican churches are administered by the Diocese of Rochester, the seat of which is Rochester Cathedral. The diocese has three archdeaconries; these are subdivided into deaneries which each cover a group of churches. The Archdeaconry of Rochester administers three churches in the borough: Snodland's two churches are in the Cobham Deanery, and the chapel at Blue Bell Hill Village is part of the Rochester Deanery. The Archdeaconry of Tonbridge covers the borough's 35 other Anglican churches. The Deanery of Malling administers Addington, Aylesford, Birling, Burham, Ditton, East Malling, Larkfield, Leybourne, Mereworth, Offham, Ryarsh, Trottiscliffe, Wateringbury, West Peckham and Wouldham churches, and both the parish church and the Pilsdon Community Barn Chapel at West Malling. East Peckham, Golden Green and Hadlow churches are part of the Deanery of Paddock Wood. The Deanery of Shoreham is responsible for Borough Green, Fairseat, Ightham, Platt, Plaxtol, Shipbourne, Stansted and Wrotham. The six churches in Tonbridge—St Peter and St Paul's, St Stephen's, St Saviour's, St Eanswythe's Mission, St Philip's at Cage Green and St Andrew's at Hadlow Stair—are within the Deanery of Tonbridge, as is St John the Evangelist's Church at Hildenborough.

=== Roman Catholic churches ===
The borough's four Roman Catholic churches are at Borough Green, Hadlow, Tonbridge and West Malling. All are in the Archdiocese of Southwark, whose seat is St George's Cathedral in Southwark, southeast London. The archdiocese has 20 deaneries, of which seven are in Kent. The Tunbridge Wells Deanery administers three of the churches: Corpus Christi at Tonbridge and its dependent chapel (St Peter's) at Hadlow, and St Joseph's at Borough Green in the four-church Catholic parish of Sevenoaks. St Thomas More's Church at West Malling is in the Maidstone Deanery.

=== Other denominations ===
About 150 Baptist churches in southeast England are part of the South Eastern Baptist Association, which arranges its member congregations into geographical networks. Tonbridge Baptist Church is in the Tonbridge Network, and the North Kent Network administers Walderslade Baptist Church and West Malling Free Church. Providence Strict Baptist Chapel at East Peckham is affiliated with the Gospel Standard movement. Borough Green Baptist Church and Pembury Road (formerly Zion) Baptist Chapel in Tonbridge have a Reformed Baptist character and belong to GraceNet UK, an association of Reformed Evangelical Christian churches and organisations, as does Ryarsh Baptist Chapel.

As of 2010, East Peckham and Tonbridge Methodist Churches were part of the Tonbridge Methodist Circuit within that denomination's South East District. The churches at Burham (joint Anglican and Methodist), Eccles, Larkfield, Offham and Snodland (joint United Reformed and Methodist, and now closed) were in the Maidstone Circuit.

Tonbridge Evangelical Free Church is a member of the Fellowship of Independent Evangelical Churches (FIEC), a pastoral and administrative network of about 500 churches with an evangelical outlook. It is also a partner church of Affinity (formerly the British Evangelical Council)—a network of conservative Evangelical congregations throughout Great Britain. Borough Green Baptist Church is also affiliated with this group.

Christ Church United Reformed Church in Tonbridge is a member of that denomination's Southern Synod.

== Open places of worship ==
Open places of worship
Name	Image	Location	Denomination/ Affiliation	Grade	Notes	Refs
St Margaret's Church		Addington; 51.3050°N 0.3712°E	Anglican	I	An early Norman (c. 1100) nave and chancel with 14th- and 15th-century additions are dominated by the "beacon-like" west tower of the 1470s, which rises in three stages and has a stair turret and buttresses. The church was restored in 1858.	
St Peter and St Paul's Church		Aylesford; 51.3041°N 0.4795°E	Anglican	I	Almost entirely Norman in appearance, despite an expensive restoration in 1878, this hilltop church overlooks the village and river. The interior has Decorated and Perpendicular Gothic structural features and sumptuous monuments from the late medieval era.	
All Saints Church		Birling; 51.3197°N 0.4098°E	Anglican	I	The church was built between the 14th and the 16th centuries, mostly in the Perpendicular Gothic style. The wide 16th-century chancel has "eccentrically distributed" lancet windows, and the large battlemented tower is heavily buttressed.	
St Alban's Church		Blue Bell Hill; 51.3341°N 0.5085°E	Anglican	–	This small chapel dates from 1931 and was originally served from Aylesford parish church. Since 1997 it has been part of the parish of Holy Trinity South Chatham (a three-church parish incorporating Anglican and Methodist places of worship).	
Church of the Good Shepherd		Borough Green; 51.2913°N 0.3039°E	Anglican	–	Built of brick in 1905, this church was designed by architects Monkton and Gillespie.	
Borough Green Baptist Church		Borough Green; 51.2916°N 0.3055°E	Baptist	–	The church, which has a Reformed Baptist character, was founded and appointed its first pastor in 1809. Eight years later, the present chapel was built at the village crossroads. Extensions were built in 1857, 1890 and 2002 to modernise the building and accommodate its growing congregation.	
St Joseph's Chapel		Borough Green; 51.2928°N 0.3056°E	Roman Catholic	–	The simple building was erected in 1927 as a badminton hall. It had many other community uses over the next 30 years until it was bought by the Catholic Church in 1957 and converted into a small, simple chapel served from Sevenoaks. Major renovations have since been carried out.	
The Church in Burham		Burham; 51.3321°N 0.4771°E	Anglican/Methodist	–	This Wesleyan Methodist church is now shared by Anglicans: the new St Mary's Church (1881), replacing its redundant predecessor, was demolished in 1979. The Gothic Revival, lancet-windowed chapel was built of stock brick in 1847 and extended in 1873.	
St Philip's Church		Cage Green, Tonbridge; 51.2083°N 0.2854°E	Anglican	–	Cage Green, a northern suburb of Tonbridge, grew rapidly in the 1950s. The local council offered a plot of land for a church, and a disused wooden school building was moved there in 1956 from another site in the town. Served from St Peter and St Paul's Church, it was used until 1969, when a permanent brick building was erected. This was dedicated in April 1970.	
Tonbridge Pentecostal Church		Cage Green, Tonbridge; 51.2073°N 0.2773°E	Assemblies of God	–	This Pentecostal denomination has had a presence in Tonbridge since 1929, when a church was planted out of the Tunbridge Wells Assemblies of God church. The congregation has moved from Avebury Avenue to a shopping centre, a different building in Avebury Avenue and now to another location on Shipbourne Road.	
St Peter ad Vincula Church		Ditton; 51.2959°N 0.4511°E	Anglican	II*	George Gilbert Scott restoration in 1860 took out the chancel arch, but the Norman appearance of this small church remains. Work from the 14th and 15th centuries includes large windows in the nave and the two-stage Perpendicular Gothic tower at the west end, which lacks buttresses.	
Dunk's Green Evangelical Free Church		Dunk's Green, Plaxtol; 51.2532°N 0.3065°E	Evangelical	–	Registered for worship under its present name in February 1972, this Kentish Ragstone and brick chapel with lancet windows and a porch was built for Baptists in 1838. It later passed to the Congregational Church and was registered for that denomination (under the name Congregational Mission Church) from November 1880 until November 1971. The schoolroom at the rear dates from 1886.	
St James the Great's Church		East Malling; 51.2874°N 0.4407°E	Anglican	I	Late Perpendicular Gothic in style on the outside, with its tower and chancel lined with battlements, this church is much older: Norman windows, doorways and materials (including tufa limestone and tiles) are visible throughout. The side aisles may originally have been transepts that were extended to form aisles in the 14th century.	
Holy Trinity Church		East Peckham; 51.2172°N 0.3816°E	Anglican	II	The firm of Whichcord and Walker provided this Early English/Decorated Gothic Revival church near the centre of the village to supersede the distant St Michael's Church. The stone building has a bellcote and a multi-sided apse. Work to the value of £800 was carried out in 1892, and a vestry was added in 1900.	
Providence Strict Baptist Chapel		East Peckham; 51.2129°N 0.3874°E	Baptist	–	Strict Baptists have worshipped at this chapel since 1857. The exterior is now covered with roughcast, but the walls are of brick. Pointed-arched windows light the interior and flank a steep-roofed entrance porch.	
East Peckham Methodist Church		East Peckham; 51.2128°N 0.3858°E	Methodist	–	Designed by S.W. Haughton of East Grinstead and built by Tonbridge man C.J. Jones, this chapel of 1886–87 replaced a smaller building of 1823. Red and white brickwork and pointed-arched windows characterise the chapel, which was enlarged in 1923.	
Salvation Army Hall		East Peckham; 51.2129°N 0.3889°E	Salvation Army	–	In continuous use since 1885, this place of worship is nearly opposite Providence Chapel. It is a simple red-brick building with round-arched windows.	
The Church in Eccles		Eccles; 51.3186°N 0.4762°E	Methodist	–	This Methodist chapel was shared with Anglicans for a time from the 1970s, after the village's St Mark's Church (built in the 1880s) was demolished. Along with its accompanying Sunday school, it was registered for worship and the certification of marriages on 1 March 1933.	
Chapel of the Holy Innocents		Fairseat; 51.3293°N 0.3264°E	Anglican	–	This red stock brick and tile cruciform church was originally the chapel of an adjacent convalescent home. It was funded by Sir Philip Hickson Waterlow, 2nd Baronet of the Waterlow baronets and opened in 1930. The interior is plastered and has a timber and iron roof. The church is now in the parish of Stansted.	
Golden Green Mission Church		Golden Green; 51.2100°N 0.3431°E	Anglican	II	Land in the hamlet of Golden Green was donated to Hadlow parish church in 1914 by the D'Avigdor-Goldsmid baronets, and a timber-framed tin tabernacle was erected on the site. It has pointed-arched windows with tracery. It has never been consecrated, and since 2003 it has also been used as a community hall.	
St Mary the Virgin's Church		Hadlow; 51.2232°N 0.3393°E	Anglican	II*	Much of the present structure dates from restorations in 1847 and 1853, but a doorway in the west wall and a quoin at the northwest corner date from the transition from Saxon to Norman architecture in the late 11th century. The tower is 13th-century and has lancet windows, but its entrance door and buttresses are newer. Former Lord Mayor of London John Rivers has a Classical-style wall monument inside.	
St Peter's Chapel		Hadlow; 51.2266°N 0.3415°E	Roman Catholic	–	Opened in the 1880s as an "Unsectarian Gospel Hall" and registered for marriages in May 1885, this was still in religious use by Brethren in 1950 but was later sold and used as a playgroup. It was then purchased by the Catholic Church and converted into a chapel served from Tonbridge. It is a simple building with bands of red and yellow brick and a slate-tiled roof.	
St Andrew's Church		Hadlow Stair, Tonbridge; 51.2086°N 0.3049°E	Anglican	–	This grew out of an Anglican mission held at Fish Hall, a mansion in north Tonbridge. A disused timber-framed tin tabernacle was purchased in Brighton, transported to Tonbridge and re-erected on a plot of land donated by A.E. Peters of Fish Hall. Later dedicated to Saint Andrew, it became part of St Peter and St Paul Church's parish in 1940.	
Tonbridge Methodist Church		Higham Wood, Tonbridge; 51.2119°N 0.2950°E	Methodist	–	At various times, six chapels were used for Methodist worship in Tonbridge before the present church was built in a northeastern suburb in 1965. The first stone was laid in May of that year, and it opened in the November. It was greatly extended in 1993. A Wesleyan chapel at Golden Green, built in 1899 and closed in 1956, was sold in 1958 to pay for it.	
St John the Evangelist's Church		Hildenborough; 51.2174°N 0.2392°E	Anglican	II	Ewan Christian's first church dates from 1843 to 1844 and was provided to serve Hildenborough, then an outlying village in Tonbridge parish. Coarse local sandstone and Kentish Ragstone are used for the walls and tower, which is topped with a broach spire laid with shingles. There are stained glass windows by Edward Burne-Jones (representing John the Evangelist) and Morris & Co. (depicting Joy).	
Hildenborough Gospel Hall		Hildenborough; 51.2163°N 0.2427°E	Brethren	–	This Brethren Gospel Hall was registered for the celebration of marriages in February 1895.	
St Peter's Church		Ightham; 51.2892°N 0.2858°E	Anglican	I	Brownish ironstone rubble laid in courses with some red brick are the main materials used in this church, a 14th/15th-century rebuild of an earlier place of worship. A brick-built aisle was added in 1739. The church is famous for its range of 14th- to 17th-century monuments and sculptures.	
Holy Trinity Church		Larkfield; 51.3063°N 0.4441°E	Anglican	II	Built as a chapel of ease to East Malling parish church in 1854, this large Kentish Ragstone with a distinctive west end (heavily buttressed, lit by a rose window and topped by "a complex triple bell-gable") was designed by R.P. Pope. It is Early English Gothic Revival in style, and there is Alexander Gibbs stained glass.	
Larkfield and East Malling Methodist Church		Larkfield; 51.2989°N 0.4422°E	Methodist	–	Situated in Larkfield but serving both villages in the civil parish of East Malling and Larkfield, this Methodist chapel replaced one built in 1844 near East Malling railway station. This has since been demolished. The new church was registered for marriages in April 1964.	
St Peter and St Paul's Church		Leybourne; 51.3044°N 0.4223°E	Anglican	II*	A Norman church was added to in the 16th century and restored by Arthur Blomfield between 1873 and 1877. Old internal features include one window in the nave and a "heart shrine" associated with Roger de Leybourne (died 1271).	
St Lawrence's Church		Mereworth; 51.2588°N 0.3778°E	Anglican	I	The 12th-century church in this village was demolished and rebuilt 5/8 mile (1.0 km) to the northwest in 1744–46 at the request of, and with funding from, John Fane, the 7th Earl of Westmorland of Mereworth Castle. Described as "the outstanding 18th-century church in the county", the architect of the Palladian-style stone building is unknown.	
St Michael and All Angels Church		Offham; 51.2975°N 0.3801°E	Anglican	I	The Norman church of c. 1100 was extended and renovated on several occasions over the next three centuries, and was restored further in the Victorian era. The tower is partly 12th-century and partly 15th-century.	
Offham Methodist Church		Offham; 51.2917°N 0.3727°E	Methodist	–	This was originally a Primitive Methodist chapel, and is the second in the village: a building erected in 1848 was replaced by this simple brick structure in 1892. It stands on the road to Teston. Its marriage registration dates from August 1968.	
St Mary's Church		Platt; 51.2892°N 0.3253°E	Anglican	II	Designed by Whichcord and Walker for £3,363 in 1841–42, the cruciform church is "quite large and well sited above the road", with a prominent Perpendicular Gothic Revival tower. The rest of the stone building is Early English Gothic Revival in style. Inside is a substantial hammerbeam roof.	
Plaxtol Church		Plaxtol; 51.2594°N 0.2945°E	Anglican	II*	Dedicated to no saint, this is a complete mid-17th-century building (there is a 1649 datestone over the doorway) which has been added to, principally in 1852 and 1894. Robert Pearsall was the architect who added the chancel and transepts in the latter year.	
St Martin's Church		Ryarsh; 51.3068°N 0.3979°E	Anglican	II*	The nave and chancel are early 12th-century and retain their Norman appearance, but the west window and heavily buttressed tower, with its corner turret topped with a low pyramid spire, are 14th/15th-century Perpendicular Gothic. A 12th-century piscina survives inside.	
Ryarsh Baptist Chapel		Ryarsh; 51.3156°N 0.3936°E	Baptist	–	Originally named Jireh Chapel, this was built in 1863-64 and has had both a Strict and a Reformed Baptist character at various times. The exterior is rendered, but the walls are of brick.	
St Giles' Church		Shipbourne; 51.2471°N 0.2786°E	Anglican	II	Edward Cazalet of the Fairlawne Estate paid for the church to be rebuilt in 1880; Maun and Saunders were the chosen architects. The small cruciform Early English Gothic Revival building replaced an earlier church (1722, by James Gibbs) which was in turn a rebuilding of a 14th-century church.	
All Saints Church		Snodland; 51.3299°N 0.4497°E	Anglican	I	The church's origins are 12th-century, but additions were made regularly until the 15th century and Arthur Blomfield restored the building in 1870. The windows are variously Decorated and Perpendicular Gothic in style; the large tower is also Perpendicular-style. There are 14th-century wall paintings.	
Christ Church		Snodland; 51.3246°N 0.4405°E	Anglican	–	New housing in the south of Snodland was served by a tin tabernacle on Oxford Street between 1873 and 1893, when Christ Church was opened. Work had started on the Kentish Ragstone building in April 1892. Percy Monkton designed the Early English Gothic Revival building, which lacks a tower or spire.	
Kingdom Hall		Snodland; 51.3299°N 0.4489°E	Jehovah's Witnesses	–	Located on Mill Street in the town, this Kingdom Hall was registered for the celebration of marriages in February 1989. It is used by the Medway, Cuxton Congregation of Jehovah's Witnesses.	
St Mary the Virgin's Church		Stansted; 51.3355°N 0.3061°E	Anglican	II*	Originally rebuilt in about 1400, this was heavily altered again by several rounds of Victorian restoration. The interior, an almost complete scheme of Perpendicular Gothic arches, arcades and octagonal piers, has been little altered. The chancel screen may survive from an older church.	
St Peter and St Paul's Church		Tonbridge; 51.1978°N 0.2768°E	Anglican	II*	Little survives from the 12th-century church on the site; the tower and chancel arch are 14th-century, and the rest of the building dates mostly from 1877 to 1879 when Ewan Christian restored and greatly extended it. Both the nave and chancel have aisles. There are several 17th- and 18th-century memorials inside.	
St Eanswythe's Mission		Tonbridge; 51.1899°N 0.2768°E	Anglican	–	Opened in 1890 as a non-denominational mission held in a 250-capacity tin tabernacle, this now has an Anglican character and is housed in a combined church and residential building erected after the original building was demolished in September 2004. Founder Mary Gorham received an MBE for her work with the town's poor people.	
St Saviour's Church		Tonbridge; 51.2040°N 0.2750°E	Anglican	–	When opened in 1875, St Saviour's had the dual purpose of serving worshippers in the north of Tonbridge, which was distant from the parish church, and offering services in a more Anglo-Catholic "High Church" style than were available elsewhere. Ewan Christian's red-brick church has a semicircular apse, a flèche and an undivided nave and chancel.	
St Stephen's Church		Tonbridge; 51.1899°N 0.2689°E	Anglican	–	Ewan Christian designed this church between 1851 and 1854 in the Early English Gothic Revival style, as he did later at St Stephen's, but it has a tall spire and a rectangular plan with no apse. The Kentish Ragstone walls are "laid like crazy paving, which is never a success" according to architectural historian John Newman. Morris & Co. provided stained glass between 1910 and 1913. The church was consecrated in 1852 and parished in 1853.	
Pembury Road Baptist Chapel		Tonbridge; 51.1880°N 0.2721°E	Baptist	–	For most of its existence this was known as Zion Chapel. It was founded by seceders from Ebenezer Chapel, founded in 1857 by Calvinist resident Mr Piper: Worshippers who wanted to establish a Strict Baptist chapel left and erected their own chapel on land donated by the Nye sisters of Hadlow Stair. C. Punnett and Sons' Classical-style brick building opened in 1867.	
Tonbridge Evangelical Free Church		Tonbridge; 51.1906°N 0.2664°E	Evangelical	–	Seceders from the town's Baptist church founded a new place of worship in the early 20th century. Services were held above a shop until the Douglas Road Mission Church was erected in 1912. It changed its name in 1920 to the Independent Church and again in 1954 to its present name, and is served by pastors.	
River Church		Tonbridge; 51.1926°N 0.2727°E	Non-denominational	–	Members of St Saviour's Church founded this non-denominational church in 1998 under the name Church on the Way. Worshippers met at a hall when the church first started but moved to The River Centre when this was built by the River Medway in 2003. At this time the church was called The River Centre Church. The church is today known as River Church and holds its meetings by kind permission at the premises of Christ Church United Reformed Church.	
Corpus Christi Church		Tonbridge; 51.1963°N 0.2785°E	Roman Catholic	–	The first Roman Catholic church in Tonbridge, also named Corpus Christi, was a tin tabernacle erected in 1894. It was replaced by the present building on a different site in 1904. W. Barnsley Hughes was the architect; he provided a brick and stone church with narrow aisles and a gallery above. A Lady chapel was added in 1906.	
Christ Church		Tonbridge; 51.1926°N 0.2727°E	United Reformed Church	–	A Gothic Revival chapel was founded in 1875 and registered in April of that year. It was built at a cost of £4,500 to serve Congregationalists, who had previously used the Independent Chapel of 1791. Severely damaged in the Great Flood of 1968, the red-brick building survived until 1976 but was replaced by the present church in 1978. This was extended to the rear in 1987.	
Tonbridge Baptist Church		Trench Wood, Tonbridge; 51.2106°N 0.2753°E	Baptist	–	On 8 April 1868, a "Baptist Congregational" church was founded in Tonbridge. A site for a permanent church was found on the High Street, and C.G. Searle's Gothic Revival brick and stone building was ready by Easter 1872. The Great Flood of 1968 wrecked the building: it was still used until 1970, but a new church was built elsewhere in the town and was opened in September 1973.	
Cornerstone Christian Fellowship Gospel Hall		Trench Wood, Tonbridge; 51.2166°N 0.2760°E	Brethren	–	This 1970s building is the successor to the Cage Green Mission Room, built in a Vernacular style in 1874 for Congregationalists in the north of Tonbridge. It was re-registered as a Gospel Hall for Brethren in 1929, but was demolished for road widening in 1970.	
Church of St Peter and St Paul, Trottiscliffe		Trottiscliffe; 51.3202°N 0.3612°E	Anglican	I	There has been very little alteration at this Norman church, which is built of flint and tufa and has a simple tower-nave-chancel layout. The "magnificent" tall pulpit dates from 1775 and was originally in Westminster Abbey. Stained glass includes some by Ward and Hughes.	
Walderslade Baptist Church		Walderslade Woods; 51.3332°N 0.5207°E	Baptist	–	Situated in the small part of Walderslade that is within Tonbridge and Malling Borough—much of the suburb lies within the unitary authority of Medway—this church occupies part of a mixed-use building and was registered for marriages in April 1992.	
St John the Baptist's Church		Wateringbury; 51.2573°N 0.4138°E	Anglican	II*	Joseph Clarke's "unpleasant" restoration of 1856 was followed by further work in 1889 by W.O. Milne, but the church retains its stuccoed Early English Gothic tower and Perpendicular Gothic chancel. The aisles and arcades of the nave were added in the 19th century. The entrance porch is 15th-century.	
Barn Chapel at Pilsdon Community		West Malling; 51.2920°N 0.4099°E	Anglican	II*	This is the 15th-century former tithe barn at Ewell Monastery, a minor religious house behind the Benedictine Malling Abbey. The Pilsdon Community at Malling was founded in 2004; it is based on the spiritual principles established by 17th-century theologian Nicholas Ferrar. Worship takes place four times a day and is open to the public.	
St Mary the Virgin's Church		West Malling; 51.2922°N 0.4066°E	Anglican	II*	The original Norman building was extended in the 13th century, when a dogtooth-moulded doorway was added. More additions were made in the 14th and 15th centuries, and George Gwilt designed a Classical-style aisled nave in 1778. This was replaced by the present structure in 1901–03. The tall spire dates from 1837.	
West Malling Free Church		West Malling; 51.2943°N 0.4115°E	Baptist	II	This brick chapel was erected in 1836, but the façade was rendered and new lancet windows were inserted in 1894 as part of renovation works which cost £399. In the 20th century a roughcast exterior was added. A columned and gabled entrance porch is set between two pointed-arched windows.	
St Thomas More's Church		West Malling; 51.2949°N 0.4187°E	Roman Catholic	–	There was originally a small church in Frog Lane, which was served from Maidstone. West Malling parish was created in 1960, and in 1964 land was bought on the edge of the village for a new church and Catholic school. These were opened in 1972 and 1973 respectively.	
St Dunstan's Church		West Peckham; 51.2486°N 0.3546°E	Anglican	I	A Saxon tower survives at this mostly medieval church; it is short, stocky and topped with a pyramidal spire. The nave and chancel have no structural division and have a variety of old windows. A north aisle and side chapel were added in the 14th century.	
All Saints Church		Wouldham; 51.3528°N 0.4581°E	Anglican	I	"Continuous and eccentric growth" since the 11th century give this church a distinctive appearance, with a narrow chancel, a north aisle at a strange orientation, a modestly extended south aisle and a prominent tower with battlements and a stair-turret.	
St George's Church		Wrotham; 51.3090°N 0.3111°E	Anglican	I	This large 14th-century church overlooks the village High Street. The tower was added a century later and is pierced by a passageway used for processions—an uncommon design. The passage-style arcades between the aisles and the nave are also rare. Restoration work was undertaken in 1861 and 1876.	

== Closed or disused places of worship ==
Closed or disused places of worship
Name	Image	Location	Denomination/ Affiliation	Grade	Notes	Refs
Aylesford Methodist Chapel		Aylesford; 51.3041°N 0.4831°E	Methodist	II	Built in 1851 to the design of Rev. F. Jobson's drawings in a book, this Early English Gothic Revival chapel survived in religious use until November 1990. It was registered for marriages in 1866, by which time an internal gallery and a Sunday school had been added. Kentish Ragstone and slate are the building materials.	
St Mary's Church		Burham; 51.3313°N 0.4627°E	Anglican	I	This riverside church became redundant after the village developed further away on a hilly site. Restored from 1956 onwards after becoming derelict, it is now looked after by the Churches Conservation Trust. It has Norman, Early English and Perpendicular Gothic work.	
Church of Our Lady of the Meadows		Dode (Note: Dode village is in the Borough of Gravesham, but the church lies within Tonbridge and Malling.); 51.3481°N 0.3946°E	Roman Catholic	II*	This is an isolated rural chapel with a simple nave and chancel, built of flint in the Norman era. It fell out of use before the Reformation, but was restored in 1905–06 and sold to the Catholic Church in 1954. It was reopened under its present dedication and used for occasional services, but has since become a private wedding venue.	
St Michael's Church		East Peckham; 51.2445°N 0.3792°E	Anglican	II*	Like Burham, this stands in a remote location distant from where its village developed, and is owned by the Churches Conservation Trust. Much of the present appearance is Perpendicular Gothic, and restoration was carried out in 1857, but some Norman fabric remains.	
People's Hall		Eccles; 51.3178°N 0.4782°E	Non-denominational	–	This hall had been registered for worship in December 1934, but its entry on the Worship Register was cancelled 37 years later.	
Hadlow Particular Baptist Chapel		Hadlow; 51.2244°N 0.3403°E	Baptist	–	This Strict Baptist chapel closed in 1982 and was converted into a house. Built in 1830 in a simple Vernacular style, it has pointed-arched windows with tracery, red-brick walls and a centrally placed porch.	
Ightham Methodist Chapel		Ightham; 51.2869°N 0.2821°E	Methodist	II	Now a house, this former chapel dates from 1848 and was registered for marriages in May 1886. It is a large Classical-style building with an entrance porch (a later addition) set below a pediment. The walls are of sandstone with some brickwork.	
Ivy Hatch Church		Ivy Hatch; 51.2681°N 0.2725°E	Anglican	–		
St Stephen's Mission Church		Lower Haysden; 51.1888°N 0.2442°E	Anglican	–	The ruined remains of this 100-capacity tin tabernacle, closed in about 1956, still stand in an overgrown field in the hamlet of Lower Haysden, west of Tonbridge. It was erected in 1878 on a site given by Lord de L'Isle and was served from St Stephen's Church; the first service was on 16 June 1878. The windows had pointed arches.	
St Benedict's Church		Paddlesworth, Snodland; 51.3332°N 0.4170°E	Anglican	II*	A tiny Norman chapel with a 13th-century chancel arch, set next to a remote farm, this fell out of religious use in 1678 and was only restored in the early 20th century. It stands on the Pilgrims' Way west of Snodland.	
Plaxtol Methodist Chapel		Plaxtol; 51.2579°N 0.2959°E	Methodist	–	Built in 1893 for Wesleyan Methodists, closed in the early 1980s and sold for residential conversion in 1982, this building retains its red-brick walls, lancet windows and tiled roof. It was registered for marriages between May 1913 and January 1981.	
Primitive Methodist Chapel		Snodland; 51.3289°N 0.4417°E	Methodist	–	Joshua Wilford's Renaissance Revival-style rendered brick chapel of 1899–1900, built for £1,000, closed in 1976 and was deregistered in 1982. It was sold to a furniture company and is now a car showroom. The chapel succeeded one founded in 1877.	
Church of the New Jerusalem		Snodland; 51.3299°N 0.4497°E	Swedenborgian	II	The local Hook family, who were influenced by the Swedenborgian movement when visiting Gloucestershire, brought the cause to Snodland in 1849 by holding meetings in a room. Samuel Hook added a chapel to the side of his house in 1864, but it was superseded by a large Early English Gothic Revival-style Kentish Ragstone and tile church on the High Street in 1881. It had lancet windows and a prominent tower, and cost £5,000. It was still used in the 1980s but is now a house; its marriage registration was cancelled in July 1994.	
United Church		Snodland; 51.3301°N 0.4437°E	United Reformed Church/Methodist	–	A Congregational church was built on the road to Holborough in 1855. It was sold in 1887 and the proceeds used to build a large chapel on Snodland High Street. This opened on 28 November 1888. Joshua Wilford built the Early English Gothic Revival chapel of stock brick and Bath Stone. It became structurally unsound and closed in August 2011.	
St Saviour's Mission Room		Tonbridge; 51.2024°N 0.2778°E	Anglican	–	This small, domestic-style chapel of ease was built on Seven Acre Square (now called Elm Lane) in 1886. It was an extension to a Sunday school built in 1882–83. The building was bought by the Red Cross in 1960 and was still used by that group in the 1980s, but has subsequently become a house.	
Tonbridge Wesleyan Church		Tonbridge; 51.1965°N 0.2761°E	Methodist	II	Tonbridge's main Wesleyan Methodist church was built in 1872 on the site of its predecessor of 1829. Designed in a Decorated Gothic Revival style by Cattermole and Eade of Ipswich and built by local firm C. Punnett and Sons, it combined red brick and stonework. Its last service was on 1 July 1990, and it was deregistered four months later.	
United Methodist Free Church		Tonbridge; 51.1894°N 0.2731°E	Methodist	–	This polychromatic brick Renaissance Revival chapel was provided in south Tonbridge for the short-lived United Methodist Free Churches arm of Methodism. Built in 1868, it was in religious use for 51 years but was then sold for commercial use.	
Wesleyan Mission Chapel		Tonbridge; 51.1921°N 0.2710°E	Methodist	–	Principally a Wesleyan Methodist school, this Decorated Gothic Revival building (erected in 1869) was also used as a mission church between 1890 and 1909, and possibly for longer. The windows have tracery, and the walls are formed of courses of polychromatic brick. By the 1980s it was used for adult education.	
Independent Chapel		Tonbridge; 51.1977°N 0.2747°E	Independent	–	Independent Congregationalists founded Tonbridge's first Nonconformist place of worship in 1751; only St Peter and St Paul's Church pre-dated it. The group met in a rented room, but in 1791 they built this chapel on Back Lane (now Bank Street). It was superseded in 1876 by a new chapel on the High Street, nearer the centre of population.	
Ebenezer Chapel		Tonbridge; 51.1941°N 0.2731°E	Independent Calvinistic	–	Tonbridge resident Mr Piper built a chapel for himself and fellow Calvinists on land he owned in Tonbridge in 1857. Often known as Piper's Chapel, it was rebuilt nearby in 1898 (using red brick and with pointed-arched windows) and survived in religious use until 1971—although its worship registration was not cancelled until 1980. It has since been used for storage.	
Gospel Hall		Wouldham; 51.3486°N 0.4578°E	Brethren	–	This Gospel Hall was situated on Ferry Lane. It was registered for marriages in July 1946 and deregistered in February 1980.	

== St Leonard's Tower ==
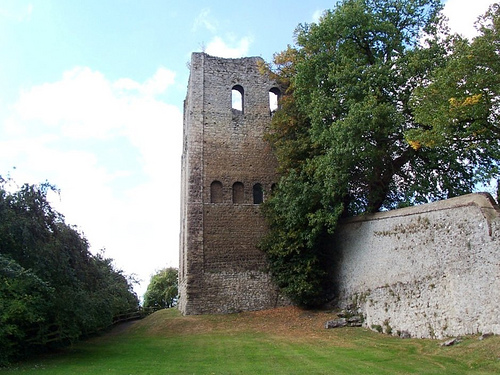
Some sources state that St Leonard's Tower is part of a Norman church.

St Leonard's Tower is a Grade I-listed building in West Malling. Resembling a church tower, it was built as the keep of a castle by Gundulf, the Bishop of Rochester between 1077 and 1108. Described as "remarkably preserved", it has been identified by some sources as the tower of a former church dedicated to St Leonard. The 70 by 32 feet (21.3 m × 9.8 m) building was apparently demolished to allow its stonework to be used elsewhere, leaving only the tower standing on a rocky outcrop 1/4 mile (0.40 km) southwest of the town. More recent research casts doubt on this: John Newman, writing in the Buildings of England series in 1969, stated that "[i]n 1198 St Leonard's cemetery is mentioned, and there are later references to a chapel. Yet this is no church tower, but a free-standing keep tower". English Heritage, in its assessment of the structure written in 1993, made no reference to any former religious use, instead describing it as a "former castle ... one of the best examples of an early Norman keep".

== See also ==
- List of churches preserved by the Churches Conservation Trust in Southeast England

== Bibliography ==
- Coles Finch, William (1925). In Kentish Pilgrim Land. London: C.W. Daniel.
- Homan, Roger (1984). The Victorian Churches of Kent. Chichester: Phillimore & Co. ISBN 0-85033-466-7.
- Newman, John (1969). West Kent and the Weald. Buildings of England (1st ed.). Harmondsworth: Penguin Books. ISBN 978-0-300-09614-9.
