= John Norwood =

Recipient of the Victoria Cross

John Norwood VC
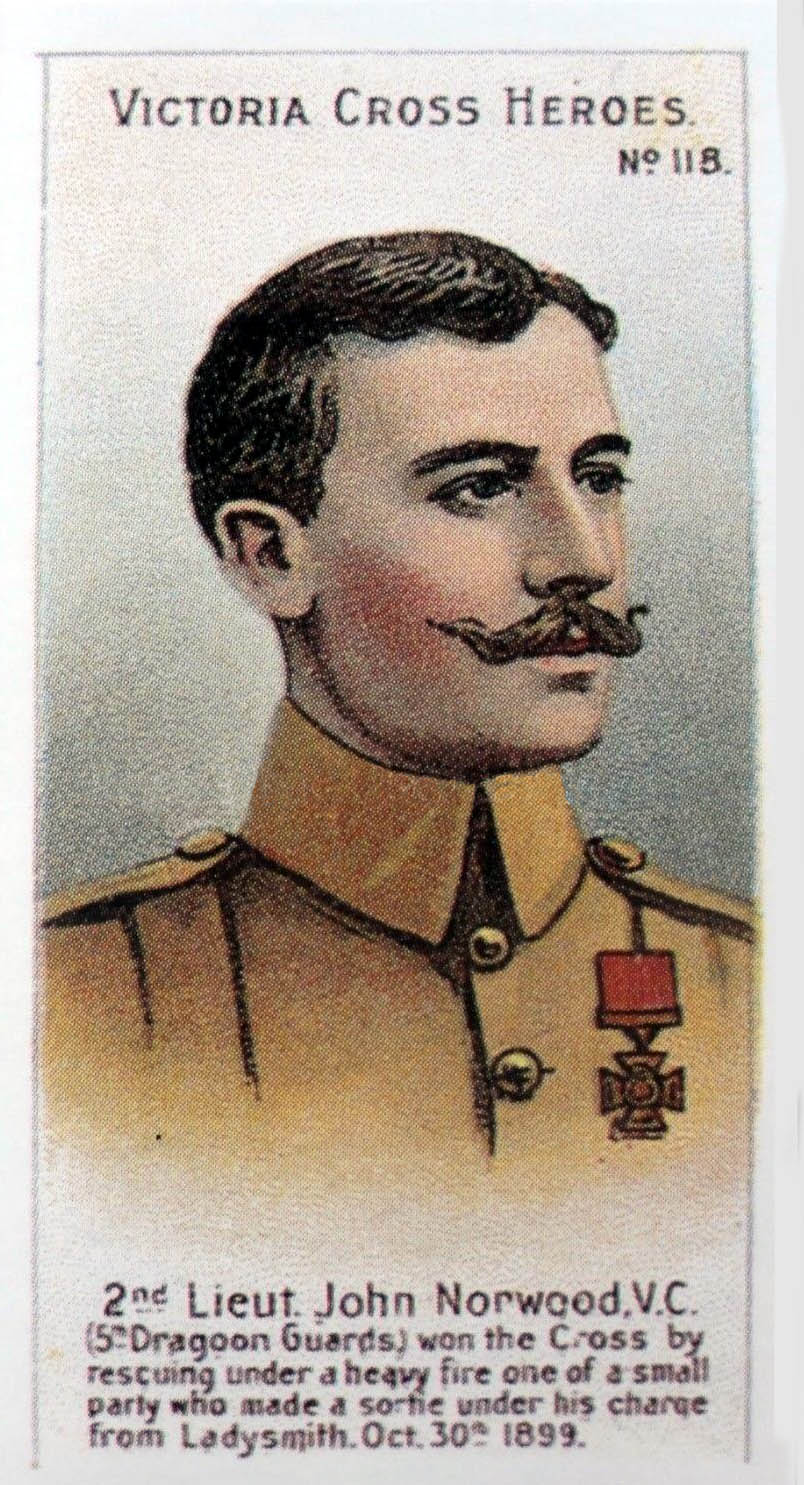
- Norwood on a cigarette card
- Born: 8 September 1876; Beckenham, Kent
- Died: 8 September 1914 (aged 38); Sablonnieres, France
- Burial place: Sablonnieres New Communal Cemetery
- Military career
- Allegiance: United Kingdom
- Branch: British Army
- Service years: 1899–1914
- Rank: Captain
- Units: 5th Dragoon Guards
- Conflicts: Second Boer War; World War I †
- Awards: Victoria Cross

Captain John Norwood VC (8 September 1876 – 8 September 1914) was an English recipient of the Victoria Cross, the highest and most prestigious award for gallantry in the face of the enemy that can be awarded to British and Commonwealth forces. He was educated at Exeter College, Oxford.

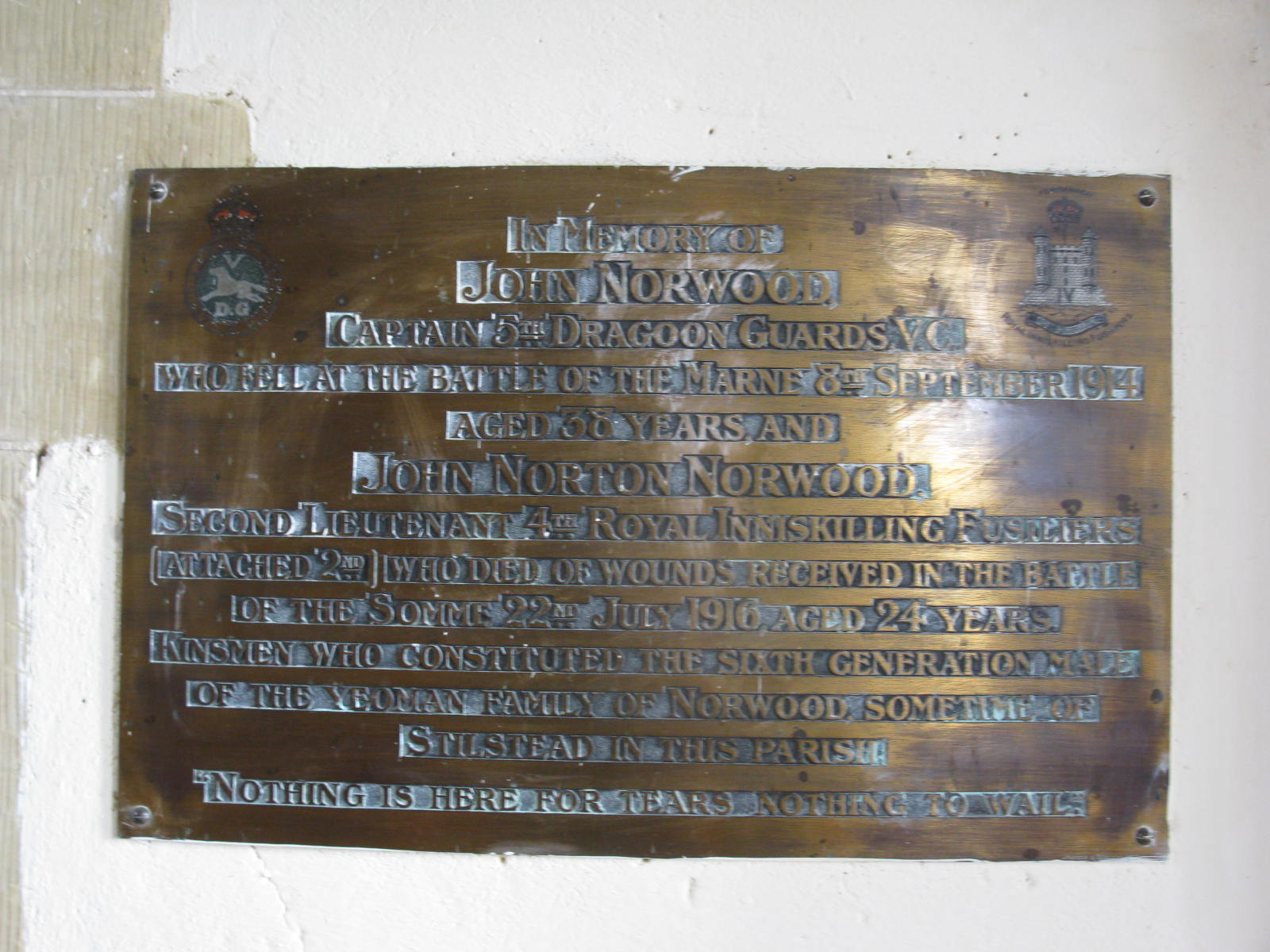
Memorial in St Michael's Church, East Peckham

== Early military career ==
Norwood was commissioned a second lieutenant in the 5th (Princess Charlotte of Wales's) Dragoon Guards on 8 February 1899.

=== Victoria Cross details ===
Norwood was 23 years old, and a second lieutenant in the 5th Dragoon Guards (Princess Charlotte of Wales's), British Army during the Second Boer War when the following deed took place at Ladysmith for which he was awarded the VC:

On the 30th October, 1899, this Officer went out from Ladysmith in charge of a small patrol of the 5th Dragoon Guards. They came under a heavy fire from the enemy, who were posted on a ridge in great force. The patrol, which had arrived within about 600 yards of the ridge, then retired at full speed. One man dropped, and Second Lieutenant Norwood galloped back about 300 yards through heavy fire, dismounted, and picking up the fallen trooper, carried him out of fire on his back, at the same time leading his horse with one hand. The enemy kept up an incessant fire during the whole time that Second Lieutenant Norwood was carrying the man until he was quite out of range.

He served in Transvaal and the Orange River Colony, and was promoted to lieutenant on 27 June 1900. He stayed with the 5th Dragoon Guards in South Africa until the war ended in May 1902, and left for Calcutta on the SS Umlazi two months later.

== Later military career ==
Norwood later achieved the rank of captain before resigning his commission in June 1909, joining the 2nd County of London (Westminster Dragoons) Yeomanry. Posted to France on the outbreak of the First World War, he was killed in action during the First Battle of the Marne at Sablonnieres on 8 September 1914.

== Memorial ==
A brass memorial to him can be seen in St Michael's Church, East Peckham, Kent.

His name is inscribed on a large plaque in Exeter College chapel, which is in remembrance of all those former members of the college who fell in the Great War.

His VC is on display at the Lord Ashcroft Gallery in the Imperial War Museum, London.

== Bibliography ==
- Monuments to Courage (David Harvey, 1999)
- The Register of the Victoria Cross (This England, 1997)
- Victoria Crosses of the Anglo-Boer War (Ian Uys, 2000)
- Ingleton, Roy (2011). Kent VCs. Pen and Sword Books. ISBN 978-1848844094.
