= St Michael's Church, East Peckham =

Redundant Anglican Church in Kent

St Michael's, East Peckham
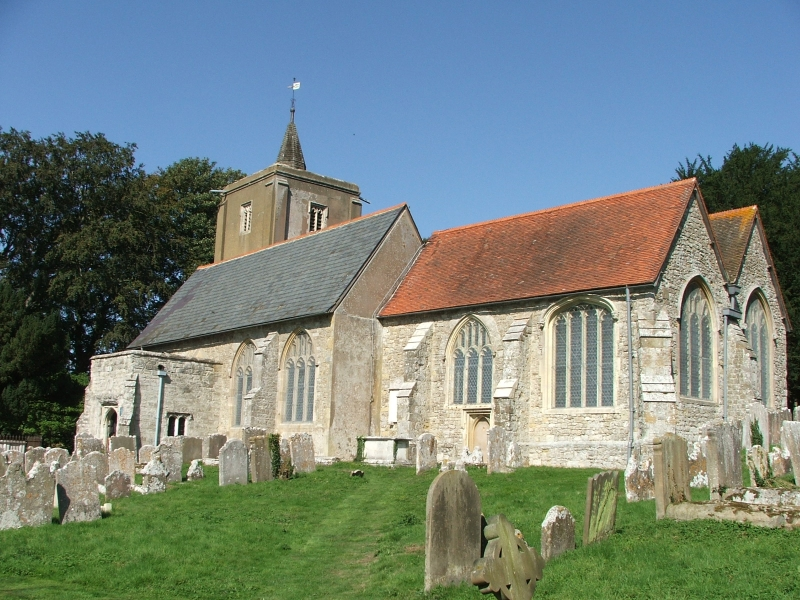

- Location within Kent
- 51°14′40″N 0°22′50″E
- OS grid reference: TQ 661 521
- Denomination: Church of England
- Website: St Michael's, East Peckham

History
- Dedication: St Michael

Administration
- Province: Canterbury
- Diocese: Rochester
- Parish: East Peckham

Clergy
- Vicar: None

St Michael's is a redundant Anglican church in East Peckham, Kent, England. The church is recorded in the National Heritage List for England as a designated Grade II* listed building, and is open to the public.

== History ==
In 961, Eadgifu of Kent gave the manor of Peckham to the monks of Canterbury. A church was in existence at the time of Domesday. The earliest surviving parts of the existing church are the north walls of the nave and chancel, which are of the mid-12th century, and a Norman-era window. The church at this time comprised the nave and a short chancel. The chancel was extended in the late 12th century. By the mid-13th century the south aisle had been built. In the late 13th century, a chapel dedicated to the Virgin Mary had been built to the east of the south aisle and south of the chancel. The tower was added in the early 14th century, and the porch in about 1500. The tower formerly carried a much taller spire than the current smaller spirelet. It was destroyed in a storm in 1704. The weathervane dates from 1928 and is a copy of the one erected in 1704. The remains of a sundial can be seen on the porch; it fell into disuse when a clock was installed in the church.

The vestry was added in the early 19th century. The church was restored by the Victorians in 1853 and 1863. St Michael's was listed at Grade II* in 1959, and it was declared redundant in 1973.

== Bells ==
St Michael's has a ring of six bells hung for change ringing. The oldest (the fifth-heaviest of the ring) was cast in 1747 by Robert Catlin. Two (the second- and third-heaviest) were cast in 1785 by William Mears of the Whitechapel Bell Foundry. The heaviest (the sixth, usually called the tenor) was cast in 1812 and the lightest (the first, usually called the treble) was cast in 1825 by Thomas Mears II and the remaining bell (the fourth-heaviest) was cast in 1890, by Mears & Stainbank (all successors to Wiliam Mears at Whitechapel).

From tenor to treble, the bells are tuned approximately to: G♭, A♭, B♭, B, D♭, E♭.

== Memorials ==
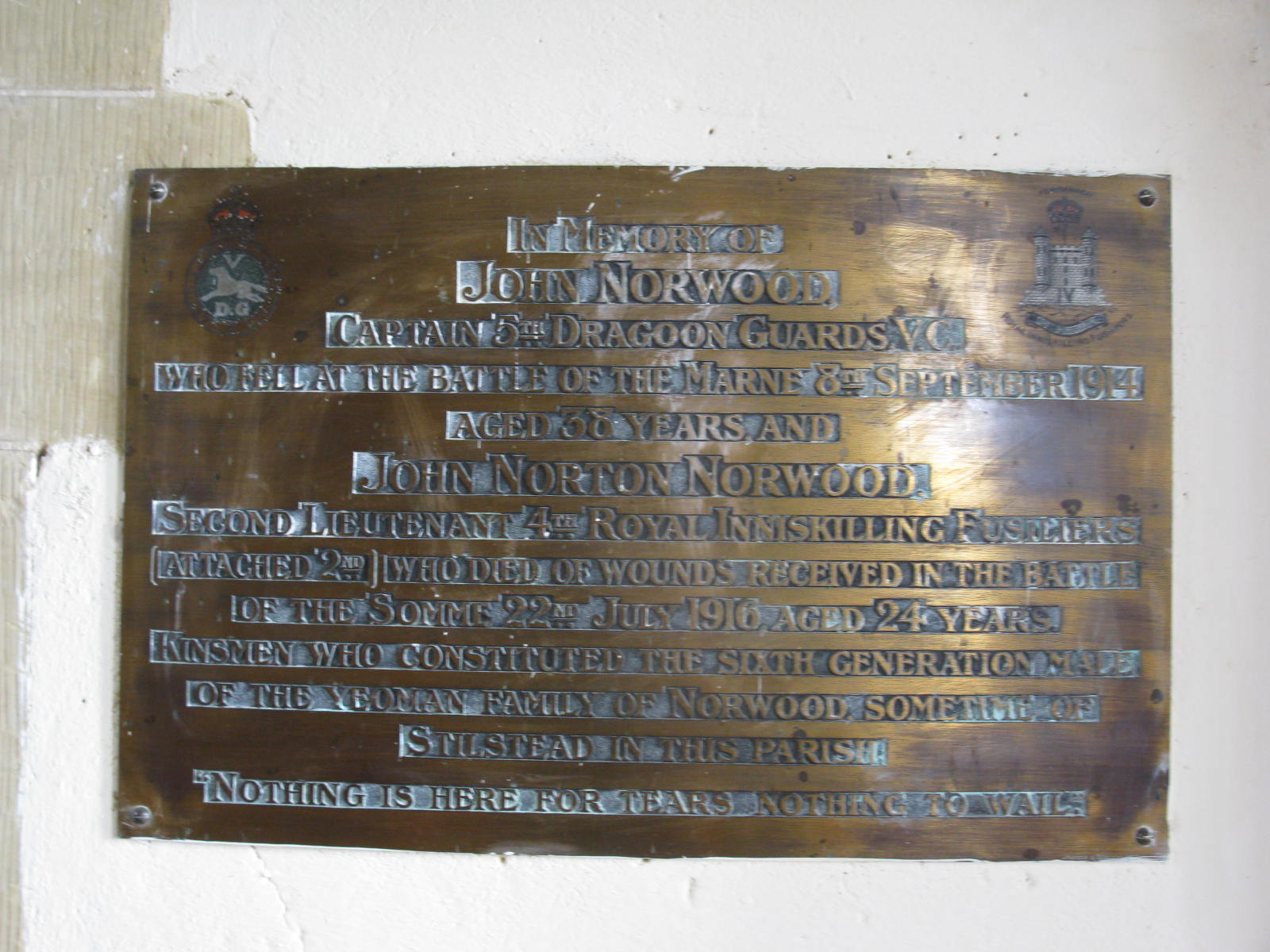
Memorial to John Norwood, VC

St Michael's has a number of memorials, including those to:

- Richard Etclesley, who died in 1426, bequeathing the gift of a chalice to the church.
- The Henham family, who were farmers in East Peckham and propagated the Henham variety of hop.
- John Norwood VC, who rescued a fallen comrade during the Second Boer War under intense enemy fire.
- The Twysden family, who owned Roydon Hall, the manor of East Peckham. Isabella Twysden and Sir Roger Twysden both refer in their writings to the family plot at East Peckham church. Philip Twysden (1713–1752), Bishop of Raphoe, was both baptised and buried in the church.
- The Whetenhall Stones, including those to the second and third wives of Thomas Whetenhall.

== Public access ==
The church is open to the public daily from 10 a.m. to 4 p.m.

== See also ==
- List of churches preserved by the Churches Conservation Trust in Southeast England
- List of places of worship in Tonbridge and Malling
