= St Mary's Church, Burham =

Coordinates: 51.3313°N 0.4626°E

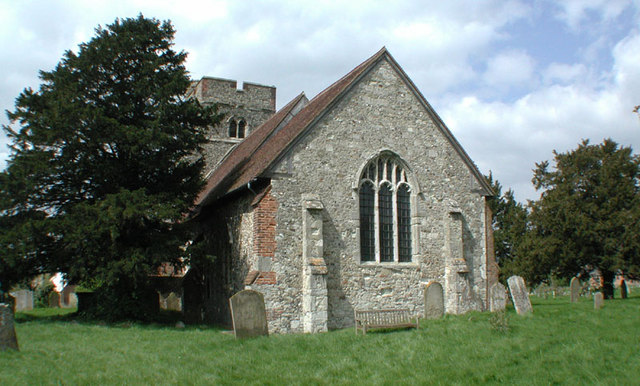
- St Mary's Church, Burham, from the southeast

- Location in Kent
- OS grid reference: TQ 717 620
- Location: Burham, Kent
- Country: England
- Denomination: Anglican
- Website: Churches Conservation Trust

Architecture
- Functional status: Redundant
- Heritage designation: Grade I
- Designated: 25 August 1959
- Architectural type: Church
- Style: Norman, Gothic

Specifications
- Materials: Ragstone rubble Tiled roofs

St Mary's Church is a redundant Anglican church near the village of Burham, Kent, England. It is recorded in the National Heritage List for England as a designated Grade I listed building, and is under the care of the Churches Conservation Trust. The church stands 1 kilometre (0.6 mi) to the west of the village, on the Pilgrims' Way, overlooking the River Medway.

== History ==
The church originated in the 12th century, with additions and alterations up to the 15th century. It served a village that later became deserted as the population moved away to higher ground. North and south aisles were added to the church, but have since been demolished. The church was restored in 1956.

== Architecture ==
St Mary's is constructed in ragstone rubble and has tiled roofs. Its plan consists of a nave with a south porch, a chancel, and a west tower. The tower is in three stages and has a battlemented parapet. To its south west is an octagonal stair turret. In the north wall of the nave are three windows, and on the south are two windows and a porch. The blocked arcade between the former north aisle and nave is visible on the exterior of the church. Inside the church are two Norman fonts.

== See also ==
- List of churches preserved by the Churches Conservation Trust in Southeast England
- List of places of worship in Tonbridge and Malling
