= Listed buildings in East Peckham =

Civil Parish in Kent, England

East Peckham is a village and civil parish in the Tonbridge and Malling district of Kent, England. It contains 96 listed buildings that are recorded in the National Heritage List for England. Of these five are grade II* and 91 are grade II.

This list is based on the information retrieved online from Historic England.

== Key ==
Grade	Criteria
I	Buildings that are of exceptional interest
II*	Particularly important buildings of more than special interest
II	Buildings that are of special interest

== Listing ==
Name	Grade	Location	Type	Completed (Note: The date given is the date used by Historic England as significant for the initial building or that of an important part in the structure's description.)	Date designated	Grid ref. (Note: The grid reference is based on the British national grid reference system, sometimes known as OSGB36, used by the Ordnance Survey.) Geo-coordinates	Notes	Entry number (Note: The "List Entry Number" is a unique number assigned to each listed building and scheduled monument by Historic England.)	Image	Wikidata
Former Blue Bell Public House	II	1 Beltring Road, TN12 6QH	pub		19 April 1985	TQ6756647683; 51°12′14″N 0°23′50″E		1070720	Former Blue Bell Public House More images	Q26325020
L-shaped Farm Building at Bullen Farm	II				6 November 2012	TQ6606849041; 51°12′59″N 0°22′35″E		1411841	Upload Photo	Q26676233
Barn and Cattle Byre to Bullen Farm 75 Yards to South West, Across Road	II	Across Road, Bullen Lane, Bullen Farm			19 April 1985	TQ6605949012; 51°12′58″N 0°22′35″E		1363008	Upload Photo	Q26644864
Bucklers Cottage the Coppers	II	Addlestead Road			19 April 1985	TQ6621048751; 51°12′50″N 0°22′42″E		1069959	Upload Photo	Q26323419
Bullen Cottage	II	Addlestead Road			19 April 1985	TQ6622148677; 51°12′47″N 0°22′42″E		1069960	Upload Photo	Q26323421
Three Points Cottage	II	Addlestead Road			19 April 1985	TQ6622248657; 51°12′47″N 0°22′42″E		1363391	Upload Photo	Q26645219
Tudor Cottage	II	Addlestead Road			19 April 1985	TQ6630548422; 51°12′39″N 0°22′46″E		1363392	Upload Photo	Q26645220
Walnut Tree Cottage	II	Addlestead Road			19 April 1985	TQ6633448453; 51°12′40″N 0°22′48″E		1069961	Upload Photo	Q26323423
Well Cottage	II	Addlestead Road			19 April 1985	TQ6637148365; 51°12′37″N 0°22′50″E		1069962	Upload Photo	Q26323425
Barn 50 Yards to East of Pond Farmhouse	II	Bells Farm Road, Pond Farm			19 April 1985	TQ6581250475; 51°13′46″N 0°22′24″E		1363006	Upload Photo	Q26644862
Barn to North of Bells Farmhouse	II	Bells Farm Road, Bells Farm			19 April 1985	TQ6531449512; 51°13′15″N 0°21′57″E		1363007	Upload Photo	Q26644863
Bells Farmhouse	II	Bells Farm Road			19 April 1985	TQ6532049489; 51°13′14″N 0°21′57″E		1070718	Upload Photo	Q26325014
Crowhurst Farmhouse	II	Bells Farm Road			19 April 1985	TQ6600550252; 51°13′38″N 0°22′34″E		1069963	Upload Photo	Q26323427
Crowhurst Oast and Granary	II	Bells Farm Road			19 April 1985	TQ6594150287; 51°13′40″N 0°22′31″E		1363005	Upload Photo	Q26644861
Kent House Farmhouse	II	Bells Farm Road			1 August 1952	TQ6532049117; 51°13′02″N 0°21′57″E		1070719	Upload Photo	Q26325017
Ponds Farmhouse	II	Bells Farm Road			19 April 1985	TQ6576050473; 51°13′46″N 0°22′22″E		1070716	Upload Photo	Q26325008
Yew Tree Cottage	II	Bells Farm Road			19 April 1985	TQ6533349687; 51°13′21″N 0°21′58″E		1070717	Upload Photo	Q26325011
Brooker Cottage	II	Branbridges			2 July 2001	TQ6743247300; 51°12′01″N 0°23′43″E		1245945	Upload Photo	Q26538410
Beltring Green Farmhouse	II	Branbridges Road			19 April 1985	TQ6780847763; 51°12′16″N 0°24′03″E		1070721	Upload Photo	Q26325023
Branbridges House	II	Branbridges Road			19 April 1985	TQ6725648508; 51°12′41″N 0°23′35″E		1070724	Upload Photo	Q26325026
Former Joiner's Workshop Immediately South of the River Medway at Branbridges	II	Branbridges Road			26 April 2010	TQ6744348473; 51°12′39″N 0°23′45″E		1393759	Upload Photo	Q26672903
Oast Houses and Granaries at Whitbreads Hop Farm	II*	Branbridges Road			25 August 1959	TQ6740047504; 51°12′08″N 0°23′41″E		1070722	Upload Photo	Q17546813
Bullen Farmhouse	II	Bullen Lane			19 April 1985	TQ6613449057; 51°13′00″N 0°22′39″E		1184951	Upload Photo	Q26480261
Bush Farmhouse	II	Bullen Lane			19 April 1985	TQ6611749877; 51°13′26″N 0°22′39″E		1070727	Upload Photo	Q26325037
Cartreff Raffanjim	II	Bullen Lane			19 April 1985	TQ6611749573; 51°13′16″N 0°22′39″E		1070726	Upload Photo	Q26325032
Dawes Cottage	II	Bullen Lane			19 April 1985	TQ6602349334; 51°13′09″N 0°22′33″E		1299860	Upload Photo	Q26587216
Newark House	II	Bullen Lane			19 April 1985	TQ6617949987; 51°13′30″N 0°22′42″E		1363009	Upload Photo	Q26644865
Rose Villa	II	Bullen Lane			19 April 1985	TQ6614348811; 51°12′52″N 0°22′39″E		1070725	Upload Photo	Q26325029
The Long Arm	II	Bullen Lane			19 April 1985	TQ6620650140; 51°13′35″N 0°22′44″E		1184986	Upload Photo	Q26480295
Walnut Cottage	II	Bullen Lane			19 April 1985	TQ6618148784; 51°12′51″N 0°22′41″E		1184942	Upload Photo	Q26480253
Church of the Holy Trinity	II	Bush Road	church building		19 April 1985	TQ6643049144; 51°13′02″N 0°22′54″E		1070728	Church of the Holy Trinity More images	Q26325040
East Peckham War Memorial	II	Bush Road, TN12 5LH			6 September 2018	TQ6640949137; 51°13′02″N 0°22′53″E		1458301	Upload Photo	Q66479812
Flints Cottage	II	Bush Road			19 April 1985	TQ6627349652; 51°13′19″N 0°22′47″E		1185030	Upload Photo	Q26480339
Pimms Place and Railings to East	II	Bush Road			19 April 1985	TQ6628149626; 51°13′18″N 0°22′47″E		1363010	Upload Photo	Q26644866
The Bush Blackbird and Thrush Public House	II	Bush Road	pub		1 August 1952	TQ6637249908; 51°13′27″N 0°22′52″E		1070729	The Bush Blackbird and Thrush Public House More images	Q26325043
Two Ashes	II	Bush Road			19 April 1985	TQ6629549423; 51°13′11″N 0°22′48″E		1184995	Upload Photo	Q26480304
Bullen Place	II	39, Chidley Cross Road			19 April 1985	TQ6629348824; 51°12′52″N 0°22′46″E		1363011	Upload Photo	Q26644867
Linden Lea	II	Chidley Cross Road			19 April 1985	TQ6622148783; 51°12′51″N 0°22′43″E		1299829	Upload Photo	Q26587189
St Anns Cottage	II	Chidley Cross Road			19 April 1985	TQ6620548769; 51°12′50″N 0°22′42″E		1070730	Upload Photo	Q26325048
The Bullens	II	Chidley Cross Road			19 April 1985	TQ6628448857; 51°12′53″N 0°22′46″E		1185058	Upload Photo	Q26480368
105, Church Lane	II	105, Church Lane, Old Peckham			19 April 1985	TQ6619551842; 51°14′30″N 0°22′46″E		1185207	Upload Photo	Q26480520
26 Church Lane	II	26, Church Lane, TN12 5JH			19 April 1985	TQ6718349263; 51°13′05″N 0°23′33″E		1185078	Upload Photo	Q26480386
Church of St Michael	II*	Church Lane, Old Peckham	church building		25 August 1959	TQ6616152169; 51°14′40″N 0°22′45″E		1363012	Church of St Michael More images	Q7594761
Fant Farmhouse	II	Church Lane			1 August 1952	TQ6721749268; 51°13′05″N 0°23′35″E		1070731	Upload Photo	Q26325051
Two Table Tombs by South Porch and Table Tomb by Lych Gate in Church of St Michael's Churchyard	II	Church Lane, Old Peckham			19 April 1985	TQ6615552145; 51°14′39″N 0°22′45″E		1185204	Upload Photo	Q26480517
14, Hale Street	II	14, Hale Street, Tonbridge, TN12 5HL			19 April 1985	TQ6735148779; 51°12′49″N 0°23′41″E		1299882	Upload Photo	Q26587237
140-144, Hale Street	II	140-144, Hale Street			1 August 1952	TQ6730349307; 51°13′06″N 0°23′39″E		1070734	Upload Photo	Q26325061
Barn to South West of Boroughs Oak Farmhouse	II	Hale Street, Boroughs Oak Farm			19 April 1985	TQ6733449875; 51°13′25″N 0°23′42″E		1185234	Upload Photo	Q26480546
Barn to South of Boroughs Oak Farmhouse	II	Hale Street, Boroughs Oak Farm			19 April 1985	TQ6736149881; 51°13′25″N 0°23′43″E		1070732	Upload Photo	Q26325054
Boroughs Oak Farmhouse	II	Hale Street			1 August 1952	TQ6737149923; 51°13′26″N 0°23′44″E		1363013	Upload Photo	Q26644868
Cornerways	II	Hale Street			19 April 1985	TQ6730749293; 51°13′06″N 0°23′39″E		1299751	Upload Photo	Q26587117
Hale Place Cottage	II	Hale Street			19 April 1985	TQ6729048944; 51°12′55″N 0°23′38″E		1363015	Upload Photo	Q26644870
Hale Street Farmhouse	II	Hale Street			19 April 1985	TQ6731449359; 51°13′08″N 0°23′40″E		1299744	Upload Photo	Q26587111
The Old Well House	II	Hale Street			17 May 1974	TQ6727049408; 51°13′10″N 0°23′38″E		1363014	Upload Photo	Q26644869
The Orchard	II	186, Hale Street, TN12 5JB			19 April 1985	TQ6732749479; 51°13′12″N 0°23′41″E		1070733	Upload Photo	Q26325057
Wagon Shed to South of Boroughs Oak Farmhouse	II	Hale Street, Boroughs Oak Farm			19 April 1985	TQ6736849870; 51°13′25″N 0°23′44″E		1185227	Upload Photo	Q26480541
Barn 15 Yards North West of Forge Gate Farmhouse	II	Maidstone Road			19 April 1985	TQ6554652514; 51°14′52″N 0°22′14″E		1070735	Upload Photo	Q26325064
Forge Gate Cottage	II	Maidstone Road			19 April 1985	TQ6558252520; 51°14′52″N 0°22′16″E		1185277	Upload Photo	Q26480590
Forge Gate Farmhouse	II*	Maidstone Road			19 April 1985	TQ6555552494; 51°14′51″N 0°22′15″E		1185270	Upload Photo	Q17546891
Goose Green Cottage	II	Maidstone Road			19 April 1985	TQ6511251245; 51°14′11″N 0°21′50″E		1363016	Upload Photo	Q26644871
Hextall House	II	Martins Lane			19 April 1985	TQ6620550479; 51°13′45″N 0°22′45″E		1070699	Upload Photo	Q26324956
4, Old Road	II	4, Old Road			19 April 1985	TQ6674848529; 51°12′42″N 0°23′09″E		1299665	Upload Photo	Q26587040
79, Old Road	II	79, Old Road			19 April 1985	TQ6716248640; 51°12′45″N 0°23′31″E		1070700	Upload Photo	Q26324959
Strettit Place	II	Old Road			19 April 1985	TQ6685248514; 51°12′41″N 0°23′15″E		1070701	Upload Photo	Q26324962
Triumphal Arch in Mereworth Park	II	Park Road, Mereworth Park			1 August 1952	TQ6689752274; 51°14′43″N 0°23′23″E		1070702	Upload Photo	Q26324965
91 and 93, Pound Road	II	91 and 93, Pound Road			19 April 1985	TQ6645148968; 51°12′56″N 0°22′55″E		1366084	Upload Photo	Q26647716
Coults House	II	Pound Road			19 April 1985	TQ6666048733; 51°12′49″N 0°23′05″E		1185413	Upload Photo	Q26480728
The Coults	II	Pound Road			19 April 1985	TQ6667148720; 51°12′48″N 0°23′06″E		1070703	Upload Photo	Q26324968
Trombolyn	II	Pound Road			19 April 1985	TQ6652248810; 51°12′51″N 0°22′58″E		1070704	Upload Photo	Q26324971
Dower House	II*	Roydon Hall Road			1 August 1952	TQ6643251704; 51°14′25″N 0°22′58″E		1299613	Upload Photo	Q17547070
Main Gates and Flanking Walls to Roydon Hall	II	Roydon Hall Road, Roydon Hall			19 April 1985	TQ6651051817; 51°14′28″N 0°23′03″E		1363038	Upload Photo	Q26644889
North Lodge to Roydon Hall	II	Roydon Hall Road, Roydon Hall			19 April 1985	TQ6651551831; 51°14′29″N 0°23′03″E		1185583	Upload Photo	Q26480900
Roydon Hall	II*	Roydon Hall Road	house		1 August 1952	TQ6658151711; 51°14′25″N 0°23′06″E		1363037	Roydon Hall More images	Q17547104
St Michaels Cottage	II	Roydon Hall Road			19 April 1985	TQ6645352042; 51°14′36″N 0°23′00″E		1185509	Upload Photo	Q26480827
St Michaels House	II	Roydon Hall Road			19 April 1985	TQ6644652020; 51°14′35″N 0°23′00″E		1070705	Upload Photo	Q26324974
Stables at Roydon Hall	II	Roydon Hall Road, Roydon Hall			19 April 1985	TQ6655851686; 51°14′24″N 0°23′05″E		1070706	Upload Photo	Q26324977
Wall 50 Yards to the East of Roydon Hall	II	Roydon Hall Road, Roydon Hall			19 April 1985	TQ6664051717; 51°14′25″N 0°23′09″E		1185574	Upload Photo	Q26480893
Barn 50 Yards to North of Mount Pleasant Farmhouse	II	Seven Mile Lane, Mount Pleasant Farm			19 April 1985	TQ6623551248; 51°14′10″N 0°22′47″E		1299586	Upload Photo	Q26586974
Court Lodge Farmhouse	II	Seven Mile Lane			1 August 1952	TQ6621551675; 51°14′24″N 0°22′47″E		1070707	Upload Photo	Q26324981
Little Moat Cottage	II	Seven Mile Lane			19 April 1985	TQ6597151353; 51°14′14″N 0°22′34″E		1363039	Upload Photo	Q26644890
Mount Pleasant Farmhouse	II	Seven Mile Lane			19 April 1985	TQ6627551198; 51°14′09″N 0°22′49″E		1070708	Upload Photo	Q26324984
Ippenbury House	II	Smither's Lane			19 April 1985	TQ6745749293; 51°13′06″N 0°23′47″E		1363040	Upload Photo	Q26644891
1, Smithers Lane	II	1, Smithers Lane			19 April 1985	TQ6732649331; 51°13′07″N 0°23′40″E		1299599	Upload Photo	Q26586983
22, Smithers Lane	II	22, Smithers Lane			19 April 1985	TQ6748549271; 51°13′05″N 0°23′49″E		1185661	Upload Photo	Q26480971
23, Smithers Lane	II	23, Smithers Lane			19 April 1985	TQ6743949294; 51°13′06″N 0°23′46″E		1070709	Upload Photo	Q26324987
25 and 27, Smithers Lane	II	25 and 27, Smithers Lane			19 April 1985	TQ6744349294; 51°13′06″N 0°23′46″E		1185652	Upload Photo	Q26480962
119-125, Snoll Hatch Road	II	119-125, Snoll Hatch Road			19 April 1985	TQ6643148285; 51°12′34″N 0°22′53″E		1363041	Upload Photo	Q26644892
38-44, Snoll Hatch Road	II	38-44, Snoll Hatch Road			19 April 1985	TQ6666348498; 51°12′41″N 0°23′05″E		1299570	Upload Photo	Q26586959
The Post House	II	Snoll Hatch Road			19 April 1985	TQ6639248300; 51°12′35″N 0°22′51″E		1185662	Upload Photo	Q26480972
Addlestead House	II	Tonbridge Road			19 April 1985	TQ6600848532; 51°12′43″N 0°22′31″E		1070710	Upload Photo	Q26324990
Barn 20 Yards to South East of Addlestead House	II	Tonbridge Road			19 April 1985	TQ6603548505; 51°12′42″N 0°22′33″E		1070711	Upload Photo	Q26324993
Granary/wagon Shed to South West of Little Mill	II	Tonbridge Road			19 April 1985	TQ6574348179; 51°12′32″N 0°22′17″E		1363042	Upload Photo	Q26644893
Little Mill	II	Tonbridge Road			1 August 1952	TQ6574348205; 51°12′32″N 0°22′17″E		1185675	Upload Photo	Q26480984
Oaklands	II	Tonbridge Road			19 April 1985	TQ6568848083; 51°12′29″N 0°22′14″E		1070712	Upload Photo	Q26324996
The Man of Kent Public House	II	Tonbridge Road	pub		25 August 1959	TQ6573348140; 51°12′30″N 0°22′16″E		1185745	The Man of Kent Public House More images	Q26481044
Woodside Cottage	II	Tonbridge Road			19 April 1985	TQ6558847980; 51°12′25″N 0°22′09″E		1185752	Upload Photo	Q26481051

== See also ==
- Grade I listed buildings in Kent
- Grade II* listed buildings in Kent

== Sources ==
- Newman, John (2012) [1969], Kent: West and the Weald, The Buildings of England, New Haven and London: Yale University Press, ISBN 978-0-300-18509-6
