= Listed buildings in Burham =

Civil Parish in Kent, England

Burham is a village and civil parish in the Tonbridge and Malling district of Kent, England. It contains six listed buildings that are recorded in the National Heritage List for England. Of these one is grade I and five are grade II.

This list is based on the information retrieved online from Historic England.

== Key ==
Grade	Criteria
I	Buildings that are of exceptional interest
II*	Particularly important buildings of more than special interest
II	Buildings that are of special interest

== Listing ==
Name	Grade	Location	Type	Completed (Note: The date given is the date used by Historic England as significant for the initial building or that of an important part in the structure's description.)	Date designated	Grid ref. (Note: The grid reference is based on the British national grid reference system, sometimes known as OSGB36, used by the Ordnance Survey.) Geo-coordinates	Notes	Entry number (Note: The "List Entry Number" is a unique number assigned to each listed building and scheduled monument by Historic England.)	Image	Wikidata
Barn 60 Yards to the North West of Burham Church	II				25 February 1987	TQ7157462030; 51°19′53″N 0°27′41″E		1099225	Upload Photo	Q26391378
Boundary Stone of the City of Rochester	II				9 November 2001	TQ7156661272; 51°19′29″N 0°27′39″E		1389531	Upload Photo	Q26668965
Burham Court	II				25 February 1987	TQ7175162064; 51°19′54″N 0°27′50″E		1081500	Upload Photo	Q26356940
Church of St Mary the Virgin	I		church building		25 August 1959	TQ7166062008; 51°19′53″N 0°27′46″E		1070523	Church of St Mary the Virgin More images	Q7594291
Barn at Burham Hill	II	Hill Road			25 February 1987	TQ7305563181; 51°20′29″N 0°29′00″E		1070524	Upload Photo	Q26324484
Robin Hood Public House	II	Hill Road	pub		25 February 1987	TQ7341162804; 51°20′16″N 0°29′17″E		1099229	Robin Hood Public House More images	Q26391383

== See also ==
- Grade I listed buildings in Kent
- Grade II* listed buildings in Kent

== Sources ==
- Newman, John (2012) [1969], Kent: West and the Weald, The Buildings of England, New Haven and London: Yale University Press, ISBN 978-0-300-18509-6
