= Church of St Peter and St Paul, Trottiscliffe =

Church in Trottiscliffe, England

- Trottiscliffe Parish Church
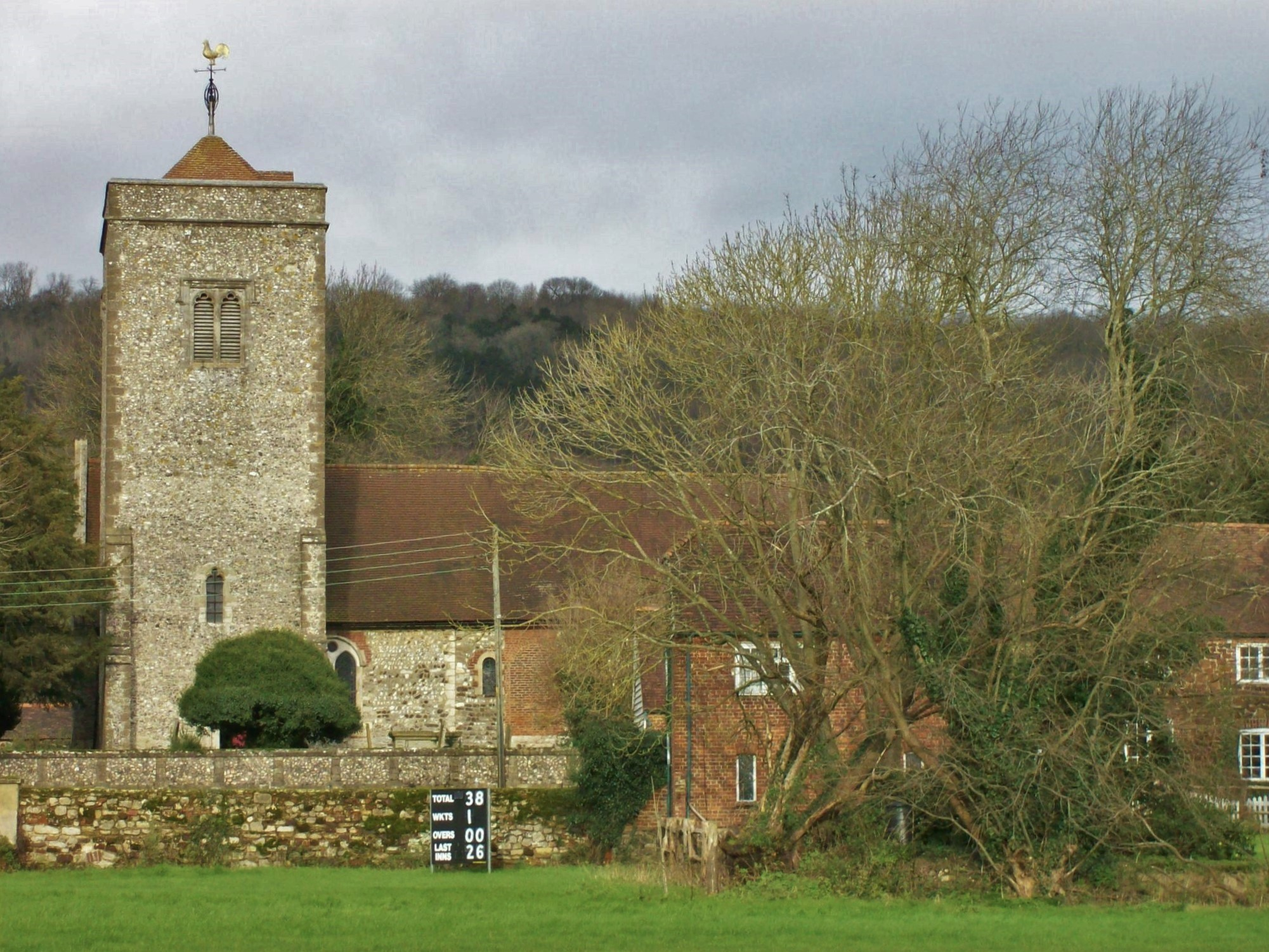
- Church of St Peter and St Paul, Trottiscliffe
- 51°19′13″N 0°21′40″E
- OS grid reference: TQ6463660538
- Location: Church Lane, Trottiscliffe, Kent ME19
- Country: England
- Language: English
- Denomination: Church of England
- Previous denomination: Roman Catholicism
- Website: Official website

History
- Status: Parish church
- Founded: c.1080
- Dedication: Saint Peter and Saint Paul

Architecture
- Functional status: Active
- Heritage designation: UK Grade I
- Architectural type: Church
- Style: Norman
- Years built: c. 1080
- Groundbreaking: c. 1080
- Completed: c. 1200

Specifications
- Materials: flint, ironstone, Kentish ragstone, tufa,

Administration
- Province: Canterbury
- Diocese: Rochester
- Archdeaconry: Tonbridge
- Deanery: Malling
- Benefice: Birling: All Saints; Addington: St Margaret; Ryarsh: St Martin; Trottiscliffe: St Peter and St Paul
- Parish: Trottiscliffe

Clergy
- Rector: Interregnum

History
- Founded: c.1080

Listed Building – Grade I
- Official name: Church of St Peter and St Paul
- Type: Listed building
- Designated: 25 August 1959
- Reference no.: 1236191

The Church of St Peter and St Paul is an active Anglican parish church in Church Lane, Trottiscliffe, in the Borough of Tonbridge and Malling, Kent, England. It is situated below the North Downs on the lowest levels of the Lower Chalk, above a spring on the Gault clay top at approximately 280 feet above ordnance datum.

The church dates from the late 11th century and is dedicated to saints Peter and Paul. It is a Pilgrim Church as it is located near to the Pilgrims' Way, the historical route purportedly taken by pilgrims from Winchester in Hampshire, to the shrine of Thomas Becket at Canterbury in Kent.

The church has been recorded in the National Heritage List for England as a designated Grade I listed building since 1959 and is also notable for its large pulpit, which stood in Westminster Abbey until 1820.

== History ==
=== High Middle Ages ===
Construction of the church began during the Norman era to the design of an unknown architect. The opus spicatum masonry, as well as a reference in the Domesday Book, suggest that the church dates from c. 1080. It was built by the Bishop of Rochester, probably Gundulf, who lived in a house on the site of the neighbouring manor in the 11th century.

=== Late Middle Ages ===
The south doorway into the nave and the north and south lancets at the west end of the nave were added in the 13th century. The south window may also have been constructed at this time but this is uncertain as it was completely rebuilt in the 19th century. During the early 14th century, possibly under Bishop Hamo Hethe, new stained glass windows were installed in the south-east side of the chancel (which had a trefoil-headed piscina just below it to the east) and the north-east side of the nave. The 15th century saw the bell tower added to the south-west of the building.

=== 18th and 19th centuries ===
During the 18th and early 19th centuries, repairs were carried out using brick. In the late 19th century, the four-light window on the west side and west wall were rebuilt with flint from local quarries, the three-light window on the east side was replaced, repairs were carried out using Bath stone and Portland stone, and the churchyard was extended on the north-eastern aspect.

=== Post-war ===
On 25 August 1959, the church was designated as a Grade I listed building, meaning it is considered to be a "building of exceptional interest" by English Heritage. It has been assigned National Heritage List for England (NHLE) reference number 1236191 and English Heritage Legacy ID 427136. As of February 2001, it was one of 38 Grade I listed buildings, and 1,291 listed buildings of all grades, in the district of Tonbridge and Malling – the local government district in which Trottiscliffe is situated. In 1975, the flint and ragstone south boundary wall was rebuilt.

=== Present day ===
Administratively, St Peter and St Paul is a constituent of a united benefice with three neighbouring parish churches, forming the BART Group. BART is an acronym for the four villages in which the churches are situated:

Birling: All Saints
Addington: St Margaret
Ryarsh: St Martin
Trottiscliffe: St Peter and St Paul

The church is in the deanery of Malling, the archdeaconry of Tonbridge, the Diocese of Rochester and the Province of Canterbury. It continues to be an active parish church, holding a communion service on the second Sunday of each month, a morning worship service on the fourth Sunday of each month and is open daily for visitors. St Peter and St Paul is currently in an interregnum following the retirement of Reverend Dr. Linda Shuker.

== Description ==
=== Exterior ===
St Peter and St Paul is an early Norman church that consists of a simple tower-nave-chancel layout – a rectangular building with an added tower that covers an area of 217 square metres.

==== Nave and chancel ====
The nave and chancel appear to have been constructed on a continuous foundation of large blocks, some of which are sarsen. The original opus spicatum masonry is made from whole flints, ironstone (from the Folkestone Beds) and Kentish ragstone. The dressings are made of tufa and the rere-arches of the original windows are greensand. Bath stone, Portland stone and brick was used for repairs in the 18th and 19th centuries while cement and thin tiles have been used for more recent repair work. The west end of the nave has a doorway and lancets that probably date from the 13th century. The chancel is only slightly smaller than the nave and there is no chancel arch. The western window on the south side of the chancel is unusually far to the west and has been rebuilt externally. The nave and chancel have a continuous rafter, collar and soulace roof that may date from the 14th century. The south wall of the nave adjoins the north wall of the tower.

==== Tower ====
The tower, and porch beneath it, probably date from the 15th century. It has a barrel vault through its north-east side to allow access to an earlier south door, two contemporary buttresses on the south wall and a ragstone doorway and dressings. The tower has small trefoiled windows on the south and west sides and three two-light perpendicular cinquefoil-headed windows, under square hood moulds, on the upper part of the tower on the east, south and west sides. It has a parapet and a low pyramid roof.

The Church of St Peter and St Paul, Trottiscliffe, and its environs
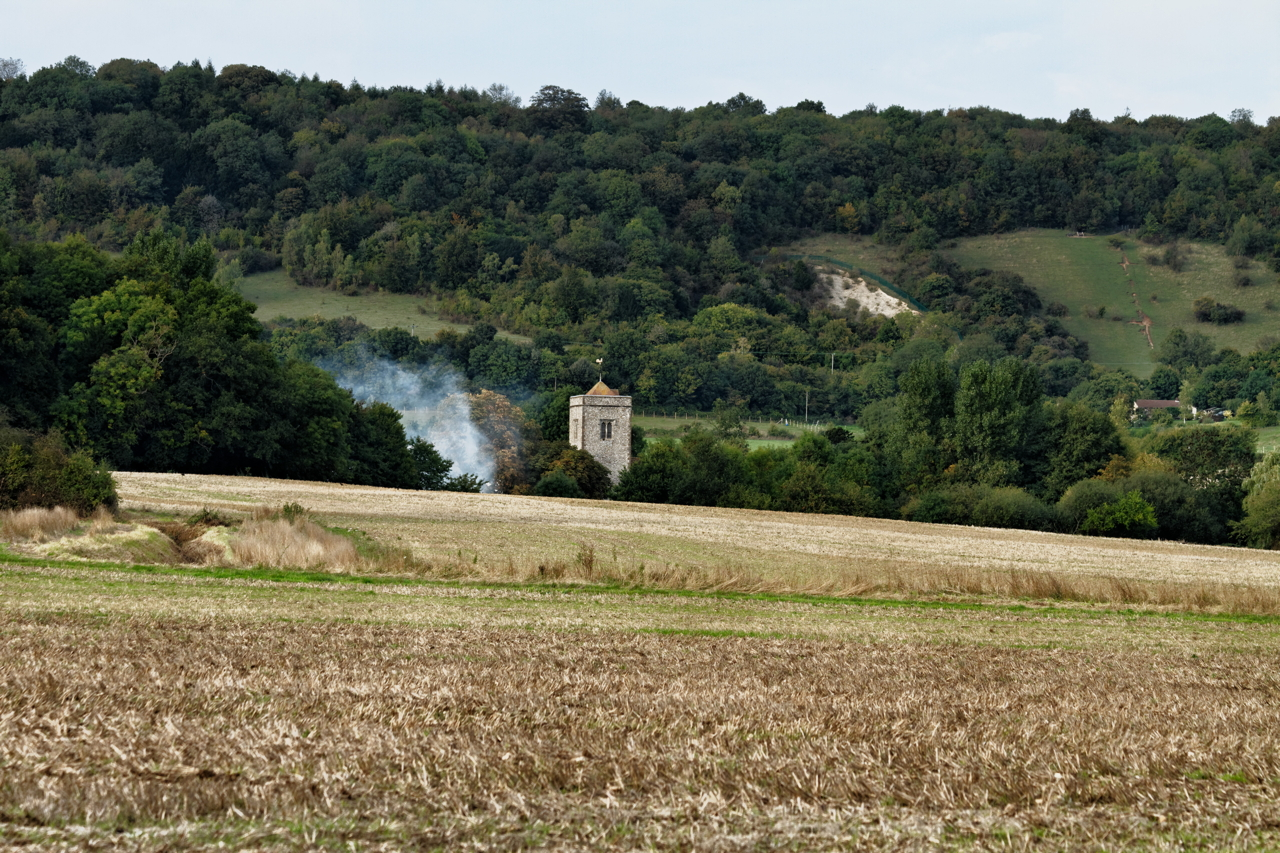
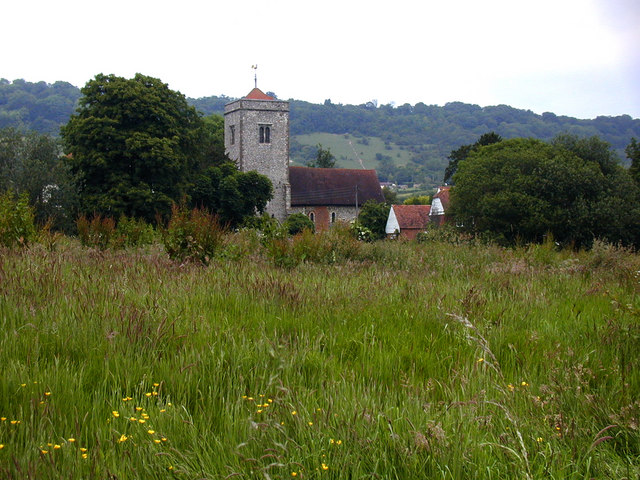
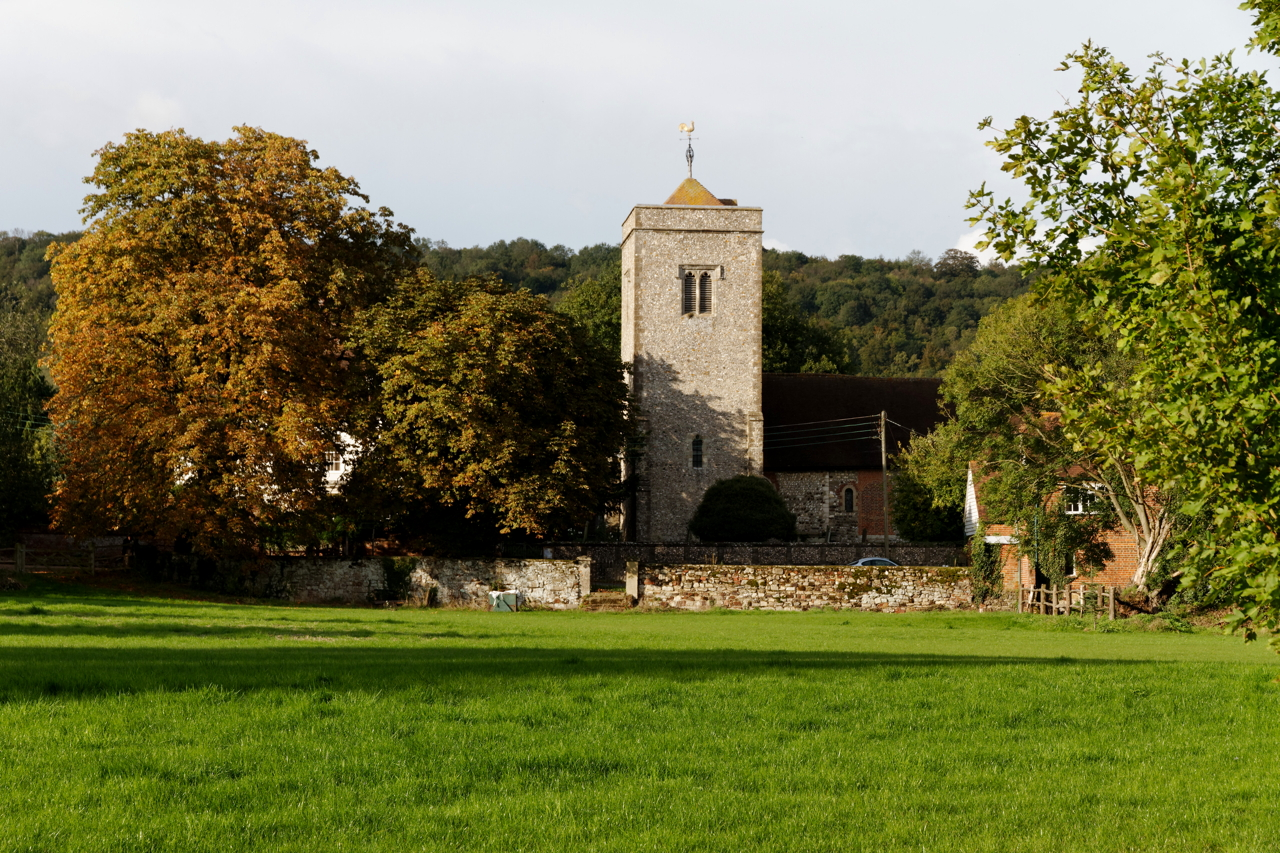
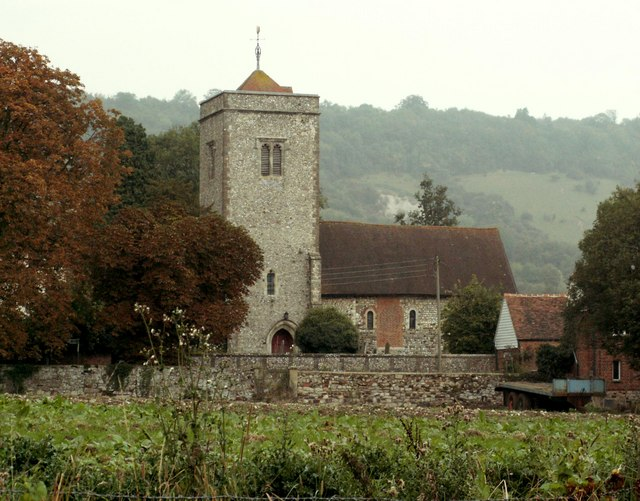

=== Interior ===
==== Pulpit ====
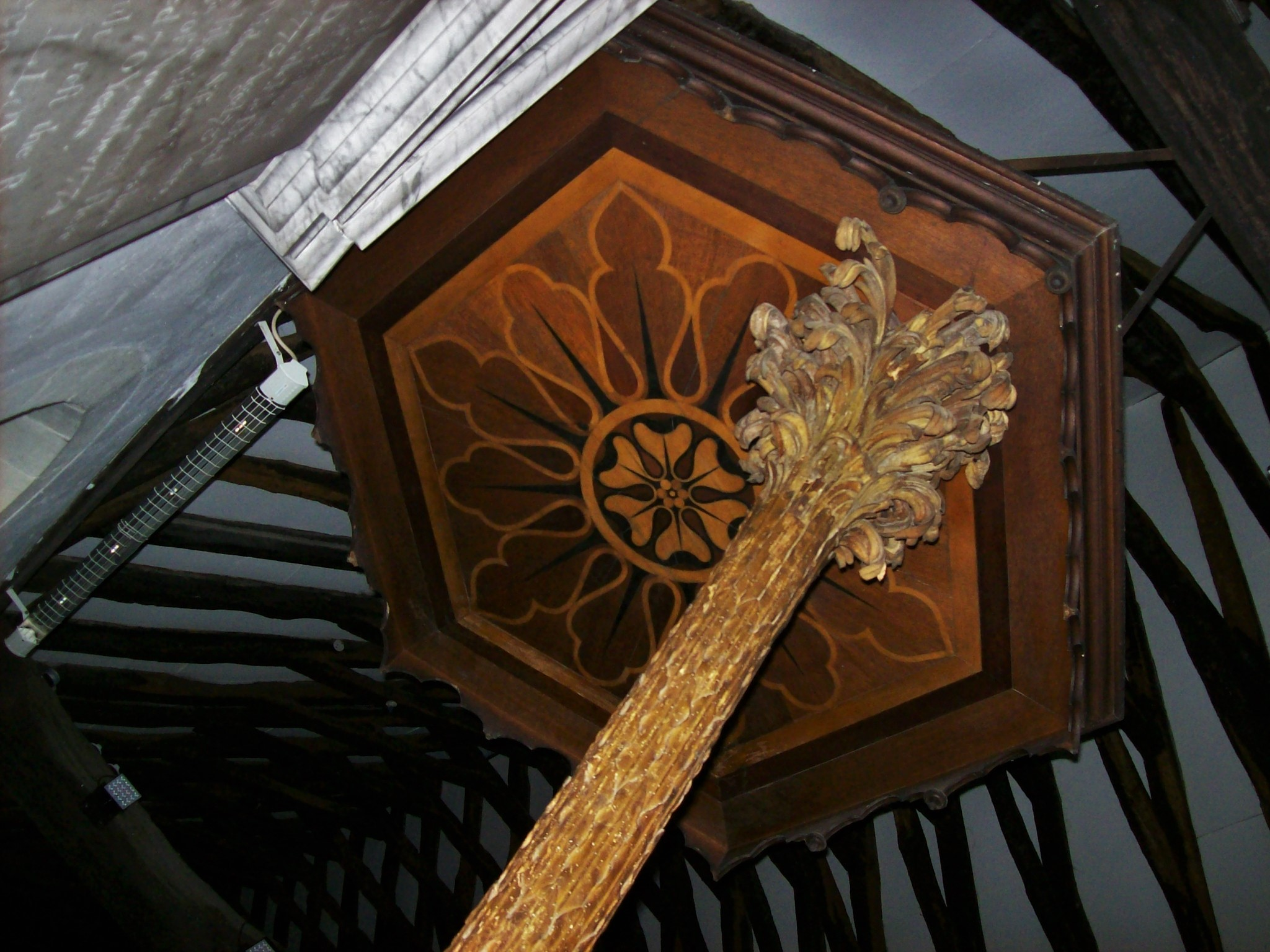
The pulpit of St Peter and St Paul, Trottiscliffe, which originally stood in Westminster Abbey.

The pulpit, stairs and sounding board at St Peter and St Paul date from 1775. It was originally constructed for Westminster Abbey and was designed by abbey surveyor Henry Keene. In 1820, the pulpit was removed from the abbey to create space for the coronation of George IV, which took place in 1821. The pulpit was given to the owner of Court Lodge (the Bishop’s Palace until the end of the 13th century), adjacent to St Peter and St Paul, by abbey surveyor Benjamin Dean Wyatt and given to the church in 1824.

==== Bells ====
The tower holds one William Hatch bell cast in 1639 and a service bell cast in 1853 by C&G Mears of the Whitechapel Bell Foundry. Prior to this there had been at least three bells.

==== Monuments and memorials ====
There are numerous monuments within the church, including war memorials dedicated to the residents of Trottiscliffe who lost their lives during World War I and World War II and a brass monument, dated 1483, in front of the chancel step. There are burial vaults under the church.

==== Stained glass ====
The church has a wide selection of stained glass. The original glass in the tracery of the north nave window consists of canopies with a quatrefoil above that depicts a figure of the Trinity. The stained glass in the west window is by Ward and Hughes and dates from 1885. The late twentieth century stained glass by Keith and Judy Hill depicts Bishop Gundulf.

The interior of the Church of St Peter and St Paul, Trottiscliffe
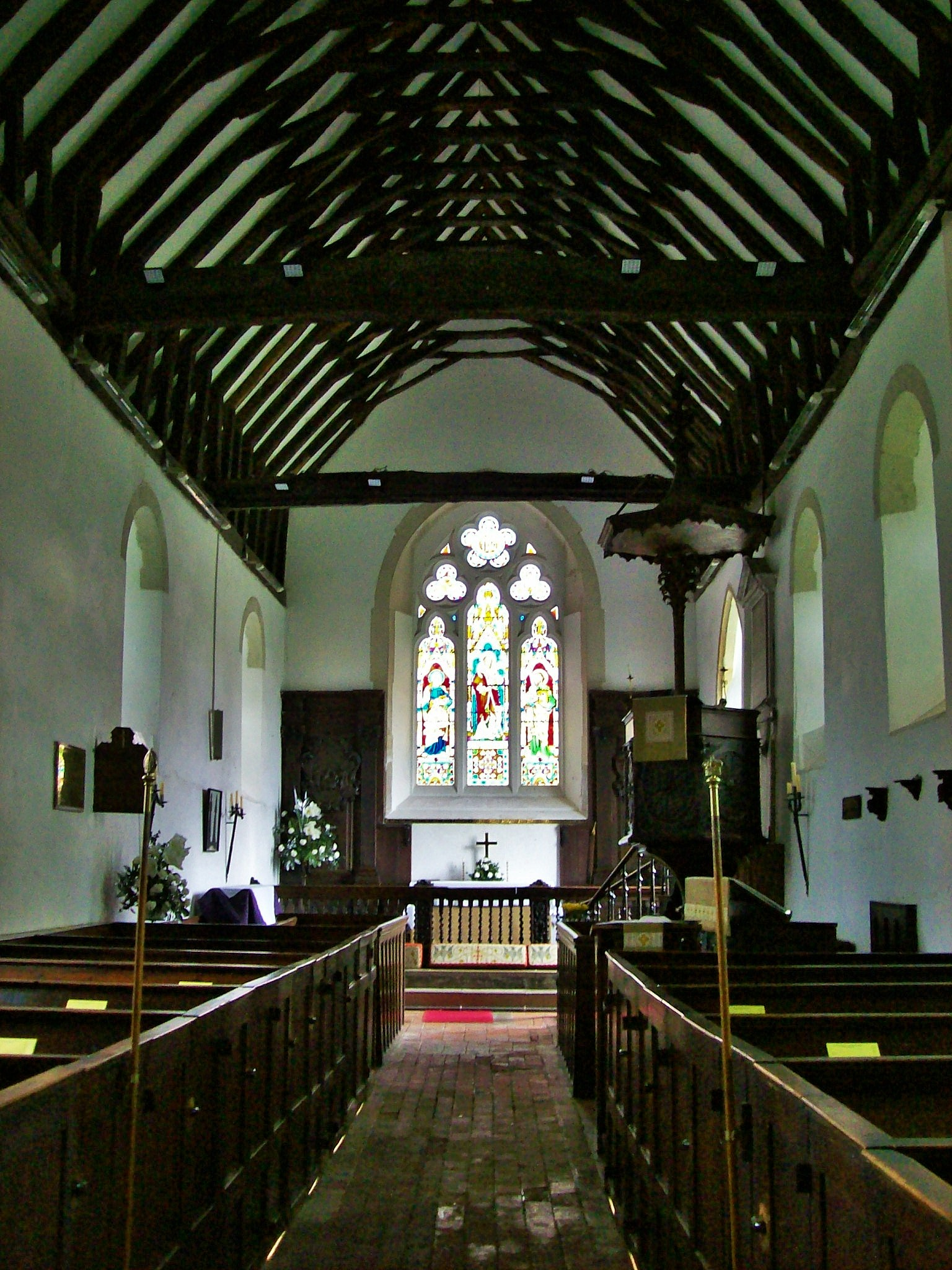
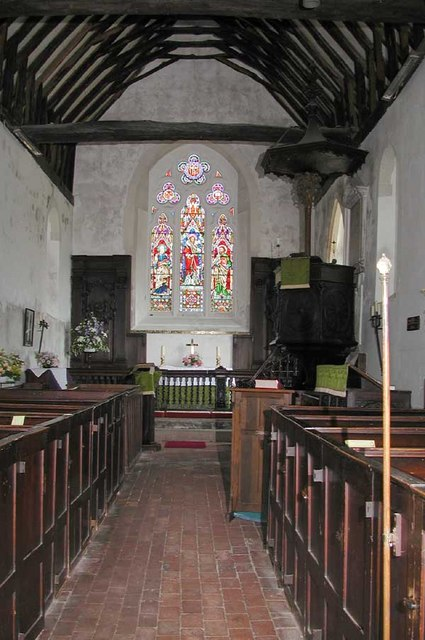
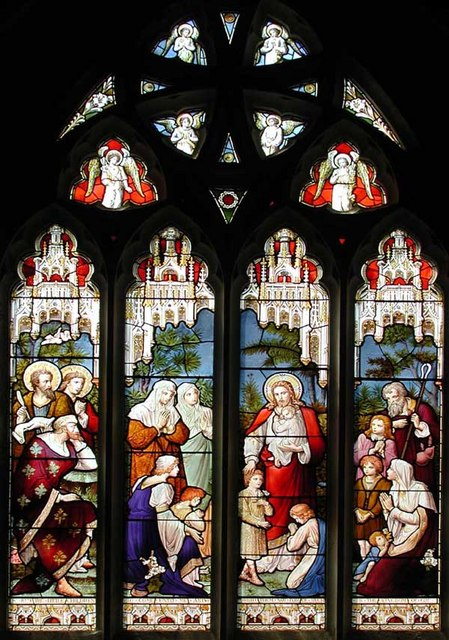
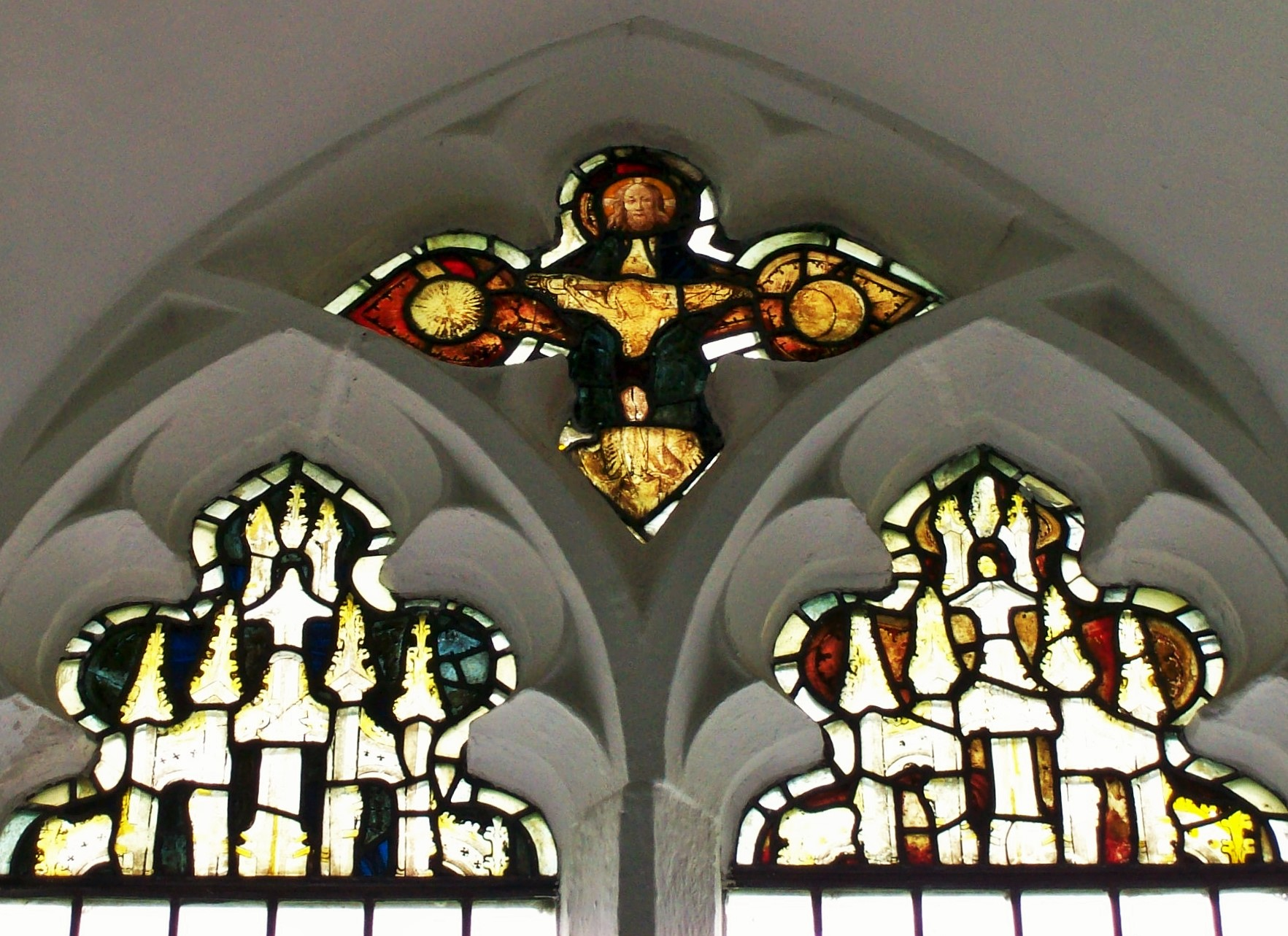

The octagonal baptismal font may date from the 14th century and the oak reredos, twisted baluster altar rails and box pews date from the 18th century.

== Churchyard ==
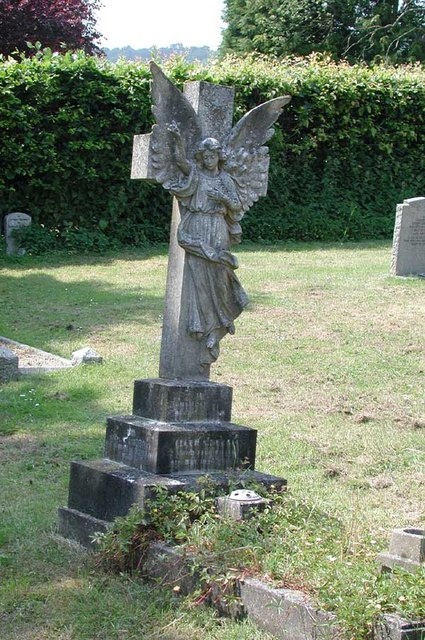
The churchyard.

The churchyard consists of a small rectangular area around the church, which was extended on the north-eastern side c. 1875. The artist Graham Sutherland (1903–1980), a former resident of Trottiscliffe, is buried in the north side of the churchyard.

== See also ==
- Grade I listed buildings in Tonbridge and Malling
- List of places of worship in Tonbridge and Malling
- Trottiscliffe
