= William Barnard (bishop) =

Irish Anglican bishop

William Barnard (1697 – 10 January 1768) was an Anglican bishop, Bishop of Derry from 1747 until his death.

Barnard was educated at Westminster School and Trinity College, Cambridge, where he graduated B.A. in 1721. He became vicar of St. Bride's, Fleet Street in 1729, and prebendary of Westminster in 1732. He was appointed Dean of Rochester in 1743, he became Bishop of Raphoe in 1744, and Bishop of Derry in 1747. He was buried in Westminster Abbey.
