= Burham =

Village in Kent, England

Coordinates: 51.329710°N 0.483080°E

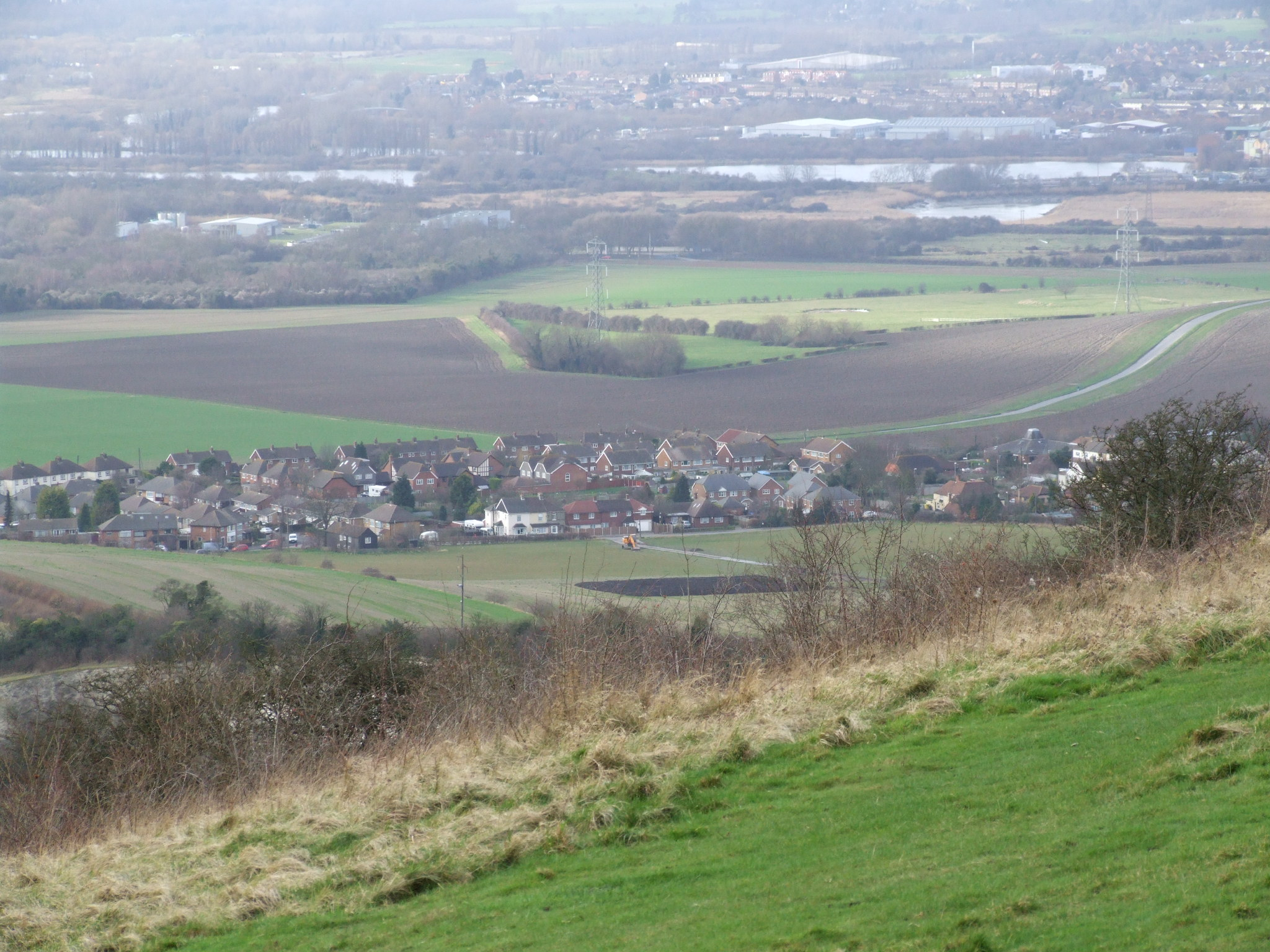
- Burham

- Location within Kent
- Population: 1,195 (2011 Census)
- District: Tonbridge and Malling
- Shire county: Kent
- Region: South East
- Country: England
- Sovereign state: United Kingdom
- Post town: Rochester
- Postcode district: ME1
- Police: Kent
- Fire: Kent
- Ambulance: South East Coast
- UK Parliament: Chatham and Aylesford
- Website: Burham Parish Council

Burham is a village and civil parish in the borough of Tonbridge and Malling in Kent, England. According to the 2001 census, it had a population of 1,251, decreasing to 1,195 at the 2011 Census. The village is near the Medway towns.

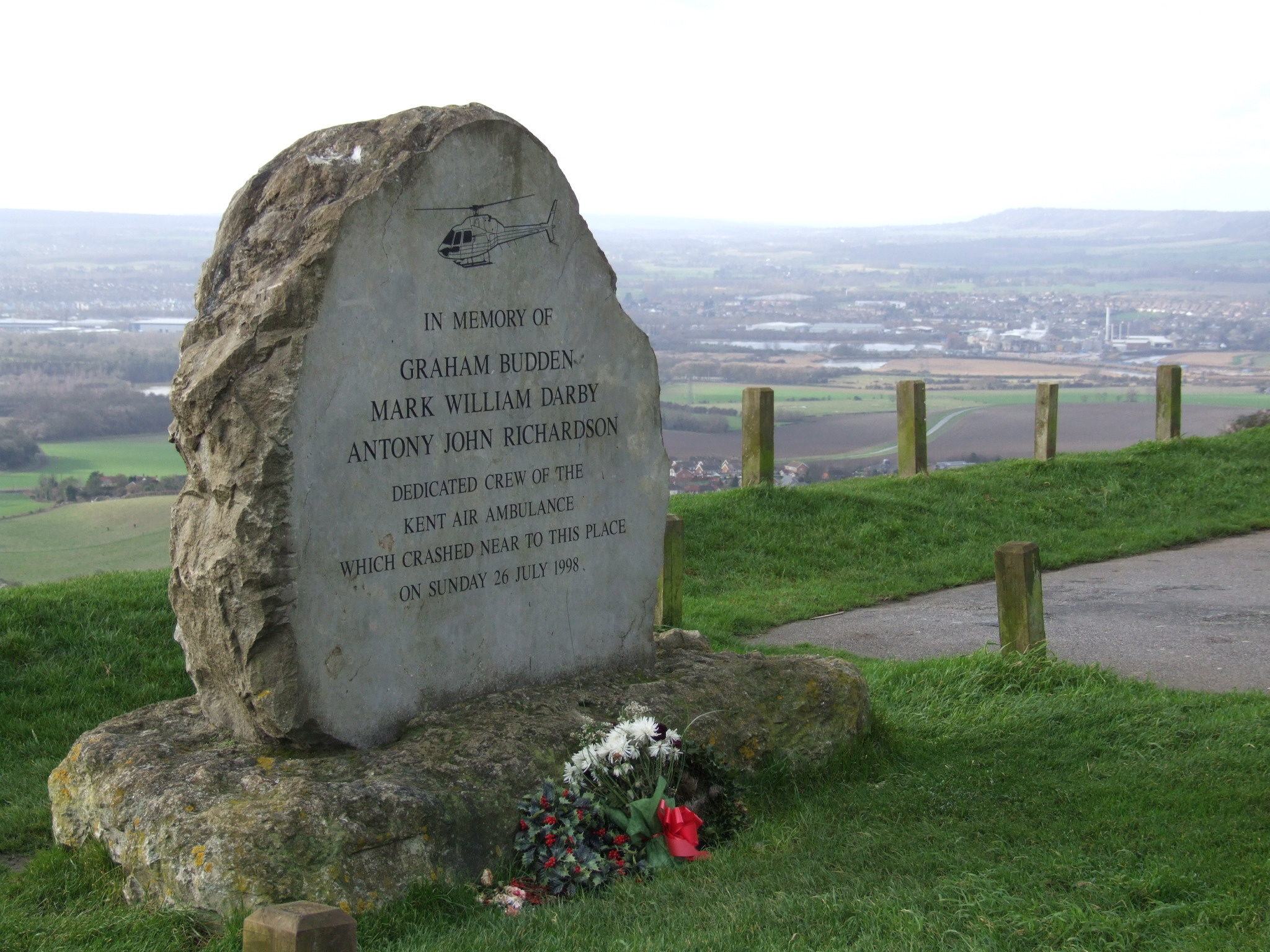
Memorial on Blue Bell Hill

The history of Burham can be traced to Roman times. AD43 saw the Battle of the Medway at the crossing point on the River Medway, where Burham is now, when the invading Roman legions, advancing west across Kent, were confronted by a massed army of the ancient British tribes. The Roman victory altered the course of history in Britain, and the remains of Roman buildings have been found in Burham and the neighbouring village of Eccles.

There has been a Settlement in Burham since Saxon times, "ham" being the Saxon word for "settlement" — the "Bur" part of the name comes from "burgh", or borough, referring to the borough of Rochester. The name "Burham" means "the village near the borough".

In the 11th century Burham belonged to Leofwine Godwinson, brother of King Harold. He was killed along with his brother at the Battle of Hastings in 1066. It is listed as having six sulings (about 240 acres) of land. There were two major farms, 15 "villeins" each farming 30 acres (120,000 m^{2}) and 20 "borderers" each farming about 5 acres (20,000 m^{2}). There was a church and a mill with woodland sufficient to support 20 hogs. The medieval church of St Mary is now redundant and stands on the riverbank 1 kilometre (0.6 mi) to the west of the village. It is now cared for by the Churches Conservation Trust having been saved from dereliction by the Friends of Friendless Churches in the 1950s.

About 1830 Burham became a "cement village" on the Medway with the establishment of the local cement industry, after the discovery of the manufacturing technique for Portland cement (so called because of its resemblance to Portland stone).

By 1841 the village's population had grown to 380 and increased to a maximum of 1,725 in 1901. By 2021 it was about 1,300.

== Helicopter crash ==
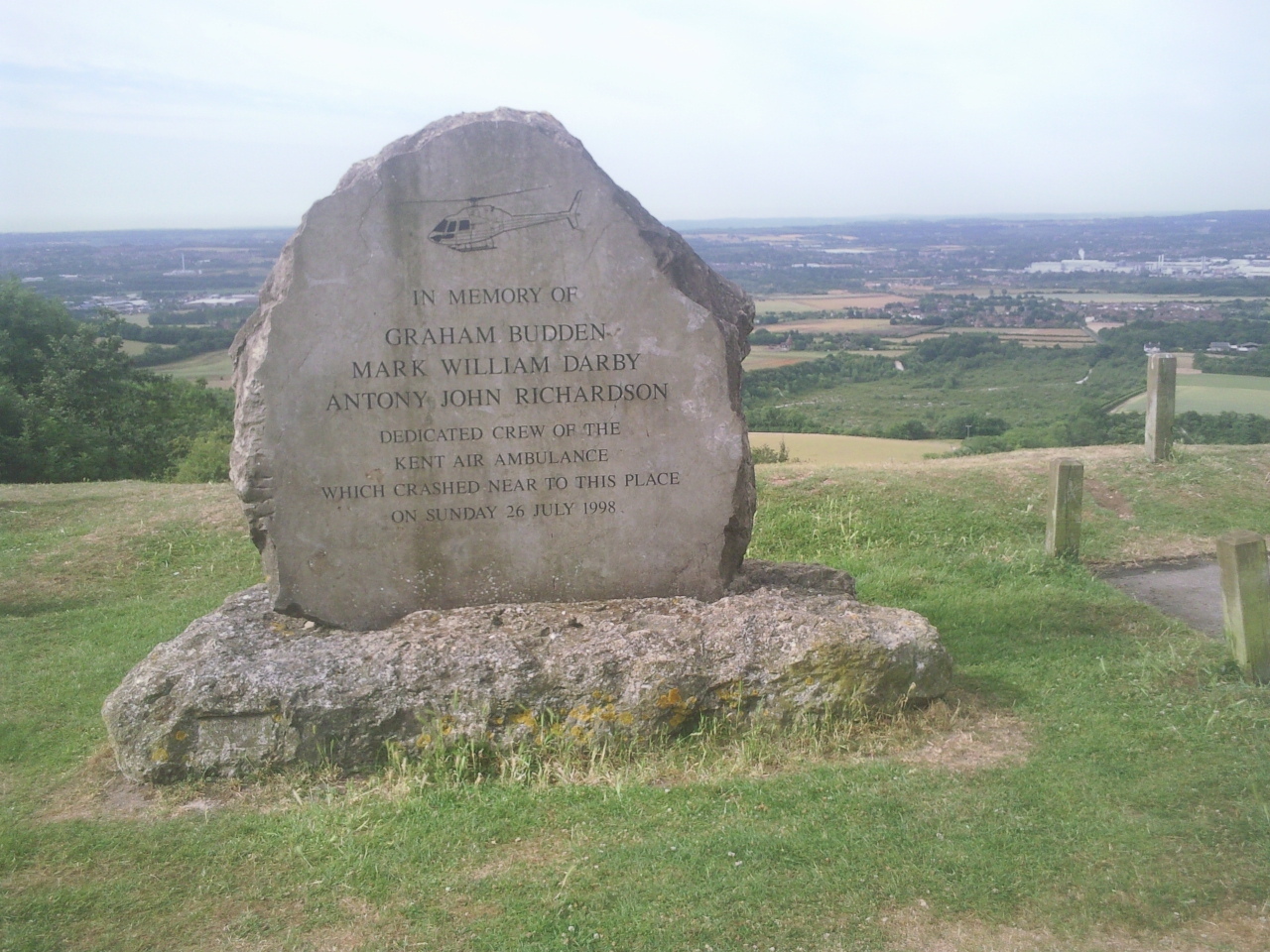
Memorial to the victims of the helicopter crash.

On the 26 July 1998, the air ambulance, a Eurocopter AS355 Twin Squirrel, registration G-MASK, crashed in good weather after colliding with power cables near Burham while returning to Rochester Airport following an aborted call to attend a road accident. All three crew – the pilot, Graham Budden, and two paramedics, Tony Richardson and Mark Darby – were killed as the helicopter burst into flames on impact.

Initial investigation established no cause for the crash, due to the fireball produced on impact. Initially the pilot's employers, Police Aviation Services, denied liability. On 19 February 2004, following a civil case brought by the pilot's widow to the High Court in Manchester, it was ruled that the crash was caused by mechanical failure not, as had been suggested, flying low for fun, and ordered compensation to be paid.

A memorial to the crew is located at the Blue Bell Hill picnic site, close to the scene of the crash.

== See also ==
- Listed buildings in Burham
