= East Peckham =

Village and parish in Kent, England

Coordinates: 51.22°N 0.38°E

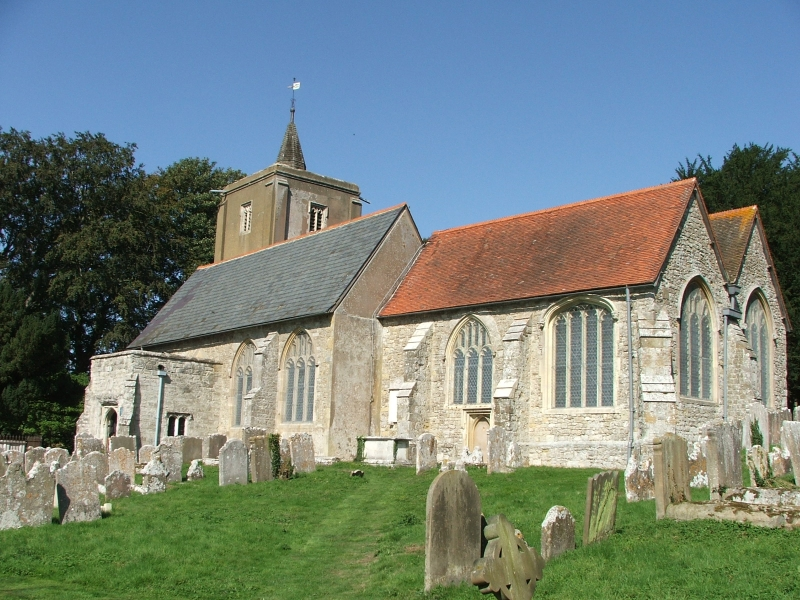
- St Michael's Church

- Location within Kent
- Area: 12.88 km^{2} (4.97 sq mi)
- Population: 3,306 (2011 Census)
  - Density: 257/km^{2} (670/sq mi)
- OS grid reference: TQ662482
- District: Tonbridge and Malling
- Shire county: Kent
- Region: South East
- Country: England
- Sovereign state: United Kingdom
- Post town: Tonbridge
- Postcode district: TN12
- Dialling code: 01622
- Police: Kent
- Fire: Kent
- Ambulance: South East Coast
- UK Parliament: Tonbridge

East Peckham is a village and civil parish in Kent, England on the River Medway. The parish covers the main village as well as Hale Street and Beltring.

== History ==
At the time of the Domesday survey in 1096, about 33 households were in East Peckham, in the ancient hundred of Littlefield, Lathe of Aylesford, West Kent.

The Domesday entry for East and West Peckham reads:-

The Archbishop himself holds Pecheham, In the time of King Edward the Confessor it was taxed at six sulungs, and now six sulungs and one yoke. The arable land is ten carucates. In demesne there are two, and sixteen villeins, with fourteen borderers, having four carucates and a half. There is a church, and ten servants, and one mill, and six acres of meadow. Wood for the pannage of six hogs.
Of the land of this manor, one of the archbishop's tenants holds half a sulung, and was taxed with these six sulungs in the time of King Edward the Confessor, although it could not belong to the manor, except in the scotting, because it was free land.
Richard de Tonebridge holds of the same favour two sulungs and one yoke, and has there twenty-seven villeins, having seven carucates, and wood for the pannage of ten hogs. The whole value being four pounds. In the time of King Edward the Confessor, the manor was worth twelve pounds, when the Archbishop received it eight pounds, and now what he has is worth eight pounds.

Part of the manor of East Farleigh lay within what is now East Peckham.

Ralph Fitz Turold holds of the bishop (of Baieux) half a sulung in Estockingeberge. In the time of King Edward the Confessor, two Freemen held it, and then like now, and it is valued at twenty shillings.

There is a persistent myth that the village was originally around the far northern border with Mereworth. Sheet 80 of the First Edition One-Inch Ordnance Survey map published on 1 January 1819 shows the village as being two miles north east as St Michael's church stands on high ground there, now cared for by the Churches Conservation Trust and open daily. In the mid-nineteenth century the new parish church of the Holy Trinity was built in what had for centuries been, and likely since the first multi-family settlement arose, the parish population centre. The architects were Whichcord and Walker of Maidstone, and the foundation stone was laid on 24 October 1840.

The River Bourne joins the Medway in the south of the parish and powered a watermill, Little Mill. Another watermill on the River Medway stood at Branbridges. Large, populated parts used to flood with unusual frequency among parishes along the Medway. The East Peckham Flood Relief partnership was formed in 2003. A dam since 2005 exists on the Coult Stream at Bullen Farm. It is 160 metres (170 yd) long and 4 metres (13 ft) high and has the capacity to hold 80,000 cubic metres (18,000,000 imp gal) of floodwater. The scheme cost just over £1 million.

In 2012, a local amateur theatre group, The Russett Players, was formed in the village.

== Settlement and amenities ==
East Peckham developed from nine hamlets (Roydon, Hale Street, Beltring, Little Mill, The Pound, Snoll Hatch, The Bush, Goose Green and Chidley Cross). These straddle the River Medway. It was economically focussed on hop growing and other agriculture, in which sector plant growing remains economically important, including two garden centres. Beltring includes The Hop Farm Country Park, including outdoor cinema, escape room and two restaurants and the world's largest collection of Oast Houses. Hale Street is another residential area to the east of the main village.

Pound Road has most of the village's amenities including the primary school, Co-op convenience store and local shops.

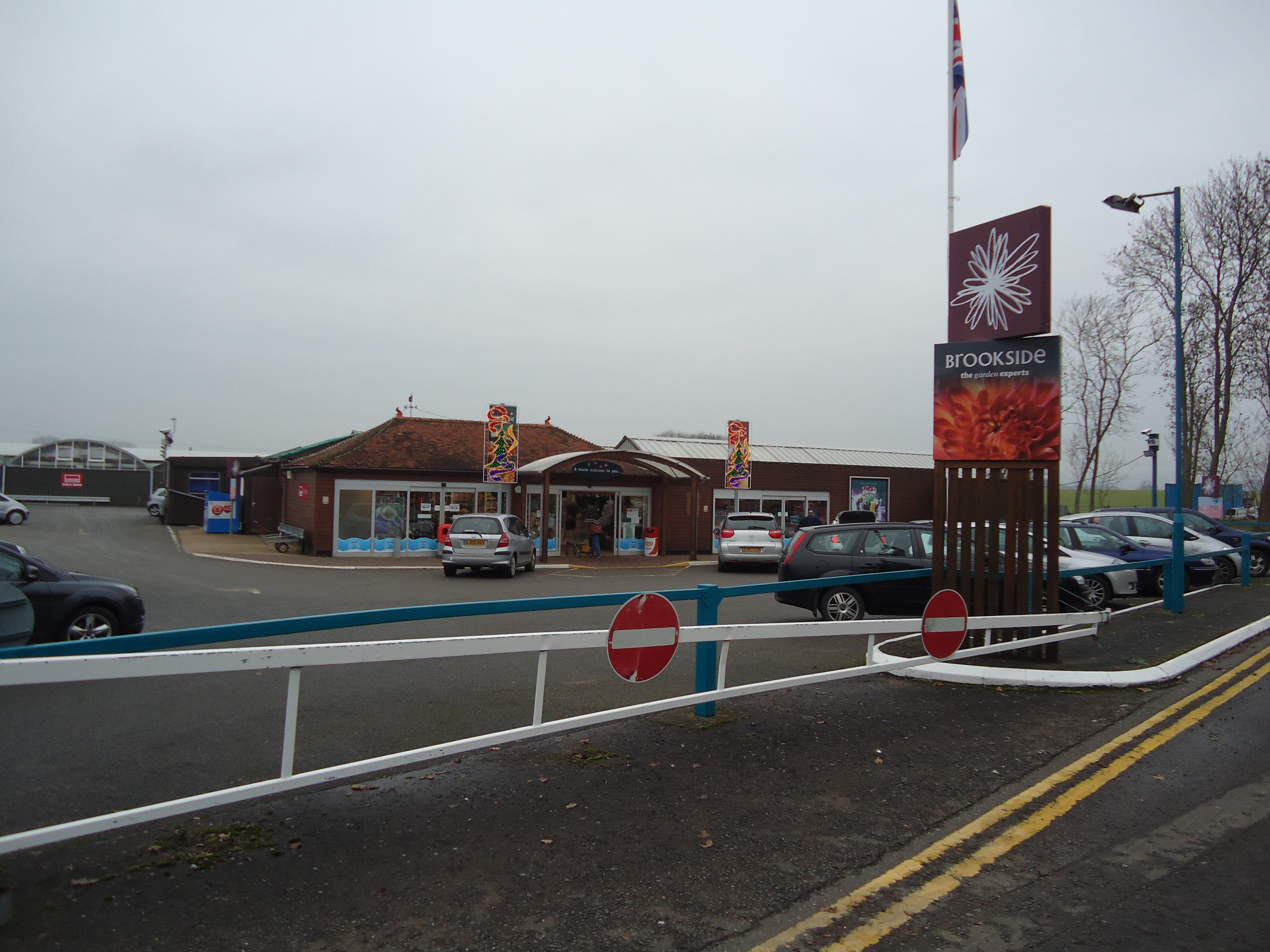
Brookside Garden Centre in 2010.

== Transport ==
East Peckham is bypassed by the A228 road which is the closest major road to the village.

The village is served by the Arriva Southern Counties routes 6 and 6A which provide connections to Tunbridge Wells and Maidstone as well as the GoBus route 208 to Tonbridge.

Beltring railway station on the Medway Valley Line is the closest rail station to East Peckham and is served by hourly Southeastern train services to Tonbridge, Maidstone and Strood.

== Notable people ==
In 1896, Walter Arnold of East Peckham, was summonsed for travelling at 8 mph (13 km/h) in a motorised vehicle, thereby exceeding the then speed limit for towns of 2 mph (3.2 km/h). He was caught by a policeman who gave chase on a bicycle. Arnold was fined 1 shilling plus costs, the first speeding conviction in the UK.

James Pimm (1798–1866) created the gin-based liqueur known as Pimm's. He died at his family home in East Peckham and is buried at Holy Trinity Church.

Sir Roger Twysden (1597–1672) lived at Roydon Hall, and was born in East Peckham.

Sir William Twysden, 1st Baronet (1566–1628), MP, buried in the family plot at East Peckham with a monumental inscription at St Michael's church.

== Twinning ==
East Peckham is twinned with Chéreng, Nord, France.

== See also ==
- Listed buildings in East Peckham
