= Twysden =

Twysden or Twisden is a surname, that appears mainly in Kent, England. Notable people with the surname include:

- Anne Twysden (1574–1638), English writer
- Philip Twysden (1713–1752), Anglican clergyman
- Thomas Twisden Hodges, (1809–1865) English politician
- Twysden baronets, two baronetcies created in the Baronetage of England, for members of the Twysden or Twisden family of Kent.
  - Sir William Twysden, 1st Baronet (1566–1628), MP
  - Roger Twysden (1597–1672), English historian and politician
  - Sir Thomas Twisden, 1st Baronet, (1602–1683), English lawyer, judge and politician
  - Sir William Twysden, 3rd Baronet (1635–1697), MP
  - Sir Roger Twisden, 2nd Baronet, (1640–1703), English politician
  - Sir Thomas Twisden, 3rd Baronet (1668–1728), British politician and lawyer
  - Sir Roger Twisden, 5th Baronet (1705–1772) English Tory politician
