= Roger Twysden (disambiguation) =

Roger Twysden may refer to:

- Sir Roger Twysden (1597–1672), English historian and politician
- Sir Roger Twysden, 10th Baronet (1894–1934), of the Twysden baronets
- Sir Roger Twisden, 2nd Baronet (c 1640–1703), MP for Rochester
- Sir Roger Twisden, 5th Baronet (1705–1772), MP for Kent
