= Thomas Twisden =

Thomas Twisden or Twysden may refer to:

- Sir Thomas Twisden, 1st Baronet, (1602–1683), English lawyer, judge and politician
- Sir Thomas Twisden, 3rd Baronet (1668–1728), British politician and lawyer

== See also ==
- Twysden baronets for several other Thomas Twysdens
- Thomas Twisden Hodges, MP for Rochester
