= Francis Clerke (politician, died 1691) =

English politician

Francis Clerke (c. 1665–1691) was an English politician who sat in the House of Commons from 1690 to 1691.

Clerke was the son of Sir Francis Clerke of Ulcombe and Rochester and his second wife Elizabeth Hastings, widow of John Hastings of Woodlands Dorset and daughter of John Cage of Brightwell Court Buckinghamshire. His father and grandfather were lawyers. He was educated at Magdalen College, Oxford, and entered Middle Temple in 1683. However he interrupted his studies to volunteer against the Duke of Monmouth as a cornet of horse. He was called to the bar at Middle Temple in 1688. After the death of his father in 1686 and his half brother John in 1687, he inherited Ulcome and was able to maintain the family political interest in Rochester.

Clerke was elected Member of Parliament (MP) for Rochester in 1690 until his death in 1691. Clerke lived at Ulcombe, and on his death in 1691, without issue the estate went by devise to Gilbert Clarke, second son of Gilbert Clarke of Chilcot, in Derbyshire.

Parliament of England
| Preceded by Sir John Banks; Sir Roger Twisden | Member of Parliament for Rochester; 1690–1691; With: Sir Joseph Williamson | Succeeded by Sir Joseph Williamson; Caleb Banks |
