= Powell baronets =

Set index for Powell baronets

There have been seven baronetcies created for persons with the surname Powell, five in the Baronetage of England and two in the Baronetage of the United Kingdom. As of 2026 one creation is extant.

- Powell baronets of Pengethly (1st creation, 1622)
- Powell baronets of Birkenhead (1629)
- Powell baronets of Pengethly (2nd creation, 1661): see Sir William Powell, 1st Baronet (c. 1620–1680)
- Powell baronets of Ewhurst (1661)
- Powell baronets of Broadway (1698)
- Powell baronets of Horton Old Hall (1892): see Sir Francis Sharp Powell, 1st Baronet (1827–1911)
- Powell baronets of Wimpole Street (1897)
