= Joseph Williamson (English politician) =

English civil servant, diplomat and politician (1633-1701)

The Right Honourable Sir Joseph Williamson FRS
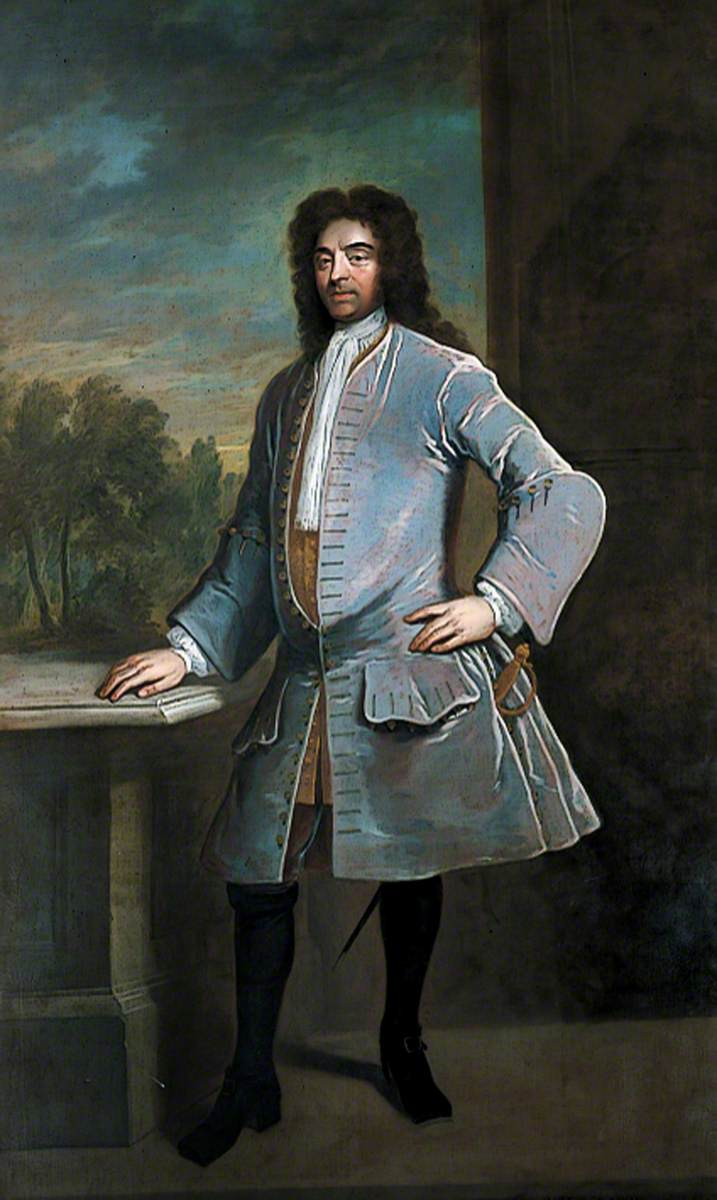
- Portrait by Godfrey Kneller

Member of the English Parliament
- 1701 1698–1699 1695–1696: Thetford
- 1690-1701: Rochester

Member of the Parliament of Ireland
- 1695–1699: Limerick City
- 1695: Portarlington
- 1692–1693: County Clare

2nd President of the Royal Society
- In office 1677–1680
- Preceded by: William Brouncker
- Succeeded by: Christopher Wren

Secretary of State for the Northern Department
- In office 1674–1679
- Preceded by: Henry Coventry
- Succeeded by: Robert Spencer

Personal details
- Born: 25 July 1633 Bridekirk, England
- Died: 3 October 1701 (aged 68) Cobham, Kent, England
- Resting place: Westminster Abbey
- Spouse(s): Katherine Stewart, Baroness Clifton

Sir Joseph Williamson, FRS (25 July 1633 – 3 October 1701) was an English civil servant, diplomat and politician who sat in the House of Commons of England variously between 1665 and 1701 and in the Irish House of Commons between 1692 and 1699. He was Secretary of State for the Northern Department from 1674 to 1679.

== Early life ==
Williamson was born at Bridekirk, near Cockermouth in Cumberland, where his father, also called Joseph, was vicar. His father died when he was very young, and his mother remarried the Reverend John Ardery. His relatively humble origins were often referred to unkindly in later life by his enemies, especially after he married into the aristocracy. He was educated at St. Bees School, Westminster School and Queen's College, Oxford, of which he became a fellow.

== Early career ==
In 1660 he entered the service of the Secretary of State for the Southern Department, Sir Edward Nicholas, retaining his position under the succeeding secretary, Sir Henry Bennet, afterwards Earl of Arlington. He made himself indispensable to Arlington, due to his enormous capacity for hard work, which resulted in his employer delegating most of the routine work of the department to him. He was involved with the foundation of the London Gazette in 1665.

Williamson was elected Member of Parliament for Thetford in 1669 and held the seat until 1685. No less than three previous attempts to enter Parliament had been unsuccessful, due to an increasing "backlash" against Government candidates. Samuel Pepys in his celebrated Diary records that when Williamson appeared at the hustings in 1666, he was shouted down by cries of "No courtiers!" In 1672 he was made one of the clerks of the council and was knighted.

During the Third Anglo-Dutch War, he drew up plans for the Zealand Expedition which was intended to land a newly formed English Army in the Netherlands. The strategy was abandoned after the naval defeat at the Battle of Texel and the Treaty of Westminster which ended the war.

In 1673 and 1674 he represented his country at the Congress of Cologne, and in the latter year he became Secretary of State for the Northern Department, having practically purchased this position from Arlington for £6,000, a sum that he required from his successor when he left office in 1679. He served as Master of The Clothworkers' Company from 1676 to 1677. In 1677, he became the second President of the Royal Society, but his main interests, after politics, were in antiquarian rather than in scientific matters.

As Secretary of State, he largely continued Arlington's policy of friendship towards France, and hostility towards the Netherlands. Sir Joseph represented England at the Congress of Nijmegen (1678–79). William III of Orange developed a deep aversion to Williamson: quite apart from their opposing policies, he is said to have found the tone of Williamson's dispatches unbearably patronising ("as though I was a child to be fed on whipped cream" William grumbled).

== Popish Plot ==
Just before his removal from the post of Secretary of State, he was arrested on a charge of being implicated in the Popish Plot, but he was at once released by order of Charles II. Williamson was a particular target of the informers because he was one of the few Ministers who openly disbelieved in the Plot: when Israel Tonge first approached him with "information", Williamson, who believed, with some reason, that Tonge was insane, gave him a "rude repulse". As for the other informers, several of whom were members of London's criminal underworld, his efficient intelligence service no doubt told him everything necessary about their characters. For this reason, the King, who was equally sceptical about the Plot's reality, wished to retain his services, at least in the short term. The actual charge made against Williamson, of commissioning Roman Catholic army officers, was entirely spurious since these officers were intended for foreign service.

Williamson's nerve began to give way under the strain of the Plot, and he became a political liability. Charles finally dismissed him after he gave orders to search Somerset House, the Queen's official residence, without the King's permission; the King, "in great anger" told him that "I marvel at your effrontery in searching my house... your head is turning.....I do not wish to be served by a man who fears anyone more than me". Danby was suspected by many of having a part in Williamson's downfall, as he was said to have taken offence at Williamson's recent marriage to Lady Clifton, a wealthy widow and cousin of the King.

== Marriage ==
His marriage, at the beginning of the Popish Plot, should on the face of it have strengthened him politically: his wife was Katherine Stewart, Baroness Clifton, daughter of George Stewart, 9th Seigneur d'Aubigny, and sister of Charles Stewart, 3rd Duke of Richmond, and thus a member of a junior branch of the Stuart dynasty. Her first husband, by whom she had several children, was Henry O'Brien, Lord Ibrackan (c. 1642 – 1 September 1678), an old friend of Williamson; she and Williamson had no children.

Despite the obvious advantages of the match to Williamson himself, John Evelyn reported that it was very unpopular, and it probably weakened Williamson politically. Since Katherine as well as her first husband was an old friend of Williamson she was not a surprising choice as a bride; but the fact that O'Brien had been dead for only three months when she remarried gave rise to ill-natured gossip that Williamson and Katherine had been lovers during her first marriage: "'Tis said they live together less happily than before they married" ran one gibe. More seriously in an age of marked class distinctions, it was considered improper that the sister of a Royal Duke should marry a country clergyman's son, and even her children are said to have objected to the marriage. Danby, who reportedly thought that Katherine would be a good match for his own son, was suspected of having had a hand in Williamson's downfall.

== Later career ==
After a period of comparative inactivity, in 1698 he signed the Treaty of The Hague (1698), the first treaty for the partition of the Spanish Monarchy. It was characteristic of William III that despite his personal dislike of Williamson, so evident in the 1670s, he did not hesitate to make use of his diplomatic skills. The negotiations had been kept a strict secret, and news of the Treaty caused uproar in England, but Williamson himself escaped any serious censure.

In 1690, Williamson was elected Member of Parliament for Rochester and held the seat until 1701. He was also elected MP for Thetford in three separate elections, but each time chose to sit for Rochester instead.

Between 1692 and 1695, Williamson was also MP in the Irish House of Commons for County Clare. In 1695 he represented Portarlington for a few months and subsequently Limerick City until 1699. He was awarded the Freedom of the City of Dublin in 1696, as a tribute to his interest in civic improvements in Dublin. In return, he presented the city fathers with a silver cup.

== Death and reputation ==
Williamson died at Cobham, Kent, on 3 October 1701, and was buried in Westminster Abbey, where his widow joined him a year later. He had become very rich by taking advantage of the many opportunities of making money which his official position gave him; and despite the heavy debts left by her brother, his wife is also said to have brought him a fortune. He left £6,000 and his library to Queen's College, Oxford; £5,000 to found a school at Rochester, Sir Joseph Williamson's Mathematical School; and £2,000 to Thetford. A great number of Williamson's letters, dispatches, memoranda, etc., are among the English state papers.

He has been described as one of the greatest English civil servants of his time, and is credited with building up an intelligence service as efficient as that which John Thurloe had operated under Oliver Cromwell. His detailed notes of Privy Council meetings are an invaluable source of information about its operation, especially in the political crisis of 1678–79. On the other hand, he was a poor public speaker: even Charles II, himself a very hesitant speaker, complained of his "droning".

Despite his gifts, he was not popular, being described as dry, formal and arrogant, an uncertain friend and a harsh employer. Many of his colleagues, like Sir Leoline Jenkins, felt the lash of his sharp tongue. On the other hand, his will, in which he remembered all those who had a claim on him, suggests that he did not lack a certain generosity of character; and he was capable of forming lifelong friendships, notably with Samuel Pepys.

== In fiction ==
He is a recurring character in the Thomas Chaloner series of mystery novels by Susanna Gregory, in which he plays a somewhat villainous role: his wife and her first husband appear in the seventh book in the series, The Piccadilly Plot. Williamson also appears regularly in Andrew Taylor's series of novels about the adventures of Whitehall clerk James Marwood and architect Cat Lovett.

== See also ==
- Popish Plot
- List of presidents of the Royal Society

== Sources ==
- Kenyon J.P. The Popish Plot William Heinemann, 1972; Phoenix Press Reissue 2000, pp. 117–18
- Seccombe, Thomas (1900). "Williamson, Joseph" . In Lee, Sidney (ed.). Dictionary of National Biography. Vol. 62. London: Smith, Elder & Co.

Political offices
Preceded by Henry Coventry	Secretary of State for the Northern Department; 1674–1679	Succeeded by The Earl of Sunderland
Parliament of England
Preceded by Sir John Banks, Bt; Sir Roger Twisden, Bt	Member of Parliament for Rochester; 1690–1701; With: Francis Clerke 1690–1691; Caleb Banks 1691–1695; Sir Cloudesley Shovell 1695–1701	Succeeded by Francis Barrell; William Bokenham
Preceded by Sir Francis Guybon; Baptist May	Member of Parliament for Thetford; 1695–1696; With: Sir John Wodehouse, Bt	Succeeded by Sir John Wodehouse, Bt
Preceded by Sir John Wodehouse, Bt; James Sloane	Member of Parliament for Thetford; 1698–1699; With: James Sloane	Succeeded by James Sloane; Lord Paston
Preceded by James Sloane; Lord Paston	Member of Parliament for Thetford; 1701; With: Edmund Soame	Succeeded by Edmund Soame; Sir Thomas Hanmer
Parliament of Ireland
Unknown	Member of Parliament for County Clare; 1692–1693; With: Sir Donough O'Brien, 1st Bt	Succeeded by Sir Donough O'Brien, 1st Bt; Sir Henry Ingoldsby, 1st Bt
Preceded by Daniel Gahan; Richard Warburton	Member of Parliament for Portarlington; 1695; With: Richard Warburton	Succeeded by George Warburton; Richard Warburton
Preceded by Joseph Coghlan; Sir Charles Feilding	Member of Parliament for Limerick City; 1695–1699; With: Joseph Coghlan	Succeeded by Robert Blennerhassett; Richard Ingoldsby
Professional and academic associations
Preceded by William Brouncker	2nd President of the Royal Society; 1677–1680	Succeeded by Christopher Wren
