= Sir John Banks, 1st Baronet =

English merchant and MP

Sir John Banks FRS

Member of Parliament
- In office 1679–1698
- Preceded by: Francis Clarke; Richard Head
- Succeeded by: Robert Marsham; Thomas Bliss
- Constituency: Rochester (1679–1690); Queenborough (1690–1695); Maidstone (1695–1698)
- In office February 1678 – March 1678
- Preceded by: Robert Austen; Francis Finch
- Succeeded by: Robert Austen; Cresheld Draper
- Constituency: Winchelsea
- In office 1654–1660
- Preceded by: Vacant
- Succeeded by: Thomas Twisden; Robert Barnham
- Constituency: Maidstone

Personal details
- Born: 1627
- Died: 18 October 1699 (aged 71–72)
- Spouse: Elizabeth Dethick (m. 1657)
- Children: 3, including Caleb
- Education: Emmanuel College, Cambridge

Sir John Banks, 1st Baronet FRS (1627 – 18 October 1699) was an English merchant and MP, who rose from relatively humble beginnings to be one of the wealthiest merchants in London and owner of several properties.

== Life ==
Banks was the son of Caleb Bankes (died 1669) of Maidstone, Kent, gent, and Martha Dann. He was educated at Emmanuel College, Cambridge.

About 1657, Banks married Elizabeth Dethick, daughter of Sir John Dethick. They had several children. His son Caleb was MP for various constituencies, but predeceased him without issue in 1696.

Banks was created a baronet by King Charles II in 1661. He was elected a Fellow of the Royal Society in 1668.

Escutcheon of the Banks baronets of London

He invested in the overseas trade with the East and with Africa and in 1677 was financially involved in an expedition to search for a North-east trade route. He was Governor of the East India Company in 1673–74.

Banks was Member of Parliament (MP) several times; for Maidstone 1654–1659, for Winchelsea 1678, for Rochester 1679–1690, for Queenborough 1690–1695 and again for Maidstone 1695–1698.

In 1672, he advocated for the rights of non-conformist congregations to be allowed to meet.

On Banks death in 1699 the baronetcy became extinct. He was survived by two married daughters (Mary, who had married John Savile and Elizabeth, who had married Heneage Finch) who were co-heiresses to his estate.

== Notes ==
Parliament of England
Vacant unrepresented in the Barebones Parliament Title last held by Thomas Twisden	Member of Parliament for Maidstone; 1654–1660; With: Andrew Broughton 1659	Succeeded by Thomas Twisden; Robert Barnham
Preceded by Robert Austen; Francis Finch	Member of Parliament for Winchelsea; February 1678 – March 1678; With: Robert Austen	Succeeded by Robert Austen; Cresheld Draper
Preceded by Francis Clerke; Sir Richard Head, Bt	Member of Parliament for Rochester; 1679–1690; With: Sir Richard Head, Bt (1679); Francis Barrell (1679); Francis Clerke (1681–89); Sir Roger Twisden, Bt (1689–90)	Succeeded by Joseph Williamson; Francis Clerke
Preceded by James Herbert; Robert Crawford	Member of Parliament for Queenborough; 1690–1695; With: Robert Crawford	Succeeded by Caleb Banks; Robert Crawford
Preceded by Thomas Rider; Sir Thomas Taylor, Bt	Member of Parliament for Maidstone; 1695–1698; With: Sir Thomas Taylor, Bt to 1696; Thomas Rider 1696–98	Succeeded by Sir Robert Marsham, Bt; Thomas Bliss
Baronetage of England
New creation	Baronet (of London); 1661–1699	Extinct
