= Francis Barrell =

Francis Barrell may refer to:

- Francis Barrell (died 1679) (c. 1627–1679), English politician, MP for Rochester
- Francis Barrell (1662–1724), English politician, MP for Rochester
