= HMS Egmont (1768) =

Ship of the line of the Royal Navy

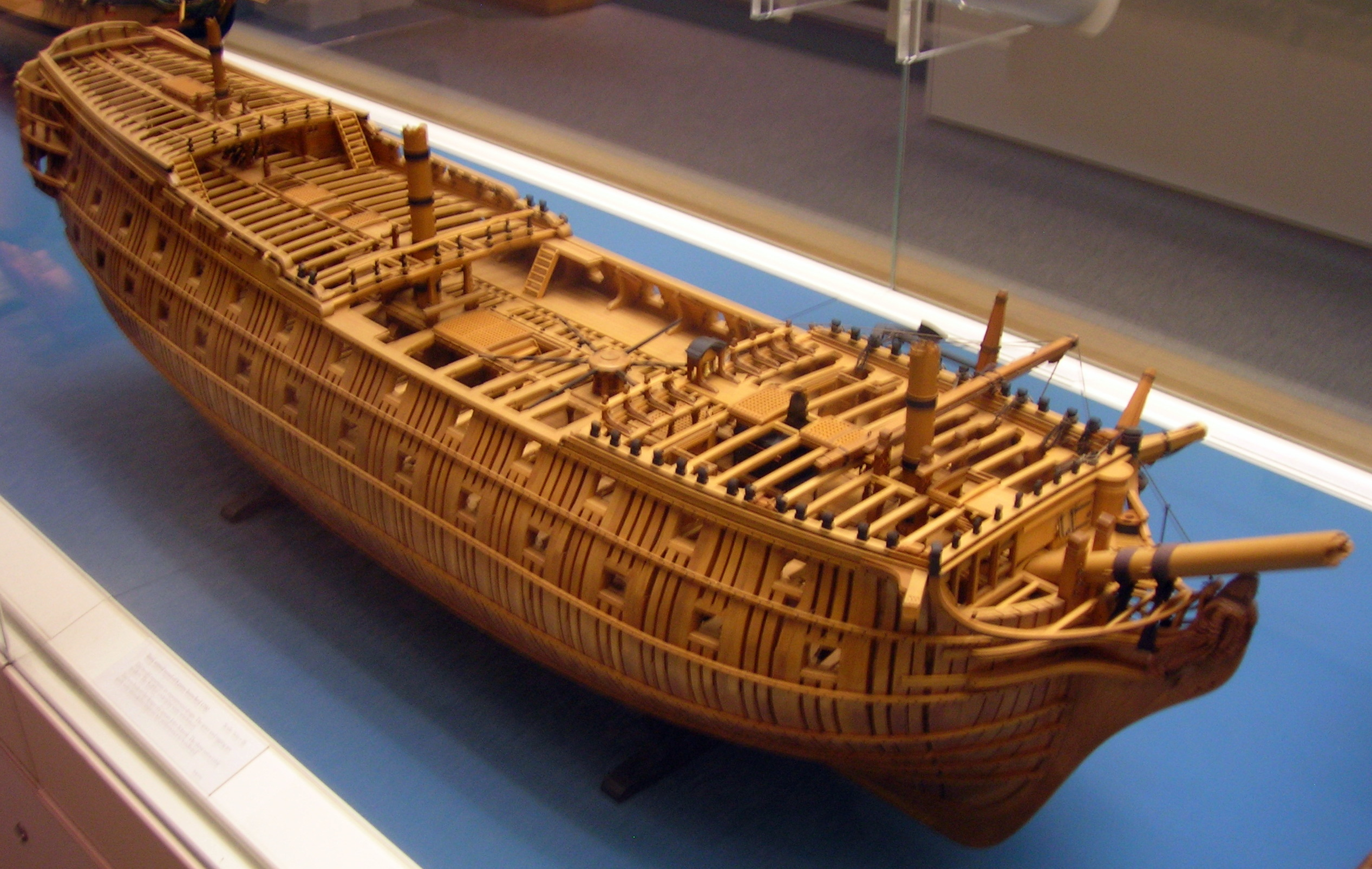
- A model of Egmont, held in the National Maritime Museum.

History

Great Britain
- Name: HMS Egmont
- Ordered: 6 June 1765
- Builder: Deptford Dockyard
- Laid down: October 1766
- Launched: 29 August 1768
- Fate: Broken up, Chatham, Kent, 1799
- Notes: Participated In: Battle of Cape St Vincent (1797)

General characteristics
- Class & type: 74-gun third rate ship of the line
- Tons burthen: 164276/94 (bm)
- Length: 168 ft 6 in (51.36 m) (gundeck)
- Beam: 46 ft 11 1/2 in (14.3 m)
- Depth of hold: 19 ft 9 in (6.02 m)
- Propulsion: Sails
- Sail plan: Full-rigged ship
- Armament: 74 guns: Gundeck: 28 × 32 pdrs; Upper gundeck: 28 × 18 pdrs; Quarterdeck: 14 × 9 pdrs; Forecastle: 4 × 9 pdrs

HMS Egmont was a 74-gun third rate ship of the line of the Royal Navy, launched on 29 August 1768 at Deptford. She was designed by Sir Thomas Slade, and was the only ship built to her draught.

Egmont was part of the squadron commanded by Admiral John Gell on 14 April 1793 which escorted a Spanish ship, the St. Jago, they had captured from the French back to Portsmouth. The ownership of the Spanish ship was a matter of some debate and was not settled until 4 February 1795 when the value of the cargo was put at £935,000. At this time all the crew, captains, officers and admirals could expect a share of the prize money—Admiral Hood's share was £50,000. Besides Egmont, the ships that escorted her into Portsmouth were HMS St George, HMS Edgar, HMS Ganges and HMS Phaeton.

Egmont suffered heavy damage in the Battle of Ushant in 1778. Her captain reported to Admiralty that the vessel received eleven cannonballs to the starboard side and two more through the mainmast. The mizzen mast had been shot through and fallen overboard and the foremast had shattered in its centre section.

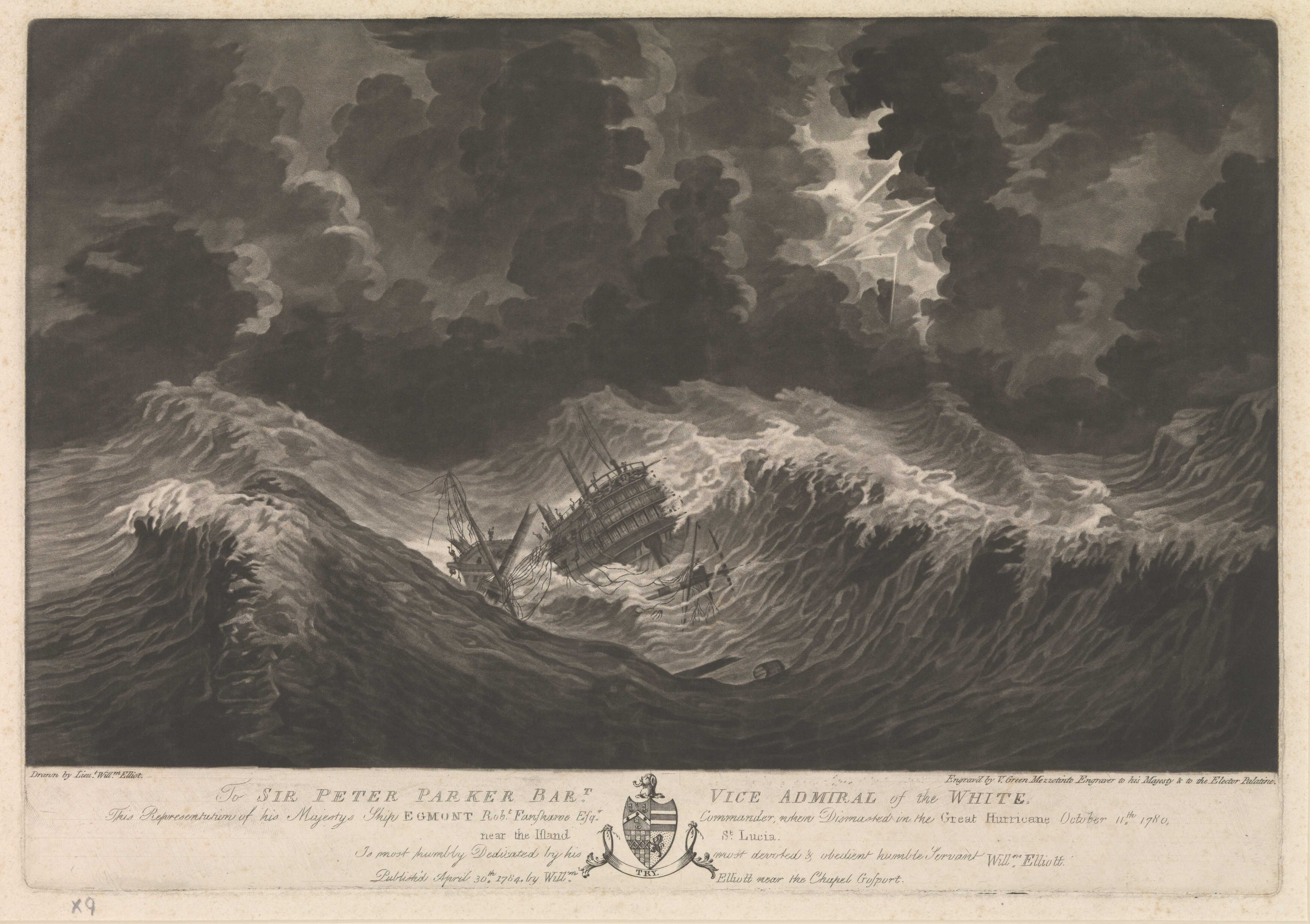
Egmont, when dismasted in the Great Hurricane of 1780 on 11 October near the Island of St Lucia

Egmont was part of the fleet under Lord Hood that occupied Toulon in August 1793. With HMS Courageux, Meleager, Tartar and Robust, she covered the landing, on 27 August, of 1500 troops sent to remove the republicans occupying the forts guarding the port. Once the forts were secure, the remainder of Hood's fleet, accompanied by 17 Spanish ships-of-the-line which had just arrived, sailed into the harbour.

Egmont participated in the Battle of Cape St Vincent (1797) under the command of Captain John Sutton. She was broken up in 1799.
