= Beaumont Hotham, 2nd Baron Hotham =

English judge and politician

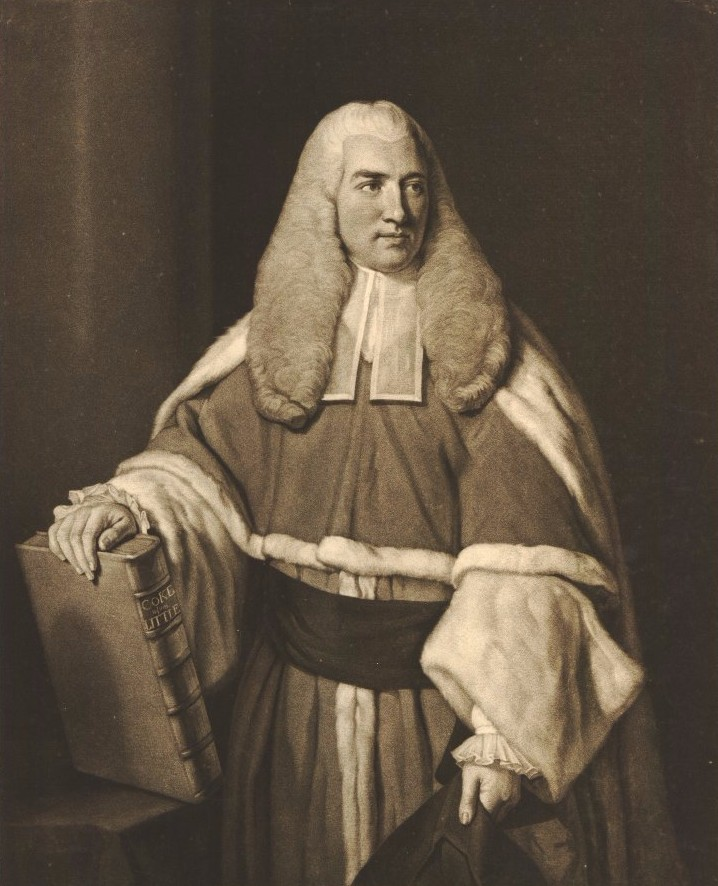
Beaumont Hotham, 2nd Baron Hotham

Beaumont Hotham, 2nd Baron Hotham (5 August 1737 – 3 March 1814) was an English judge and politician who sat in the House of Commons from 1768 to 1774.

== Life ==
He was the fourth son of Sir Beaumont Hotham, 7th Baronet and his wife Frances Thompson of Welton, Yorkshire; Sir Charles Hotham-Thompson, 8th Baronet was the eldest son.

He was educated at Westminster School and Trinity Hall, Cambridge. He was admitted to the Middle Temple in 1753, and called to the bar in 1758.

He was an MP for Wigan from 1768 to 1774, and helped prepare the Madhouses Act 1774. He resigned for his appointment as Baron of the Exchequer; he was then succeeded in Parliament in the by-election of 1775 by John Morton.

He became a Lord Commissioner of the Great Seal in 1783 and a Baron of the Exchequer for thirty years, from 1784 until February 1805. He became 2nd Baron Hotham in May 1813 upon the death of his elder brother, William Hotham, 1st Baron Hotham. He was succeeded as 3rd baron by his grandson, Beaumont Hotham, 3rd Baron Hotham (1794–1870).

== Family ==
Hotham married in 1767 Susanna Hankey, daughter of Sir Thomas Hankey, as her second husband. They had threes sons and three daughters. Of the children:

- Beaumont (1768–1799) married Philadelphia Dyke (died 1808), daughter of Sir John Dixon Dyke, 3rd Baronet, and was the father of Beaumont Hotham, 3rd Baron Hotham
- Henry (1777–1833), Royal Navy officer
- Frederick (died 1854), a cleric.
- Frances, married in 1797 John Sutton.
- Amelia, married in 1798 John Woodcock.
- Louisa, married firstly Sir Charles Edmonstone, 2nd Baronet, and secondly Charles Woodcock.

Parliament of Great Britain
Preceded by Fletcher Norton; Simon Luttrell	Member of Parliament for Wigan; 1768–1774; With: George Byng	Succeeded by George Byng; John Morton
Peerage of Ireland
Preceded by William Hotham	Baron Hotham; 1813–1814	Succeeded by Beaumont Hotham
