= Isabella Twysden =

English diarist

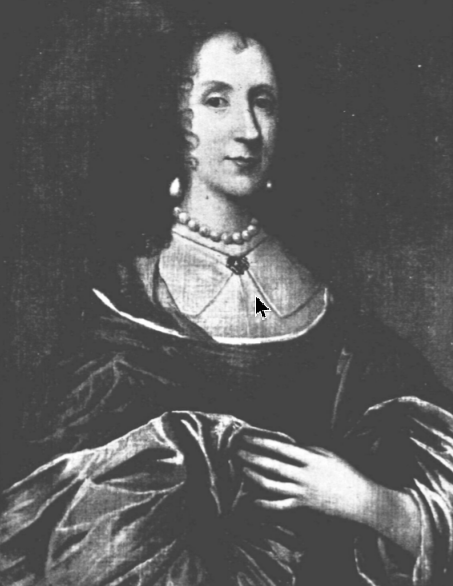
- Painting owned by Thomas Edward Twisden
- Born: Isabella Saunders; 1605
- Died: 1657 (aged 51–52)
- Occupation: Lady in Waiting
- Employer: Anne Twysden
- Known for: diarist
- Spouse: Sir Roger Twysden

Isabella Twysden (née Saunders; 1605–1657) was an English diarist. She lived at Royden Hall in East Peckham.

== Life ==
She was born in 1605 and her mother was Elizabeth Blount. Her father was Sir Nicholas Saunders of Nonsuch who had been knighted in 1603. She was the youngest of his three daughters. They lived at Ewell in Surrey. Her father had been imprisoned as a Catholic but he had converted to the Church of England and became a member of parliament. Her mother remained and was known to be still a Catholic. After the Gunpowder Plot was discovered in 1605, Nicholas Saunders sat on a committee to advise on ways of stopping further Catholic plots.

In 1633 she took a job as a Lady in Waiting to Anne Twysden who is known as a writer. She had houses in East Peckham and in London. Her son was Sir Roger Twysden. In 1635, Isabella married Sir Roger Twysden who was about seven years older than her.

Her husband was to be punished for his outspoken opinions. He was imprisoned and his estates were sequestered and allegedly mismanaged. His cousin was Heneage Finch, the Solicitor General, but he still spent a long time away despite Isabella's efforts.

She began her extant diary in January 1645.

== Death and legacy ==
She died in 1657 at their small house in Westminster, but her body was transported back to East Peckham for burial. She and her husband had three sons and three daughters. A memorial erected by her son in 1689 was placed in St Michael's Church in East Peckham to her and her husband.

Twysden is noted in history for her diary which was offered for sale by Sotheby's in 1892. It was purchased by the British Museum where it still resides. It was published in 1939. The diary gives a short account of the family occasions in her life and the news of recent executions.
