= Amos Meredith =

British peer

Sir Amos Meredith
- Baronet of Marston
- Tenure: 1639–1669
- Predecessor: New creation
- Successor: Sir William Meredith, 2nd Baronet
- Died: 5 December 1669
- Spouse: Elizabeth Courtenay (before 1669)
- Issue: Sir William Meredith, 2nd Baronet
- Father: Edward Meredith

Sir Amos Meredith, 1st Baronet (died 5 December 1669) was an English baronet. He also held several government positions having served as governor of Exmouth and gentleman of the Privy Chamber, among others.

== Biography ==
He was the son and heir of Edward Ameredeth (or Meredith) of Marston, Tamerton Foliot; the family was distantly related to Bishop Richard Meredith whose descendants were baronets in Ireland. He was created a Baronet of Nova Scotia on 2 June 1639 but never appears to have had seisin of any land in Nova Scotia. During the Civil War he was colonel of a troop of Horse and governor of Exmouth in the Royalist cause. An account show that he raised this troop at his own expense and served as lieutenant-colonel of a regiment until the end of the war. On the Restoration he was made a Gentleman of the Privy Chamber to King Charles II. He was Member of Parliament for Ballynakill from 1661 to 1666 and a commissioner of Customs and Excise in Ireland.

The baronet was married to Elizabeth, whose first husband was Francis Courtenay. He died on 5 December 1669 and was succeeded by his son William, who was a member of the British parliament representing Wigan (1754-1761) and Liverpool (1761-1780).

Baronetage of Nova Scotia
New creation	Baronet (of Marston); 1639–1669	Succeeded by William Meredith
