= John Morton (MP, died 1780) =

English Tory politician (c.1716–1780)

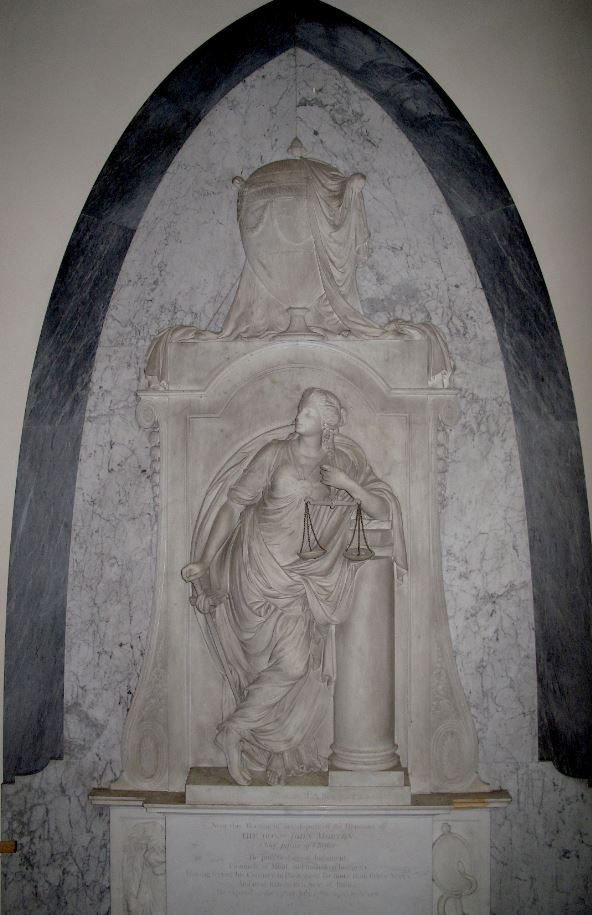
- Memorial for John Morton in St Nicholas Church, Tackley
- Born: c. 1716; Oxfordshire
- Died: 1780

John Morton (c. 1716 – 25 July 1780) was an English lawyer and Tory politician who sat in the House of Commons between 1747 and 1780.

== Early life ==
He was the son of John Morton of Tackley, Oxfordshire and was educated at John Roysse's Free School in Abingdon (now Abingdon School) and Trinity College, Oxford.

== Personal life ==
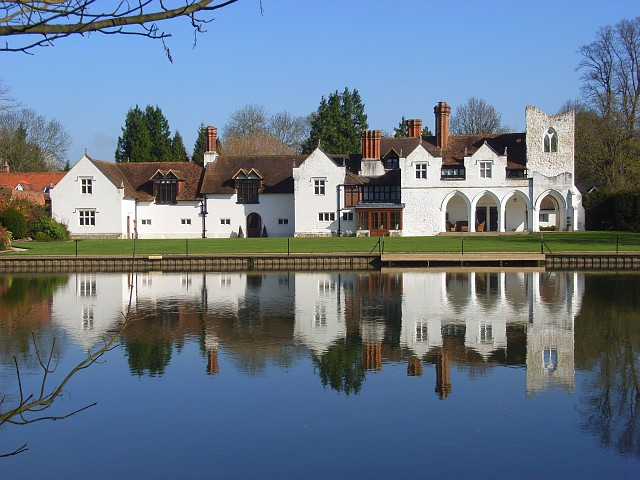
Medmenham Abbey today

Morton bought the ruins of Medmenham Abbey in 1778. He married Elizabeth, the daughter of Paul Jodrell of Duffield, Derbyshire. He was a Steward of the OA Club in 1749.

== Career ==
He entered the Inner Temple in 1732, was called to the bar in 1740 and made a bencher in 1758. He was appointed Recorder of Woodstock in 1743, made King's Counsel in 1758, Chief Justice of Chester from 1762 to his death and deputy high steward of Oxford University from 1770 to his death.

Morton was returned as Member of Parliament for Abingdon at the 1747 general election and one of the main pillars of support was the headmaster of his alma mater. As a Tory he attracted opposition, and there was a concerted but unsuccessful Whig attempt to unseat him in 1754. In 1765, a Bill of Regency came before Parliament, to make provisions should George III die unexpectedly. The terms of the Bill and the choice of regents rapidly became the subject of debate between Whigs and Tories, particularly the question of whether the King's mother, the Dowager Princess of Wales, should be capable to serve as Regent. (Her connection with Lord Bute had made her the target of Whig attacks.) George Grenville, who opposed her appointment, represented to the King that a Regency Bill inclusive of her could not pass the House of Commons. The King reluctantly consented, not wishing to re-open the accusations against his mother, and the Bill passed the House of Lords excluding the Princess. However, the Chancellor, Lord Northington, discovering the circumstances, he gave Morton secret instructions. Morton, in what Lord Temple called "a dull speech", proposed to amend the Bill and add the Princess to it; he was seconded by Edward Kynaston and thirded by Samuel Martin, the Princess' treasurer, and the amendment unexpectedly passed. The Whigs were largely unwilling to divide and go on the record opposing the amendment, and the amended bill passed both Commons and Lords, notwithstanding Grenville's prediction. The King was outraged, and dismissed Grenville soon after.

Morton was re-elected for Abingdon in 1768, defeating Nathaniel Bayly by the narrow margin of two votes. However, the election was overturned on petition and Bayly declared the victor in 1770. Morton was able to obtain a seat from Sir Edward Dering, 6th Baronet, at New Romney, which he represented until the close of that Parliament in 1774. In the election of 1775, he was elected MP for Wigan, replacing Sir Beaumont Hotham, who had been appointed a Baron of the Exchequer.

Parliament of Great Britain
Preceded by John Wright	Member of Parliament for Abingdon; 1747–1770	Succeeded by Nathaniel Bayly
Preceded by Sir Edward Dering, Bt; Richard Jackson	Member of Parliament for New Romney; 1770–1774; With: Richard Jackson	Succeeded by Richard Jackson; Sir Edward Dering, Bt
Preceded by George Byng; Sir Beaumont Hotham	Member of Parliament for Wigan; 1775–1780; With: George Byng	Succeeded by George Byng; Henry Simpson Bridgeman
Legal offices
Preceded by William Noel	Chief Justice of Chester; 1762–1780	Succeeded by Lloyd Kenyon

== See also ==
- List of Old Abingdonians
