= Sir Roger Meredith, 5th Baronet =

English politician

- Born: 1677
- Died: 31 December 1738 (aged 61)
- Occupation: politician
- Spouse: Maria Gott
- Parents: Sir Richard Meredith, 2nd Baronet (father); Susanna Skippon (mother)

Sir Roger Meredith, 5th Baronet (c. 1677 – 31 December 1738) was an English politician who sat in the House of Commons from 1727 to 1734.

Meredith was the son of Sir Richard Meredith, 2nd Baronet and his wife Susanna Skippon, daughter of Philip Skippon of Foulsham Norfolk. He succeeded to the baronetcy on the death of his brother Sir Richard Meredith in 1723.

In 1727, Meredith was elected Member of Parliament (MP) for Kent and held the seat to 1734.

Meredith lived at Leeds Abbey in Kent. He died in December 1738 and was buried at Leeds church, Kent in January 1739 having a monument erected to his memory.

Meredith married Maria Gott, widow of Samuel Gott and daughter of Francis Tyssen of Shacklewell. They had no children and on his death, the baronetcy became extinct. He devised his estates to his niece Susanna Meredith, daughter of his brother colonel Henry Meredith.

Parliament of Great Britain
Preceded by Sir Edward Knatchbull, Bt; Sir Thomas Twisden, Bt	Member of Parliament for Kent; 1727–1734; With: Sir Robert Furnese, Bt 1727–1733; Sir Edward Dering, Bt 1733–1734	Succeeded by The Viscount Vane; Sir Edward Dering, Bt
Baronetage of England
Preceded by Richard Meredith	Baronet (of Stainsley); 1723–1739	Extinct
