= Clarke baronets of Snailwell (1698) =

Baronetcy in the County of Cambridge, England

Escutcheon of the Clarke Baronets of Snailwell

The Clarke Baronetcy, of Snailwell in the County of Cambridge, was created in the Baronetage of England on 25 July 1698 for Samuel Clarke. The second Baronet sat as Member of Parliament for Cambridgeshire. The third Baronet was Sheriff of Huntingdonshire and Cambridgeshire between 1753 and 1754. The title became extinct on the death of the sixth Baronet in 1806.

== Clarke baronets, of Snailwell (1698) ==
- Sir Samuel Clarke, 1st Baronet (died 1719)
- Sir Robert Clarke, 2nd Baronet (1683–1746)
- Sir Samuel Clarke, 3rd Baronet (1712–1758)
- Sir Robert Clarke, 4th Baronet (1714–1770)
- Sir John Clarke, 5th Baronet (c. 1763–1782)
- Sir Arthur Clarke, 6th Baronet (1715–1806)

== Notes ==
Baronetage of England
Preceded by Powell baronets	Clarke baronets 25 July 1698	Succeeded by Firebrace baronets
