= Sir Christopher Powell, 4th Baronet =

British Member of Parliament (c. 1690–1742)

Sir Christopher Powell, 4th Baronet (c. 1690–1742), of Wierton House, in Boughton Monchelsea, Kent, was a British Whig politician who sat in the House of Commons from 1735 to 1741.

== Biography ==
Powell was the second son of Barnham Powell and his wife Elizabeth Clitherow, daughter of James Clitherow of Boston, Middlesex and grandson of Sir Nathaniel Powell, 2nd Baronet of Wierton. He succeeded his brother to the baronetcy in 1708. He matriculated at Queen's, Oxford on 15 July 1709, aged 19. In. 1728, he married Frances Newington.

Powell was returned unopposed as a Whig Member of Parliament for Kent on 19 February 1735 in succession to Lord Vane. He voted with the Opposition. He did not stand in 1741 British general election.

Powell died without issue on 5 July 1742. His tomb, sculpted by Peter Scheemakers lies in Boughton Monchelsea.

Parliament of Great Britain
| Preceded by The Viscount Vane; Sir Edward Dering, Bt | Member of Parliament for Kent; 1735–1741; With: Sir Edward Dering, Bt | Succeeded by Sir Roger Twisden, Bt; Sir Edward Dering, Bt |
Baronetage of England
| Preceded by Nathaniel Powell | Baronet (of Ewhurst); 1708-1742 | Extinct |
