= Sir Edward Dering, 6th Baronet =

British politician

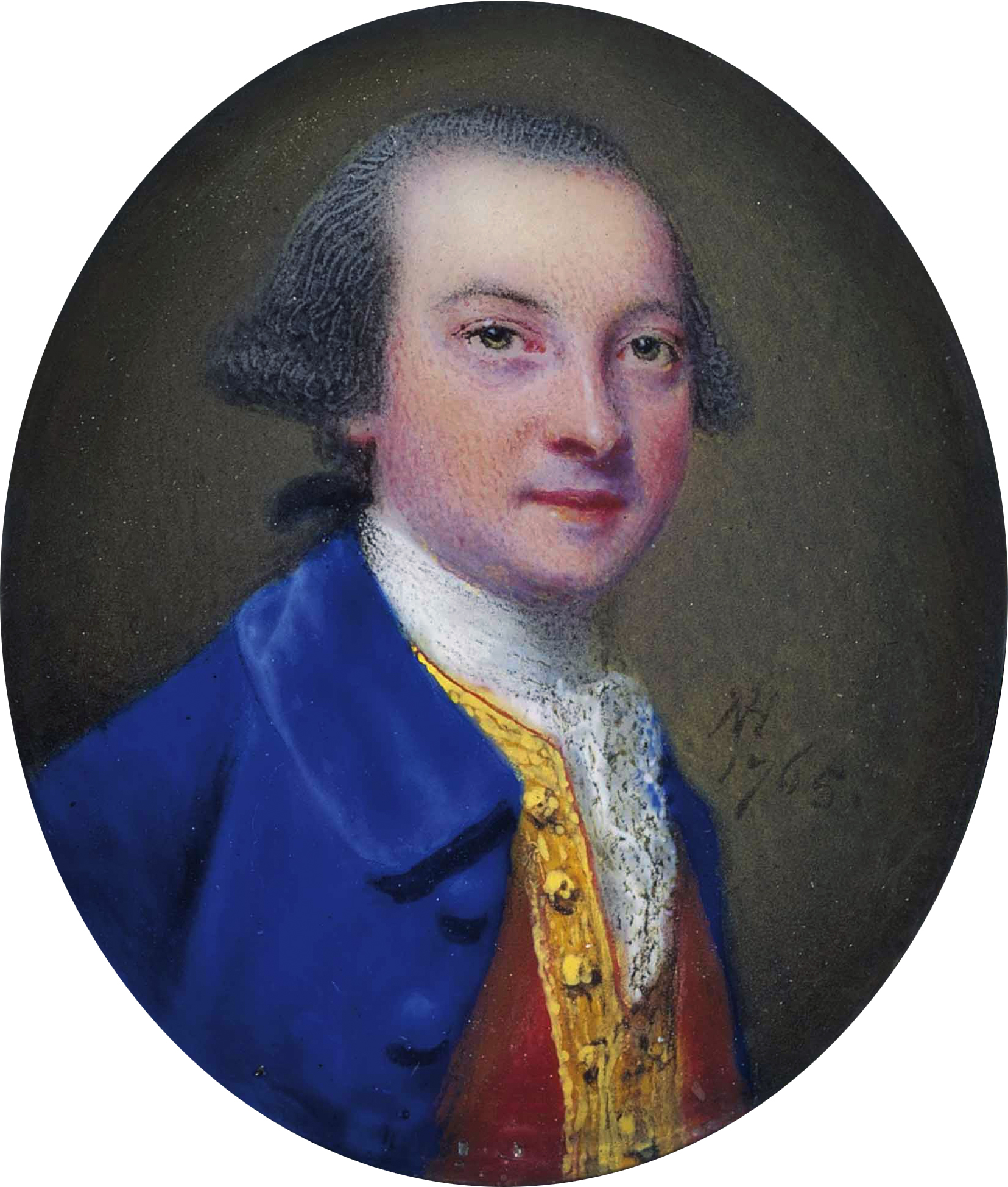
Edward Dering, 6th Bt (1732–1798) (Nathaniel Hone, 1765)

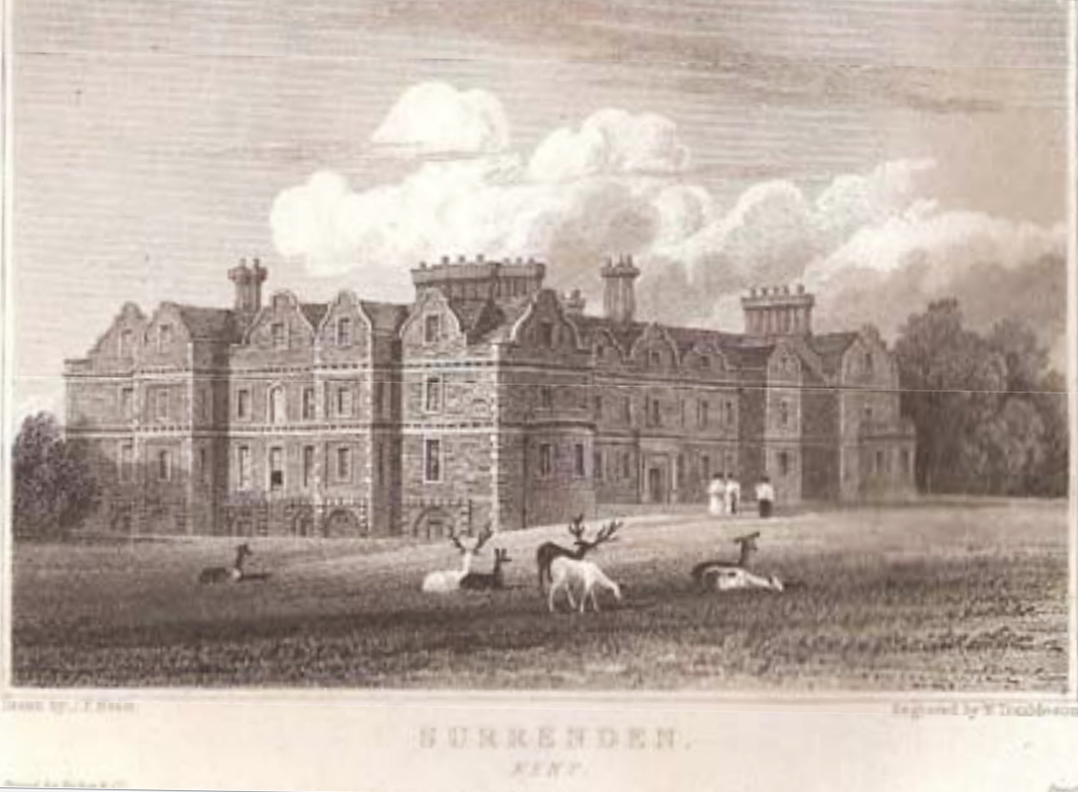
Surrenden House, Kent in 1826

Sir Edward Dering, 6th Baronet (28 September 1732 – 8 December 1798) was a British politician who sat in the House of Commons between 1761 and 1787.

He was the eldest son of Sir Edward Dering, 5th Baronet and Elizabeth Henshaw and was educated at the King's School, Canterbury, Westminster School and St John's College, Cambridge. He succeeded his father as 6th baronet in 1762, inheriting Surrenden House in Pluckley, Kent.

He was installed as the Member of Parliament for New Romney in 1761 but left Parliament in 1770 by accepting the Stewardship of the Chiltern Hundreds in order to supply a seat for John Morton, defeated at Abingdon. He returned to the seat in 1774 but in 1787 again left Parliament by accepting the Stewardship of the Manor of East Hendred, this time due to ill health, and did not stand for election again.

He died in 1798.

== Family ==
He had married twice; firstly Selina, the daughter of Sir Robert Furnese, 2nd Baronet, M.P., of Waldershare, Kent, with whom he had a son and a daughter and secondly Deborah, the daughter of John Winchester, surgeon, with whom he had a further 3 sons and 2 daughters:

- Colonel Cholmeley Dering (died 1836) MP.
- Selina (c. 1756-19 Apr 1836); married Dr. Skinner Robert Baylis Dealtry. They had at least one son, George.
- Sir Edward (16 Feb 1757 – 30 June 1811); married Anne Hale, granddaughter of Sir Bernard Hale and Sir Charles Farnaby, 1st Baronet. They had three sons.

Parliament of Great Britain
Preceded by Sir Francis Dashwood; Rose Fuller	Member of Parliament for New Romney; 1761–1770; With: Thomas Knight 1761–1768; Richard Jackson 1768–1770	Succeeded by Richard Jackson; John Morton
Preceded by Richard Jackson; John Morton	Member of Parliament for New Romney; 1774–1787; With: Richard Jackson 1774–1784; John Smith 1784; Richard Atkinson 1784–1785; John Henniker 1785–1787	Succeeded by John Henniker; Richard Joseph Sullivan
Baronetage of England
Preceded by Edward Dering	Baronet (of Surrenden Dering); 1762–1798	Succeeded by Edward Dering
