= Sir Edward Dering, 5th Baronet =

English politician

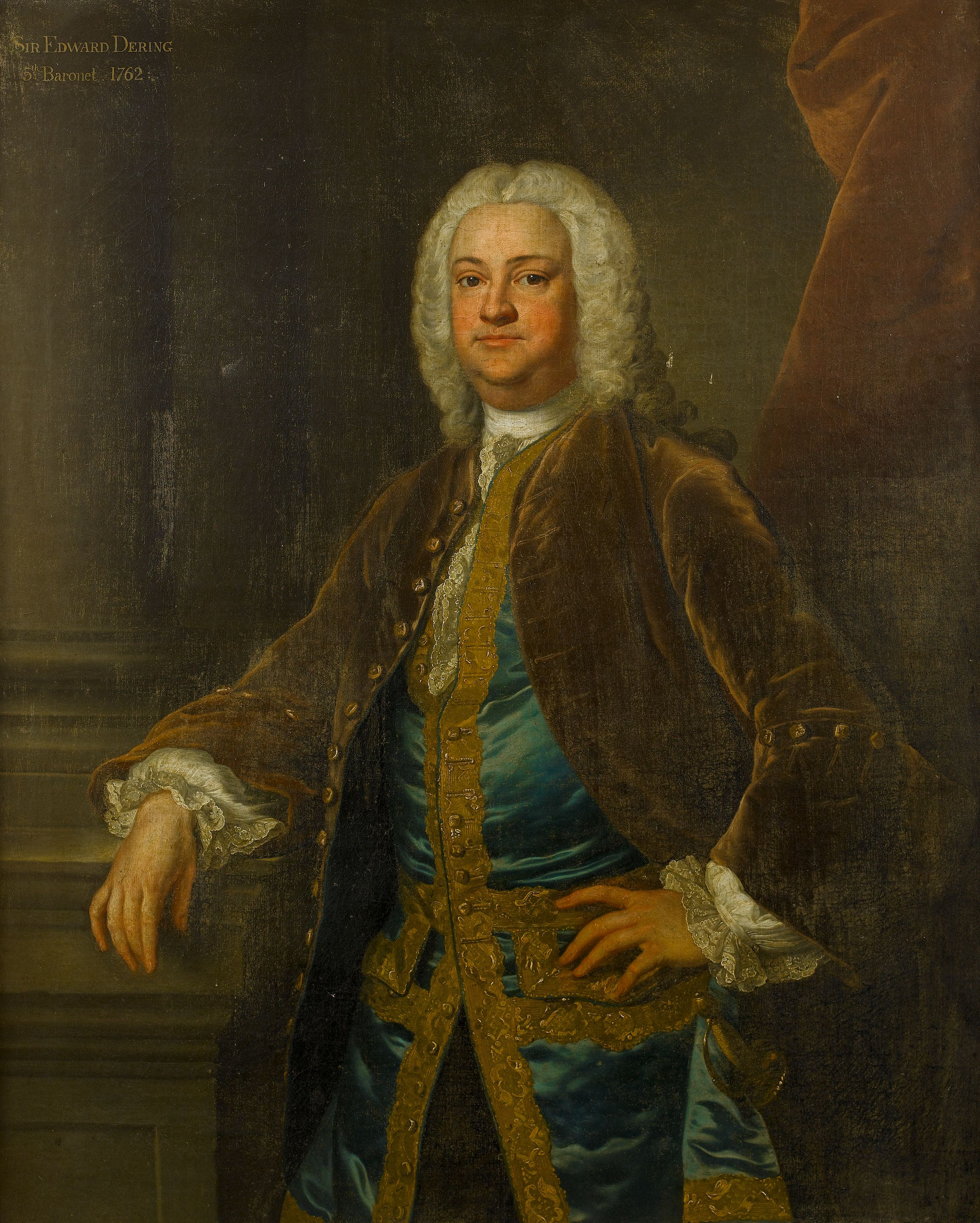
Sir Edward Dering, 5th Baronet, painting by John Theodore Heins

Sir Edward Dering, 5th Baronet (1705 – 15 April 1762) was an English politician.

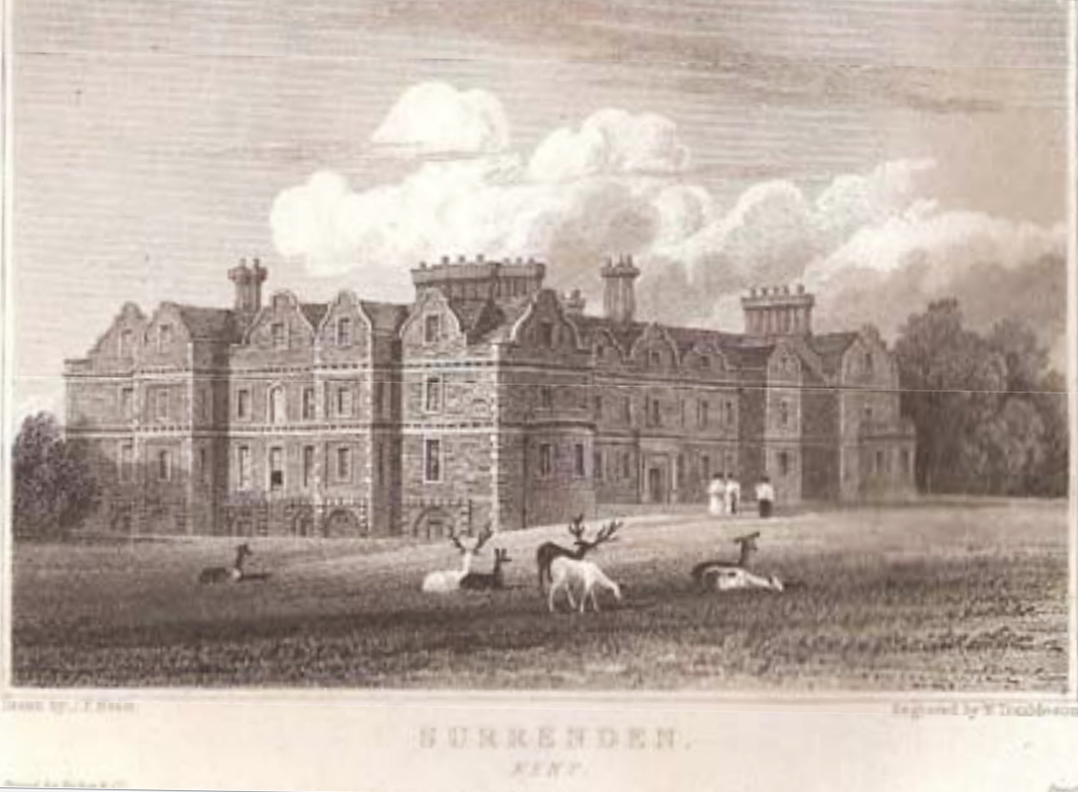
Suurenden House, Kent in 1826 - seat of the Dering family

== Early life ==
Edward Dering was the elder son and heir of Sir Cholmeley Dering, 4th Baronet of Surrenden in Pluckley, Kent by his wife Ellen, only child of Edward Fisher of Mitcham, Surrey. He succeeded to the baronetcy in 1711, while still a child, following his father's death in a duel; his mother had died in 1707.

He entered Westminster School in 1719 and matriculated at Oriel College, Oxford on 31 January 1721/2, where he graduated MA on 17 December 1725.

== Career ==
Dering's political career began when he stood for Member of Parliament for Kent in the election of 1727; he was unsuccessful on that occasion, but was returned unopposed in a by-election in 1733 following the death of Sir Robert Furnese. He retained the seat in the elections of 1734, 1741 and 1747 but was defeated in 1754.

Politically, Dering was a Tory, and consistently voted against the Whig government. He was to have had a seat at the Board of Trade had Frederick, Prince of Wales succeeded to the throne.

== Personal life ==
Dering was married twice: firstly, 24 February 1727/8 at St George the Martyr, Queen Square, London to Elizabeth daughter and coheiress of Charles Henshaw by his wife Elizabeth, daughter (and sole heiress in her issue) of Edward Roper of Well Hall, Eltham, great-great-grandson of William and Margaret Roper. She was buried at Pluckley 17 March 1734/5. Dering remarried some six months later, on 11 September 1735, at St Anne's Church, Soho, to Mary, widow of Henry Mompesson, and daughter and coheiress of Charles Fotherby of Barham Court, Kent, by Mary daughter of George Elcocke. She died on 16 December 1775.

Sir Edward Dering died on 15 April, and was buried at Pluckley on 22 April 1762, leaving issue from both marriages. His heir was Edward, his elder son by Elizabeth Henshaw.

Peerage of Great Britain
Preceded by Sir Robert Furnese; Sir Roger Meredith	Member of Parliament for Kent; 1733–1754; With: Sir Roger Meredith 1733–1734; The Viscount Vane 1734–1735; Sir Christopher Powell 1735–1741; Sir Roger Twisden 1741–1754	Succeeded by Hon. Robert Fairfax; Hon. Lewis Watson
Baronetage of England
Preceded by Cholmeley Dering	Baronet (of Surrenden Dering); 1711–1762	Succeeded by Edward Dering
