= Sir William Twysden, 3rd Baronet =

English politician

Sir William Twysden, 3rd Baronet (11 December 1635 – 27 November 1697), of Roydon Hall in Kent, was an English landowner and member of parliament.

== Early life ==
He was the eldest son of Sir Roger Twysden, 2nd Baronet and Isabella Saunders, daughter of Sir Nicholas Saunders, and succeeded to the baronetcy on 27 June 1672.

== Career ==
He entered Parliament in 1685 as member for Kent, and subsequently also represented Appleby, and was elected for New Romney although he never sat for the constituency.

== Personal life ==
He married Frances Cross, daughter of Josiah Cross, and they had ten children including Sir Thomas Twysden, 4th Baronet (c. 1676–1712) and Sir William Twysden, 5th Baronet (1677–1751), who was the grandfather of Frances Twysden.

Parliament of England
Preceded by Edward Dering; Sir Vere Fane	Member of Parliament for Kent; 1685–1689; With: Sir John Knatchbull	Succeeded by Sir John Knatchbull; Sir Vere Fane
Preceded by William Cheyne; Sir John Walter	Member of Parliament for Appleby; 1695–1697; With: Sir Christopher Musgrave	Succeeded by Sir Christopher Musgrave; Sir John Walter
Baronetage of England
Preceded by Roger Twysden	Baronet (of Roydon Hall); 1672–1697	Succeeded by Thomas Twysden
