= Sir William Twysden, 1st Baronet =

English politician

Sir William Twysden, 1st Baronet (1566–1628) was an English politician who sat in the House of Commons at various times between 1593 and 1628.

== Life ==
Twysden was the son of Roger Twysden, of Roydon Hall, East Peckham, and his wife Anne Wyatt, daughter of Sir Thomas Wyatt the younger of Allington Castle, Kent. He was admitted to Gray's Inn on 28 October 1584 and succeeded his father in the estate at East Peckham in November 1603. He was appointed a Gentleman Usher of the Privy Chamber to James I of England and knighted at Charterhouse on 11 May 1603.

In 1593, he was elected Member of Parliament for Clitheroe, in 1601 MP for Helston and in 1606 MP for Thetford. He was created a baronet on 29 June 1611. In 1614, he was re-elected MP for Thetford and finally served as MP for Winchelsea from 1628 until his death.

Twysden was a great collector of manuscripts and knew Hebrew, Greek, and other languages.

He died in his 63rd year and was buried at East Peckham with a monumental inscription. He had married Lady Anne Finch, daughter of Sir Moyle Finch, 1st Baronet and Elizabeth Finch, 1st Countess of Winchilsea (nee Heneage), by whom he had five sons and two daughters. Anne was a writer, though most of her work is lost. His son Roger succeeded him in the baronetcy. His second son was Sir Thomas Twisden, 1st Baronet of a new creation, and a judge of the Court of King's Bench: he changed the spelling of the family name. Sir William's daughter Elizabeth married Sir Hugh Cholmeley, 1st Baronet. Another daughter Anne married Sir Christopher Yelverton, 1st Baronet.

Parliament of England
Preceded by Robert Pilkington; John White	Member of Parliament for Clitheroe; 1593; With: John Chamberlain	Succeeded by William Holte; George Rotheram
Preceded by William Cooke; Nicholas Saunders	Member of Parliament for Helston; 1601; With: Hannibal Vyvyan	Succeeded by Sir John Leigh; John Bogans
Preceded by Bassingbourne Gawdy; Sir William Paddy	Member of Parliament for Thetford; 1606–1614; With: Sir William Paddy 1606–1611; Framlingham Gawdy 1614	Succeeded by Framlingham Gawdy; Sir Thomas Holland
Preceded by Roger Twysden; Nicholas Saunders	Member of Parliament for Winchelsea; 1628; With: Ralph Freeman	Vacant No parliaments summoned until 1640 Title next held by Nicholas Crisp; John Finch
Baronetage of England
New title	Baronet (of Roydon Hall); 1611–1628	Succeeded by Roger Twysden
