= Powell baronets of Broadway (1698) =

Powell baronets
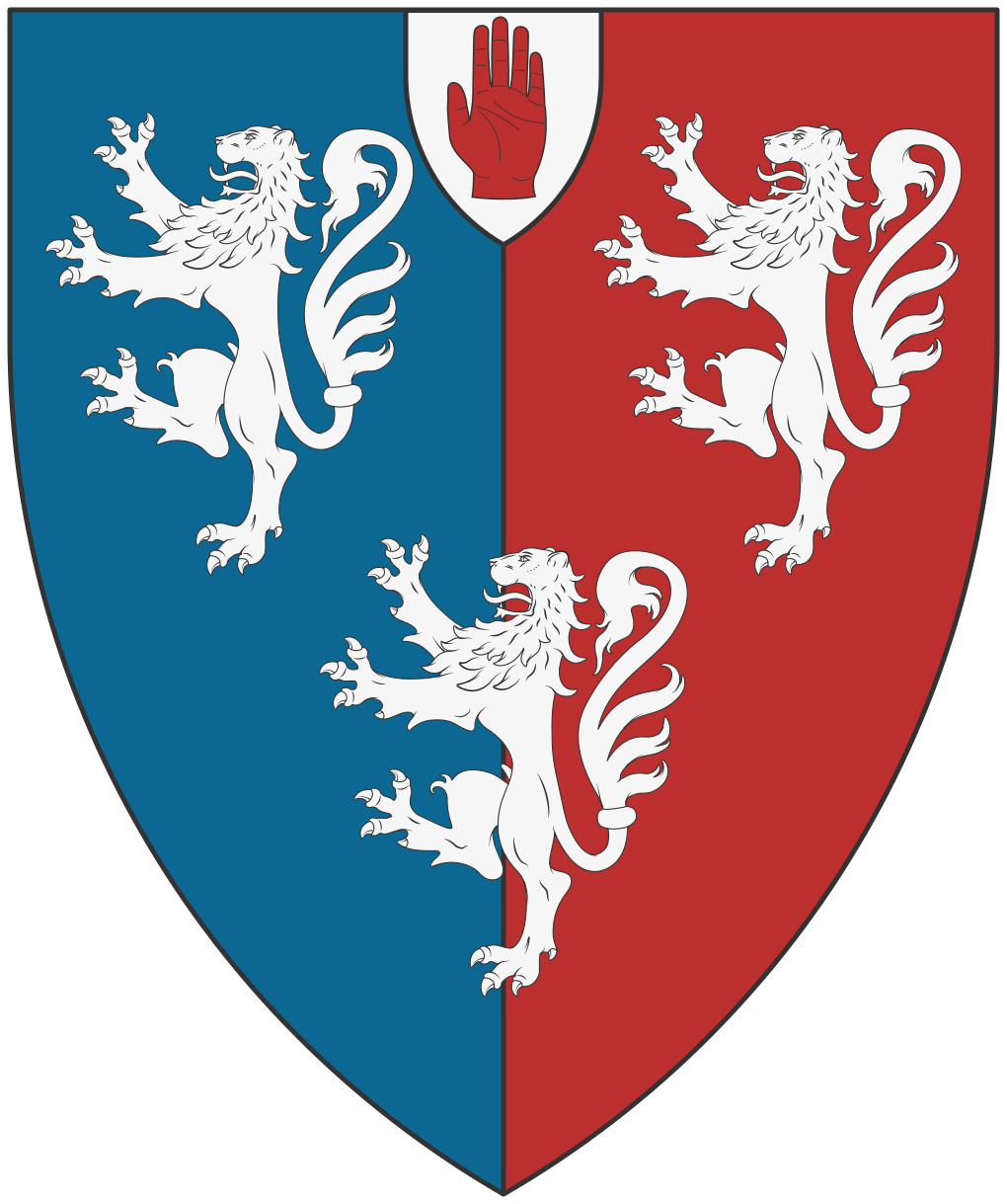
- Escutcheon of the Powell baronets of Broadway
- Creation date: 1698
- Status: extinct
- Extinction date: 1721
- Arms: Per pale azure and gules, three lioncels rampant argent

The Powell baronetcy, of Broadway near Laugharne in the County of Carmarthen, was created in the Baronetage of England on 19 July 1698 for Thomas Powell, son of the judge Sir John Powell. He was Member of Parliament for Monmouth from 1705 to 1708, and for Carmarthenshire from 1710 to 1715.

The title became extinct on the death of the 2nd Baronet in 1721.

== Powell baronets, of Broadway (1698) ==
- Sir Thomas Powell, 1st Baronet (c. 1665–1720)
- Sir Herbert Powell, 2nd Baronet (c. 1700–1721)

== Notes ==
Baronetage of England
Preceded by Germain baronets	Powell baronets of Broadway; 19 July 1698	Succeeded by Clarke baronets
