= Bradbourne House =

Grade I listed building in Kent, England

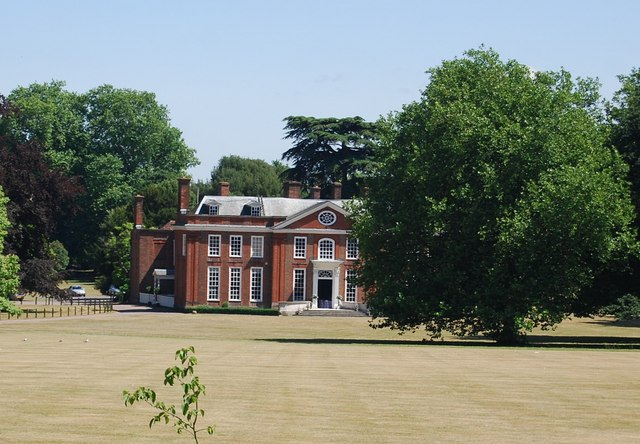

- Location within Kent
- 51.29484°N 0.44207°E

Site notes
- Website: bradbournehousekent.co.uk

Listed Building – Grade I
- Official name: Bradbourne House
- Designated: 1 August 1952
- Reference no.: 1070507

Bradbourne House is a Queen Anne style country house near East Malling, Kent. It set in 20 acres (81,000 m^{2}) of parkland.

== Location ==
The house is between the A20 road and M20 motorway and East Malling railway station.

== History ==
The house was originally built during the Tudor period, and retains some of the original features in the kitchen. The north front is constructed from red brick with orange dressings. It was extended and altered between 1713 and 1715 by Sir Thomas Twysden; much of the panelling in the house dates from this era. Additional improvements were made in 1748, including a new attic wing. It was internally refurbished in 1774, and fitted with a new three-bay bow along the house's south front. The house was owned by the Twisden family until 1937 when the last baronet, Sir John Ramskill Twisden, died.

In 1938, the estate was purchased by the East Malling Trust for Horticultural Research, together with around 200 acres (0.81 km^{2}) of adjoining land. The Trust's income supports horticultural research at the nearby East Malling Research Station. It was Grade I listed in 1952.

The house is occasionally open to the public and offers guided tours, as is the collection of trained trees alongside the walled garden. It has become a popular venue for weddings.

In 2018, nearby residents complained over plans to turn a former research site owned by East Malling Trust near the house into 400 new homes. The trust explained that the money gained from selling the land to developers would be re-invested in Bradbourne House and gardens.
