= Caleb Banks (politician) =

English politician (1659–1696)

Member of Parliament
- In office 1691–1696
- Preceded by: Joseph Williamson; Francis Clerke
- Succeeded by: Robert Crawford; Thomas King
- Constituency: Rochester (1691–1695); Queenborough (1695–1696)
- In office 1685–1689
- Preceded by: William Glanville; Gerard Gore
- Succeeded by: Robert Crawford; James Herbert
- Constituency: Queenborough (1685–1689); Maidstone (1689)

Personal details
- Born: 18 September 1659
- Died: 13 September 1696 (aged 36)
- Spouse: Elizabeth Fortrey
- Parent: John Banks (father)
- Education: Queens' College, Cambridge

Caleb Banks (18 September 1659 – 13 September 1696) was an English politician who sat in the House of Commons between 1685 and 1696.

== Biography ==
Banks was the son of Sir John Banks, 1st Baronet and his wife Elizabeth Dethick, daughter of Sir John Dethick. He was educated at Queens' College, Cambridge and admitted at Gray's Inn in February 1675. He was a pupil of John Locke who accompanied him in France his travels in France from 1677 to 1679. Banks stood unsuccessfully for parliament at Winchelsea in 1679 when he was under age. He was a captain of the militia for Kent and a Deputy Lieutenant for the county from 1683 with a short interruption in 1688.

Banks was elected Member of Parliament (MP) for Queenborough in 1685 and for Maidstone in 1689. In 1689 he became a J.P. and a commissioner for assessment. In 1691 he was elected MP for Rochester until 1695, and was an assistant warden of Rochester Bridge from 1693. He was elected MP for Queenborough again in 1695 until his death in 1696.

Banks suffered from ill health throughout his life and died aged 36 before his father. He was buried at Aylesford Church.

Banks married Elizabeth Fortrey, daughter of Samuel Fortrey but there were no children, rendering his father's baronetcy extinct.

Parliament of England
Preceded by William Glanville; Gerard Gore	Member of Parliament for Queenborough; 1685–1689; With: Sir John Godwin	Succeeded by Robert Crawford; James Herbert
Preceded by Sir Joseph Williamson; Francis Clerke	Member of Parliament for Rochester; 1691–1695; With: Sir Joseph Williamson	Succeeded by Sir Joseph Williamson; Admiral Sir Cloudesley Shovell
Preceded by Sir John Banks, Bt; Robert Crawford	Member of Parliament for Queenborough; 1695–1696; With: Robert Crawford	Succeeded by Robert Crawford; Thomas King
