= John Finch (MP for Winchelsea) =

English politician

John Finch (died 1642) was an English politician who sat in the House of Commons at various times between 1624 and 1642.

Finch was probably the son of Thomas Finch, 2nd Earl of Winchilsea and his wife Cecile Wentworth.

In 1624, Finch was elected Member of Parliament for Winchelsea. Sir Alexander Temple tried to take the seat from the control of the Finch family and succeeded in having Finch's return invalidated. However Temple was defeated in the subsequent by-election. In April 1640, Finch was elected MP for Winchelsea for the Short Parliament. In November 1640 he was re-elected MP for Winchelsea in the Long Parliament and sat until his death in 1642.

Finch died before February 1643 when a writ was issued for his replacement. He had been elected as John Finch Esq, but was referred to in the writ as Sir John Finch.

Parliament of England
Preceded by Sir Thomas Finch; Edward Nicholas	Member of Parliament for Winchelsea; 1624; With: Edward Nicholas	Succeeded by Roger Twysden; Ralph Freeman
Vacant No parliaments summoned 1629–40 Title last held by Sir William Twysden, Bt; Ralph Freeman	Member of Parliament for Winchelsea; 1640–1642; With: Nicholas Crisp 1640; William Smith	Succeeded by William Smith; Second seat left vacant
