= Sir Richard Head, 1st Baronet =

English politician

Sir Richard Head, 1st Baronet (ca. 1609 – 18 September 1689) was an English politician who sat in the House of Commons from 1667 to 1679.

Head was the son of Richard Head, of Rochester, and his wife Anne Hartridge, daughter of William Hartridge, of Cranbrook.

In 1667 Head was elected Member of Parliament (MP) for Rochester in the Cavalier Parliament and held the seat until 1679. He was created a baronet, of The Hermitage in the County of Kent on 19 June 1676. In 1689 Head entertained King James II and his small court as the King was about to leave the country. The king was so pleased and surprised by this hospitality that he presented Head with an emerald ring.

Head died in 1689 and by his will left several houses and lands in Higham to the mayor and citizens of Rochester for charitable purposes.

Head married firstly Elizabeth Merrick, daughter of Francis Merrick, alderman of Rochester and had three sons (including Francis Head, who died while his father was alive and Sir John Head (2nd son)) and a daughter. He married secondly, Elizabeth Willy, of Wrotham, Kent and had two sons, and three daughters.

Parliament of England
Preceded by Francis Clerke; Sir William Batten	Member of Parliament for Rochester; 1667–1679; With: Francis Clerke to Feb 1679; Sir John Banks, Bt from Feb 1679	Succeeded by Sir John Banks, Bt; Francis Barrell
Baronetage of England
New creation	Baronet (of The Hermitage); 1676–1689	Succeeded by Francis Head
