= John Sutton (Royal Navy officer) =

Royal Navy Admiral (c. 1758–1825)

Admiral Sir John Sutton KCB
- Born: 1757 or 1758
- Died: 8 August 1825 (aged 67); Ramsgate, Kent
- Military career
- Allegiance: United Kingdom
- Branch: Royal Navy
- Service years: 1775–1825
- Conflicts: American Revolutionary War; French Revolutionary Wars; Battle of Genoa; Battle of Hyères Islands; Battle of Cape St. Vincent; Napoleonic Wars
- Awards: Knight Commander of the Order of the Bath

Admiral Sir John Sutton, KCB (c. 1758 – 8 August 1825) was a Royal Navy officer of the late eighteenth and early nineteenth century who is best known for his service as captain of the ship of the line HMS Egmont during the French Revolutionary Wars, serving with the Mediterranean Fleet in several prominent engagements. He later served as a judge at the controversial Gambier court-martial in 1809.

== Life ==
Sutton was born in c. 1758, the son of Thomas Sutton of Moulsey and his wife Jane Hankey. He joined the Royal Navy during the American Revolutionary War as midshipman on board the ship of the line HMS Superb, flagship of Admiral Sir Edward Hughes in the Indian Ocean. He was wounded in an attack on the navy of Hyder Ali on 8 December 1780 at Mangalore, during the Second Anglo-Mysore War and rewarded with command of the sloop HMS Nymph.

At the start of the French Revolutionary Wars in 1793 Sutton was promoted to post captain and took command of first the frigate HMS Romulus and then the ship of the line HMS Egmont, which was attached to the Mediterranean Fleet. In 1795 Egmont fought at the battles of Genoa and the Hyères Islands, suffering casualties on the latter when a cannon burst. The following year he served on an operation to attack a French squadron in the harbour of Tunis and Sutton was then particularly tasked with the orderly evacuation of the British base on Corsica following the Spanish entry into the war on the French side.

In 1797, Egmont fought in line at the Battle of Cape St. Vincent and was then transferred to the Channel Fleet. The same year he married Frances Hotham, daughter of Lord Hotham. Sutton moved to HMS Superb shortly afterwards, and in 1801 was appointed Captain of the Fleet under William Cornwallis. At the outbreak of the Napoleonic Wars in 1803, Sutton was given command of HMS Mars before being promoted in 1804 to rear-admiral. He then served as superintendent of Plymouth Dockyard, and in that capacity was called to serve on the panel of judges at the court-martial of Lord Gambier following the chaotic Battle of Basque Roads in the summer of 1809, at which Gambier was controversially acquitted. In October 1809 he was promoted to vice-admiral and shortly afterwards was appointed commander-in-chief of the Halifax station.

In 1815 he was made a Knight Commander of the Order of the Bath and in 1819 was promoted to full admiral. He died at Ramsgate, Kent aged 67 on 8 August 1825. He had married in 1797 Frances Hotham, daughter of Beaumont Hotham, 2nd Baron Hotham, and a first cousin. They had one son, John Thomas Sutton, who died aged 22 in 1835.
