= Banks baronets =

Set index for Banks baronets

There have been two baronetcies created for persons with the surname Banks, on in the Baronetage of England and one in the Baronetage of Great Britain. Both creations became extinct on the death of the first holder.

- Banks baronets of London (1661): see Sir John Banks, 1st Baronet (1627–1699)
- Banks baronets of Revesby Abbey (1781): see Sir Joseph Banks, 1st Baronet (1743–1820)
