= Powell baronets of Ewhurst (1661) =

Escutcheon of the Powell baronets of Ewhurst

The Powell baronetcy, of Ewhurst in the County of Sussex, was created in the Baronetage of England on 10 May 1661 for the landowner Nathaniel Powell.

The 4th Baronet represented Kent in the House of Commons. The title became extinct on his death in 1742.

== Powell baronets, of Ewhurst (1661) ==
- Sir Nathaniel Powell, 1st Baronet (died 1675)
- Sir Nathaniel Powell, 2nd Baronet (c. 1640–c. 1707)
- Sir Nathaniel Powell, 3rd Baronet (c. 1688–1708)
- Sir Christopher Powell, 4th Baronet (c. 1690–1742)
