= Lewis Watson, 1st Baron Sondes =

British Whig politician and peer

Lewis Watson, 1st Baron Sondes (28 November 1728 – 30 March 1795), called Hon. Lewis Monson before 1746 and Hon. Lewis Watson from 1746 to 1760, was a British Whig politician and peer.

== Biography ==
Lewis Monson was the second son of John Monson, 1st Baron Monson, and Lady Margaret Watson, youngest daughter of Lewis Watson, 1st Earl of Rockingham who had married Catherine Sondes, daughter of George Sondes, 1st Earl of Feversham of Lees Court, Kent. Through this marriage Lewis Watson inherited Lees Court on the death without issue of his brother-in-law Louis de Duras, Marquis of Blanquefort and 2nd Earl of Feversham in 1709, Lord Duras had married Mary Sondes, Catherine's sister. In 1714 Lewis Watson was created Earl of Rockingham and Viscount Sondes.

On the Death of Thomas Watson 3rd Earl of Rockingham in 1745 the titles became extinct, but the estates of Rockingham Castle and Lees Court passed to Lewis Monson.

He was educated at Westminster School between 1737 and 1745. He assumed the surname of Watson in 1746 after inheriting the estates of his cousin, Thomas Watson, 3rd Earl of Rockingham. Watson afterwards went on the Grand Tour with his second cousin the Earl of Malton (later Marquess of Rockingham) and his third cousin Thomas Pelham.

While abroad in Europe in 1750, his third cousin once removed, the Duke of Newcastle, arranged for Watson to be returned in April as Member of Parliament for Boroughbridge in place of the Earl of Dalkeith, who had died. That autumn, the three kinsmen visited Hanover, where Newcastle presented them, together with Viscount Downe and three other young Englishmen, to George II of Great Britain, who was holding court in the Electorate. The king was not pleased and snubbed the party when they were presented.

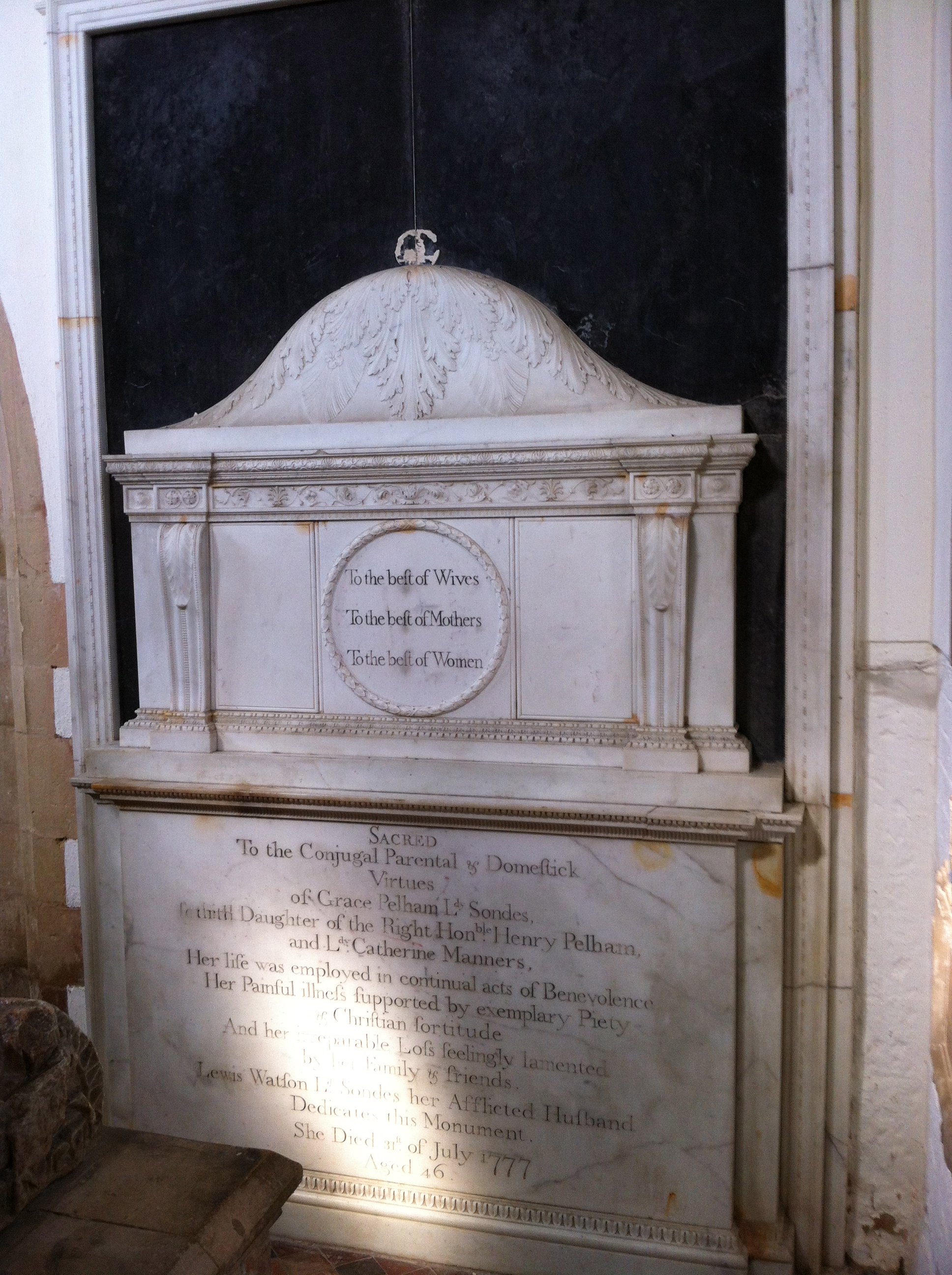
Memorial to Grace, wife of the 1st Baron Sondes, in St. Leonard's Church, Rockingham.

On 12 October 1752, he married his third cousin Grace Pelham (d. 30 July 1777), the third surviving daughter and co-heiress of Prime Minister Henry Pelham, Newcastle's brother. They had four sons:

- Lewis Watson, 2nd Baron Sondes (18 April 1754 – 21 June 1806).
- Rev. Hon. Henry Watson (20 April 1755 – 1 August 1833), rector of East Carlton and Kettering.
- Hon. Charles Watson (24 October 1761 – 16 April 1769).
- Hon. George Watson (1768–1824).

In February 1754, his father-in-law procured for him the lucrative sinecure of auditor of the imprests, in succession to William Benson. The by-election that followed his appointment was not contested. In the 1754 general election that spring, Newcastle had him returned for Boroughbridge again; Watson also led the poll in Kent, where he and Robert Fairfax stood as Whigs and defeated Sir Edward Dering, one of the sitting Tory members. Watson chose to sit for Kent. However, he aspired to the House of Lords, as he enjoyed the estates of the extinct earldom of Rockingham and could well afford to support a title. Nor did he wish to stand for the county again. Newcastle pressed his claims strongly on the King and was ultimately successful; Watson was created Baron Sondes, of Lees Court in the Peerage of Great Britain on 22 May 1760, the title being linked to his ancestors and vacated his seat in the Commons. In 1785, the office of auditor of the imprests was abolished, and he received an annuity of £7,000 a year for life in compensation.

He died on 30 March 1795 and was succeeded in his title by his eldest son, Lewis Watson. Sondes was buried at Rockingham, Northamptonshire.

Parliament of Great Britain
Preceded by Earl of Dalkeith; William Murray	Member of Parliament for Boroughbridge; 1750–1754; With: William Murray	Succeeded by John Fuller; William Murray
Preceded by Sir Roger Twisden; Sir Edward Dering	Member of Parliament for Kent; 1754–1760; With: Hon. Robert Fairfax	Succeeded by Sir Wyndham Knatchbull-Wyndham; Hon. Robert Fairfax
Peerage of Great Britain
New creation	Baron Sondes; 1760–1795	Succeeded by Lewis Watson
