= Edward Nicholas =

17th-century English courtier and politician

Sir Edward Nicholas
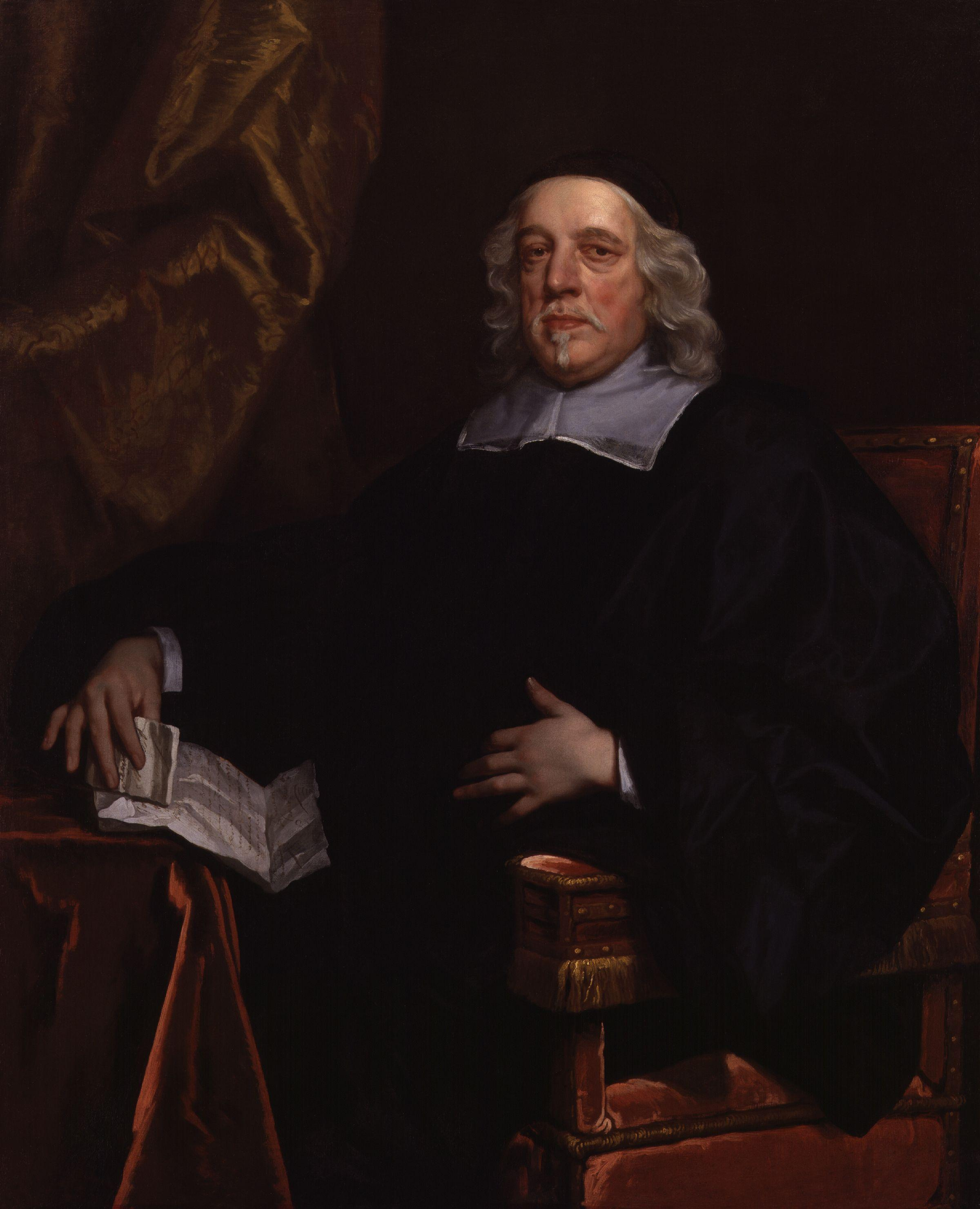
- Portrait by Peter Lely
- Born: 4 April 1593; Wiltshire, England
- Died: 1669 (aged 75–76); West Horsley, England
- Education: Winchester College, The Queen's College, Oxford
- Spouse: Jane Jay

Sir Edward Nicholas (4 April 1593 – 1669) was an English officeholder and politician who served as Secretary of State to Charles I and Charles II. He also sat in the House of Commons at various times between 1621 and 1629.

He served as secretary to Edward la Zouche and the Duke of Buckingham in the Admiralty and became a clerk of the Privy Council. He supported the Royalist cause in the English Civil War and accompanied the court into exile, before assuming the post of Secretary of State on the Restoration.

== Early life and career ==
Nicholas was the eldest son of John Nicholas of a Wiltshire family. He was educated at Salisbury Grammar School, Winchester College, and The Queen's College, Oxford.

After studying law at the Middle Temple, in 1618 Nicholas became secretary to Edward la Zouche, 11th Baron Zouche, lord warden and admiral of the Cinque Ports. In 1621 he was elected as a Member of Parliament for Winchelsea. He was re-elected as one of the Members for Winchelsea in 1624 for what became known as the Happy Parliament.

Nicholas kept diaries of all the parliaments in which he sat. When Zouche resigned his office of lord warden to the Duke of Buckingham, the Duke, upon Zouche's recommendation, on 9 December 1624 appointed Nicholas as his secretary for the business of the Cinque Ports. In 1625 Nicholas became the first holder of the office of Secretary to the Admiralty; shortly afterwards he was appointed an extra clerk of the privy council, with duties relating to Admiralty business. In 1628 he was elected a Member for Dover and sat until 1629, when King Charles decided to rule without parliament and in the event did so for eleven years. Appended to a copy of Charles's speech at the dissolution of this parliament on 10 March 1629 is a poem of twenty-four verses in Nicholas's hand, beginning:

The wisest king did wonder when he spide
The nobles march on foot, their vassals ride
His majestie may wonder now to see
Some that would needs be king as well as he.

== Civil War and Restoration ==
From 1635 to 1641 Nicholas was one of the clerks in ordinary to the council. In this situation, he had much business to transact in connection with the levy of ship-money. When in 1641 King Charles I went to Scotland, he remained in London and was responsible for keeping the king informed of the proceedings of parliament. When Charles returned to London, Nicholas was knighted and appointed a privy councillor and a Secretary of State, in which capacity he attended the king while the court was at Oxford and carried out the business of the Treaty of Uxbridge.

Throughout the Civil War, Nicholas was one of Charles's wisest and most loyal advisers. He arranged the details of the king's surrender to the Scots on 5 May 1646, although he does not appear to have advised or even to have approved of the step. He also had the duty of treating for the capitulation of Oxford on 24 June 1646, which included permission for Nicholas himself to retire abroad with his family. He went to France, being recommended by the king to the confidence of the Prince of Wales.

In 1648 Nicholas wrote a pamphlet, An Apology for the Honorable Nation of the Jews, which called for the readmission of the Jews to England. It is one of the few examples of pro-admission writing that does not also call for the conversion of the Jews and is cited by Menasseh Ben Israel in his Humble Addresses, although Cecil Roth wonders whether the pamphlet might actually have been written by a Jew.

After the king's death, Nicholas remained on the continent, concerting measures on behalf of the exiled Charles II with Edward Hyde and other royalists, but the hostility of Queen Henrietta Maria deprived him of any real influence in the counsels of the young sovereign. He lived at the Hague and elsewhere in a state of poverty which hampered his power to serve Charles, but which the latter did nothing to relieve. Charles appointed him Principal Secretary of State while in exile in 1654. In the late 1650s, he was active in Charles' exile Privy Council at Bruges and Brussels, and personally administered the oath of Lord Chancellor of England to Edward Hyde in January 1658. As an enthusiastic Royalist, in a letter dated 10 September 1657 to Edward Hyde, Nicholas speaks of Cromwell,

... I conceive his Majesty should do well to set a good price on his head and all the heads of the chief commanders in Ireland and also in Scotland ...

On 25 May 1660, Charles II landed at Dover, marking the beginning of the Restoration. It is unknown if Nicholas accompanied Charles, however he did attend the first meeting of the Privy Council on May 27th at Canterbury, where the former Protectorate parliamentarian William Morice was sworn the other Principal Secretary of State, a position which was previously left vacant during Charles II's exile. The system of two Principal Secretaries of State would eventually evolve into the offices of Southern Secretary and Northern Secretary, and as a result, Nicholas and Morice are retroactively considered the first holders of those offices. Nicholas remained an active Secretary of State and Privy Councillor for the first three years of the Restoration, until he resigned the position of Secretary of State on 15 October 1662 of that year, being replaced that day by Charles's favourite Henry Bennet. After his resignation, Nicholas continued to be occasionally active as a Privy Councillor.

== Later life and death ==
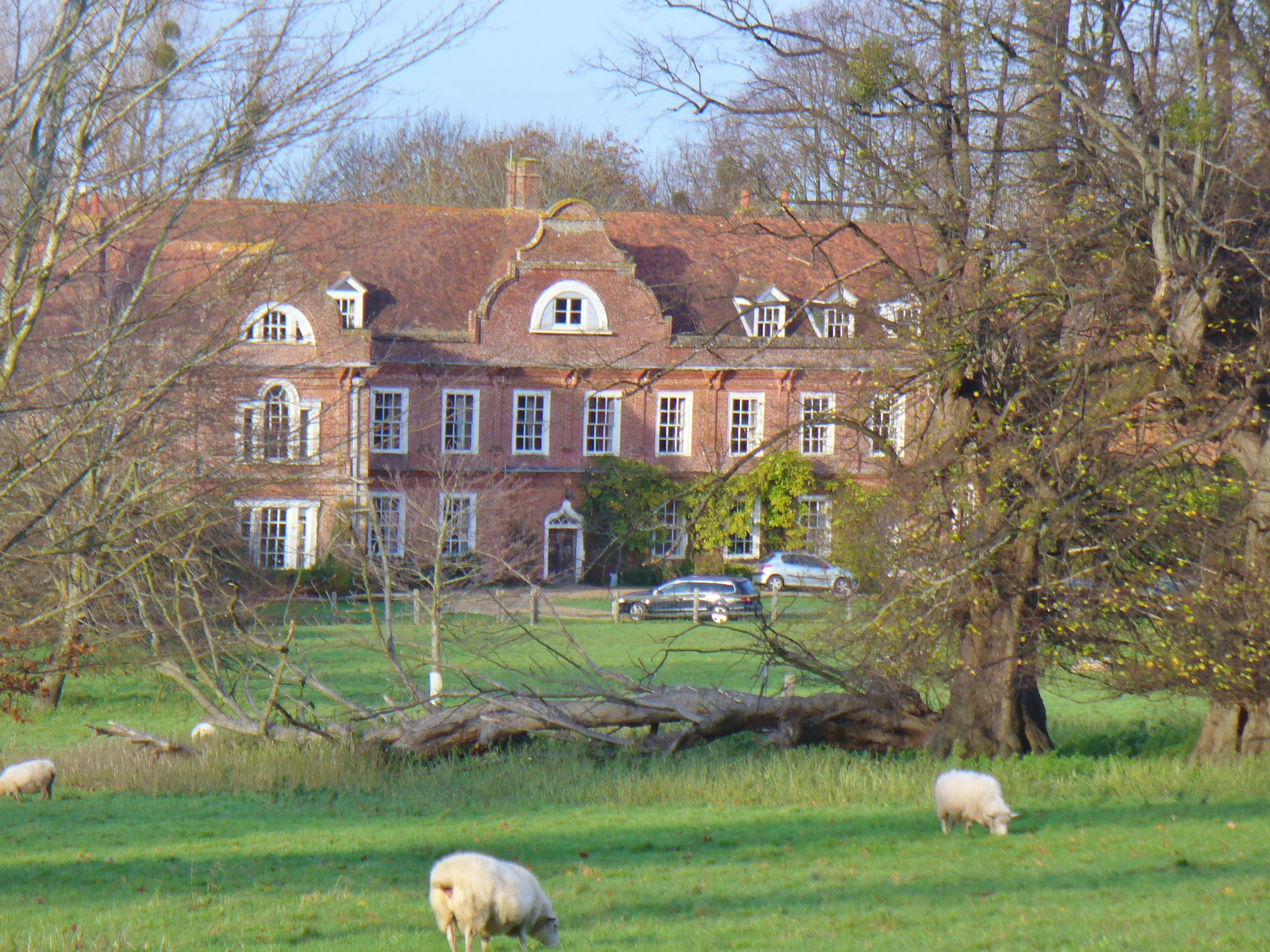
West Horsley Place

He received a grant of money and the offer of a peerage, which he felt too poor to accept. He retired to a country seat in Surrey (the manor of West Horsley) which he purchased from Carew Raleigh, son of Sir Walter Raleigh, and there he lived till his death in 1669.

== Family ==
Nicholas married Jane Jay, a daughter of Henry Jay, an alderman of London and had several sons and daughters. His eldest son was Sir John Nicholas, a Clerk of the Signet and Clerk of the Privy Council. His daughter Susannah married as his second wife the Irish statesman George Lane, 1st Viscount Lanesborough: like her father, he spent years in exile with Charles II, and by 1659 the couple were almost destitute, but was well rewarded after the Restoration. Susannah died in 1671.

His younger brother Matthew Nicholas (1594–1661) was successively Dean of Bristol, canon of Westminster and Dean of St Paul's. His country seat was at Sunninghill in Berkshire.

== Correspondence ==
The collected correspondences of Nicholas were published in three volumes by the Royal Historical Society in 1920.

== Arms ==
Paternal arms

Augmented arms

The arms of Nicholas’s father were: Argent, a fess wavy between three ravens sable, a differencing of the arms of Nicholas of Winterborne Earls, Wiltshire.

In 1649, augmented arms were granted to Sir Edward Nicholas, blazoned Argent, on a cross gules an imperial crown or, which he bore in the 1st & 4th quarters, with his paternal arms in the 2nd and 3rd quarters.

Parliament of England
Preceded by William Binge; Thomas Godfrey	Member of Parliament for Winchelsea; 1621–1624; With: Thomas Finch 1621–1622; John Finch 1624	Succeeded by Roger Twysden
Preceded by Sir John Hippisley; John Pringle	Member of Parliament for Dover; 1628–1629; With: Sir John Hippisley	Parliament suspended until 1640
Political offices
Preceded by Sir Henry Vane	Secretary of State; 1641–1646; With: Lucius Cary, 2nd Viscount Falkland 1642–1643; George Digby, 2nd Earl of Bristol 1643–1645	Vacant
Preceded by The Viscount Falkland	Lord Privy Seal; 1643–1644	Succeeded by The Earl of Bath
Preceded by Sir Peter Wyche	Custos Rotulorum of Middlesex; 1643–1646	Interregnum
Vacant Interregnum	Custos Rotulorum of Middlesex; 1660–1669	Succeeded by The Earl of Craven
Preceded by —	Secretary of State for the Southern Department; 1660–1662	Succeeded by The Lord Arlington
