= Sir Thomas Twisden, 1st Baronet =

English lawyer and politician

Sir Thomas Twisden, 1st Baronet (2 January 1602 – 2 January 1683) was an English lawyer and politician who sat in the House of Commons of England in two periods between 1646 and 1660. He was a High Court judge who presided at the trial of the regicides.

== Biography ==
Twisden was the second son of Sir William Twysden, 1st Baronet of Roydon, East Peckham, Kent and his wife Lady Anne Finch, daughter of Sir Moyle Finch. He was admitted at Emmanuel College, Cambridge in 1614. He was admitted at the Inner Temple in November 1617 and called to the Bar in 1626. In 1646 he became a Bencher. He changed the spelling of his surname to Twisden.

Twisden was Recorder of Maidstone, and in 1646, he was elected Member of Parliament for Maidstone in the latter part of the Long Parliament but was excluded in 1648 under Pride's Purge.

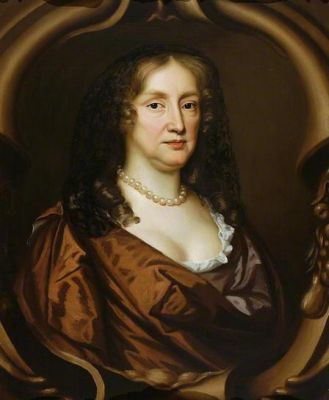
Jane Lady Twysden by Mary Beale

Twisden became Serjeant at Law in 1654 and purchased the manor of Bradbourne House. East Malling, Kent in 1656. After the Restoration of Charles II, he was MP for Maidstone again in 1660. He became a judge of the Court of King's Bench, and was knighted in 1660. He presided at the trials of the regicides, and later those of Sir Henry Vane the Younger for treason, and of John Bunyan and George Fox. Despite his persecution of leading Quakers like Bunyan and Fox he was, by the standards of the age he lived in, generally considered a mild enough man in religious matters. He was created a baronet, of Twisden of Bradbourne, Kent, on 13 June 1666. He retired from the Bench in 1678, pleading age and ill health.

== Family ==
Twisden married Jane Tomlinson, daughter of John Tomlinson, of St Michael's-le-Belfry, York, and Eleanor Dodsworth, and sister of the regicide Matthew Tomlinson (whose life was spared at the Restoration), and had eleven children. His son Roger succeeded to the baronetcy and his daughter Margaret married Sir Thomas Style, 2nd Baronet. His brother was the baronet under the original spelling Sir Roger Twysden, 2nd Baronet.

Parliament of England
| Preceded by Sir Francis Barnham; Sir Humfrey Tufton, 1st Baronet | Member of Parliament for Maidstone; 1646–1648; With: Sir Humfrey Tufton, 1st Baronet | Succeeded by Not represented in Rump or Barebones Parliaments |
| Preceded by Not represented in restored Rump | Member of Parliament for Maidstone; 1660; With: Sir Robert Barnham, 1st Baronet | Succeeded by Sir Robert Barnham, 1st Baronet; Sir Edward Hales, 2nd Baronet |
Baronetage of England
| New creation | Baronet of Bradbourne; 1666–1683 | Succeeded by Roger Twisden |
