= East Malling =

Village in Kent, England

Coordinates: 51.287568°N 0.43897199°E

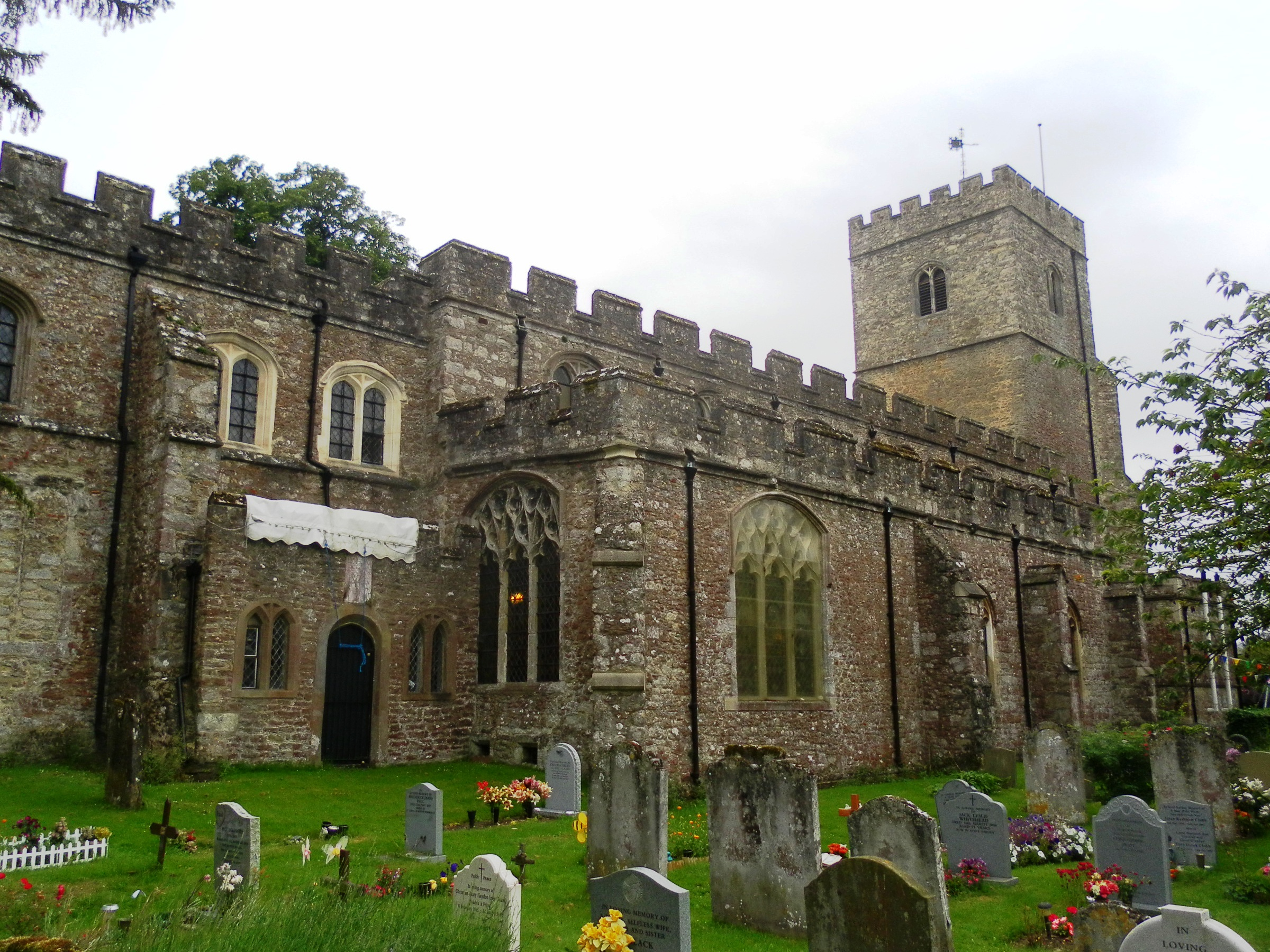
- St James the Great's Church

- Location within Kent
- Civil parish: East Malling and Larkfield
- District: Tonbridge and Malling
- Shire county: Kent
- Region: South East
- Country: England
- Sovereign state: United Kingdom
- Post town: WEST MALLING
- Postcode district: ME19
- Dialling code: 01732
- UK Parliament: Maidstone and Malling

East Malling is a village in the borough of Tonbridge and Malling, Kent, in the part of the civil parish of East Malling and Larkfield lying south of the A20 road. In 2019 the ward had an estimated population of 5,478.

== History ==
The earliest recorded reference to East Malling is "in a Charter of King Edmund I (reigned 939 – 946 AD) which refers to 'East Mealing', describing a gallows." East Malling was recorded in the Domesday Book of 1086 as Mellingete.

Farming was common in the area until the 1960s especially of hops and fruit orchards, and some of this activity remains today including the East Malling Research Station. After World War II, Malling Rural District Council developed the Step Stile and Clare Park housing estates.

== Amenities ==
The ragstone church is dedicated to St James the Great, and forms part of a Conservation Area on the High Street. It boasts of a clerestoried nave dating from the 14th century. Within the church lies Sir Thomas Twisden, a high court judge who presided at the trials of the regicides of Charles I.

St James is the primary school, and the main secondary school for the area is The Malling School.

== Transport ==
East Malling railway station is served by trains to Maidstone, Ashford and London.

== Media ==
Much of the location filming for the 1960s BBC comedy programme Mr Pastry took place in the countryside around East Malling. Richard Hearne who starred had lived in a neighbouring village, St Mary Platt, and knew the area well.

== Notable people ==
- Paxton Whitehead (1937–2023), actor and theatre director, born in East Malling
- Sir Thomas Twisden, 1st Baronet (1602–1683), owner of Bradbourne House from 1656.

== Climate ==
Climate data for East Malling (1991–2020 normals, extremes 1925-)
Month	Jan	Feb	Mar	Apr	May	Jun	Jul	Aug	Sep	Oct	Nov	Dec	Year
Record high °C (°F)	17.4 (63.3)	19.1 (66.4)	22.2 (72.0)	27.1 (80.8)	32.6 (90.7)	33.3 (91.9)	38.4 (101.1)	37.4 (99.3)	32.4 (90.3)	27.8 (82.0)	18.9 (66.0)	16.1 (61.0)	38.4 (101.1)
Mean daily maximum °C (°F)	8.0 (46.4)	8.5 (47.3)	11.0 (51.8)	14.2 (57.6)	17.3 (63.1)	20.4 (68.7)	22.8 (73.0)	22.6 (72.7)	19.5 (67.1)	15.4 (59.7)	11.2 (52.2)	8.5 (47.3)	15.0 (59.0)
Daily mean °C (°F)	5.1 (41.2)	5.3 (41.5)	7.3 (45.1)	9.6 (49.3)	12.7 (54.9)	15.6 (60.1)	17.9 (64.2)	17.8 (64.0)	14.9 (58.8)	11.6 (52.9)	7.9 (46.2)	5.5 (41.9)	11.0 (51.8)
Mean daily minimum °C (°F)	2.2 (36.0)	2.1 (35.8)	3.5 (38.3)	5.1 (41.2)	8.0 (46.4)	10.8 (51.4)	13.0 (55.4)	12.9 (55.2)	10.4 (50.7)	7.8 (46.0)	4.6 (40.3)	2.5 (36.5)	6.9 (44.4)
Record low °C (°F)	−17.8 (0.0)	−17.2 (1.0)	−10.0 (14.0)	−5.6 (21.9)	−4.4 (24.1)	−1.7 (28.9)	2.8 (37.0)	1.7 (35.1)	−0.6 (30.9)	−8.9 (16.0)	−7.8 (18.0)	−11.5 (11.3)	−17.8 (0.0)
Average precipitation mm (inches)	69.3 (2.73)	51.2 (2.02)	43.5 (1.71)	45.5 (1.79)	46.2 (1.82)	47.5 (1.87)	41.7 (1.64)	55.5 (2.19)	50.3 (1.98)	73.4 (2.89)	75.1 (2.96)	71.0 (2.80)	670.2 (26.39)
Average precipitation days (≥ 1.0 mm)	12.1	10.0	9.0	8.6	8.2	7.8	7.4	8.1	8.0	11.3	12.3	12.3	115.1
Mean monthly sunshine hours	59.5	77.0	123.0	181.2	215.8	220.1	226.6	213.1	160.7	117.9	71.3	57.1	1,723.3
Source 1: Met Office
Source 2: Starlings Roost Weather

== See also ==
- Bradbourne House
- East Malling Stream
