= Francis Barrell (died 1679) =

English lawyer and politician

Francis Barrell (c. 1627 – 10 September 1679) was an English lawyer and politician who sat in the House of Commons in 1679.

Barrell was the son of a Kentish clergyman and became serjeant at law at Rochester. He was elected Member of Parliament (MP) for Rochester on 16 August 1679 and held the seat until his death later in the year.

Barrell was buried in Rochester Cathedral where a monument was erected for him and his wife.

Barrell married Anne Somer, daughter of Richard Somer of Clifford's Inn. Anne died in 1707. Their son Francis was also MP for Rochester.

Parliament of England
Preceded by Sir Richard Head; Sir John Banks	Member of Parliament for Rochester; 1679; With: Sir John Banks	Succeeded by Sir John Banks; Francis Clerke
