= Sir Roger Twisden, 5th Baronet =

English Tory politician

Sir Roger Twisden, 5th Baronet (4 April 1705 – 7 March 1772) was an English Tory politician.

== Biography ==
Twisden was the second son of Sir Thomas Twisden, 3rd Baronet and was educated at Trinity College, Oxford. In 1736 he obtained a commission as a cornet in the 3rd Hussars. On 10 January 1737 he married Elizabeth Watton, daughter of Edward Watton of Addington, Kent. He resigned his army commission upon inherited his elder brother's baronetcy and estates on 30 July 1737.

In 1741, Twisden was returned unopposed as a Tory Member of Parliament for Kent. Despite his Toryism, he was not a Jacobite and during the Jacobite rising of 1745 he served as an officer in the Kent militia, becoming a captain in 1746. He was again elected unopposed in 1747, but declined to stand in 1754 owing to ill-health. Upon his death in 1772, he was succeeded in his title by his son, also called Roger.

Parliament of Great Britain
Preceded by Sir Christopher Powell, Bt; Sir Edward Dering, Bt	Member of Parliament for Kent; 1741–1754; With: Sir Edward Dering, Bt	Succeeded by Hon. Lewis Watson; Hon. Robert Fairfax
Baronetage of England
Preceded by Thomas Twisden	Baronet (of Bradbourne); 1737–1772	Succeeded by Roger Twisden
