= Powell baronets of Pengethly (1st creation, 1622) =

Escutcheon of the Powell baronets of Pengethly

The Powell Baronetcy, of Pengethly in the County of Hereford, was created in the Baronetage of England on 18 January 1622 for Edward Powell, an Oxford graduate, member of the Middle Temple and Master of Requests. He married Mary Vanlore, daughter of Peter Vanlore. The title became extinct on his death in 1653.

== Powell baronets, of Pengethly (1622) ==
- Sir Edward Powell, 1st Baronet (c. 1580–1653)

== Notes ==
Baronetage of England
Preceded by Mansel baronets	Powell baronets of Pengethly; 18 January 1622	Succeeded by Garrard baronets
