= Powell baronets of Birkenhead (1630) =

Escutcheon of the Powell baronets of Birkenhead

The Powell baronetcy, of Birkenhead in the County of Chester, was created in the Baronetage of England on 29 January 1630 for Thomas Powell, who had been High Sheriff of Denbighshire for 1615–6. He married Margaret Egerton, daughter of the Member of Parliament Sir John Egerton.

The 2nd Baronet was High Sheriff of Denbighshire for 1656–7. The title became extinct on his death c.1700.

== Powell baronets, of Birkenhead (1630) ==
- Sir Thomas Powell, 1st Baronet (died 1647)
- Sir Thomas Powell, 2nd Baronet (1631–c. 1700), left no heir.
