= East Malling railway station =

Railway station in Kent, England

Coordinates: 51.286°N 0.439°E

East Malling
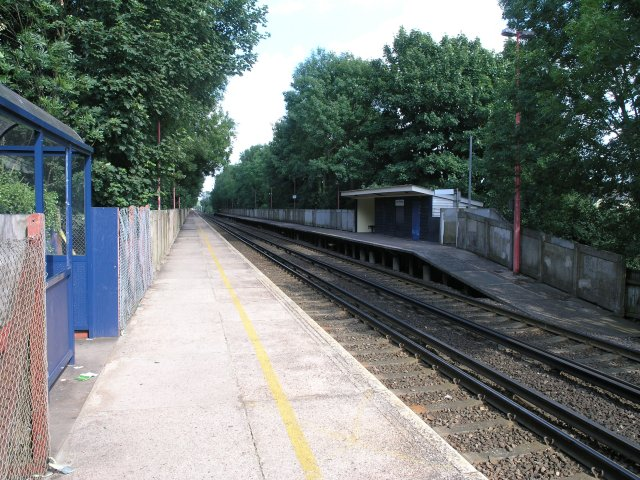

General information
- Location: East Malling, Tonbridge and Malling; England
- Grid reference: TQ702568
- Managed by: Southeastern
- Platforms: 2

Other information
- Station code: EML
- Classification: DfT category F2

History
- Opened: 1 April 1913

Passengers
- 2020/21: ▼19,996
- 2021/22: ▲57,882
- 2022/23: ▲65,546
- 2023/24: ▲77,840
- 2024/25: ▲93,032
Location
Notes
- Passenger statistics from the Office of Rail and Road

East Malling railway station serves the village of East Malling in Kent, and is close to Ditton and Larkfield. It is 35 miles 64 chains (57.6 km) down the line from London Victoria.

The station, and most trains serving it, are operated by Southeastern.

== History ==
East Malling Halt opened in 1913. The station is at high level, adjacent to the railway bridge over the High Street, and the platforms are accessed by steps from street level: there are no lifts. Originally built of sleepers, the halt was rebuilt in concrete in the late 1950s. About a mile (1.6 km) east of the station, a siding served a small quarry in the 1930s. Further east still, were the two Preston Hall Tunnels, of 33 yards (30 m) and 54 yards (49 m) length. These had been removed by 1995.

The ticket office here closed by 1988; it was located in a wooden building on the up (London-bound) platform, where the part retained as a shelter continues in use. A PERTIS 'permit to travel' machine, located at road level at the foot of the steep staircase to the up platform, suffices. There is a metal shelter on the down platform, where extensive underpinning of the concrete platform took place in 2006. The platforms were extended in the late 1980s to take 8-car trains, having previously been of 6-car length only.

== Services ==
All services at East Malling are operated by Southeastern using Class 375 and 377 EMUs.

The typical off-peak service in trains per hour is:

- 1 tph to London Victoria
- 1 tph to Ashford International

During the peak hours, the station is served by an additional hourly service between London Victoria and Ashford International, increasing the service to 2 tph in each direction.

Preceding station	National Rail	Following station
West Malling	Southeastern Kent Downs line	Barming
