= Sir Roger Twisden, 2nd Baronet =

English politician

Sir Roger Twisden, 2nd Baronet (12 October 1640 – 28 February 1703) was an English politician who sat in the House of Commons from 1689 to 1690.

Twisden was the son of Sir Thomas Twisden, 1st Baronet and his wife Jane Tomlinson, daughter of John Tomlinson. Twisden succeeded to the baronetcy of Bradbourne, Kent on the death of his father on 2 January 1683.

Twisden was elected Member of Parliament (MP) for Rochester in 1689 and held the seat until 1690.

Twisden married Margaret Marsham, daughter of Sir John Marsham in 1667.

Twisden lived at Bradbourne, Kent and died suddenly aged 62 on 28 February 1703.

== Sir Roger Twisden, 6th Baronet ==
Sir Roger Twisden, 6th Bt. was born on 7 November 1737. He was the son of Sir Roger Twisden, 5th Bt. and Elizabeth Watton. He married Rebecca Wildash, daughter of Isaac Wildash and Rebecca Tyhurst, on 25 January 1779. He died on 5 October 1779 at age 41, without male heir. He graduated from Oxford University, Oxford, Oxfordshire, on 5 July 1759 with a Master of Arts (M.A.). He succeeded to the title of 6th Baronet Twisden, of Bradbourne, Kent on 7 March 1772. Rebecca (his widow) became the owner of the Manor of 'Herst Hall' in Murston.

Parliament of England
Preceded by Sir John Banks; Francis Clerke	Member of Parliament for Rochester; 1689–1690; With: Sir John Banks	Succeeded by Sir Joseph Williamson; Francis Clerke
Baronetage of England
Preceded by Thomas Twisden	Baronet of Bradbourne; 1683–1703	Succeeded by Thomas Twisden
