= Nicholas Saunders (died 1649) =

English landowner and Member of Parliament

- Born: 1563
- Died: 9 February 1649 (aged 85–86)
- Occupation: politician
- Known for: English Member of Parliament
- Children: Isabella Twysden

Sir Nicholas Saunders (1563 – 9 February 1649) was an English landowner and member of parliament. He was a Catholic but became a member of the Church of England and parliament. He had to sell property due to financial problems. His later life is known in some detail due to the extant diary of his daughter Isabella Twysden.

== Life ==
He was the eldest son of Nicholas Saunders of Ewell, Surrey and his first wife, Isabel Carew, daughter of Sir Nicholas Carew (executed for treason in 1539) and Elizabeth Bryan, and was educated at Balliol College, Oxford and the Inner Temple (1583). He spent part of his childhood in the household of William Cecil, 1st Baron Burghley, who remained his friend.

He succeeded his father in 1587 and was knighted in 1603. In his early adult life, he was, like his father and his wife, an ardent Roman Catholic and was presented as a recusant in 1585/86, although, possibly due to Burghley's friendship, he did not suffer any penalty. After his father's death, he conformed to the Church of England, and even sat on a commission for the suppression of Jesuits in 1591/92. His wife remained an open Catholic, which caused the sincerity of his own Protestantism to be questioned from time to time. He took part in the Capture of Cádiz in 1596, but suffered the embarrassment of being arrested for debt on the way.

Saunders was a Member of Parliament for Haslemere in 1593, Gatton in 1604 and Winchelsea in 1626. In the Blessed Parliament of 1604-11 he was an active and diligent committee man.

He was in financial difficulties for much of his adult life: he sold three manors between 1591 and 1601, and in 1638 sold Ewell itself. He blamed the "ill-dealing of others" for his troubles, but his involvement in impractical money-making schemes, such as one to supply London with drinking water, was at least partly to blame. He is not known to have taken any part in the English Civil War. He died intestate, and reputedly penniless, at Nonesuch Palace, where he had lived since selling nearby Ewell, on 9 February 1649, and was buried by torchlight in the same grave as his wife.

He married Elizabeth, the daughter and heiress of Richard Blount of London and Williton, Somerset, (her mother Margaret Blount was his stepmother), with whom he had a son, Henry and three daughters, including Isabella, who married Sir Roger Twysden, 2nd Baronet. Elizabeth brought him a comfortable fortune, which he seems to have run through. Isabella "a lady of rare patience and prudence" kept a diary of the period 1645–51 in which she describes her father's last days.
