= Twysden baronets =

Extinct baronetcy in the Baronetage of England

There have been two baronetcies created, both in the Baronetage of England, for members of the Twysden (or Twisden) family of Kent.

The Baronetcy of Twysden of Roydon Hall, Kent, was created on 29 June 1611 for William Twysden of Roydon Hall, East Peckham, Kent, the son of Roger Twysden, High Sheriff of Kent in 1599, and grandson of William Twysden of Chelmington and Wye who married Elizabeth Whetenhall, heiress of Roydon in 1542. Between 1593 and 1614 he served as Member of Parliament for Clitheroe, Helston, Thetford, and Winchelsea. His son and heir, Roger the second Baronet, was an ardent supporter of Charles I which caused him great problems during the Commonwealth of England. Both he and his son, William, the third Baronet served in Parliament. The Baronetcy was extinct on the death of the twelfth Baronet in 1970.

The Baronetcy of Twisden of Bradbourne, Kent, was created for Sir Thomas Twisden, Kt., of Bradbourne House, East Malling, Kent, on 13 June 1666. He was the second son of Sir William Twysden, 1st Baronet of Roydon and brother of the unfortunate Sir Roger Twysden. He changed the spelling of his surname to Twisden. He was a lawyer, Serjeant at Law, and a High Court judge who presided at the trial of regicides. He was Recorder of Maidstone and represented Maidstone in Parliament 1647–8. He purchased the manor of Bradbourne in 1656. The second and third Baronets respectively represented, Rochester and Kent. The fourth Baronet rebuilt Bradbourne House in the early 18th century. His brother the sixth Baronet also represented Kent. On the death of the sixth Baronet, his next elder brother William was excluded from the succession in favour of his younger brother John Papillon Twisden who claimed to be the seventh Baronet and was succeeded by his son as eighth Baronet. On his death, a legal dispute arose as to the succession, settled in favour of Captain John Twisden, son of the disinherited William. His son John Francis was reinstated as de jure seventh Baronet. The baronetcy was briefly in abeyance following the death in 1907 of the tenth Baronet without issue. The title was revived in 1909 for his uncle John Francis the eleventh Baronet. The baronetcy became extinct on the death of his son in 1937.

== Twysden of Roydon, Kent (1611) ==
Escutcheon of the Twysden baronets of Roydon

- Sir William Twysden, 1st Baronet (1566–1629)
- Sir Roger Twysden, 2nd Baronet (1597–1672)
- Sir William Twysden, 3rd Baronet (1635–1697)
- Sir Thomas Twysden, 4th Baronet (1676–1712)
- Sir William Twysden, 5th Baronet (1677–1751); through his son the Rt. Rev. Philip Twysden, they are ancestors of Diana, Princess of Wales, and of her sons, Princes William, the Prince of Wales, and Harry, Duke of Sussex.
- Sir William Twysden, 6th Baronet (1707–1767)
- Sir William Jervis Twysden, 7th Baronet (1760–1834)
- Sir William Twysden, 8th Baronet (1788–1879)
- Sir Louis John Francis Twysden, 9th Baronet (1831–1911)
- Sir Roger Twysden, 10th Baronet (1894–1934)
- Sir Anthony Roger Twysden, 11th Baronet (1918–1946)
- Sir William Adam Duncan Twysden, 12th Baronet (1897–1970)

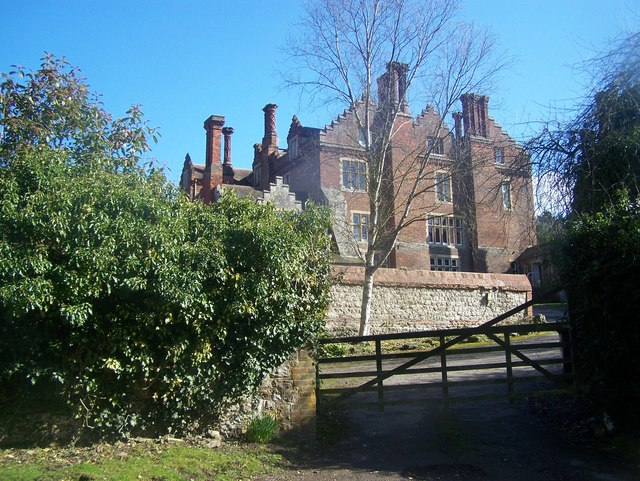
Roydon Hall, Kent

== Twisden of Bradbourne (1666) ==
- Sir Thomas Twisden, 1st Baronet (1602–1683)
- Sir Roger Twisden, 2nd Baronet (1640–1703)
- Sir Thomas Twisden, 3rd Baronet (1668–1728)
- Sir Thomas Twisden, 4th Baronet (1704–1737)
- Sir Roger Twisden, 5th Baronet (1705–1772)
- Sir Roger Twisden, 6th Baronet (1737–1779)
- Sir John Papillon Twisden, 7th Baronet (1743–1810)
- Sir John Twisden, 8th Baronet (1784–1841)
- Sir John Francis Twisden, 7th Baronet de jure (1767–1853)
- Sir John Kerr Twisden, 8th Baronet de jure (1819–1862)
- Sir William Twisden, 9th Baronet (1818–1883)
- Sir Roger John Twisden, 10th Baronet (1852–1907) in abeyance
- Sir Rev John Francis Twisden, 11th Baronet (1825–1914)
- Sir John Ramskill Twisden, 12th Baronet (1856–1937)

Baronetage of England
Preceded by Sedley baronets	Twysden baronets 29 June 1611	Succeeded by Hales baronets
