= Francis Clerke (politician, died 1686) =

English lawyer and politician

Sir Francis Clerke (c. 1624 – 25 February 1686) was an English lawyer and politician who sat in the House of Commons between 1661 and 1685.

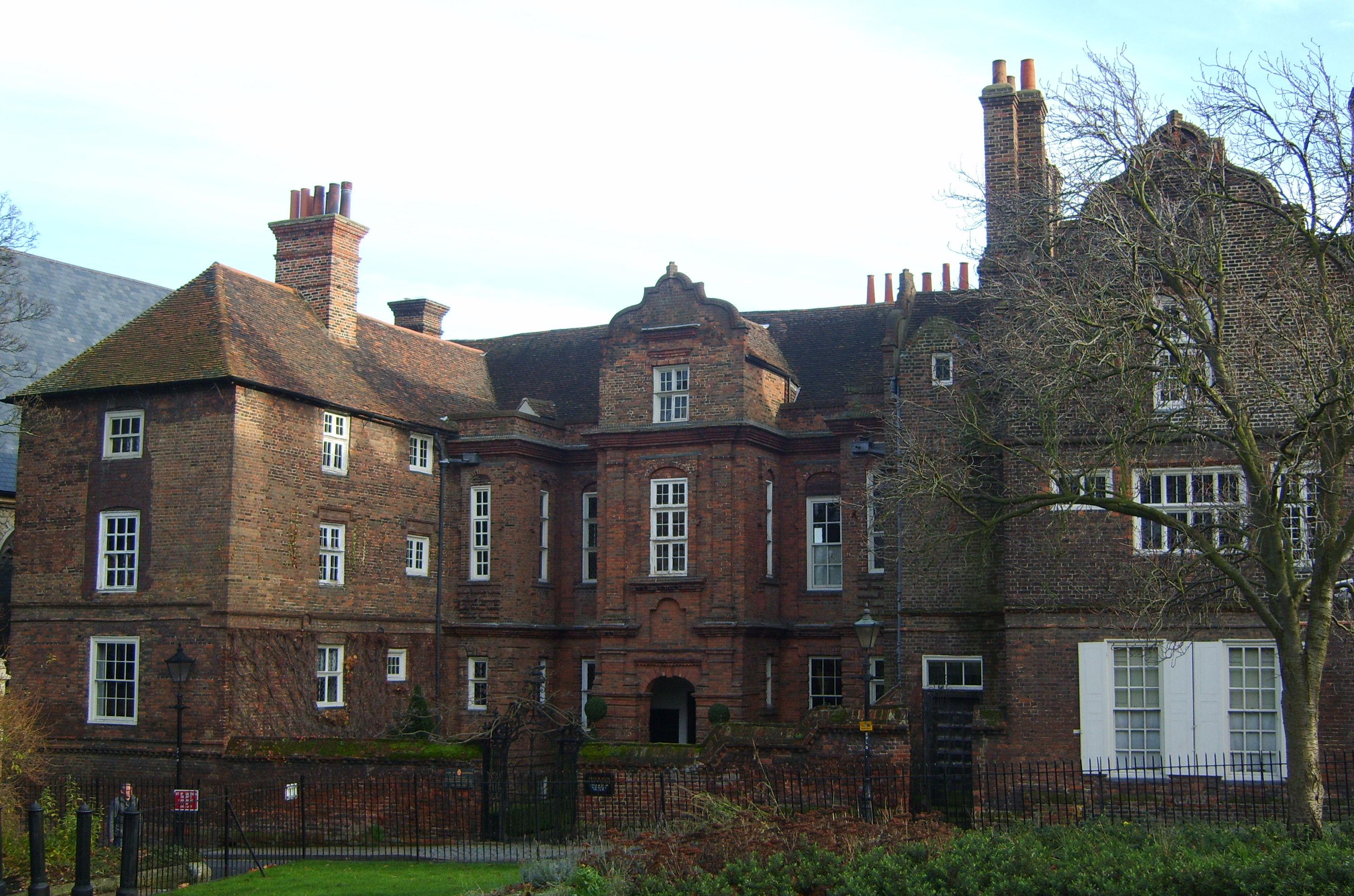
Restoration House.

Clerke was the son of Henry Clerke of Rochester, who was a lawyer and MP for Rochester. Clerke inherited his father's property which included Restoration House at Rochester. During the English Civil War, the house had been sequestered and occupied by Colonel Gibbon, Cromwell's commander in South East England. When King Charles II returned to London in 1660, Rochester was an important stopping place on the way, and Restoration House was fitted out to provide an overnight base for the King and his family.

Clerke was elected Member of Parliament (MP) for Rochester in 1661 for the Cavalier Parliament until 1679. He was re-elected in 1681 and held the seat to 1685.

Clerke resided at Ulcombe-place, and died in 1685. His son Francis was also MP for Rochester.

Parliament of England
Preceded by Peter Pett; John Marsham	Member of Parliament for Rochester; 1661–1679; With: Sir William Batten; Sir Richard Head	Succeeded by Sir Richard Head; Sir John Banks
Preceded by Sir John Banks; Francis Barrell	Member of Parliament for Rochester; 1681–1685; With: Sir John Banks	Succeeded by Sir John Banks; Sir Roger Twisden
