= Sir Thomas Twisden, 3rd Baronet =

British Tory Member of Parliament and lawyer

Sir Thomas Twisden, 3rd Baronet (10 November 1668 – 12 September 1728) was a British Tory Member of Parliament and lawyer.

Twisden went to the Inner Temple. He was a Member of Parliament (MP) for Kent from 1722 to 1727.

He died aged 59.

Parliament of Great Britain
Preceded by Hon. John Fane; William Delaune	Member of Parliament for Kent; 1722–1727; With: Sir Edward Knatchbull, Bt	Succeeded by Sir Roger Meredith, Bt; Sir Robert Furnese, Bt
Baronetage of England
Preceded by Roger Twisden	Baronet (of Bradbourn); 1703–1728	Succeeded by Thomas Twisden
