= Roger Twysden =

English historian and politician

Sir Roger Twysden, 2nd Baronet (21 August 1597 – 27 June 1672), of Roydon Hall near East Peckham in Kent, was an English historian and politician who sat in the House of Commons at various times between 1625 and 1640.

== Life ==
Twysden was the son of Sir William Twysden, 1st Baronet and his wife Anne Finch, daughter of Sir Moyle Finch, 1st Baronet and Elizabeth Finch, 1st Countess of Winchilsea. His father was a courtier and scholar who shared in some of the voyages against Spain in the reign of Queen Elizabeth I and was well known at the court of King James I, becoming one of the first baronets. His mother was a writer. Twysden was educated at St Paul's School and was admitted to Emmanuel College, Cambridge on 8 November 1614. He entered Gray's Inn on 2 February 1623. For some years, he remained on his estate at Roydon Hall, East Peckham, largely engaged in building and planting, but also in studying antiquities and the law of the constitution. He also had some interest in natural history.

In 1625, Twysden was elected Member of Parliament for Winchelsea. He was re-elected MP for Winchelsea in 1626. As the eldest son, he succeeded to the baronetcy on the death of his father on 8 January 1629. Twysden arranged for his mother's writings to be published.

Twysden showed his determination to stand for his rights by refusing to pay ship money. In April 1640 he was elected MP for Kent in the Short Parliament. However, he became disillusioned and was not a member of the Long Parliament elected later the same year. He applauded the early measures of the parliament to restrict the king's prerogative but became alarmed when it went on to assail the Church. The attainder of Lord Strafford frightened him as a tyrannical use of power, and he became a typical example of the men who formed the strength of the king's party in the English Civil War. He considered himself too old to serve in the field and therefore he did not join the king at Oxford.

In 1642, he was arrested after signing a petition from Kent and, once he was released on bail, he published the seditious Instructions. He was caught while trying to flee the country and was imprisoned again. In 1643 his estates were sequestrated. After the execution of the King, he returned to Kent, but his respect for legality would not let him rest, and he was soon in trouble again for another demonstration known as "The Instruction to Mr Augustine Skinner." For this, he was again arrested and for a time confined in a public house, called "The Two Tobacco Pipes," near Charing Cross, London. He was released with a distinct intimation that he would be well advised not to go back to Roydon Hall, but to keep out of temptation in London. He took the advice and applied himself to reading. One plan for going abroad was given up, but at last, he endeavoured to escape in disguise, was detected, and was brought back to London. He was now subjected to all the vexations inflicted on Royalist partisans of good property: sequestrations of his rents, fines for "malignancy," and confinement in the Tower of London, where he consoled himself with his books. At last, he reached a settlement in 1650 and went home, where he lived quietly till the Restoration, when he resumed his position as magistrate and was made Deputy Lieutenant of the county. He was never fully reconciled to the Court or government.

Twysden died on 27 June 1672 and was buried at Peckham. Memorials to the Twysden family are to be found in St Michael's church, East Peckham.

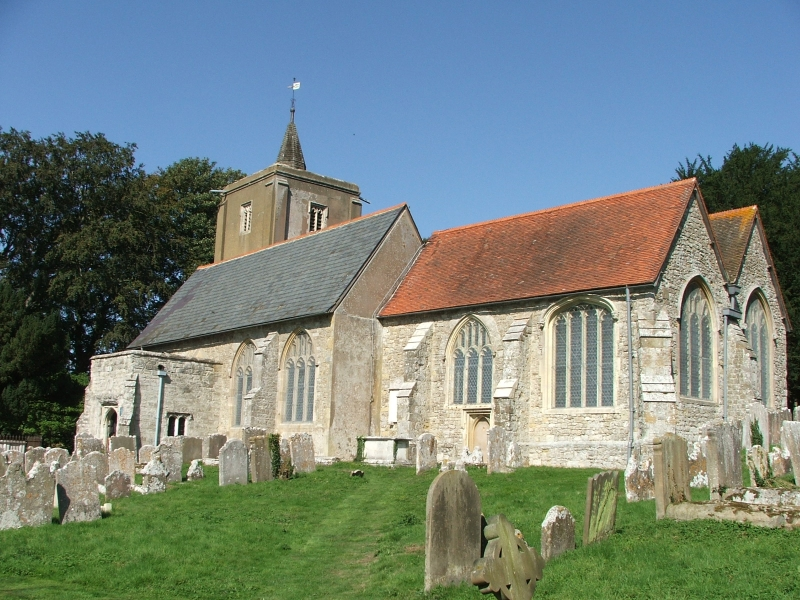
St. Michael's Church, East Peckham, Kent, which contains memorials to several members of the Twysden family

== Works ==
Twysden's claim to notice rests on three works:

- The Commoners Liberty (1648);
- Historiae Anglicanae Scriptores X (1652), a pioneering work of English medieval history; and
- An Historical Vindication of the Church of England (1657).

The Scriptores Decem were ten chroniclers, namely: Simeon Monachus Dunelmensis, Johannes Prior Hagustaldensis, Ricardus Prior Hagustaldensis, Ailredus Abbas Rievallensis, Radulphus de Diceto Londoniensis, Johannes Brompton Jornallensis, Gervasius Monachus Dorobornensis, Thomas Stubbs Dominicanus, Gulielmus Thorn Cantuariensis, Henricus Knighton Leicestrensis.

== Family ==
Twysden married Isabella Saunders, diarist and his mother's lady-in-waiting. Isabella was the daughter of Sir Nicholas Saunders of Ewell and Elizabeth Blount. Her father was a political figure of some importance, but his career was hampered by his wife's open adherence to the Roman Catholic faith, and his own chronic money troubles: by some reports he was almost penniless at his death in 1649. Isabella was described as "a lady of rare patience and prudence" in bearing the troubles of life, and assisting her husband in his imprisonment. She died in March 1657. Their son, Sir William, 3rd Baronet (1635–1697), succeeded to the baronetcy on Twysden's death. He had a son named Sir William Twysden, 5th Baronet (1677–1751), who was the grandfather of Frances Twysden.

== Sources ==
- Leigh Rayment's list of baronets
- Twysden genealogy

Parliament of England
Preceded by John Finch; Edward Nicholas	Member of Parliament for Winchelsea; 1625–1626	Succeeded by William Twysden; Sir Ralph Freeman
Vacant Parliament suspended since 1629	Member of Parliament for Kent; 1640; With: Norton Knatchbull	Succeeded by Sir John Colepeper; Sir Edward Dering
Baronetage of England
Preceded by William Twysden	Baronet (of Roydon Hall); 1629–1672	Succeeded by William Twysden
