= Whetham =

Whetham is a surname. Notable people with the surname include:

- Adelaide Boddam-Whetham (1860–1954), British archer
- John Boddam-Whetham (1843–1918), English naturalist and cricketer
- Arthur Whetham (died 1853), British Army officer
- Charles Whetham (1812–1885), British politician and businessman
- David Whetham, British academic
- John Whetham (died 1796), Irish religious figure
- Nathaniel Whetham (1604–1668), English baker and politician
- Thomas Whetham (died 1741), British soldier and politician
- William Cecil Dampier Whetham (1867–1952), British agriculturalist and science historian
- Margaret Anderson (indexer) (born Margaret Dampier Whetham, 1900–1997), British biochemist, daughter of William Cecil Dampier Whetham
- Edith Holt Whetham (1911–2001), English agricultural economist, daughter of William Cecil Dampier Whetham

== See also ==
- Whetham, Wiltshire
