= St Mary's Church, Hadlow =

St Mary's, Hadlow
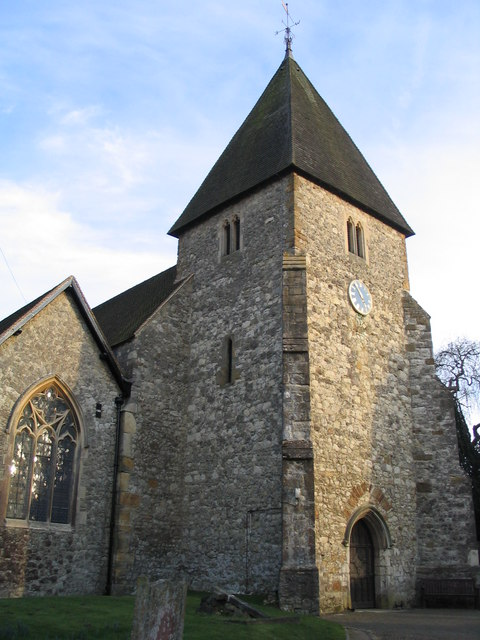
- St Mary's, Hadlow

- St Mary's, Hadlow
- 51°13′24″N 0°20′22″E
- OS grid reference: TQ 6343 4971
- Location: Hadlow, Kent
- Country: England
- Denomination: Church of England
- Churchmanship: Liberal Catholic
- Website: www.stmaryshadlow.org.uk

History
- Status: Church
- Founded: 975
- Dedication: St Mary

Architecture
- Functional status: Active
- Heritage designation: Grade II* listed
- Designated: 20 October 1954
- Architectural type: Church
- Style: Early English; Decorated

Administration
- Province: Canterbury
- Diocese: Rochester
- Archdeaconry: Tonbridge
- Deanery: Paddock Wood
- Parish: Hadlow

Clergy
- Vicar: The Revd Jim Horton

St Mary's Church is the parish church in Hadlow, Kent, United Kingdom. The church is a Grade II* listed building.

== History ==
The first record of a church in Hadlow was in 975. This church would probably have been a wooden building. In 1018, the early church was replaced by a building of stone. In the 12th century, the church was rebuilt and extended by Richard de Clare, then lord of the Manor of Hadlow. De Clare granted the church to the Knights Hospitallers in 1166. The Knights Hospitallers later had a preceptory at nearby West Peckham, which was their local administrative base. From the Norman Conquest until the 18th century, Hadlow did not have a resident Lord of the Manor, being held under Tonbridge Castle. It is thought that the tower was raised and the spire added in the 15th century. Little money was spent on the maintenance of the church, although some 15th- and 16th-century bequests are recorded. Thomas Walter, Yeoman bequeathed 20s in 1448 "To make a window on the north side of the church by the altar of Our Lady". John Tatlyngbery bequeathed 10 marks "For repair of the great door of the church". In 1456, Richard Bealde bequeathed 13s 4d "For repair of the tower of Hadlow church". In 1461, Dionysia Ippenbury left 3d for masses to be said each year for 12 years. In 1465, William Palle, yeoman left a cow to the church. It was to be sold and "the profits therefrom to be devoted to the maintenance of a lamp in the chancel." In 1509, Thomas Fisher, yeoman bequeathed £20 "for making a new rood loft". The rood screen may not have been in existence long, although it was mentioned in bequests dated 1510 and 1513. The church remained under the ownership of the Knights Hospitallers until 1540, when the order was dissolved by Henry VIII. In 1533, Henry Fane left two chalices valued at £4.

The west door is inscribed "WB 1637 ES". The tower and steeple were repaired in that year. The churchwardens were Walter Barton and Essau Simmons. In 1791, the clock was installed in the tower. It was made by John Thwaites of Clerkenwell. At the beginning of the 19th century, the church was in disrepair. In 1847, the chancel was rebuilt and the vestry added. In 1853, the south porch was blocked up. The north aisle was added in this year at a cost of £470, which was raised by public subscription. A private gallery was erected by Walter Barton May, owner of Hadlow Castle. This had its own private access and was located at the west end of the nave. In 1885, an altar reredos was erected to the memory of Sir William Yardley and his wife Amelia. Yardley was a former judge in the High Court of Bombay, India. In 1936, the gallery was removed. Work on the doorway at the west of the church in 1936 exposed some small crosses carved in the stonework. These are attributed to Nicholas de Hadloe and his son, who lived at Hadlow Place. They were carved to commemorate their safe return from the Third Crusade in 1189. St Mary's was listed on 20 October 1954. It is currently Grade II* listed.

== Construction ==
St Mary's is mostly constructed from ragstone, with some ashlar detail and quoins of Tunbridge Wells sandstone. The church is built in the Early English and Decorated style. The chancel roof is of slate, while the nave and aisle roofs are tiled. The spire is covered in shingles. The stained glass windows date from the 19th and 20th centuries, the most recent of which is "The Visitation" created by Francis Skeat in 1956.

== The Coverdale Chair ==
In 1919, the Coverdale Chair was presented to St Mary's by T E Foster MacGeagh of Hadlow Castle. The chair is so-named because it was owned by Miles Coverdale, Bishop of Exeter, who made the first translation of the Bible into English. In 1954, the chair was transferred to Rochester Cathedral, but it was returned to St Mary's in 1967.

== Bells ==
St Mary's has a ring of eight bells, hung for change ringing. The treble and 2nd were inscribed "Pack & Chapman of London Fecit 1775". They were recast in 1994 by the Whitechapel Bell Foundry, London. At this time, the third was welded and the frame renewed. The third is inscribed "Iames Bartlett Me Fecit 1696". The fourth, fifth, sixth and seventh are inscribed "Iames Bartlett Me Fecit 1695", and the tenor is inscribed "Henry Barton Edmond Norman Ch Wardens Andrew Reany Vicar 1695 Iames Bartlett Me Fecit".

== Organ ==
The organ at the church was presented as a gift by Ernest Hargreaves (who married the then vicar's daughter) and was built by Alfred Monk of Camden in 1880. It has a brass plate that includes a quotation from verse 6 of Psalm 150:

Presented to St Mary's Church, Hadlow
THROUGH
THE REV^{D} PHILLIP HOWARD MONEYPENNY,
Vicar of the Parish,
BY
ERNEST HARGREAVES ESQ^{R}
August 1880.
Let everything that has breath praise the Lord.

It has 35 speaking stops on three manuals and pedal including principal stops, reed stops, flute stops, string stops and a 32 ft (9.8 m) contrabass stop.

The organ underwent major restoration in 1975 that was carried out by Hill, Norman and Beard. Prior to the restoration, it was suggested that the instrument should be replaced by an electric or electronic organ; this advice was not followed.

The Victorian background of the organ is clearly displayed by the (later added) chamber surrounding it. The instrument is one of the largest village church organs in the south-east.

=== Organ specification ===
Great	Swell	Choir	Pedal
Clarion 4	Vox humana 8	Clarionet 8	Violoncello 8
Cornopean 8	Clarion 4	Piccolo 2	Quint 10 2/3
Sesquialtra (17.19.22)	Oboe 8	Wald flute 4	Bourdon 16
Fifteenth 2	Trombone 8	Gemshorn 4	Open diapason 16
Twelfth 3	Mixture (15.19.22)	Viol d'amour 8	Contra bass 32
Principal 4	Fifteenth 2	Lieblich gedact 8
Harmonic flute 4	Principal 4	Keraulophon 8
Gamba 8	Voix celeste 8
Clarabella 8	Dulciana 8
Open diapason 8	Gedact 8
Double open diapason 16	Open diapason 8
	Bourdon 16
	Tremulant
Swell to Great	Choir to Great
Choir to Pedals	Great to Pedals	Swell to Pedals

3 composition pedals each to Great and Swell; balanced swell pedal.

== Memorials ==
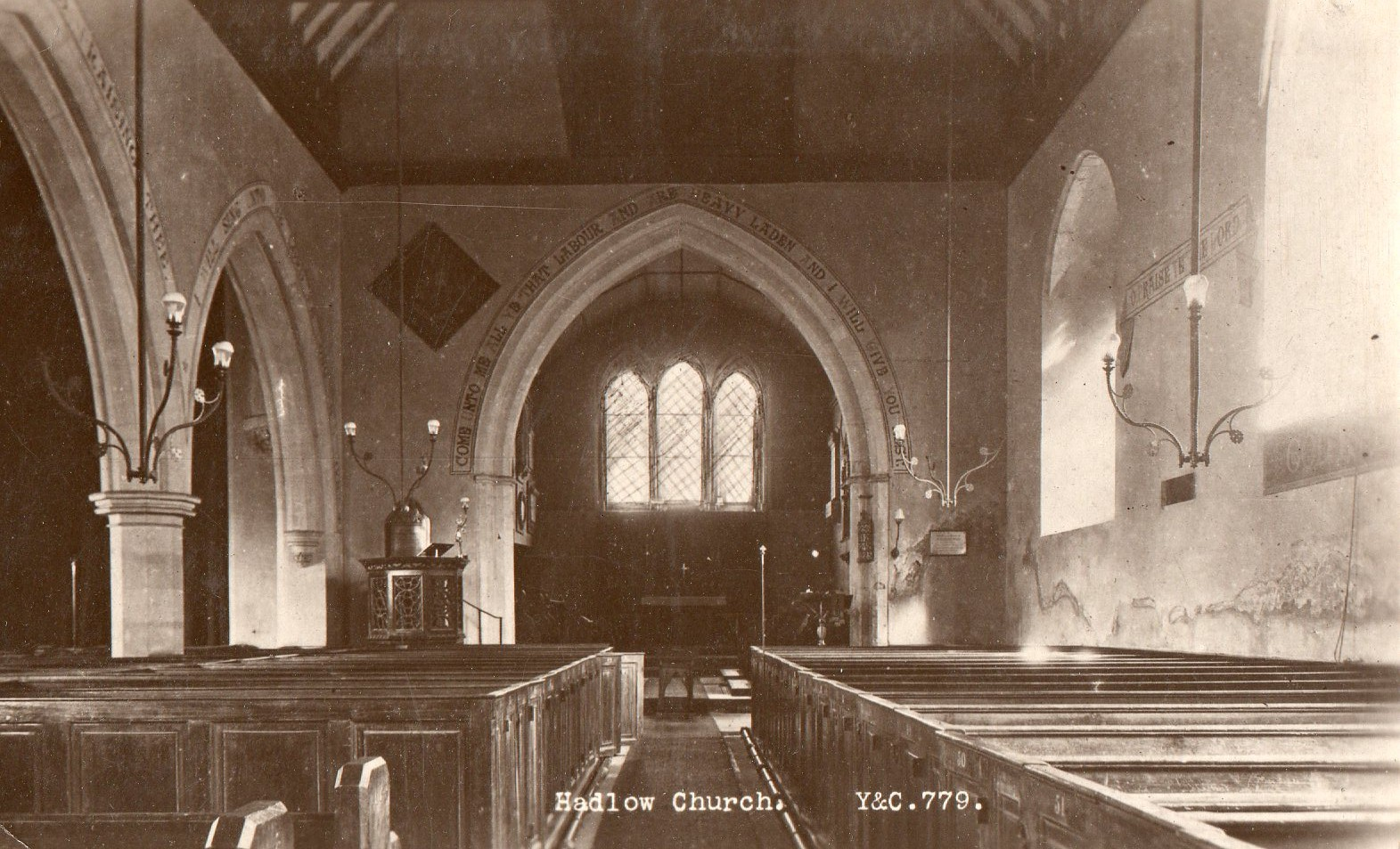
Interior, c. 1920

Many memorials in St Mary's were destroyed in the rebuilding of the church between 1847 and 1853. A brass commemorating John Stoke, vicar (d. 1370) was in existence in 1900, but has since disappeared. Other memorials were to Sir Ralph Colcoff, vicar (d. 1514) and Dame Elizabeth Gossand, wife of Henry Fane.

Surviving memorials are to Thomas Barton of Goldhill (d. 1662) and Thomas May (d. 1714), both ancestors of the builders of Hadlow Castle. Several tablets in St Mary's are to various members of the Moneypenny family. Four generations of this family served as vicars between 1797 and 1952. There is a memorial to Sir John Rivers, former Lord Mayor and Sheriff of London, who was a lay rector at St Mary's, and his wife Joan. Rivers died in 1584, his wife in 1618.

In the churchyard, there is a memorial in the shape of an oast house to 30 hop-pickers who were killed in the Hartlake disaster, an accident that occurred while a wagon, taking around 40 hop-pickers and their families back to their camp site, was crossing the flood-swollen River Medway at the poorly maintained Hartlake Bridge on 20 October 1853. The monument is a Grade II listed building.

== See also ==
- List of places of worship in Tonbridge and Malling

== Sources ==
- Dumbreck, William Vincent (1968). A short history of St Mary's, Hadlow. Hadlow: St Mary's Church.
- Thirsk, Joan (2007). Hadlow, Life, Land & People in a Wealden Parish. Canterbury: Kent Archaeological Society. ISBN 978-0-906746-70-7.
