= Hartlake disaster =

Coordinates: 51°12′05″N 0°19′51″E

The Hartlake disaster was an accident in Kent, England, that resulted in the death of 30 hop-pickers on 20 October 1853.

== Accident ==
The Hartlake bridge is a bridge over the River Medway in Golden Green of the parish of Hadlow, Kent. On the evening of 20 October 1853, a wagon was taking around 40 hop-pickers and their families back to their camp site. One of the horses pulling the wagon shied on the bridge, causing one of its wheels to crash through the side of the bridge. This upended the cart, tipping its passengers into the river, which at the time was swollen in flood.

The victims were casual workers and either Irish or Romani people. The Romanis were all from one extended family. The victims were aged between 2 and 59 years old.

== Inquest ==
The inquest into the deaths was held at the Bell Inn by "D N Dudlow Esq" and returned a verdict of accidental death. The coroner found that "the accident arose entirely from the defective state of the road and the wooden bridge, and their dangerous construction, which ought to have been before remedied". The maintenance of the bridge had been the responsibility of the Medway Navigation Company.

== Memorial ==
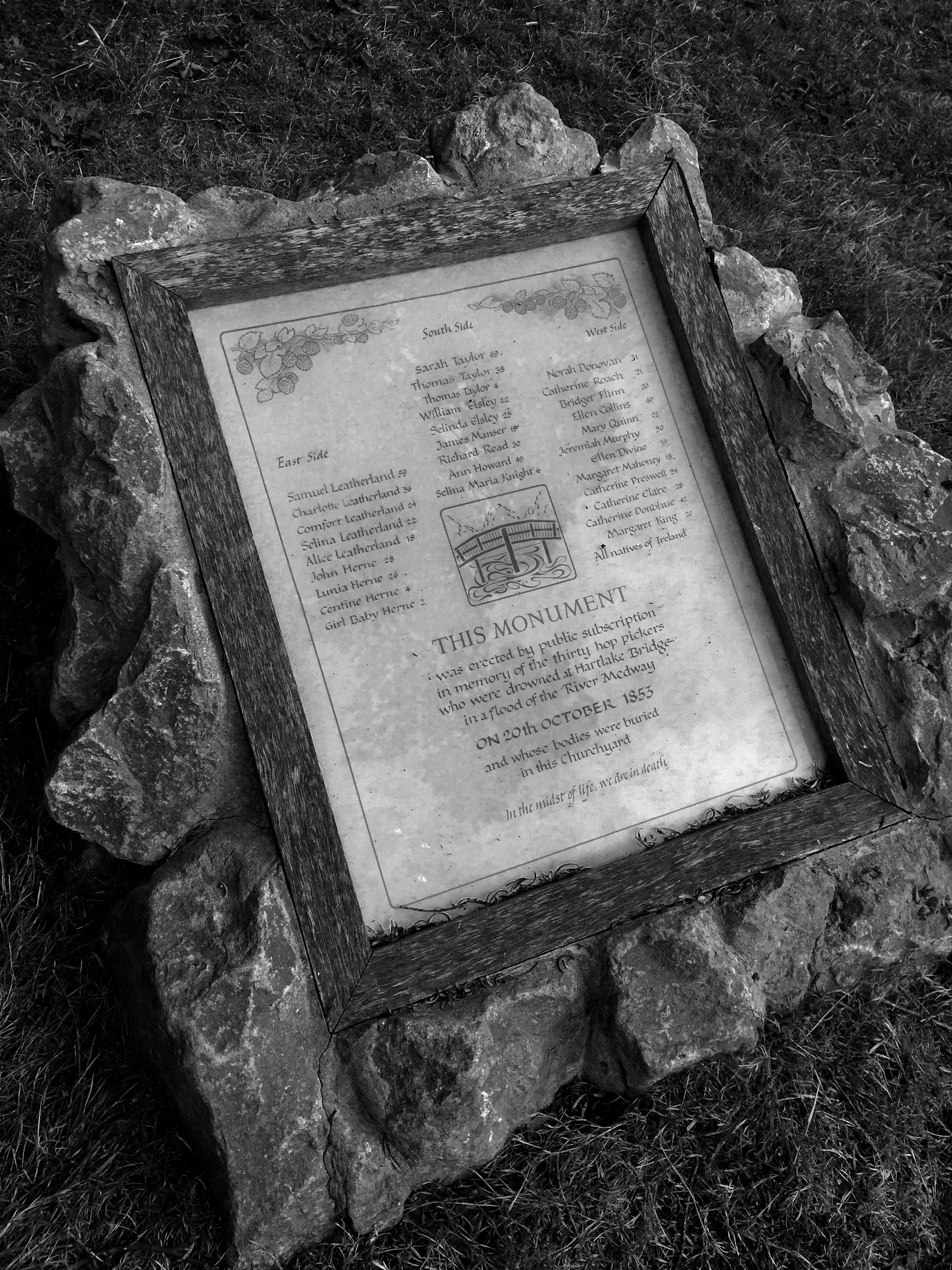
Plaque listing the names of the victims of the Hartlake disaster in the grounds of St Mary's Church, Hadlow.

The deceased were buried in the nearby St Mary's Church, where a monument in the form of an oast house has been erected. The monument is Grade II listed. The full cost of the burial was borne by the parish of Hadlow, the Medway Navigation Company refusing to contribute. In October 2013, on the 160th anniversary of the disaster, a new plaque carrying the names of the dead was added to the by now weathered memorial. The name of the youngest victim, a two-year-old girl, remains unknown as her parents died with her in the accident.

The disaster was recorded in a folk song, recorded in the 1970s by Romani Jasper Smith.
