= National College =

National College may refer to:

== India ==
- National College, Bangalore
- National College, Tiruchirapalli, Tamil Nadu, India
- R. D. National College, Mumbai

== Ireland ==
- National College of Ireland

== Mexico ==
- Colegio Nacional (Mexico) (National College)

== Pakistan ==
- Government National College (Karachi)
- National College of Arts, Lahore

== Romania ==
- Category:National Colleges in Romania

== United Kingdom ==
- National College Creative Industries, Essex, England
- National College for Digital Skills, London, England
- National College for Teaching and Leadership, Nottingham, England

== United States ==
- National American University, formerly known as National College
- National College (Virginia)
- National University of Natural Medicine, formerly known as the National College of Natural Medicine
