= Access Creative College =

Academic institution based in England

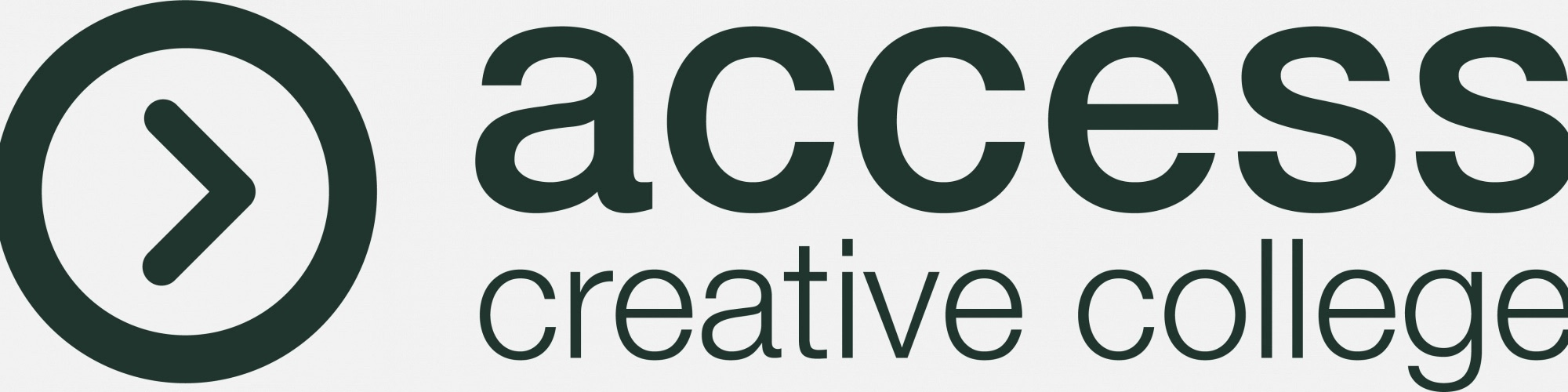
- Type: Further Education
- Established: 1992
- Principal: Birmingham - Zoe Green; Bristol - Jon Domaille; Lincoln - Daniel Swinburne; London - TBC; Manchester - Mark Acton; Norwich - Dan Foden; Plymouth - Matthew Mills
- Location: Birmingham, Bristol, Lincoln, London, Manchester, Norwich, and Plymouth
- Website: www.accesstomusic.co.uk

Access Creative College, formerly Access to Music Ltd, is a UK-based independent training provider which specialises in industry-focused popular music and creative education. It operates across England with dedicated music colleges in Birmingham, Brighton, Bristol, Lincoln, London, Manchester, Norwich, and Plymouth. ACC's head office is in Manchester.

Access Creative College was funded by the Education Funding Authority (EFA) and the Skills Funding Agency (SFA) and worked in partnership with other UK educational institutions, including Birmingham City University (BCU) and the Royal Northern College of Music (RNCM).

== History ==
Access to Music was founded in 1992 by John Ridgeon to promote and improve popular music education in the UK. The first Access to Music head office was in Leicester. The music school formed a partnership with Leicester College followed by partnerships with regional colleges.

The second Access to Music centre opened in Bristol in 1999 and the York and London branches opened in 2002. The first Access to Music award ceremony, hosted by Sir George Martin, took place in London in 2003. Subsequent award ceremonies took place in various locations around the country, including O2 Academy Birmingham and Liverpool Sound City, and have been hosted by BBC Radio DJs Lauren Laverne and Edith Bowman. The music college expanded to Brighton and Lincoln in 2004 with centres opening in both cities.

In 2009, Access to Music was acquired by Armstrong Learning, a Manchester-based education and training provider. In 2011, the head office re-located from Leicester to Birmingham, with an administrative centre established in Manchester. In 2011, Access to Music launched a new centre in Darlington based at The Forum Music Centre which later closed. In 2013, the college in Norwich moved from its King Street location to Epic Studios.

The York centre created and organised Access to Music's first trade fair at York St John University in early April 2014 and Access to Music presented a masterclass at the first Brighton Music Conference, an electronic music event. In the summer of 2014 plans were finalised for a new centre in Manchester, opening in early October. The centre was situated in the basement of the St. James's Buildings on Oxford Street, the former location of the music venues Jilly's Rockworld and Music Box.

In September 2017, Access to Music released its 2018 further education prospectus under a new brand name of Access Creative College. It updated its website shortly afterwards. The name change was introduced to reflect a broader curriculum offer covering the wider creative industries, including games development, digital media, marketing, events and drama.

In February 2020, Access Creative College launched a new joint venture partnership with South Essex College to take over the delivery of apprenticeship training for the creative industries on a national basis, under the National College Creative Industries brand.

On July 25, 2025, Access Creative College (ACC) unexpectedly suspended its Level 1 and Level 2 courses at the Confetti Institute of Creative Technologies, part of Nottingham Trent University. The decision, attributed to a lack of funding on the part of ACC, reportedly left approximately 300 students without access to their planned education. The timing of the announcement was widely criticised by stakeholders at NTU as inappropriate, as it occurred shortly before the start of the academic year, leaving displaced students with limited time to find alternative educational providers.

== Courses and accreditations ==
Access Creative College offers courses in the following pathways: Music, Media, Games, Esports, Computing and Access to HE. The courses at both Further Education (FE) and Higher Education (HE) levels.

The college designed its own FE music curriculum in partnership with Rockschool, the UK's only rock and pop accrediting body and Edexcel. The HE curriculum was designed in conjunction with RNCM and BCU.

ACC run their Higher Education provision in partnership with dBs and NTU

ACC, in partnership with National College for the Creative Industries (NCCI), also offers apprenticeships in creative subjects.

== Notable alumni ==
- Jess Glynne
- Rita Ora, singer-songwriter/actress
- Ed Sheeran
- Vanessa White, singer-songwriter

== Event participation ==
Access Creative College has appeared or participated in the following events:

- Brighton Electric
- Download Festival
- Glastonbury Festival
- Latitude Festival
- Liverpool Sound City
- The Great Escape Festival

== Education partners ==
- Birmingham City University
- Creative & Cultural Skills
- European Social Fund
- NCUK
- PGL (company)
- Royal Northern College of Music
