= Oxonhoath =

Oxonhoath may refer to

- Oxon Hoath, a former manor and Royal Park at West Peckham, Kent.
- Oxonhoath Mill, a watermill on the River Bourne, in the parish of West Peckham.
