= Hadlow Castle =

Folly in Kent, England

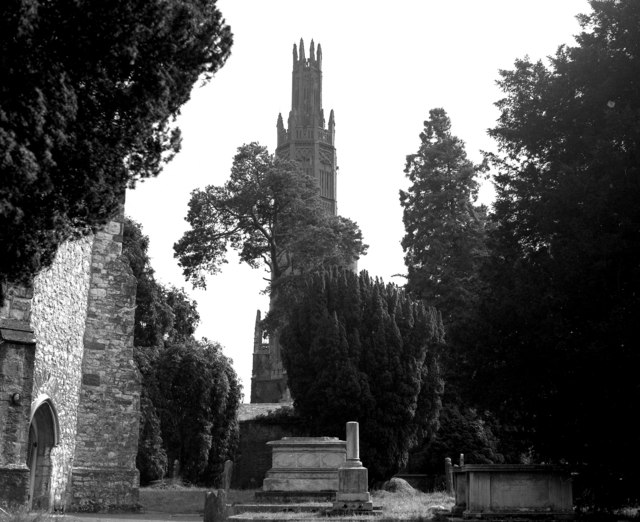
- Hadlow Castle, 1977

- Location within Kent
- Alternative names: May's Folly

General information
- Type: Folly
- Architectural style: Gothic Revival
- Location: Hadlow, United Kingdom
- Coordinates: 51°13′25″N 0°20′20″E
- Construction started: c1785
- Completed: 1852
- Renovated: 2011–13
- Demolished: 1951 (apart from tower and courtyard buildings)

Height
- Height: 53 m (175 ft)

Design and construction
- Architect: George Ledwell Taylor

Hadlow Castle was an 18th-century country house in Hadlow, Kent, England, built in the fashionable Strawberry Hill 'Gothic' style. The house was gradually enlarged and extended during the 19th century and finally demolished in the 20th, apart from a prospect tower and ancillary buildings. The surviving Grade I Listed Hadlow Tower, locally known as May's Folly, was restored in 2013.

== History ==
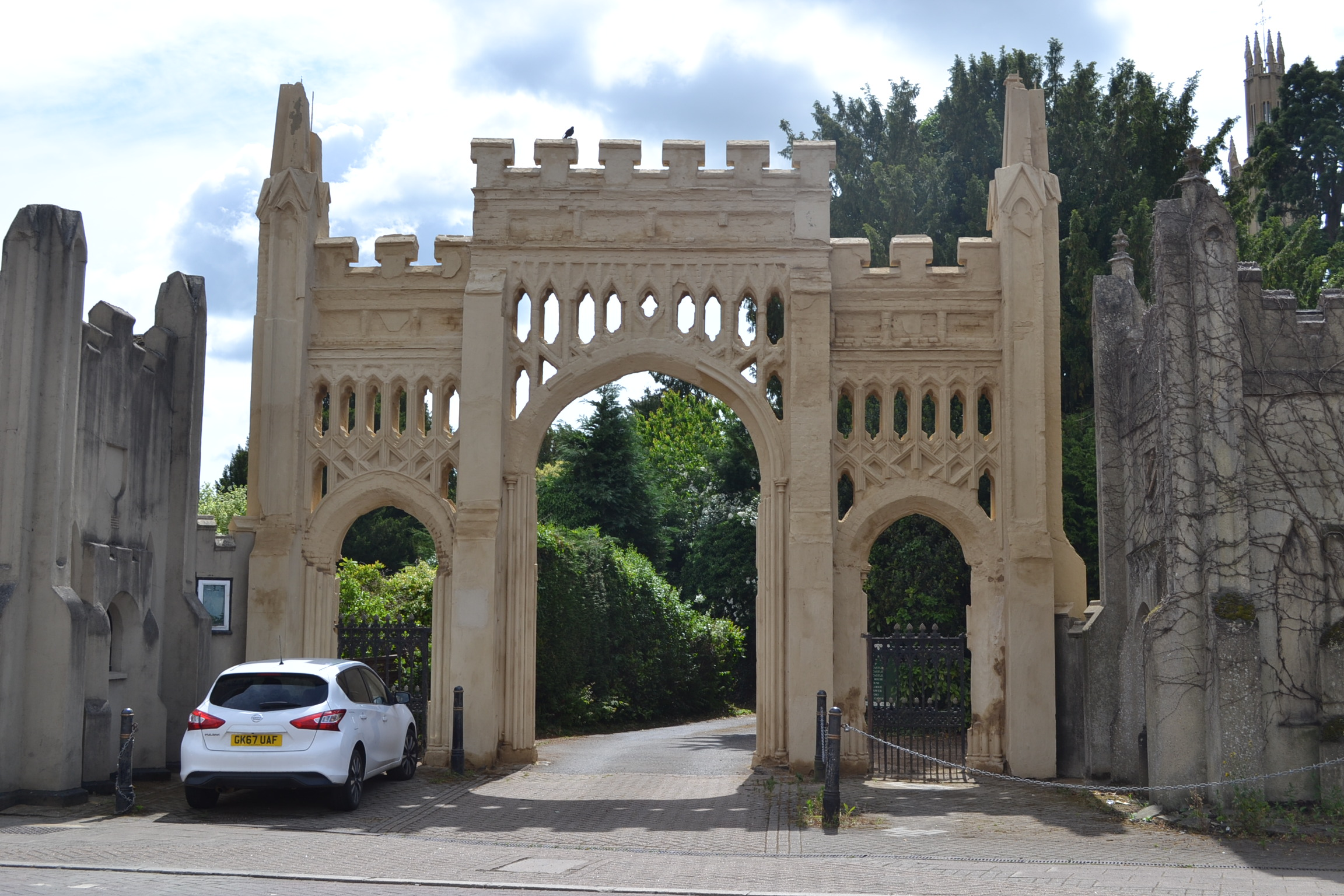
Entrance Arch, High Street, restored in May 2020. 51°13′25″N 0°20′16″E

Hadlow Castle replaced the manor house of Hadlow Court Lodge. It was built over a number of years from the late 1780s, commissioned by Walter May in an ornate Gothic style. The architect was J. Dugdale. His son, Walter Barton May inherited the estate in 1823, and another inheritance in 1832 from his wife's family. He added a 53 m (175 ft) octagonal tower in 1838, the architect was George Ledwell Taylor. A 40 feet (12 m) octagonal lantern was added in 1840 and another smaller tower was added in 1852. This was dismantled in 1905. Walter Barton May died in 1858 and the estate was sold. Subsequent owners were Robert Rodger, JP, High Sheriff of Kent, in 1865. He died in 1882 and his son, Willim Wallace Rodger-Cunliffe died in 1888. In 1900 the castle was sold to Benjamin Scott Foster MacGeagh, a retired trader and entrepreneur. MacGeagh became J.P. in Kent and its High Sheriff and died in 1907. The Castle, its estate and the manors of Hadlow and East Peckham then passed to his son, Dr. Thomas Edwin Foster MacGeagh, a Harley Street practitioner Dr. MacGeagh would drive in his carriage to Tonbridge and catch the train to London thus being an early commuter. However, T.E.F. MacGeagh sold the estate in 1919 to Henry Thomas Pearson, whose farming family occupied it until 1946. During the Second World War it was used as a watchtower by the Home Guard and Royal Observer Corps. The unoccupied castle changed hands several times after the Pearsons left, and was demolished in 1951, except for the servants' quarters, several stables and the Coach House, which were saved by the painter Bernard Hailstone. The Tower was already a Listed Building, having been listed on 17 April 1951. Now the entrance gateway and lodges of the Castle still stand - a heavy Gothic presence on the street - as does the Stable Court with two turreted pavilions, which are all in private ownerships, and new homes have been built in the grounds.

== Tower ==
Hadlow Tower, known locally as May's Folly, is a Victorian Gothic tower, and one of the largest in Britain at 53 m (175 ft). The top 40 feet (12 m) is an octagonal lantern.

The Grade I listed tower was badly damaged in the Great Storm of 1987, and the lantern was removed in 1996. The tower's condition then worsened rapidly. The cost of repairs was estimated at £4 million. In July 2006, Tonbridge and Malling borough council announced that it would issue a compulsory purchase order (CPO) on the tower in an effort to save it. This CPO was confirmed in March 2008 by the Secretary of State for Culture, Media and Sport, with plans for the council to take possession of the Tower and transfer it to the Vivat Trust in late 2009, so that the necessary repair and restoration work can be undertaken; plans included short-term holiday accommodation, with a separate exhibition centre on part of the ground floor.

In January 2011, it was announced that the tower had been compulsorily purchased by Tonbridge and Malling District Council; the council sold it to the Vivat Trust for £1. Restoration of the tower, including the replacement of the lantern commenced in February 2011, with completion then scheduled for September 2012. The project was funded by grants from English Heritage and the Heritage Lottery Fund. The latter granted £2,000,000 of the estimated £4,000,000 restoration cost. After restoration, the tower offered holiday accommodation, with public exhibition space on the ground floor. On 24 February 2011, Hadlow Castle was transferred to the Vivat Trust.

The restoration was completed in February 2013, making it the tallest folly in the United Kingdom. In October 2013, the restoration of the tower was recognised when the Vivat Trust and the Save Hadlow Tower Action Group (SHTAG) won a Lloyd-Webber Angel Award. Work was completed on the interior; the exhibition centre in the tower was open on Thursdays from May to October. Visits are organised by SHTAG. In September 2014, it was shortlisted for the 2014 Kent Design Awards. Following the collapse of Vivat Trust, the tower was offered for sale in May 2016. In 2017 the tower was sold to a private individual for £425,000. The tower was re-listed for sale in 2020 with Sotheby's International Realty for £1,475,000.

== Sources ==
- Bignell, Alan (1986). The Kent Village Book. Countryside Books.
- Thirsk, Joan (1985). Hadlow Castle, a Short History. Hadlow: Hadlow Historical Society. ISBN 0-9510425-0-5.
