= Herbert Enoch Hallam =

English-born historian

Herbert Enoch Hallam, FAHA (28 September 1923 – 8 July 1993) was an English-born historian who spent most of his academic career in Australia. He was professor of medieval history at the University of Western Australia between 1966 and 1988.

== Life ==
Born in Pembridge, Herefordshire, Hallam was the son of a miner who died when he was five. He grew up in the midlands of England, where he attended Ashby-de-la-Zouch Grammar School in Leicestershire with support from a scholarship. After serving in the Royal Air Force during the Second World War, Hallam went up to Jesus College, Cambridge, to read medieval history, where he befriended Harold Perkin. After graduating in 1948, he taught at Spalding Grammar School for five years and then spent six years as a teacher at Loughborough Training College. In the meantime, he completed a PhD at the University of Nottingham, which was awarded in 1957 for his thesis "The Lincolnshire Fenland in the Early Middle Ages: A Social and Economic History"; this examined the reclamation of England's medieval Fens. He published his findings firstly as the pamphlet The New Lands of Elloe in 1954, and then as the book Settlement and Society: A Study of the Early Agrarian History of South Lincolnshire in 1965.

In 1961, Hallam was appointed to a lectureship at the University of Western Australia. Four years later, he was promoted to a readership and in 1966 became professor of medieval history. In 1972, he was elected a fellow of the Australian Academy of the Humanities. He authored Rural England, 1066–1348 in 1981 and edited the second volume, covering 1042 to 1350, of Cambridge University Press's The Agrarian History of England and Wales (1988). Hallam retired in 1988 and lived at York, Western Australia, with his wife, the archaeologist Sylvia Hallam. He died on 8 July 1993.

== Select bibliography ==
- The New Lands of Elloe: A Study of Early Reclamation in Lincolnshire, Department of English Local History Occasional Papers, no. 6 (Leicester: University College, Leicester, 1954).
- Settlement and Society: A Study of the Early Agrarian History of South Lincolnshire, Cambridge Studies in Economic History (Cambridge: Cambridge University Press, 1965).
- Rural England, 1066–1348, Fontana History of England (Atlantic Highlands, N.J.: Humanities Press or Harvester Press, Sussex, 1981).
- (editor) The Agrarian History of England and Wales, vol. 2 (Cambridge: Cambridge University Press, 1988).
