= Sylvia Hallam =

Australian archaeologist

Sylvia Hallam FAHA
- Born: Sylvia Joy Maycock; 17 August 1927; Kettering, Northamptonshire, England
- Died: 3 June 2019 (aged 91); Perth, Western Australia
- Spouse: Herbert Enoch Hallam

Academic work
- Institutions: University of Western Australia

Sylvia Hallam, FAHA (17 August 1927 – 3 June 2019) was an English-born archaeologist who spent most of her academic career in Australia at the University of Western Australia. She is best known as author of Fire and Hearth and as an advocate for the protection of Aboriginal art, particularly at Murujuga in Western Australia.

== Early life and education ==
Sylvia Joy Maycock was born in Kettering, England. Her father was a pharmacist. She won a scholarship to study at Newnham College, Cambridge in 1945. She transferred her studies from natural science to archeology and graduated in 1948, one of the first group of women who were awarded degrees. She then completed an extensive survey of rural settlements in East Anglia between the first and fourth centuries AD, published in 1970 as a Royal Geographical Society Memoir. She was awarded a PhD in 2004 in recognition of that work.

== Career ==
Hallam moved to Perth in 1961, when her husband became lecturer in medieval history at the University of Western Australia (UWA). She was appointed a part-time lecturer in prehistory in 1970 and promoted to full-time in 1973. She rose to associate professor in 1984 and was elected a Fellow of the Australian Academy of the Humanities in the same year. Retiring from UWA in 1989, she continued as an honorary research fellow with the university.

'Fire and Hearth' Forty Years On, a book of essays by colleagues and former students, celebrating Hallam's work was published in 2011 by the Western Australian Museum.

Hallam was a Fellow of the Royal Society of Western Australia and was its first woman president when elected in 1985.

== Selected works ==
- Hallam, Sylvia (1975), Fire and hearth: A study of Aboriginal usage and European usurpation in south-western Australia, Australian Institute of Aboriginal Studies, ISBN 978-0-85575-036-7
- Hallam, Sylvia J. & Tilbrook, Lois (1990). Aborigines of the Southwest Region, 1829–1840 (The Bicentennial Dictionary of Western Australians, Volume VIII). Nedlands, Western Australia: University of Western Australia Press. ISBN 0-85564-296-3.

== Personal ==
Hallam married Herbert Enoch Hallam in 1948. She died on 3 June 2019 in Perth, Western Australia. She was survived by her daughter and three sons. Her husband predeceased her in 1993.
