= Tiffany Margaret Hall =

British engineer (born 1963)

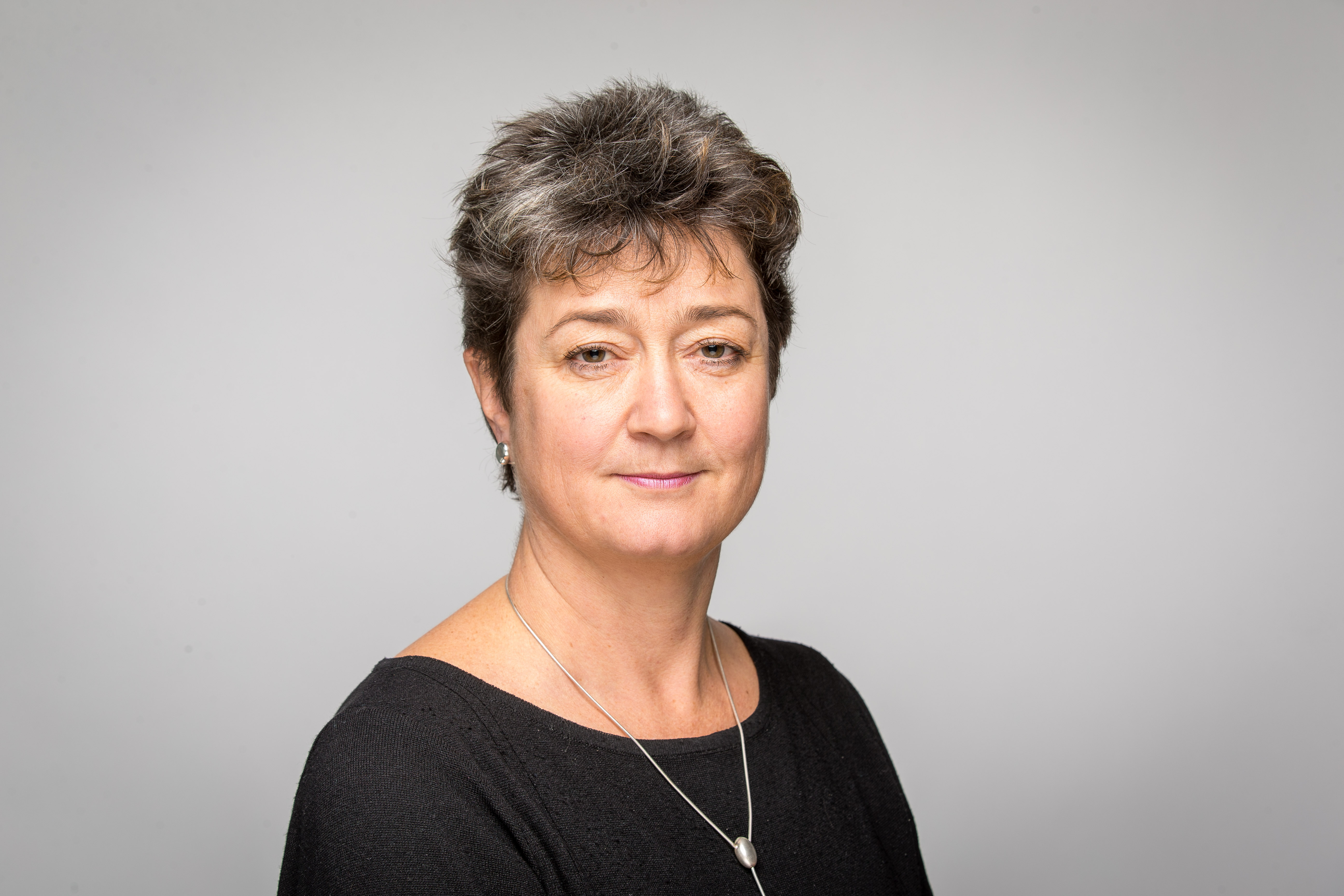
- Born: 24 April 1963 (age 63)
- Known for: Software Engineer

Tiffany Margaret Hall (born 24 April 1963) is a British engineer who has had a career in broadcast engineering and information technology.

== Early life ==
The granddaughter of Margaret Anderson (indexer), Hall attended Walthamstow Hall and Durham University, gaining a BSc in Maths with Computing.

== Career ==
Tiffany Hall is now retired. Her most recent roles were as Chief Information Officer of Cancer Research UK and as Chair of Ada, the National College for Digital Skills

Hall has been addressing UK digital skills with e-skills uk, as a STEM ambassador and by working with department for digital, culture, media and sport on the Tech Talent Charter around diversity in UK tech.

Hall worked at the BBC in IT and broadcast engineering roles including as CIO. Her earlier career was spent in IT roles with Royal Dutch Shell.

From 2003 to 2006, Hall was also a Director of the Parliamentary Broadcasting Unit.

== Awards ==
Hall was awarded CIO of the Year at the UK's 2019 Women in IT Awards Hall was placed in the top ten of the 2019 UK CIO 100 Awards.
