= John Rivers =

Businessman and Lord Mayor of London

Sir John Rivers

Lord Mayor of London
- In office 1573–1574
- Preceded by: Lionel Duckett
- Succeeded by: James Hawes

Sheriff of London
- In office 1565–1566

Personal details
- Died: 1584
- Occupation: grocer

Sir John Rivers (died 27 February 1584) was a Tudor-era businessman who became Lord Mayor of London.

He was born to Richard Rivers, steward of Edward Stafford, 3rd Duke of Buckingham's lands. Alternate spelling includes John Ryvers.

He was a grocer and member of the Worshipful Company of Grocers, Sheriff of London in 1566, and Lord Mayor of London in 1573. He was knighted in 1574 and served as President of St. Thomas' Hospital between 1580 and 1584. He also served as an Alderman for the London wards of Farringdon between 1565 and 1568, Broad Street between 1568 and 1574, and Walbrook between 1574 and 1584.

He married Elizabeth Barne, daughter of Sir George Barne (died 1558), and they had Sir George Rivers, who was a Member of Parliament. Rivers was lay rector at St. Mary's Church, Hadlow, Kent. His grandson, also John Rivers was made a baronet on 19 July 1621. This title survived until the death of Sir Henry Chandos Rivers, 11th Baronet in 1870.
