= Hadlow =

Village in Kent, England

Coordinates: 51.23027°N 0.34037°E

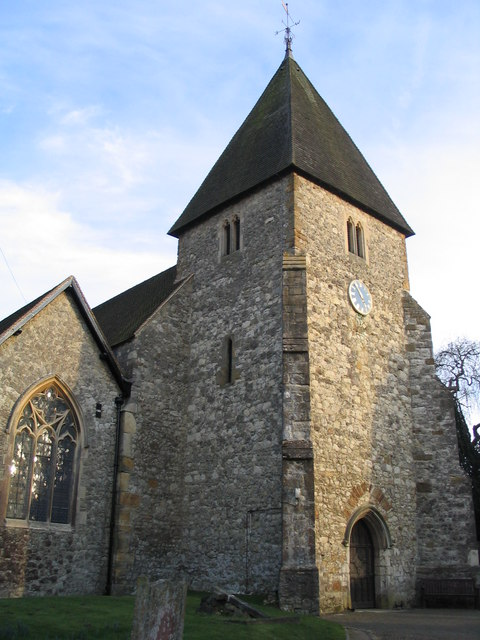
- St Mary's Church

- Location within Kent
- Population: 3,983 (2011 Census including Golden Green)
- OS grid reference: TQ635505
- District: Tonbridge and Malling
- Shire county: Kent
- Region: South East
- Country: England
- Sovereign state: United Kingdom
- Post town: Tonbridge
- Postcode district: TN11
- Dialling code: 01732
- Police: Kent
- Fire: Kent
- Ambulance: South East Coast
- UK Parliament: Tonbridge

Hadlow is a village and civil parish in the borough of Tonbridge and Malling in Kent, England. It is situated in the Medway valley, north-east of Tonbridge and south-west of Maidstone.

The Saxon name for the settlement was Haeselholte (in the Textus Roffensis). The Domesday Book records it as Haslow and in the Middle Ages it became Hadloe and then Hadlow.

== History ==
Evidence of settlement in the Hadlow area dates back to the Stone Age implements, which have been found near the village. The Domesday entry for the village reads:-

Richard de Tonebridge holds of the bishop (of Baieux) Haslow. It was taxed at six sulings. The arable land is twelve carucates. In demesne there are three, and forty-seven villeins, with fifteen borderers, having fifteen carucates. There is a church and ten servants, and two mills of eleven shillings, and twelve fisheries of seven shillings and six-pence, and twelve acres of meadow, Wood for the pannage of sixty hogs. In the time of king Edward the Confessor, and afterwards, and now, it was and is worth thirty pounds. Eddeva held it of king Edward.

During the Middle Ages the manor of Hadlow was owned by the Knights Hospitallers, then the Earls of Gloucester, followed by the Earls of Stafford, who were elevated to the Dukes of Buckingham in 1444. The third Duke of Buckingham was executed in 1521, and the manor went through a series of ownership changes. Sir Henry Guildford being granted the manor by Henry VIII, and the manor passed back to the Crown on his death, it was then granted to the Duke of Northumberland, and again returned to the Crown. in 1558, Henry Carey, the first Baron Hunsdon, received it from Elizabeth I, later passing to his two sons, one of whom Sir George Carey, owned the manor in 1586 The manor house was called Court Lodge at this time.

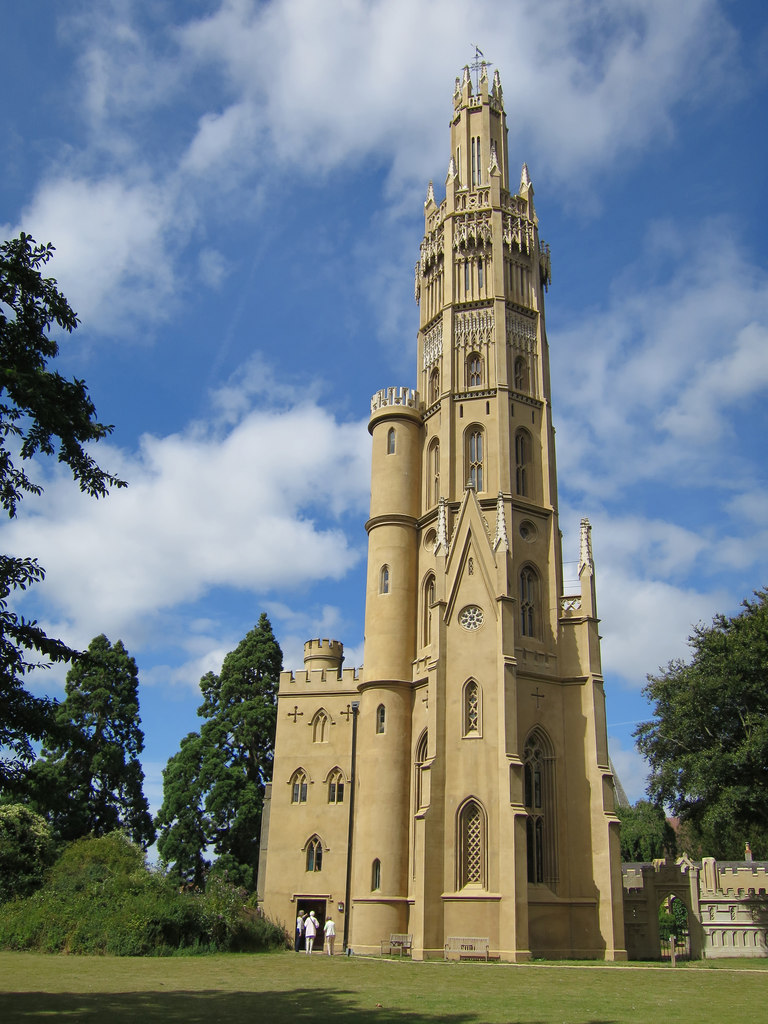
Hadlow Tower

Early in the 17th century, it was sold to James Faircloth, a London Physician. He sold it to George Rivers, second son of Sir George Rivers of Chafford. A new manor house, Hadlow Court Lodge was built c.1635. The Rivers family also owned Fish Hall, Tonbridge, which was in the possession of the Fane family during the time of Henry VIII but was later bought by the Rivers. In 1657 the manor was the property of Sir Thomas Rivers. but it was sold, along with Fish Hall, during the reign of Charles II to Jeffrey Amherst. He sold the manor and Fish Hall to John France in 1700. John France had two daughters, Sarah (baptised 1700) and Elizabeth (baptised 1703). They shared the estate upon the death of their father, Elizabeth taking Fish Hall, and Sarah taking Hadlow manor. Sarah married Walter Barton. Their first son, John, was born deaf, blind and dumb. Their second son, Walter, inherited a large fortune from his uncle Richard May in 1763, on condition that he took the surname May. Walter May married Elizabeth Stanford of Strettit Place, East Peckham in 1775. He inherited Hadlow Court Lodge in 1786 and immediately set to work demolishing Hadlow Court Lodge and building Hadlow Castle.

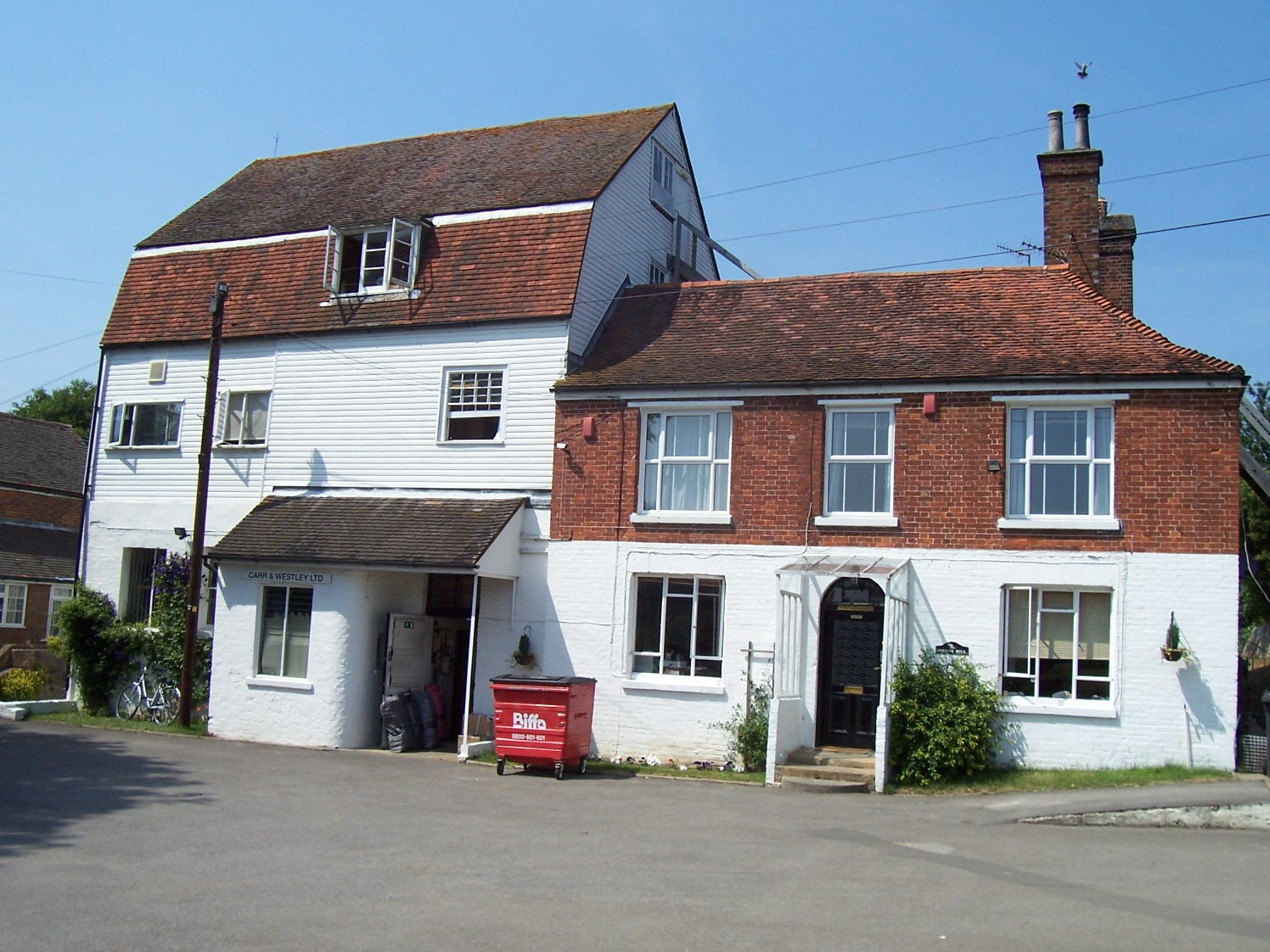
Bourne Mill

His son Walter Barton May added a 153 feet (47 m) high folly in 1835. The folly was damaged in the Great Storm of 1987. Being Grade I listed and previously being included in the 1998 World Monuments Watch List of 100 Most Endangered Sites by the World Monuments Fund, the owner of the folly was issued with a Compulsory Purchase Order by Tonbridge and Malling Borough Council in July 2006.

The main village street is brick-paved and there are several old houses and two Tudor inns. Hadlow Pharmacy on The Square has a history which can be traced back to at least 1856. The River Bourne flows through the parish, and formerly powered a watermill in the village (Bourne mill), which has been the home of Carr & Westley since they moved from London during the blitz and two in Golden Green (Goldhill Mill and Pierce Mill). A set of Hopper huts from North Frith Farm has been dismantled and re-erected at the Museum of Kent Life, Sandling.

The village's amateur dramatic society, Hadlow Amateur Dramatic Society (HADS), have been performing pantomimes and dramatic pieces to Hadlow for over 30 years.

== Churches ==
The church is dedicated to St Mary, and was first mentioned in 975, thus it celebrated 1000 years in 1975. Hadlow was given to Eddeva in 1018, and parts of the church date to this time. The tower dates to the thirteenth century or earlier. The main door of the church has the date 1637 on it. This is often misread as 1037 due to most of the upper part of the first 6 being missing. The clock, by John Thwaites of Clerkenwell, dates from 1791. In the churchyard is a 19th-century memorial to the drowning locally of 30 hop-pickers.

Other churches and chapels in Hadlow include a Baptist Chapel in Court Lane, which was built in 1830. The Catholic chapel on Maidstone Road is dedicated to St Peter. In Golden Green there was a Wesleyan chapel which opened in 1899 and closed in 1956. A tin tabernacle had been built in Golden Green by 1882, as of 2024, it remains standing.

== Breweries ==
Hadlow had working breweries between the early eighteenth century and the late 1940s. The earliest reference to a brewery in Hadlow is in 1710 when John Barton, Yeoman of Hadlow is mentioned in connection with a newly erected malthouse in Hadlow Street. In 1840 there was a complaint that the drain leading from the Close Brewery was a nuisance.

In 1851 the brewery was being run by Messrs Harrison & Taylor and in 1858 they sold the business to Edward Kenward of Marden and William Barnett of Willingdon, Sussex . Thomas Simmonds of East Peckham and Nelson Kenward were also parties, part purchasing and part leasing the brewery. in 1859 it was agreed that a new 15 quarter malthouse would be erected. This building being the one nearly parallel to the High Street. In 1868 Edward Kenward was bankrupt, owing £9,500. The partnership was dissolved in that year by mutual consent. Edward and Trayton Kenward then became partners, but this partnership was also dissolved and all properties assigned to Trayton Kenward.

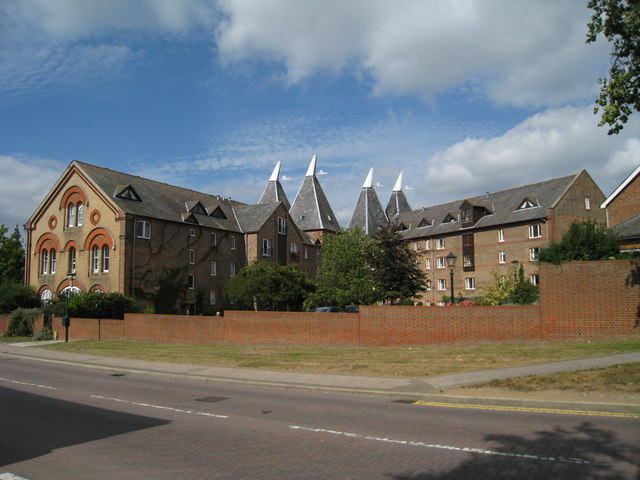
The converted maltings

In October 1871, Trayton and Charles Kenward entered into partnership with John Court. The business operating under the name of Kenward & Court. Sometime after this a second maltings was added, this running alongside Carpenters Lane. In 1881 the brewery supplied 68 public houses and was listed as 637th in the list of the first thousand limited companies. Kenward & Court was taken over by Charles Hammerton & Co. Ltd. in 1945. Beer was last brewed in September 1949. In 1952 Hammerton's was bought out by Watney's, who then sold the brewery to Charrington's. Malting continued for several years and the brewery closed in the late 1960s, having been used as a distribution centre towards the end. The buildings gradually became derelict through the 1970s, and the Hadlow Society pressed for the buildings to be listed, which was done in July 1979. There was much debate within the village as to whether the buildings should be demolished or converted. The buildings were converted into flats in 1990.

In 2005, Harvey's of Lewes brewed Hadlow Ale to commemorate Kenward & Court and celebrate the reopening of the now closed Two Brewers pub (formerly the Fiddling Monkey and before that the Albion). The buildings are Grade II listed.

Another brewery stood at Style Place, Hadlow. This brewery was started in the 1830s by William Simmons, being in partnership with Henry Simmons in 1852 with William Martin joining them by 1855. The business was sold to Messrs Style & Winch of Chatham in 1863. The brewery buildings have been converted to housing and are now known as Caxton Place. The surviving building is Grade II listed.

== Education ==
Hadlow College of Agriculture and Horticulture was established in 1968. It is concerned with a wide range of land-based training including agriculture, horticulture, medicinal horticulture, landscape management, garden design, equine management, animal management and sciences, sports fisheries and countryside management.

Hadlow Rural Community School is a secondary school that was established in the village in 2013 as part of the free schools programme.

Hadlow Primary School is located on School Lane and has 7 classes, one form entry, and approx 200 pupils. The school has a large playing field and is currently fundraising for a new community swimming pool.

== Hadlow Cricket Club ==
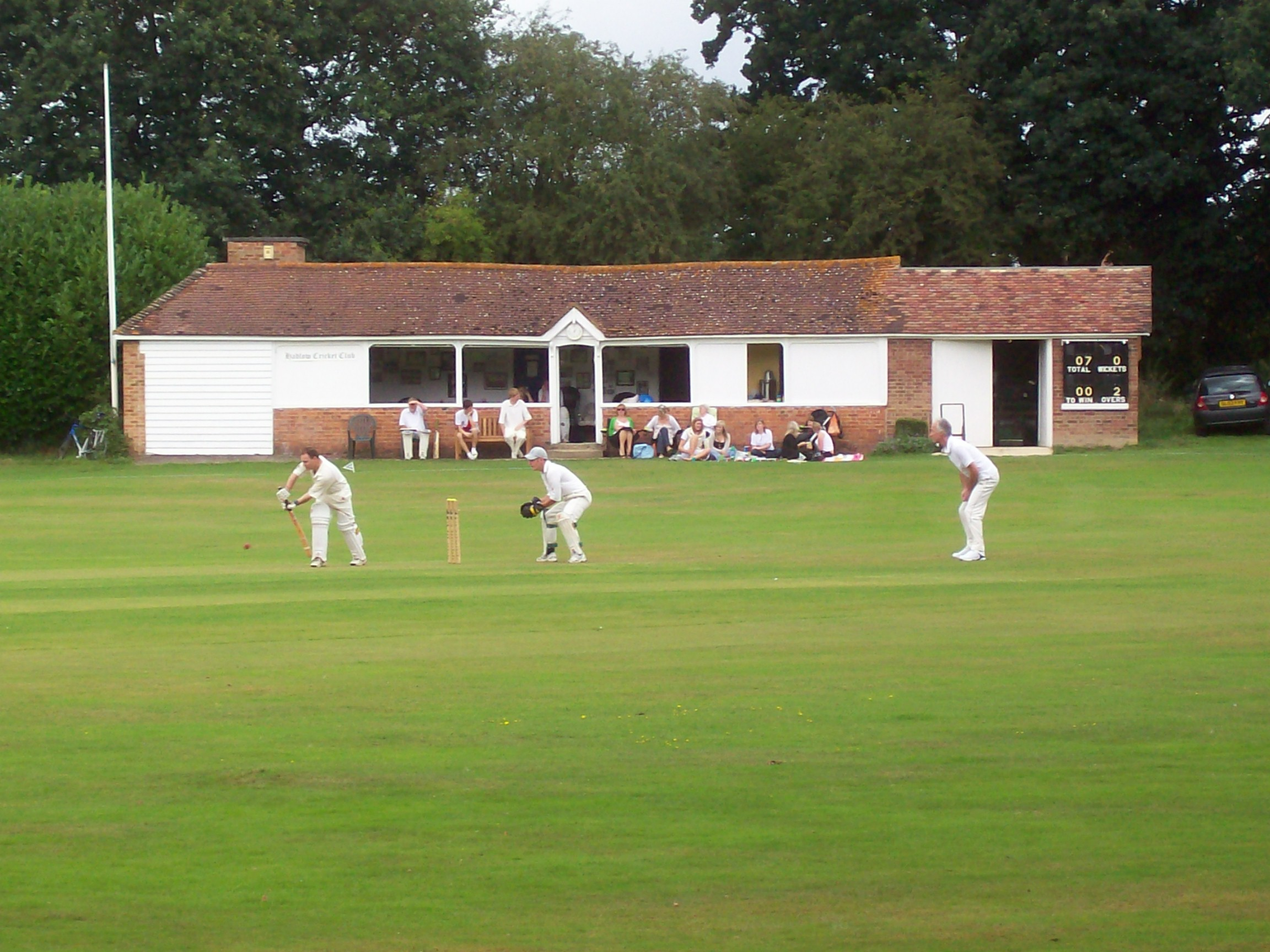
The cricket ground

Hadlow Cricket Club dates back to the mid-eighteenth century. Cricket is still played in Hadlow, the ground being located off Common Road, to the north of the village.

== Notable people ==
- William Caxton was probably born in the village.
- Stephen Crow (born 1965), computer game programmer was born in Hadlow.
- Allison Fisher (born 1968), world snooker champion grew up in Hadlow.
- Bernard Hailstone (1910–87), artist, lived in Hadlow and saved the tower of Hadlow Castle from demolition.
- John Rivers, (died 1584), Sheriff of London 1565–66 and Lord Mayor of London 1573–74 was lay rector of Hadlow.
- Joan Thirsk, (1922–2013), author and historian lived in Hadlow and wrote many books on the village.
- Denton Welch, (1915–1948) writer and painter lived at Pitts Folly Cottage, Tonbridge Road, Hadlow.

== Sources ==
- Bignell, Alan (1986). The Kent Village Book. Countryside Books.
