= Alan Everitt =

Local historian (1926–2008)

Alan Milner Everitt, FBA, FRHistS (17 August 1926 – 8 December 2008) was a British local historian. He was a leading figure in the development of English provincial history in the forty years after the Second World War.

== Life and career ==
Alan Milner Everitt was born on 17 August 1926, and grew up in the town of Sevenoaks. He earned his master's degree from the University of St Andrews in 1951 and a doctorate from the University of London in 1957, studying the prelude to the English Civil War under the supervision of R. C. Latham. That year, Everitt joined the University of Leicester as a research assistant to the economic and social historian Joan Thirsk. In 1968, he succeeded W. G. Hoskins as Hatton Professor of English Local History, a chair he held until 1982.

After his retirement, in 1989, Everitt was elected a Fellow of the British Academy.

Everitt died on 8 December 2008, at the age of 82. He is buried at All Saints Church, Kimcote, Leicestershire.

== Books ==
Everitt was the author or editor of many books on English local history, including the ones listed below.

=== Authored ===
- The County Committee of Kent in the Civil War (1957)
- The Community of Kent and the Great Rebellion, 1640–1660 (1966)
- Change in the Provinces: The Seventeenth Century (1969)
- New Avenues in English Local History (1970)
- The Pattern of Rural Dissent: The Nineteenth Century (1972)
- Landscape and Community in England (1985)
- Continuity and Colonization: The Evolution of Kentish Settlement (1986)

=== Edited ===
- Suffolk and the Great Rebellion, 1640-1660 (1960)
- Perspectives in English Urban History (1973)
- English Local History at Leicester 1948–1978 (with Margery Tranter, 1981)
