= Golden Green =

Coordinates: 51.211°N 0.343°E

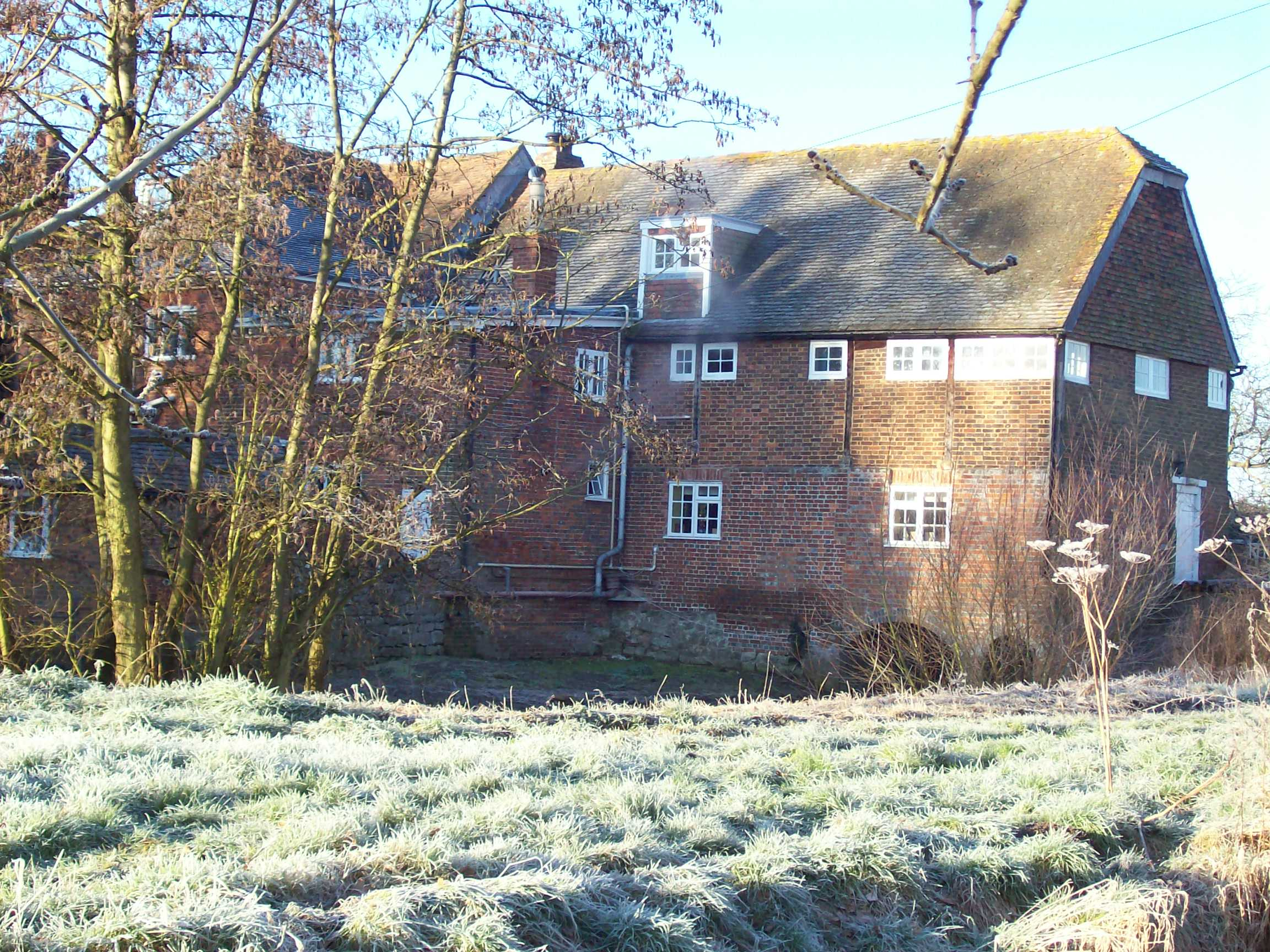
- Goldhill Mill

- Location within Kent
- OS grid reference: TQ638483
- Civil parish: Hadlow
- District: Tonbridge and Malling
- Shire county: Kent
- Region: South East
- Country: England
- Sovereign state: United Kingdom
- Post town: Tonbridge
- Postcode district: TN11 0
- Police: Kent
- Fire: Kent
- Ambulance: South East Coast
- UK Parliament: Tonbridge

Golden Green is a village in the Medway valley near Tonbridge in Kent, England. It is 1 mile (1.6 km) from the larger village of Hadlow (of which it is part of the civil parish) and 4 miles (6 km) from the town of Tonbridge.

== Location ==
Golden Green has a population of around 350. The surrounding area is predominantly agricultural, with fruit orchards and cereals as the principal crops. It stands on a ridge, with the River Medway to the south and the River Bourne to the north. Goldhill Mill is the only watermill on the Bourne that retains its machinery. The village is popular with commuters and has many expensive houses. Barnes Street hamlet is immediately adjacent along the same minor road. The Bell Inn public house is in the village centre. There are no shops or schools, but the Golden Green Mission Church—a Grade II-listed tin tabernacle opened in about 1914—serves Anglican worshippers. It is a chapel of ease to St. Mary's Church, Hadlow.

== Hartlake disaster ==
On 20 October 1853, a wagon carrying Gypsy and Irish hop pickers back to their campsite overturned on Hartlake bridge, tipping its occupants into a flood-swollen River Medway. The accident, known as the Hartlake disaster, resulted in the deaths of 30 people. An inquest into the disaster held at the Bell Inn in the village blamed the Medway Navigation Company for failing to adequately maintain the old wooden bridge.

== Aircraft accident ==
On 6 August 1924, Farman F.60 Goliath F-ADDT Languedoc of Air Union was on a scheduled international passenger flight from Paris to Croydon when the port engine failed. A forced landing was made at Golden Green. One person amongst the pilot and five passengers on board was injured. The aircraft was dismantled to allow removal. It was later repaired and returned to service. In 1931, the aircraft was written off when it crashed shortly after taking off from Marden Airfield, Kent.
