= Margaret Anderson (indexer) =

British biochemist and scientific indexer

Margaret Dampier Anderson
- Born: 21 April 1900
- Died: 1997
- Citizenship: British
- Education: University College, Exeter; Newnham College, Cambridge (M.A.)
- Spouse: Dr. Alan Bruce Anderson
- Awards: Wheatley Medal; Carey Award
- Scientific career
- Fields: Biochemistry, indexing

Margaret Dampier Anderson (née Whetham; 1900–1997) was a British biochemist and scientific indexer. She published four scientific articles in the 1920s before marrying in 1927 and began indexing books beginning in 1960.

== Life ==
Margaret Whetham was born on 21 April 1900, the daughter of William Cecil Dampier Whetham, a Cambridge-educated scientist and agricultural academic, and his wife Catherine Durning Holt, a daughter of Liverpool merchant Robert Durning Holt who had also pursued an education at Cambridge. One of her many great aunts (the “Potter sisters”) was social reformer Beatrice Webb. She had one brother and four sisters, including Edith Holt Whetham. Her family owned a small manor house in Devon, and also inherited a small estate in Hilfield, Dorset where they spent family vacations.

Margaret Whetham attended University College, Exeter and then earned her M.A. from Newnham College, Cambridge in 1926. While in graduate school, she worked with Marjory Stephenson including work on the washed suspension technique, which had originated with Louis Pasteur, for extracting enzymes from bacteria. Whetham co-authored four scientific papers with Stephenson and held the Old Students Jubilee Research Fellowship in 1926–27.

She married Dr. Alan Bruce Anderson, a clinical pathologist, on 12 September 1927, and had five children and sixteen grandchildren including Tiffany Margaret Hall.

== Work ==
She abstracted scientific articles for several years before beginning to work as a freelance scientific indexer in 1960, creating indexes for 567 books over her career. Anderson joined the Society of Indexers two years later and served as its treasurer, membership secretary, member of the board of assessors, and vice-president over the next several decades. She was awarded the Wheatley Medal by the Society in 1975 for her index to Copy-editing: The Cambridge Handbook. Eight years later, the Society presented her with its Carey Award for "outstanding services to indexing".
