= The Agrarian History of England and Wales =

History book series

The Agrarian History of England and Wales is an academic work, published by Cambridge University Press, which in 8 volumes covers the period from the origins to 1939. Vols. 1, 5 and 7 are each in two parts. Joan Thirsk edited volumes 4 and 5, and was appointed in 1974 general editor of the following volumes (6 to 8).

== Volumes ==
Details for each volume
Vol.	Period covered	Published in	ISBN	Pages	Authors
1,1	Prehistory				Edited by Stuart Piggott
1,2	A.D. 43–1042	2011		1080	Edited by H. P. R. Finberg
2	1042-1350	1988		1128	Edited by H.E. Hallam
3	1200–1500		ISBN 0-521-20074-1, ISBN 978-0-521-20074-5	1008	Edward Miller, Joan Thirsk, Stuart Piggott, H. P. R. Finberg, H. E. Hallam, G. E. Mingay, E. J. T. Collins, Edith Holt Whetham
4	1500–1640	1967	ISBN 978-0521066174 (Hardcover); ISBN 978-0521200202 (Paperback)	919	Edited by Joan Thirsk
5,1	1640–1750: Regional farming systems	1984			Edited by Joan Thirsk
5,2	1640–1750: Agrarian change	1985		856	Edited by Joan Thirsk
6	1750–1850	1989		1248	Edited by G. E. Mingay
7,1	1850–1914	2011		2333	Edited by E. J. T. Collins
7,2	1850–1914				Edited by E. J. T. Collins
8	1914–1939	1978		384	Edited by E. H. Whetham

== Online volumes ==
Several volumes and chapters are online. See online copies.
