= National College Creative Industries =

Coordinates: 51°28′49″N 0°15′15″E

National College Creative Industries, formally the National College for the Creative and Cultural Industries, is a college providing technical skills for the creative industries, based in Thurrock, Essex, England. It was established in 2016. It is supported by a group of employers including the BBC, the National Theatre, Broadcasting, Entertainment, Cinematograph and Theatre Union (BECTU) and the Association of British Theatre Technicians (ABTT).

It is one of a group of five new colleges announced by the British government in May 2016, the others being the National College for Digital Skills (opened September 2016); the National College for High Speed Rail based in Birmingham and Doncaster; the National College for Nuclear ("under development" as of March 2017); and the National College for Onshore Oil and Gas (reportedly "stalled" pending discussion of fracking).

In March 2017 the college failed to gain accreditation on the Skills Funding Agency's Register of Apprenticeship Training Providers, and stated that this was due to a "technicality" in their application.
