= Walter Barton May =

British industrialist (1783–1855)

Walter Barton May (c. 1783 – 31 May 1855) was a 19th-century English industrialist, famous for ordering the construction of Hadlow Castle.
