= River Bourne, Kent =

River in Kent, England

River Bourne
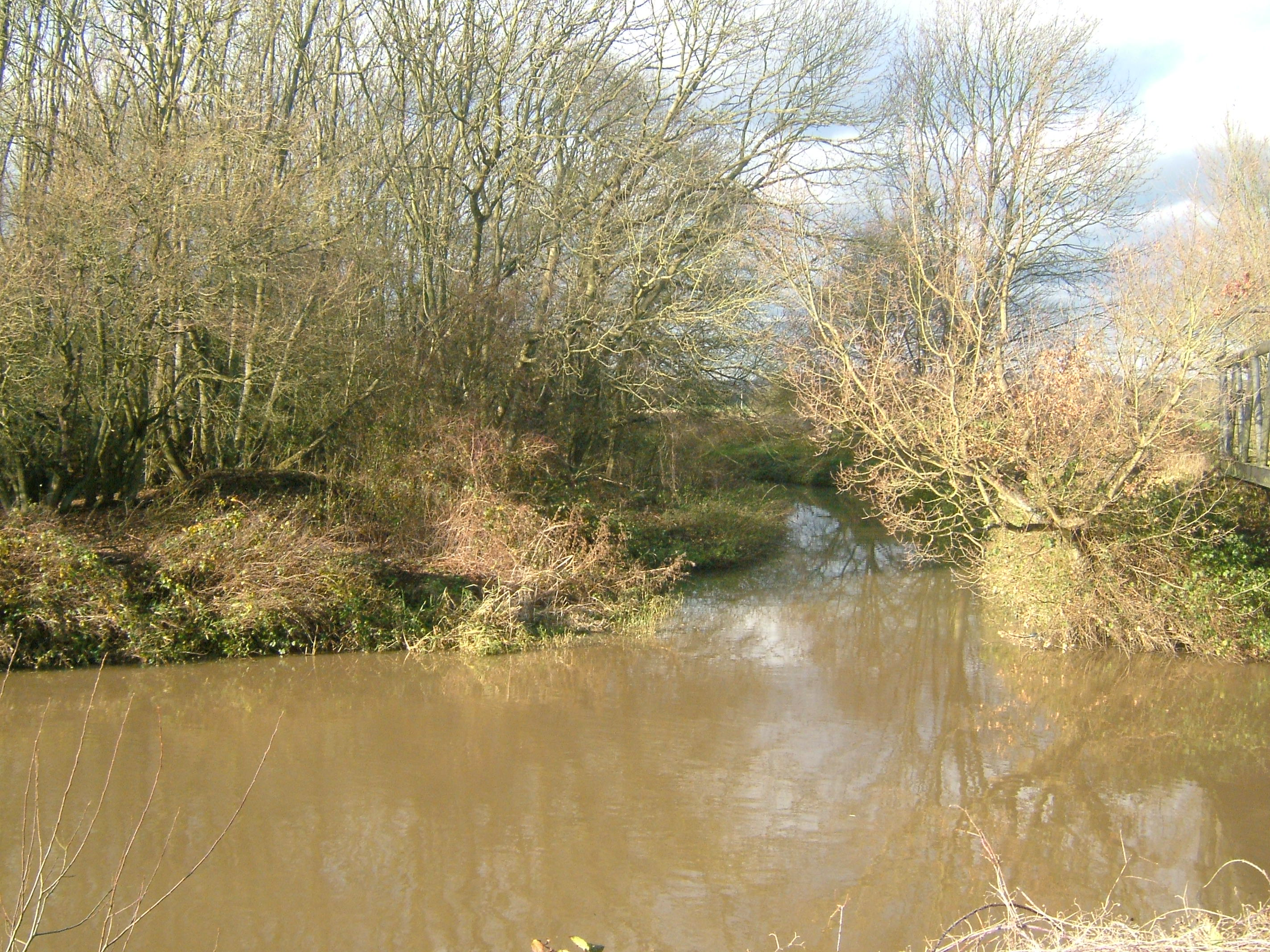
- The River Bourne enters the Medway

Physical characteristics
- Source
  - location: Ightham. TQ 597 567
  - coordinates: 51°17′13″N 0°17′28″E
  - elevation: 249 feet (76 m)
- Mouth
  - location: River Medway, East Peckham. TQ 664 477
  - coordinates: 51°12′15″N 0°22′59″E
  - elevation: 42 feet (13 m)
- Length: 10 mi (16 km)

Rivers of Kent

The River Bourne rises in the parish of Ightham, Kent and flows in a generally south easterly direction through the parishes of Borough Green, Platt, Plaxtol, West Peckham, Hadlow, and East Peckham where it joins the River Medway. In the 18th century the river was known as the Busty or Buster, the Shode or Sheet, but is not known by these names nowadays. A bourne is a type of stream, while shode means a branch of a river.

It gives its name to the Bourne ward in Tonbridge and Malling Borough.

== Geography ==
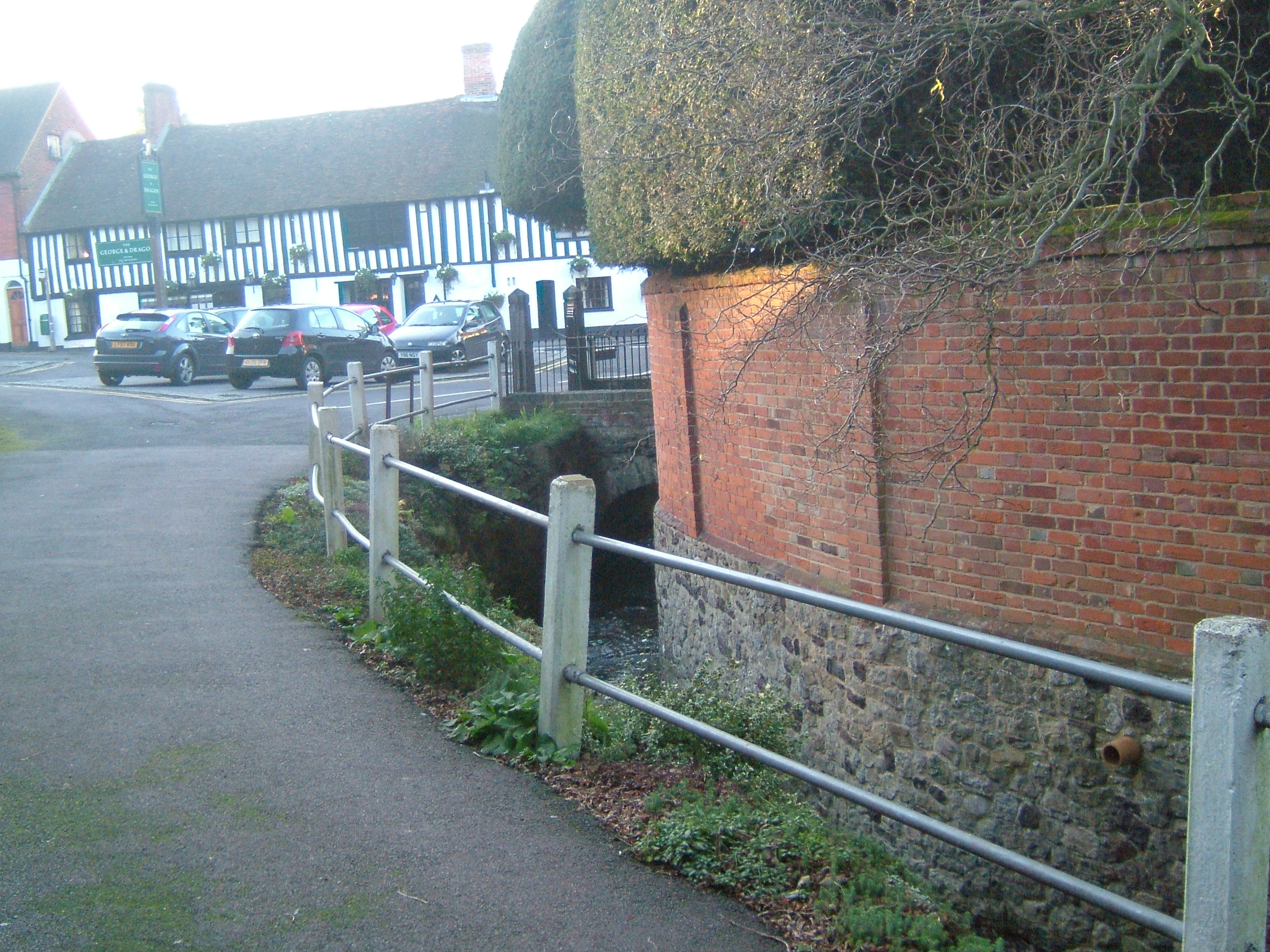
The river emerges from a culvert, and flows along Busty Lane, Ightham.

Several springs feed into the headwaters of the River Bourne and there are three contenders for its actual main source. It could be a spring on the North Downs at New House Farm, Yaldham, though the Environment Agency prefers a spring to the west of Oldbury Hill. It could be a spring on Oldbury Hill which feeds the Waterflash, a tree-ringed pond, which drains to the north of the hill. Oldbury Hill is on the Greensand Ridge. These merge in Ightham where the Bourne has cut a 117 feet (36 m) deep gorge through the limestone. In 1891 ice age relics were found near here in a quarry. The river passes through woods to Basted, where a mill pond gives clues to its industrial past. From Ightham through Hadlow to Golden Green, the river powered numerous watermills. Road names are full of mill references. The principal products were flour and paper. The area of the Medway Valley near East Peckham is prone to flooding and the River Bourne contributes much water, so is regularly monitored and dredged to ensure an uninterrupted water flow. There is a gauging station at Hadlow (TQ 632 497 51°13′23″N 0°20′17″E).

== Watermills ==
The River Bourne was used to power a number of watermills in its 10-mile (16 km) length. In order from source these were: Old Mill, Borough Green (corn?); Basted Mill (Platt parish) (paper); Lower Basted Mill, Plaxtol (corn?); Winfield Mill, (corn); Longmill (corn); Roughway Paper Mill; Hamptons Paper Mill (West Peckham parish); Oxonhoath Mill (corn); Bourne Mill (corn), Hadlow; Goldhill Mill (corn), Golden Green; Pierce Mill (corn); and finally Little Mill (corn), East Peckham.

=== Old Mill, Borough Green ===
TQ 606 565 51°17′06″N 0°18′14″E

Little is known of it except that the millpond was about 75 yards (68.58 m) long and 25 feet (7.62 m) wide at the mill, giving an area of up to 625 square yards (523 m^{2}). The head was about 6 feet (1.83 m).

=== Basted Paper Mill, Platt ===
TQ 607 557 51°16′40″N 0°18′18″E

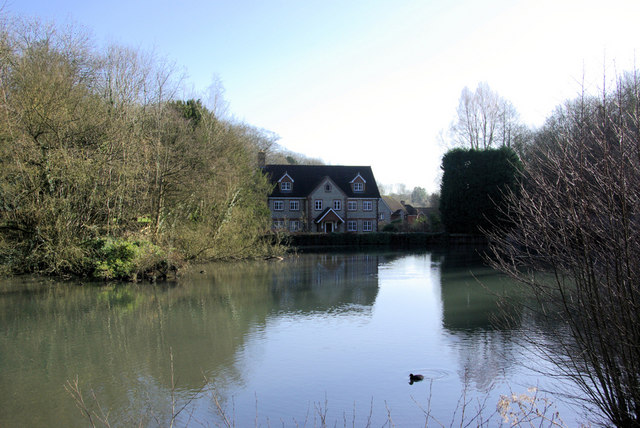
Basted Mill Pond

This paper mill was marked on Hasted's map and known to be in operation in 1716. It may be the paper mill at Wrotham which William Quelch was working in the period 1723–31. The mill pond was 175 yards (160.02 m) long and 75 feet (22.86 m) wide at the mill, giving an area of 4,375 square yards (3,658 m^{2}). George How Green was the occupier of the mill in 1835 when he leased Hamptons Paper Mill. The mill burnt down in 1917 and was rebuilt and worked by steam power until 1960. It finally closed after damage suffered in the floods of September 1968. The mill supplied paper used for postage stamps. Although often referred to as being in Borough Green, the mill site actually stands within the parish of Platt.

=== Lower Basted (Johns) Mill, Plaxtol ===
TQ 605 554 51°16′30″N 0°18′07″E

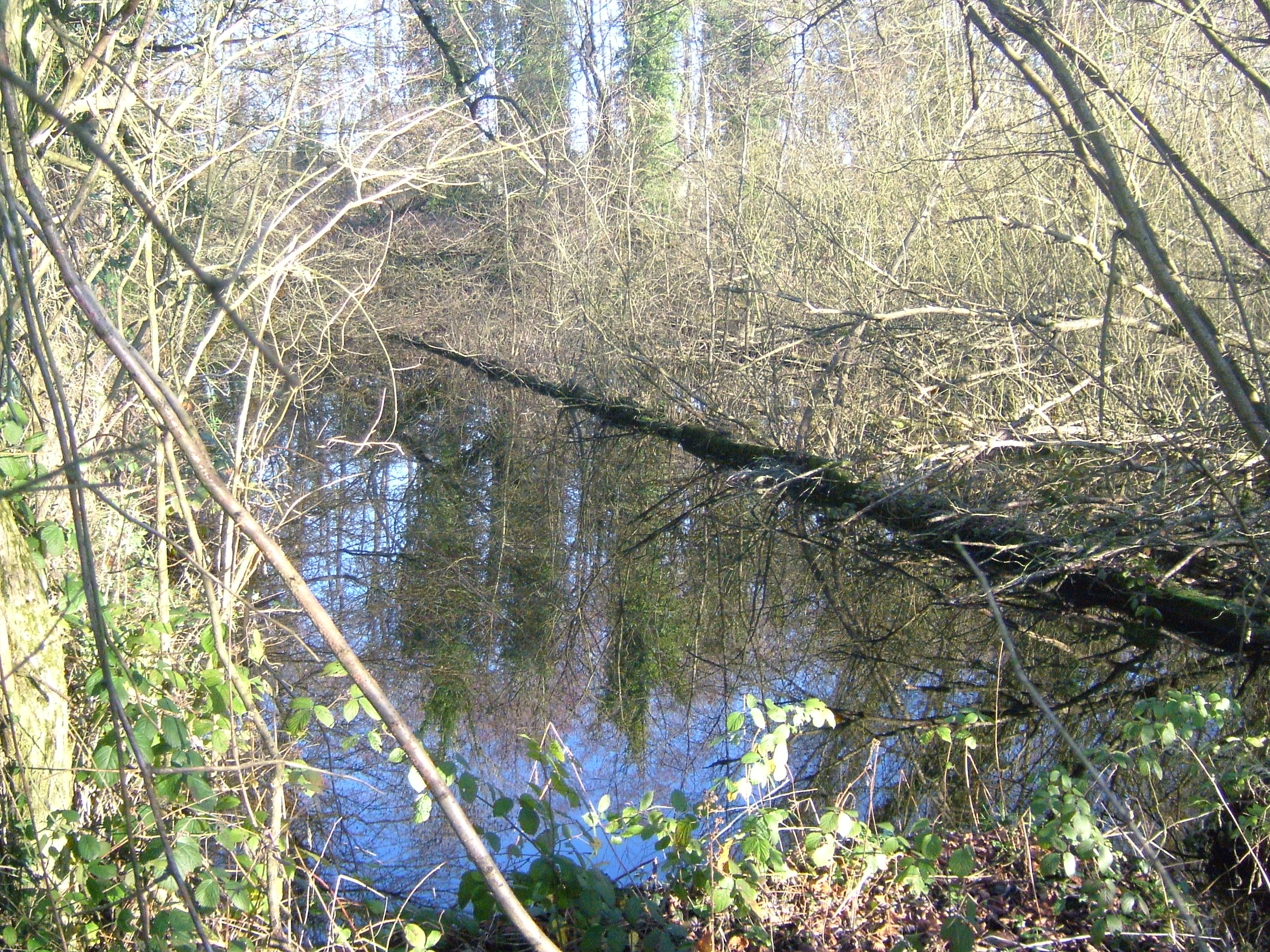
Site of John's Mill

This mill was about 100 yd (91 m) downstream of the Basted Paper Mill. This mill was marked as John's Mill on an 1825 map. The only other evidence for the mill was two fields on the Wrotham tithe map, 1840 named "Mill meadow and orchard" and "Mill meadow and old road" in the ownership of H A Wildes and the occupation of John Benge.

=== Winfield Mill, Plaxtol ===
TQ 607 551 51°16′20″N 0°18′17″E

Winfield Mill c1940

Winfield mill was a corn mill built of ragstone in 1836 by Eliza Carter. Millers include James Full, who died 18 March 1871 aged 66, and was buried in Plaxtol churchyard. The mill was still standing in 1940, but by 1950 it was a ruin. The Upright Shaft was of wood and the Great Spur Wheel was of compass arm construction, as shown on a photograph of 1955. The overshot waterwheel was 11 feet (3.35 m) in diameter and 12 feet (3.66 m) wide, housed internally in the mill, and was constructed in 1874 by Messrs. Weeks of Maidstone. Some stones still remain at the site.

An earlier mill on this site was known as "Windfield Mille" in 1699 and was then in the occupation of John Dutnell; it was previously in the occupation of Thomas Farrett.

=== Longmill, Plaxtol ===
TQ 614 536 51°15′31″N 0°18′51″E

A long-lost corn mill site, commemorated today by Longmill Lane.

=== Roughway Paper Mill, Plaxtol ===
TQ 615 528 51°15′05″N 0°18′55″E

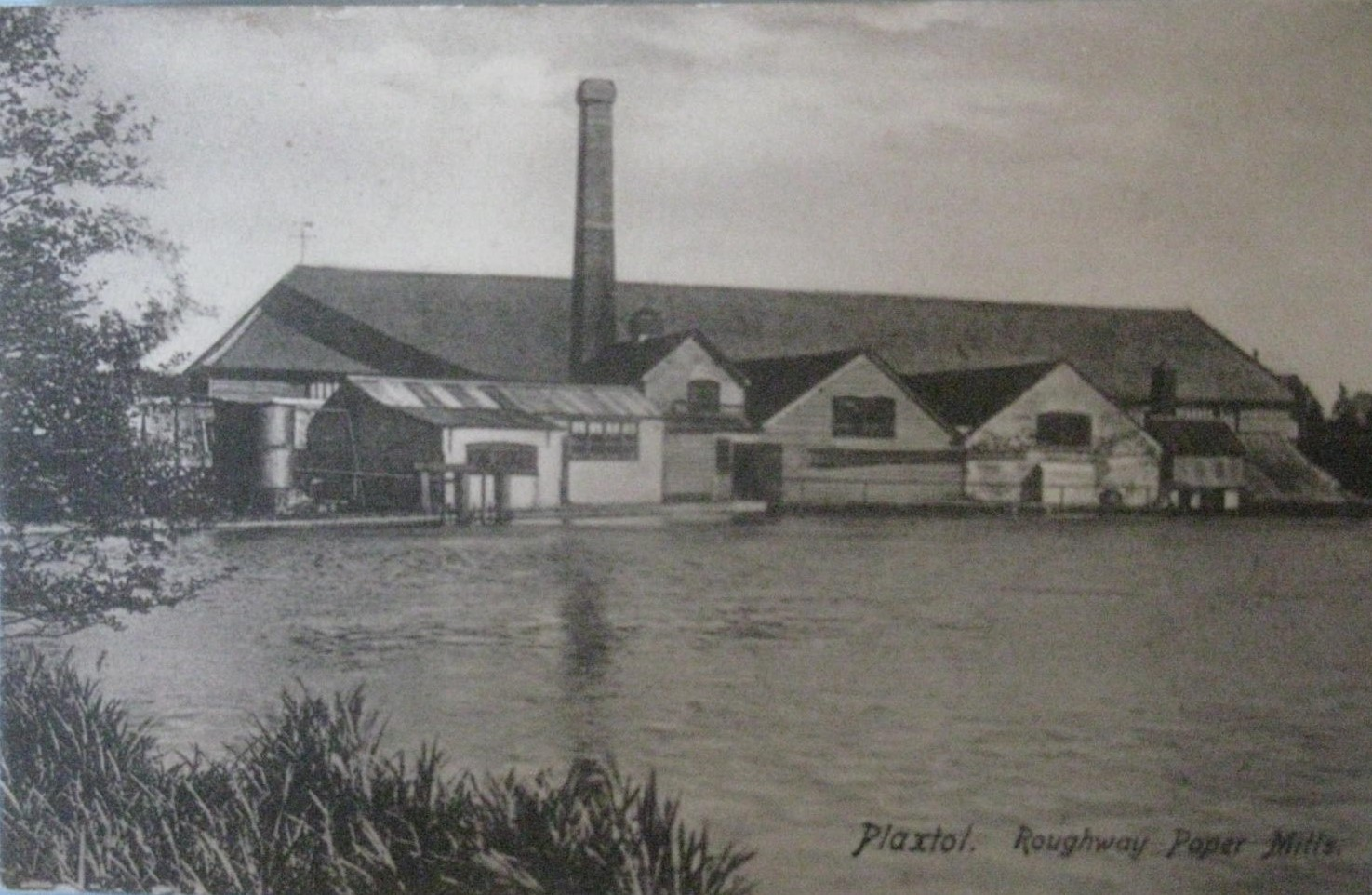
Roughway Paper Mill, 1904.

This mill was built c.1807 and was powered by steam and water. The mills were worked by Messrs, Turner & Co from at least 1862 to post 1882 and produced paper which Messrs. De La Rue used for printing colonial postage stamps. Latterly a 9 feet (2.74 m) diameter by 4 feet (1.22 m) wide breastshot waterwheel was used to drive bellows for the steam engine. There was a tall chimney which was a local landmark but this was demolished in 1997 after a fire.

=== Hamptons Paper Mill, West Peckham ===
TQ 617 521 51°14′42″N 0°19′04″E

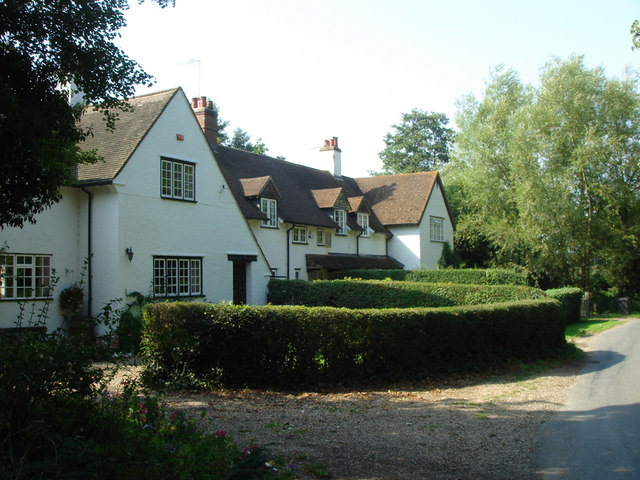
Old Mill Cottages, Hamptons Road

This paper mill was built in 1740 by Thomas West, carpenter, of West Peckham for William Burtenshaw, papermaker, of Wrotham for £175 and was active until the 1880s. When built it was 75 feet (22.86 m) long and 24 feet (7.32 m) wide. In 1759 the mill was leased by Isabella and William Dalyson to Mrs Elizabeth Buttonshaw for 21 years at £45 per annum. Previous occupiers of the mill were William Steddolph and Thomas Dalison. John Buttonshaw died on 12 February 1827 and the lease then passed to Elizabeth Buttonshaw. In 1835 John Buttanshaw surrendered his lease on the mill to Maximilian Dudley Digges Dalison. George How Green leasing the mill from 1833 at £100 per annum, and insuring the mill and building for a total of £1,500.

Only traces of the foundations remain. It probably had an overshot waterwheel, housed internally. A paper-making machine was sold from this mill in 1872 . The mill straddled the parish boundary of Shipbourne and West Peckham. It was demolished c.1890. The mill cottages survive on the opposite side of the road to the mill site.

=== Oxonhoath Mill, West Peckham ===
TQ 621 515 51°14′22″N 0°19′24″E

The site has been occupied since 1259. It may be the site of "Toyesmede mill" lying in the Hadlow boundary of the Lowy of Tonbridge in c.1258. The mill has at various times been a fulling mill and a corn mill. The mill was at one time owned by the Geary family and worked by William Young and his son Edward in the period 1847–75. Robert Blunden was the miller in 1882. The mill building was standing in 1930 although the machinery had been removed by then. It had a single storey brick base and three storeys built of timber on top. Only a part of the lower walls remain today.

=== Bourne (Hope, Lambert's) Mill, Hadlow ===
TQ 627 503 51°13′43″N 0°19′52″E

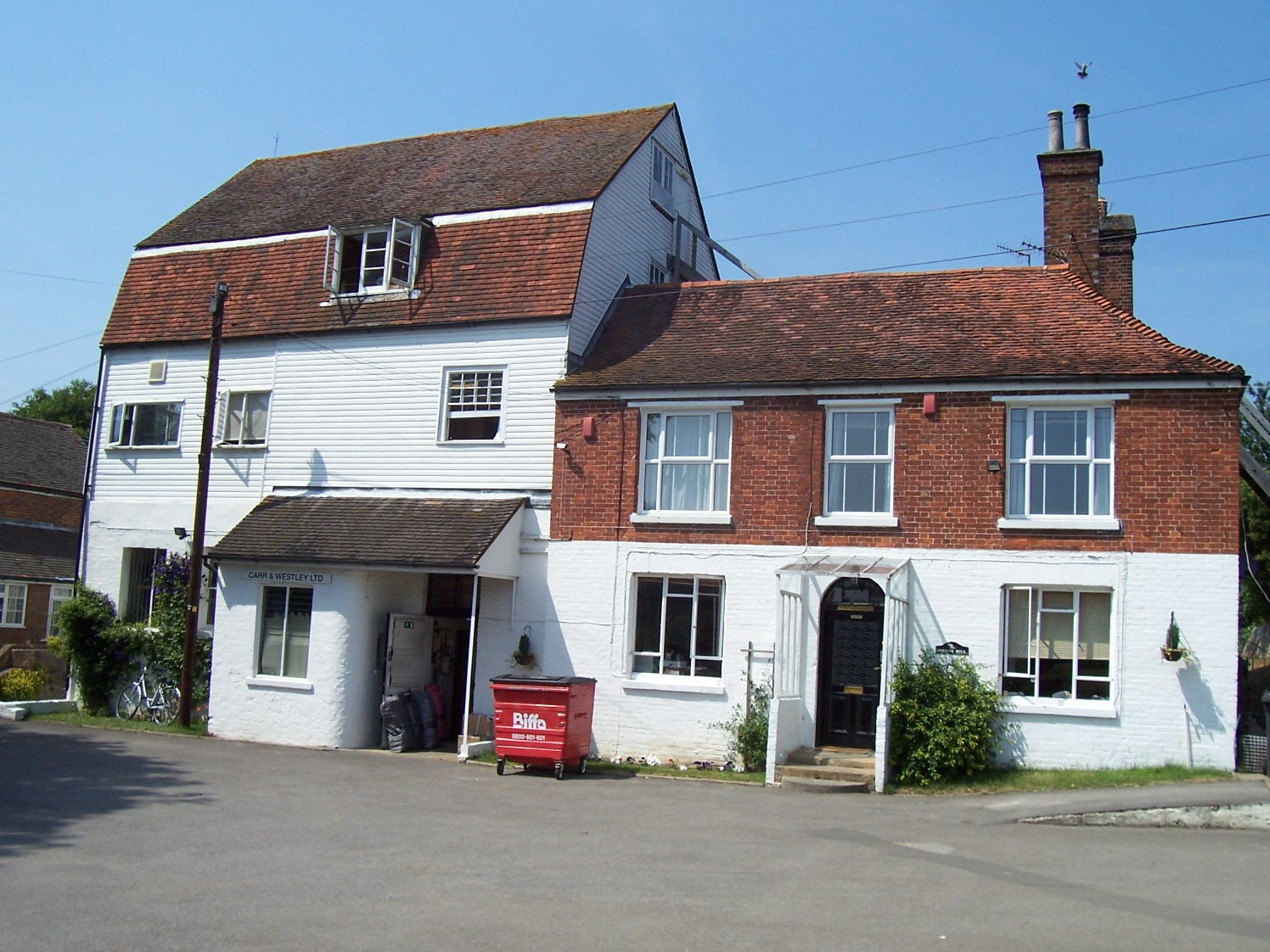
Bourne Mill, Hadlow

This may be a Domesday site, Haslow (Hadlow) being assessed as having 2 mills. The mill still stands, and had a large external high breast shot waterwheel. The millpond was about 15 yards (14 m) by 30 yards (27 m), or 450 square yards (380 m^{2}) in area. Apart from the cast iron wheel axle and wooden upright shaft, The cast iron pit wheel survives. The crown wheel was of compass arm construction. The mill was working until 1947, millers in the latter days being John Thirsk (there in 1931) and Thomas Lambert before him. A Mr. Carr took over the mill in 1947 and established a small clothing factory, still trading today as Carr & Westley Ltd. The mill was also known as Hope Mill, being part of Hope Farm.

=== Goldhill (Bourneside, Victoria) Mill, Golden Green ===
TQ 636 484 51°12′41″N 0°20′36″E

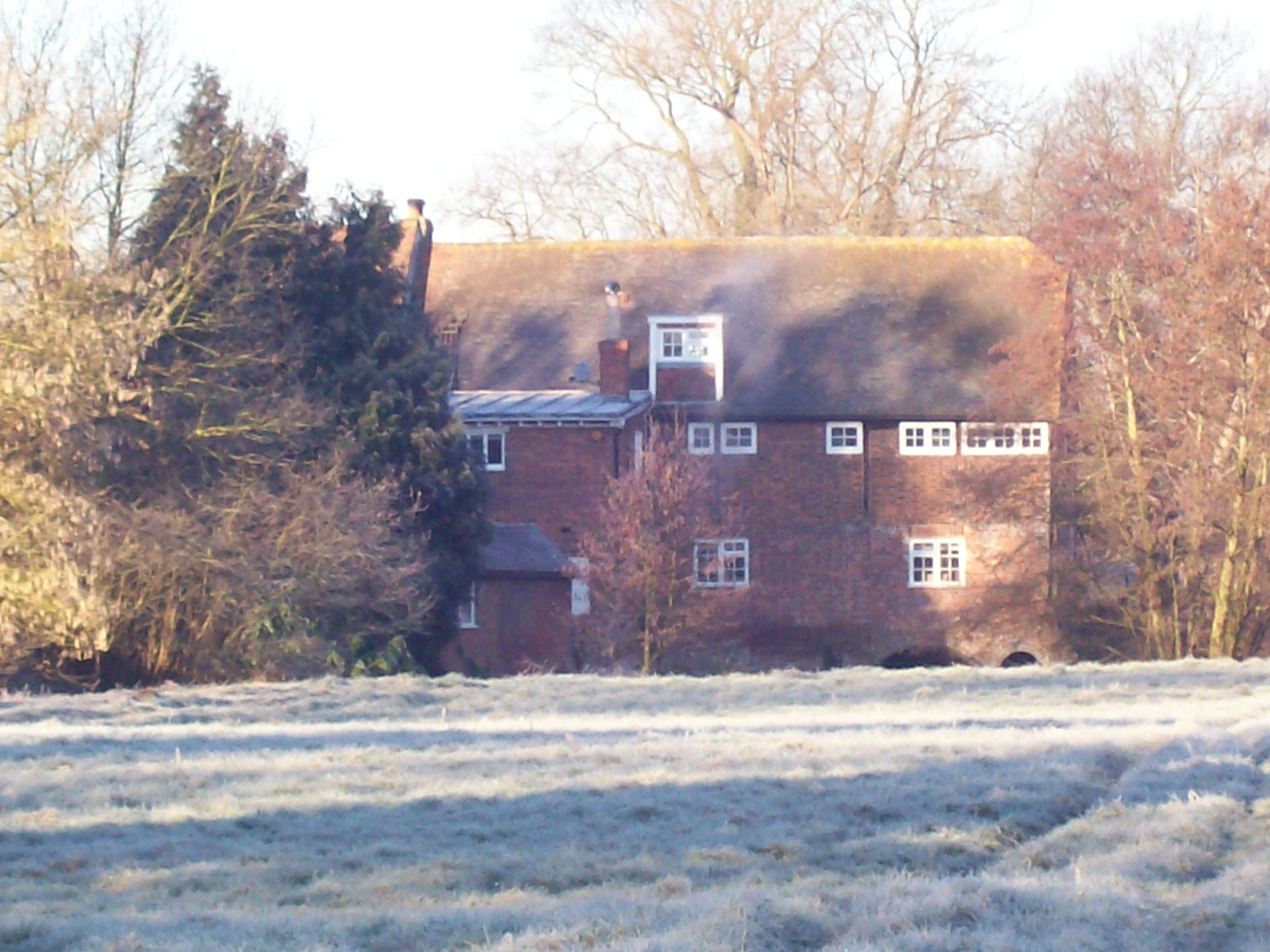
Goldhill Mill

Golden Green is a hamlet within Hadlow parish. A mill may have been on this site since Domesday. This Grade II listed mill is the only mill on the Bourne to retain most of its milling machinery. The internal waterwheel is of iron, and is breast shot. It is 14 feet (4.27 m) diameter and 7 feet (2.13 m) wide. on a cast iron axle. The pit wheel is 10 feet (3.05 m) diameter and has 120 cogs, driving a 2 feet 6 inches (760 mm) diameter wallower with 35 teeth on a 17 inches (430 mm) diameter wooden upright shaft. The Great Spur Wheel is 6 feet 8 inches (2.03 m) diameter and has 92 cogs. The date 1848 is on a plinth at the bottom of the Upright shaft, and may indicate the date of the existing waterwheel and machinery. The crown wheel was used latterly to drive the electricity generator, with one of the stone nuts being adapted as the driven gear. The mill had two pairs of millstones and last ground corn c.1920. The sack hoist does not survive. In the early-mid 20th century, the mill was used to generate electricity, but the apparatus has now been removed. The mill was also known as Bourneside Mill and Victoria Mill (Victoria Road is downstream of the mill). The outbuildings around the mill have been converted into holiday cottages.

=== Pierce Mill, Golden Green ===
TQ 646 484 approx 51°12′40″N 0°21′27″E

Little is known of this mill, but it is commemorated today by Pierce Mill Lane. The mill was named after the millers, the Pierce family.

=== Little Mill, East Peckham ===
TQ 657 482 51°12′32″N 0°22′24″E

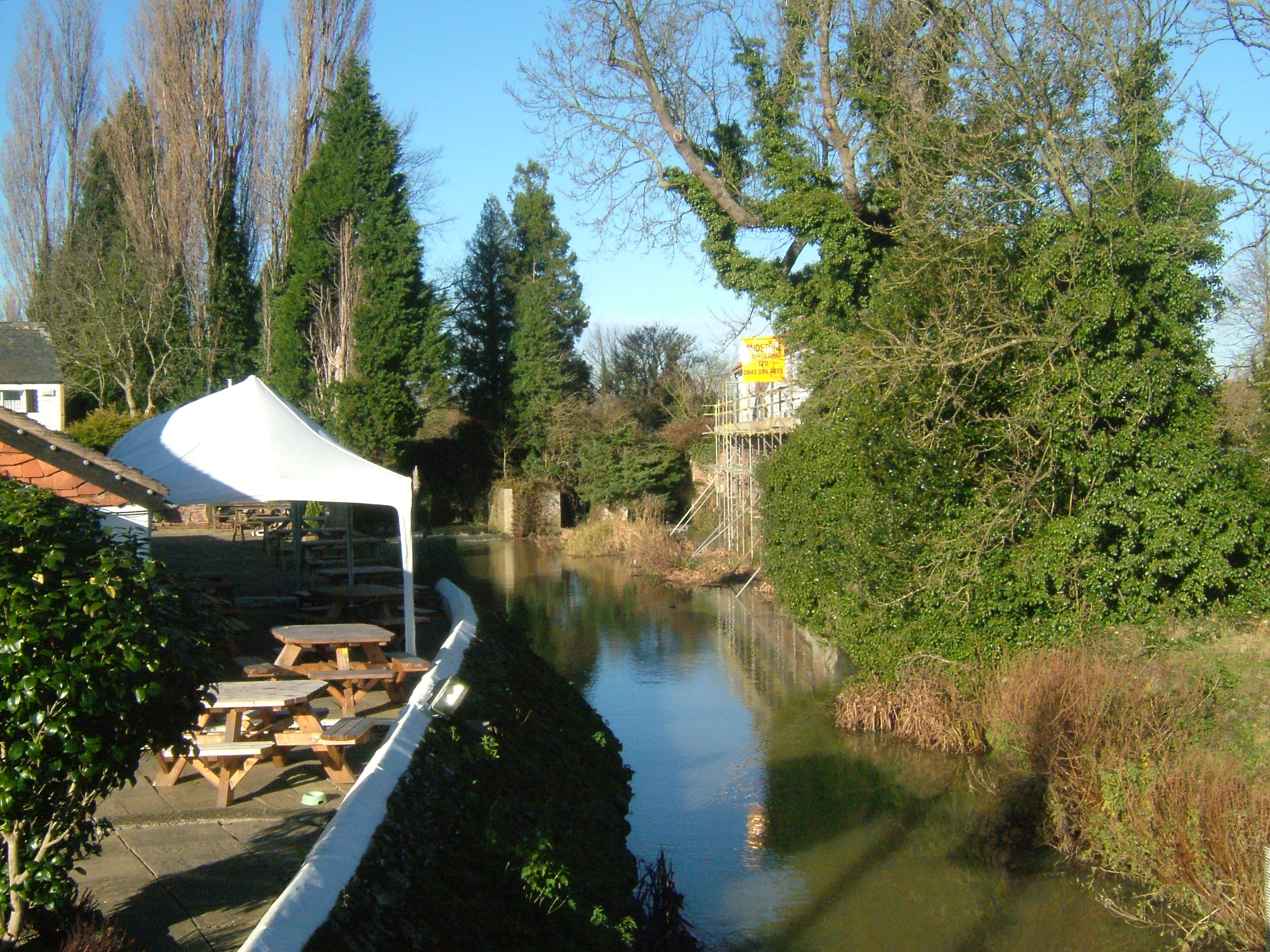
On the left are the gardens of the Man of Kent Pub, to the right the site of Little Mill

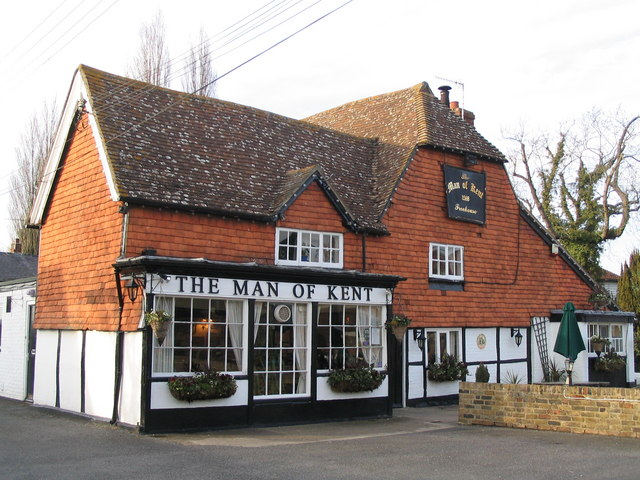
The 16th century Man of Kent public house, on the opposite bank to Little Mill.

This mill still stands, part of the building now being house converted, part demolished. The waterwheel was breastshot.

== Tributaries ==
A tributary of the Bourne rises in the Hildenborough parish and flows through Shipbourne where it powered a watermill, Uridge's Mill, Shipbourne (corn) and a pump at Claygate before flowing into the Bourne downstream of Hamptons Paper Mill.

A tributary of this tributary drove a water powered sawmill at Fairlawne Home Farm, Shipbourne.

A tributary enters the Bourne at Basted Paper Mills. It may have powered a watermill in Crouch (Platt parish).

== Mills on the tributaries ==
=== Uridge's Mill, Shipbourne ===
This mill was named after the miller, Robert Uridge, who worked the mill for sixteen years during the 1870s and 1880s. The exact location is not known. The mill may have gone by the name Puttenden Mill, but this could also have been Hamptons Paper Mill.

=== Claygate pump, Shipbourne ===
TQ 605 517 approx 51°14′30″N 0°18′01″E

This was a breast shot wheel driving a pump again the exact location is not known.

=== Fairlawne Saw Mill, Plaxtol ===
An estate saw mill, driven by a breast shot mill was located at Fairlawne Home Farm.

=== Crouch Mill, Platt ===
There may have been a watermill at Salmons Farm, Crouch. The only reference to it being the Wrotham Tithe Award of 1845 noting a hop garden of 2 acres (8,100 m^{2}) and 35 perches "adjoining mill."

== Wildlife ==
Chubb can be seen in the river at Little Mill, and Crayfish can be found at Ightham. Brown trout can be seen at Goldhill Mill, Golden Green.

== Navigation ==
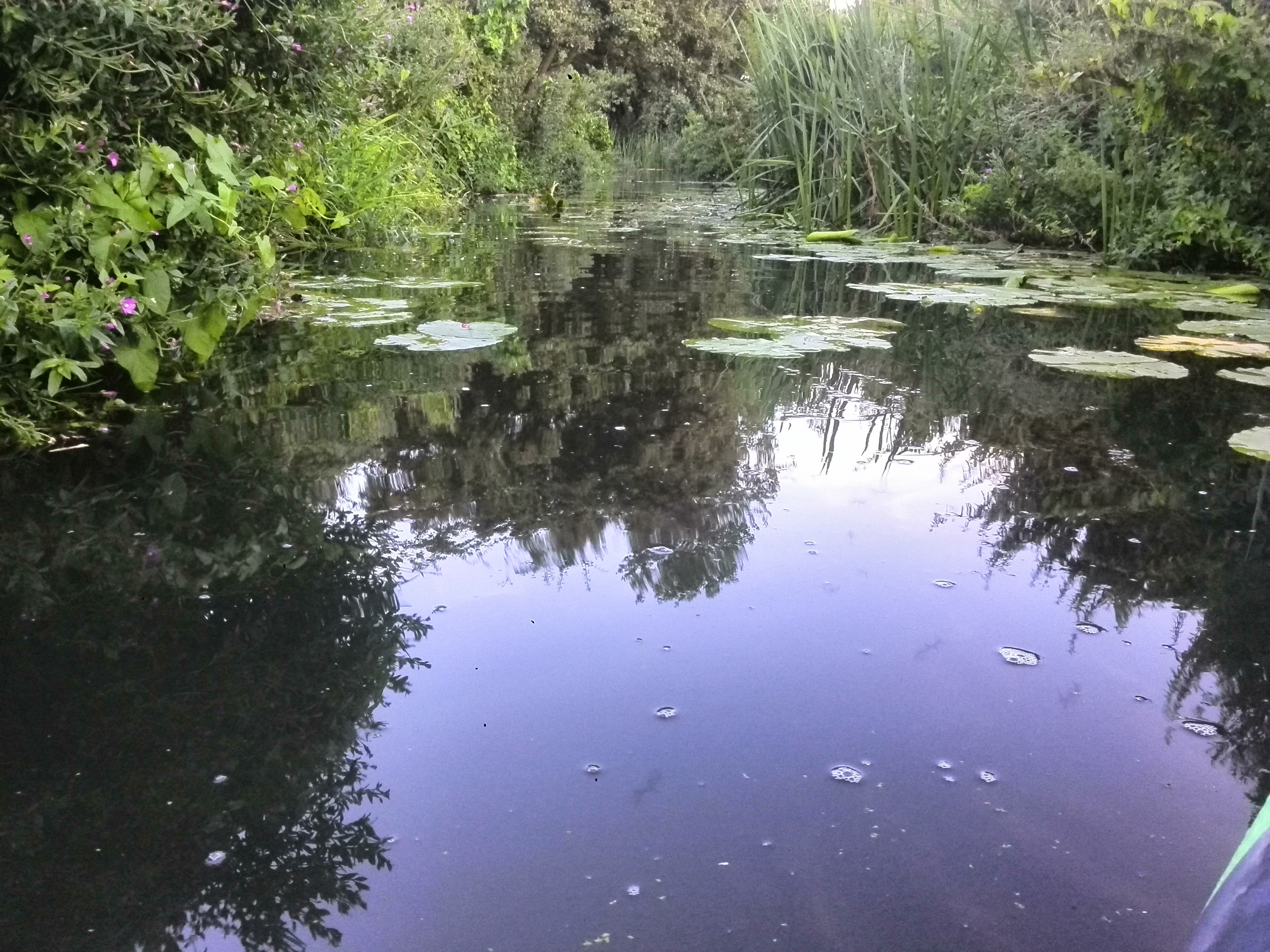
open water navigation 2014

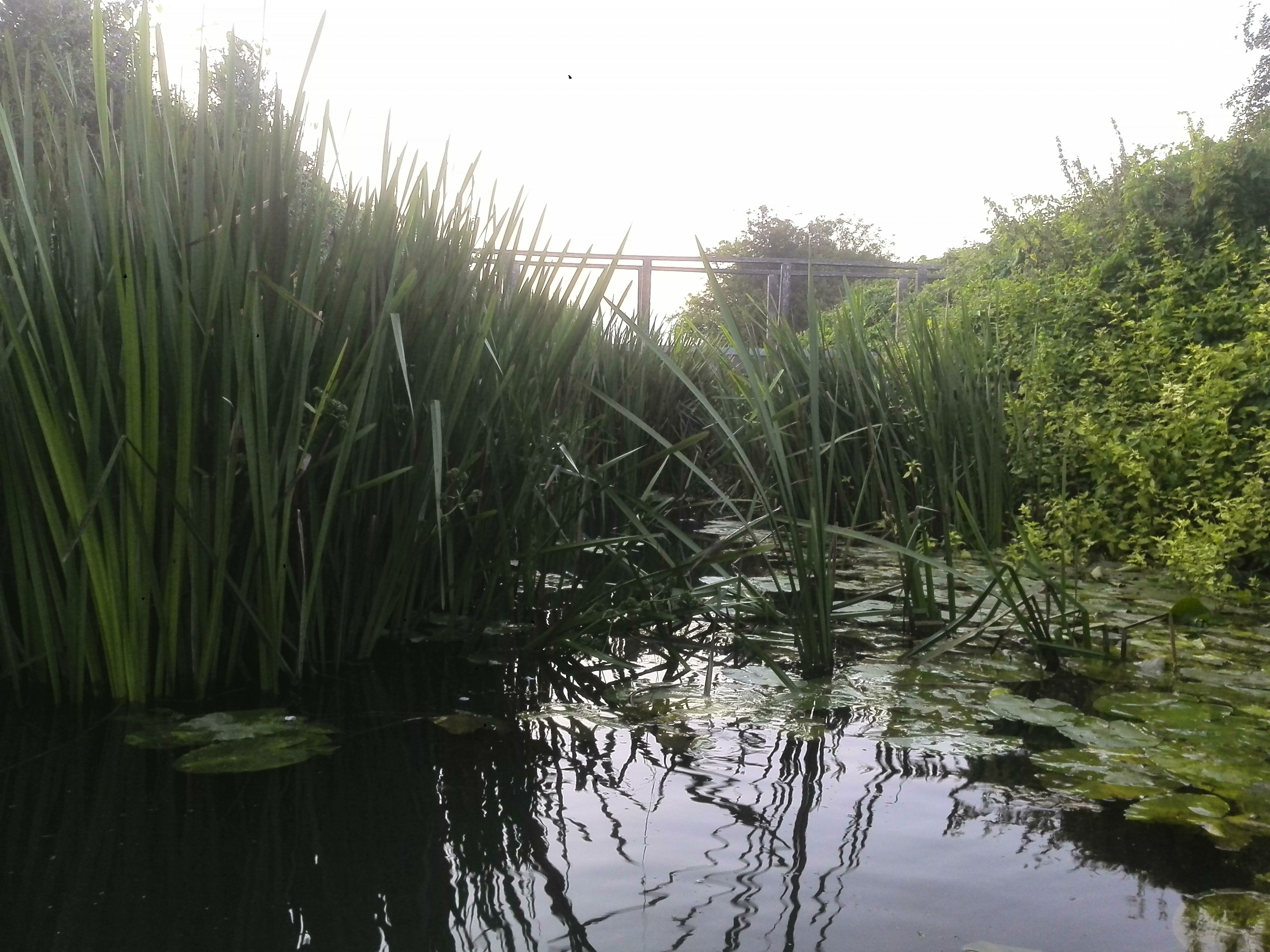
navigation blocked after 200 m by vegetation, summer 2014

The Bourne was navigable from The Medway, by canoe, summer 2014, in open water, for 200 m until clogged by vegetation under the 1st footpath bridge; 500 m before the 'Man of Kent' pub, East Peckham.

The river was reported navigable to the pub in winter (2012); 'the last 100 yards rocky and difficult'.

The lack of mills for the 800 m below Little Mill (now 'Man of Kent') may indicate that loads could once be carried to the Tonbridge Road at East Peckham. A large tannery, using the Bourne's water at Little Mill, is shown in the 1891 OS map. The river by the tannery, before the road bridge, is shown with a cut-out suited to mooring.

== Footpaths ==
The River Bourne is crossed by the Greensand Way long-distance path at Dunk's Green and the Wealdway long-distance path at Barnes Street. The Medway Valley Walk at Waggon Bridge, East Peckham marks the spot where the Bourne enters the Medway. Hadlow Parish Council have plotted a walk along the Bourne, from Ightham to the Medway.

The Ancient track, Pilgrims' Way passes through Yaldham. The Roman military route from Maidstone to London crosses the Bourne at Ightham.

== See also ==
- Medway watermills article
