= Edith Holt Whetham =

Edith Holt Whetham (27 December 1911 – 28 January 2001) was an English lecturer and agricultural economist.

== Early life ==
Edith Holt Whetham was born on 27 December 1911, the daughter of William Cecil Dampier Whetham, a Cambridge-educated scientist and agricultural academic, and his wife Catherine Durning Holt, a daughter of Liverpool merchant Robert Durning Holt who had also pursued an education at Cambridge. She had one brother and four sisters, including Margaret Anderson (indexer). Whetham's family owned a small manor house in Devon, and also inherited a small estate in Hilfield, Dorset where they spent family vacations.

Whetham suffered from hearing loss after a fall when she was an infant. She was educated at home and later at Downe House School near Newbury. In 1930, she enrolled in Newnham College, where her mother had studied. She took classes in economics, attending the lectures of John Maynard Keynes. Although she passed her degree examinations, it was not until 1998 that she was conferred with her full degree because she had studied at a time when Cambridge did not permit women to participate in graduation ceremonies.

== Career ==
Whetham began work as a resident scholar at the Ministry of Agriculture, where she was an agricultural economist. Three years later, she moved to the journal, The Economist. During World War II, she worked in the Ministry of Food and the Cabinet Office's civil history department.

Following the war, Whetham returned to Cambridge. She was a Fellow of Newnham College and held the Gilbey lecturership in History and Economics of Agriculture until 1963.

In 1952, Whetham published the book, British Farming 1939–1949, a major study of the change in farming practices in England. She resigned from Cambridge in 1963 and took up a position at Ahmadu Bello University in Zaria, Nigeria, as a visiting professor of economics, later becoming a full professor there. Her interests had moved to the agricultural needs and economies of the developing world.

Whetham's later publications, sometimes co-authored, included London Milk Trade 1900–1930 (1960), A History of British Agriculture (1846–1914) (1964), Cooperation, Land Reform, and Land Settlement: Report on a Survey in Kenya, Uganda, Sudan, Ghana, Nigeria and Iran (1968), The Economics of African Countries (1969), Agricultural Marketing in Africa (1972) and Beef, Cattle and Sheep 1910–1940 (1976). She single-handedly wrote the eighth volume of the Cambridge University Press series The Agrarian History of England and Wales (1978).

In 1966, Whetham was appointed to the executive of the Agricultural Economics Society and in 1971 she was elected as its president. She also held various posts with the British Agricultural History Society and served as its president for a period until 1979.

Whetham died on 28 January 2001 in Cambridge.
