= John Dudlow =

English lawyer and cricketer

John Noble Dudlow (28 July 1796 – 11 August 1879) was an English lawyer who played in one first-class cricket match for a Kent XI in 1841.

Dudlow was born at West Malling in Kent, the son of John and Frances Dudlow. His father was a lawyer who served as the coroner for West Kent. Dudlow followed his father into the legal profession and was an articled clerk for him in 1812. He later also served as the coroner for West Kent and in 1868 had the distinction of presiding over the inquest of the first executed prisoner following the abolition of public executions.

Dudlow played club cricket regularly for Town Malling throughout the 1830s, often opening the batting. He was described as an "elegant long stop". He was named in the Kent team in a single first-class match in 1841, against Nottinghamshire but does not appear to have arrived at the ground at all during the match. He neither fielded nor bowled in the game, and is recorded as having been absent hurt in both Kent innings.

Dudlow married Sophia Douce; the couple had two daughters. He died at West Malling whilst in office as West Kent coroner, aged 83.

== Bibliography ==
- Carlaw, Derek (2020). Kent County Cricketers, A to Z: Part One (1806–1914) (PDF). Cardiff: ACS.
