= Ada, the National College for Digital Skills =

Location
- 1 Sutherland Street; London, SW1V 4LD
- 51.48931°N 0.14712°W

Information
- Motto: Think. Create. Develop.
- Established: 2016
- Founder: Mark Smith and Tom Fogden
- Authority: City Of Westminster
- Chair: Chris Cherry
- Principal: Sarah Salimullah
- Key people: Mark Campbell, Lazaros Vastazos, Neelu Vasishth
- Enrollment: 182 (2024)
- School fees: free
- Website: www.ada.ac.uk
- Last updated: 04/07/2024

Ada, the National College for Digital Skills is a specialist further education college and has campuses in Manchester and London, England. At the London Sixth Form college every 16-19year old student takes Computer Science and all of Ada's diverse Higher Level and Degree Apprentices work in skills shortage disciplines in innovative, blue-chip companies. It is named after Ada Lovelace and opened in September 2016. Its curriculum is designed with input from founding industry partners such as Bank of America Merrill Lynch, Gamesys, IBM, Deloitte, and King. Their founding education partner is the Aldridge Foundation. The Board is chaired by Tiffany Hall. The College focuses on achieving three aims:

1. To be the centre of excellence for the teaching and learning of advanced digital skills
2. To offer students a viable, high-quality alternative to university
3. To be a beacon of best practice for employment-focused provision

== History ==
The Prime Minister announced the formation of Ada, the National College for Digital Skills, in 2014 in a move to open five new National Colleges in crucial industries. The National Colleges have a mission to work designing the curriculum with employers “to produce the skills needed now and into the future to ensure the UK remains innovative and at the forefront of pioneering industry.”

Ada was founded by Mark Smith and Tom Fogden, both of the inaugural Teach First cohort which aims to get talented teachers into classrooms in low income areas. Previously Smith assisted Lord Adonis writing his book Education, Education, Education.

Bank of America Merrill Lynch, Gamesys, Deloitte Digital, IBM, King and the Aldridge Foundation are the colleges founding partners. Capital Funding is supplied by BEIS, the GLA and Haringey Council.

Ada opened to its first cohort of students in 2016 and became the first brand new further education college in England since 1993. In 2023 Ada celebrated the move to two brand-new campuses: London Victoria and Manchester Ancoats.

By 2028 Ada will have educated 10,000 young people nationwide. Currently 38% of Ada's learners are female, 51% are from ethnic minority backgrounds and 50% come from low income households, compared to national averages of c. 20%.

== Recognition ==
Ada, in partnership with Bank of America, won an award for "Promoting Opportunity" through social mobility in May 2023.

Ada were honoured with the first ever "King's Award for Enterprise for Promoting Opportunity" (through social mobility). Ada were one of 148 organisations nationally to be recognised with the award. The achievement follows a partnership with Bank of America to deliver outreach and additional services which recruit and support young people from underrepresented groups into Ada's sixth form and Digital Degree Apprenticeship education programmes and onto careers in technology.

== Provision ==
Ada's Sixth Form first took students in September 2016. Each Ada student studies computer science as well as a range of A-levels. Ada's higher and degree level apprenticeship programmes began in 2017. Ada currently offers courses in Software Development, Data Analytics, Tech Consultancy, Cyber Security and Business Analysis with over 30 employers such as Salesforce, Google, Sainsbury's, Deloitte, EY and many more. A degree programme, validated by the Open University, sits at the core of Ada's programmes. In 2024 Cohort 7 of the Sixth Form achieved the best ever results.
