= William Cecil Dampier =

British scientist, agriculturist, and science historian

Sir William Cecil Dampier FRS (born William Cecil Dampier Whetham) (27 December 1867 – 11 December 1952) was a British scientist, agriculturist, and science historian who developed a method of extracting lactose (milk sugar) from whey.

He was born in London, the son of Charles Langley and Mary (née Dampier) Whetham and the grandson of Sir Charles Whetham, a former Lord Mayor of London. In 1886, he entered Trinity College, Cambridge and in 1889 commenced his varied researches in the Cavendish Laboratory. In 1891 was elected a Fellow of Trinity.

In June 1901, he was elected a Fellow of the Royal Society. His candidacy citation read: "Lecturer in Physics. Fellow of Trinity College, Cambridge".

Dampier was author of the following scientific papers, &c: - 'On the Alleged Slipping at the Boundary of a Liquid in Motion'; 'Note on Kohlrausch's Theory of Ionic Velocity'; 'Ionic Velocities'; 'On the velocity of the Hydrogen Ion through Solutions of Acetates'; 'On the Velocities of the Ions and the Relative Ionization Powers of Solvents'; 'The Velocity of the Ions'; 'The Ionizing Power of Solvents'; 'Report to the British Association on the Present State of our Knowledge in Electrolysis and Electro-Chemistry'; 'The Theory of the Migration of the ions and of Specific Ionic Velocities'; 'The Coagulative Power of Electrolytes'; 'The Ionization of Dilute Solutions at the Freezing Point' (a paper read before the Royal Society); an elementary text book on 'Solution and Electrolysis'; Letters and Articles in 'Nature' and 'Science Progress.'

In 1904, he published the first of his broader works on science and its history, The Recent Development of Physical Science. This was followed in 1929 by his frequently reprinted and translated A History of Science, and its Relations with Philosophy and Religion.A Shorter History of Science. 1944,1945.

From 1931 to 1935, he served as the first secretary of the Agricultural Research Council. He was knighted in 1931 for public service to agriculture.

== Family ==
On 10 December 1897, Dampier married Catherine Durning Holt, a daughter of Robert Durning Holt, of a Liverpool shipowning family. Catherine had studied for the natural science tripos at Newnham College, Cambridge, from 1889–92. She co-authored a dozen of his books on heredity and wrote her own book, Upbringing of Daughters (1917). They had one son and four daughters, including the economist Edith Holt Whetham.
