= Joan Thirsk =

Historian and cryptanalyst (1922–2013)

Joan Thirsk CBE, FBA, FRHistS
- Born: Irene Joan Watkins; 19 June 1922; St Pancras, London Borough of Camden
- Died: 3 October 2013 (aged 91); Tunbridge Wells, Kent
- Other name: Irene Joan Thirsk
- Education: Oxford University
- Occupations: Author, historian, academic, cryptanalyst

Irene Joan Thirsk (née Watkins; 19 June 1922 – 3 October 2013) was a British economic and social historian, specialising in the history of agriculture, and cryptanalyst. She was the leading British early modern agrarian historian of her era, as well as an important social and economic historian. Her work highlighted the regional differences in agricultural practices in England. She also had an interest in food history and local English history, in particular of Hadlow, Kent.

== Life ==
Joan Watkins was born on 19 June 1922 in St Pancras, London. Her father was the steward of a club in central London, and her mother had worked as a dressmaker. She studied at Primrose Hill Primary and Camden School, and pursued a university degree in German and French in 1941 at Westfield College. In 1942, she enrolled in the ATS, attached to the Intelligence Corps.

She was posted to Bletchley Park as an intelligence analyst, providing information that assisted Hut 6 in the breaking of the Enigma ciphers. The German messages they decrypted helped Allied forces reconstruct the location and strength of the German army throughout Europe. Her future husband Jimmy (30 May 1914 – 2 June 2018) worked alongside her in the Sixta traffic analysis group.

Jimmy and Joan married in September 1945 and moved to London, where Jimmy returned to his job as a librarian and Joan resumed her studies. Upon resuming, she changed her course at Westfield College from languages to history. When Jimmy retired in 1974, they moved first to Oxford, and then, on her retirement, to Hadlow in Kent.

Her academic career began with assistant lectureship in sociology at the London School of Economics. She was later senior research fellow at the University of Leicester from 1951 to 1965, and reader in economic history at Oxford University between 1965 and 1983. She was the editor of The Agrarian History of England and Wales (for volumes 4–6) from 1964 to 1972 and in 1974 was appointed general editor of the series.

She sat on the editorial board of Past & Present from 1956 to 1992, being the only woman until Olwen Hufton and Judith Herrin joined in 1978. She was appointed a Fellow of the British Academy (FBA) in 1974, elected to the American Philosophical Society in 1982, and made a Commander of the Order of the British Empire (CBE) in 1993. In 2017, she was featured in a conference, London's Women Historians, held at the Institute of Historical Research, to celebrate the contribution of women historians who had worked at the University of London and its colleges.

== Contribution to history ==
Early in her career, Thirsk focused her research on farming in Kesteven, in the south-western division of Lincolnshire. She noticed that each part of the district had its own agricultural dynamic, depending on whether its inhabitants farmed on clay, limestone, or the edge of the fen. This led her to approach agricultural history through the lens of geography, instead of relying on macroeconomic theories. This approach was consistent with a broad movement in which regional studies were increasingly welcomed in the field of history.

In 1952, she joined with H. P. R. Finberg in helping to found the Agricultural History Society, where she welcomed the contributions of folklorists, geographers and farmers. In 1964, she became the editor of the Agricultural History Review.

For her work in The Agrarian History of England and Wales, she used samples of probate inventories to map the local farming system in different regions of England, assisted by two researchers for two years (Alan Everitt and Margaret Midgley). She also noticed how cloth-making and hand-knitting in proto-industrialisation were more prevalent in regions where pastoralism played an important part (North Wiltshire, South Suffolk or West Yorkshire).

In her Ford Lectures in 1975, published in 1978, she studied the history of important household objects which had been overlooked by her male peers, such as starch, needles, pins, cooking pots, kettles, frying pans, lace, soap, vinegar and stockings. She set out to understand how these products were manufactured and marketed, what this revealed about economic innovation, how it impacted employment and productivity, and its subsequent influence on family and national incomes. In 1978, she delivered an influential Stenton lecture on the role of horses in pre-industrial English society, which was cited by Daniel Roche as an important source for his work on the same subject in French history.

Towards the end of her life, she expanded on the inequalities that women historians face in a male-dominated field, by noting that they are more likely to be assigned to tedious and scholarly tasks which benefit other researchers, but rarely their own career. She also noted that women historians have been prominent in new academic endeavours, but that once these ventures were established, men inevitably came to control these fields. Maxine Berg also noted this trend in economic history.

== Food history ==
Although best known for her agrarian history, Thirsk also had a strong interest in food history, especially in her later years. In 1995 she gave a paper on preserving food to the Leeds Symposium on the History of Food which was subsequently published. She advised on the curation of an exhibition: Fooles and Fricasees: Food in Shakespeare's England at the Folger Shakespeare Library in 1999, contributing an essay: Food in Shakespeare's England to the catalogue.

Her book Alternative Agriculture explores how overlooked cultures like flax, hemp, rapeseed, and woad were cultivated in early modern England. Her last major work Food in Early Modern England Phases, Fads, Fashions 1500–1760. surveys the history of English food chronologically, trying to explore differences in social classes. The author tries to dispel the idea that food of that era was dull and monotonous, as there was a wide range of herbs, plants, and animals eaten at that are no longer available today. The gathering and making of food was discussed and appreciated in all levels of society. Her own experience making and tasting barley bread (a staple food of in sixteenth-century Southern England), showed her how difficult it was to make and hard to eat.

== Works ==
- Food in Early Modern England. Continuum. 2007. ISBN 978-1852855383.
- Hadlow: Life, Land and People in a Wealden Parish 1460–1600. Maidstone: Kent Archaeological Society. 2007. ISBN 978-0-906746-70-7. (editor)
- Alternative Agriculture: A History (1997) Oxford University Press
- The English Rural Landscape. Oxford: Oxford University Press. 2000. ISBN 978-0198662198.
- Agricultural Regions and Agrarian History in England, 1500–1750. Palgrave. 1987. ISBN 978-0333191583.
- Hadlow Castle: a Short History. Hadlow: Hadlow Historical Society. 1985. ISBN 0-9510425-0-5.
- The Agrarian History of England and Wales, volume V: 1640–1750 (1985, as editor)
- Economic Policy and Projects: Development of a Consumer Society in Early Modern England. Oxford:The Clarendon Press. 1978. ISBN 978-0-19-828274-7.
- English Peasant Farming. Methuen. 1978.
- Family and Inheritance: Rural Society in Western Europe, 1200–1800. Cambridge University Press. 1978. ISBN 978-0521293549. (co-editor)
- Horses in Early Modern England. For Service, for Pleasure, for Power. Reading: University of Reading. 1972.
- The Agrarian History of England and Wales, Volume IV: 1500–1640 (1967, as editor)
- English Peasant Farming. Methuen. 1957.

== See also ==
- Past & Present
- Richard Henry Tawney
