= John Alcote =

English politician

John Alcote (fl. 1400–1417) was an English politician. He sat as MP for Rochester in 1410.
