= William Bodkin =

William Bodkin may refer to:

- Sir William Bodkin (judge) (1791–1874), British judge and Conservative Party politician
- Sir William Bodkin (New Zealand politician) (1885–1964), New Zealand politician of the United Party, and from 1935, the National Party
