= Chowne =

Chowne is a surname. Notable people with the surname include:

- Albert Chowne (1920–1945), Australian army officer
- Charles Tilson-Chowne (born 1881), British actor
- George Chowne, English politician
- Henry Chowne (c. 1613–1668), English politician

== See also ==
- chown, a computer command
