= Francis Villiers =

Francis Villiers may refer to:

- Francis Child Villiers (1819–1862), British politician
- Francis Hyde Villiers (1852–1925), British civil servant and diplomat
