= John Bosom =

John Bosom may refer to:

- John Bosom (died 1440), MP for Totnes and Dartmouth
- John Bosom (MP for Rochester) in 1407
