= Thomas Madox (disambiguation) =

Thomas Madox was a historian.

== See also ==
- Tommy Maddox, American football player
- Tom Maddox, American science fiction writer
- Thomas Herbert Maddock, English MP
