= Rochester by-election =

Rochester by-election may refer to:

- 1878 Rochester by-election
- 1903 Rochester by-election
- 2014 Rochester and Strood by-election
