= John Clerke =

English politician (born 1618)

- Born: 1618
- Died: not specified
- Education: University College, Oxford
- Occupation: politician
- Known for: MP, House of Commons (1640)
- Parents: Henry Clerke (MP) (father); Grace Morgan (mother)
- Relatives: Francis, brother (MP)

John Clerke (born 1618) was an English politician who sat in the House of Commons in 1640.

Clerke was the son of Henry Clerke of Rochester, Kent and his wife Grace Morgan, daughter of George Morgan of Crow Lane House Rochester. His father was a lawyer and MP for Rochester. He matriculated at University College, Oxford aged 16 on 16 September 1634.

In April 1640, Clerke was elected Member of Parliament for Rochester in the Short Parliament. Clerke's brother Francis was also MP for Rochester.

Parliament of England
Vacant Parliament suspended since 1629	Member of Parliament for Rochester; 1640; With: Sir Thomas Walsingham	Succeeded by Sir Thomas Walsingham; Richard Lee
