= John Mills (Hampshire cricketer) =

British soldier, politician and amateur cricketer

Member of Parliament for Rochester
- In office 1831–1835 Serving with Ralph Bernal
- Preceded by: Ralph Bernal; Lord Villiers
- Succeeded by: Ralph Bernal; Thomas Twisden Hodges

Personal details
- Born: 11 August 1789
- Died: 18 February 1871 (aged 81)
- Spouse: Sarah Charlotte Micklethwait (m. 1835; died 1869)
- Relations: Sir Charles Mills, 1st Baronet (brother); Charles Mills (uncle); Charles Mills, 1st Baron Hillingdon (nephew)
- Parent(s): William Mills; Elizabeth Digby
- Education: Harrow School
- Alma mater: Christ Church, Oxford

John Mills (11 August 1789 – 18 February 1871) was a British soldier, politician and amateur cricketer who played from 1816 to 1820.

== Early life ==
He was the eldest son of William Mills, a director of the Honourable East India Company, and the elder brother of Sir Charles Mills, 1st Baronet.

Mills was educated at Harrow and Christ Church, Oxford, matriculating on 22 October 1807.

== Career ==
He was commissioned an ensign in the Coldstream Guards on 27 December 1809. Mainly associated with Hampshire, he made 9 known appearances. He played for the Gentlemen in the Gentlemen v Players series. Mills served with the regiment during the Peninsular War and in Holland. He was promoted lieutenant and captain on 10 January 1814.

Mills was later appointed a verderer of the New Forest. He was elected as a Tory (and later Conservative) Member of Parliament (MP) for Rochester at the 1831 general election having contested the seat unsuccessfully in 1830. He was re-elected in 1832, and held the seat until he stood down at the 1835 general election. He was High Sheriff of Hampshire in 1839, and was appointed a deputy lieutenant in 1846.

== Personal life ==
On 28 July 1835, Mills married Sarah Charlotte Micklethwait (1813–1869), a daughter of Nathaniel Micklethwait and Lady Charlotte Marianne Harriet Rous (daughter of the 1st Earl of Stradbroke). Together, they were the parents of:

- John Mills (1836–1899), who married Louisa Frances Entwisle, daughter of Thomas Entwisle, in 1868.
- Cecil Mills (1839–1908), a Reverend who married Anne Henrietta Frances Nicolls, daughter of Francis H. G. Nicolls, in 1874.
- Francis Nathaniel Mills (1845–1848), who died young.

He died in 1871 at his estate of Bisterne.

=== Descendants ===
Through his second son, he was a grandfather of John Mills, MP for New Forest and Christchurch.

Parliament of the United Kingdom
Preceded by Ralph Bernal; Lord Villiers	Member of Parliament for Rochester; 1831 – 1835; With: Ralph Bernal	Succeeded by Ralph Bernal; Thomas Twisden Hodges
Honorary titles
Preceded by Andrew Robert Drummond	High Sheriff of Hampshire; 1839	Succeeded by John Meggott Elwes
