= Robert Kela =

English politician

Robert Kela (died ?1461) was an English politician who sat as MP for Rochester in 1419. He possibly married Joan and possibly died in 1461.
