= Edmund Page =

16th-century English politician

Edmund Page (by 1512 – 1551), of Shorne, Kent, was an English politician.

He was a member of parliament (MP) for Rochester in 1529.
