= John Fleming (14th-century MP) =

English politician

John Fleming (fl. 1373–1386), of Rochester, Kent, was an English politician.

== Early life ==
Nothing is known of Fleming's family or education.

== Career ==
Fleming was a member of parliament for the constituency of Rochester, Kent in 1373 and 1386.
