= William Brooke (MP, died 1597) =

William Brooke alias Cobham (1565-1597), of Cobham Hall; later of Newington, Kent, was an English Member of Parliament (MP).

He was a Member of the Parliament of England for Rochester in 1584 and 1586 and for Kent in 1587.
