= Philip Wykeham Martin =

British Liberal MP (1829-1878)

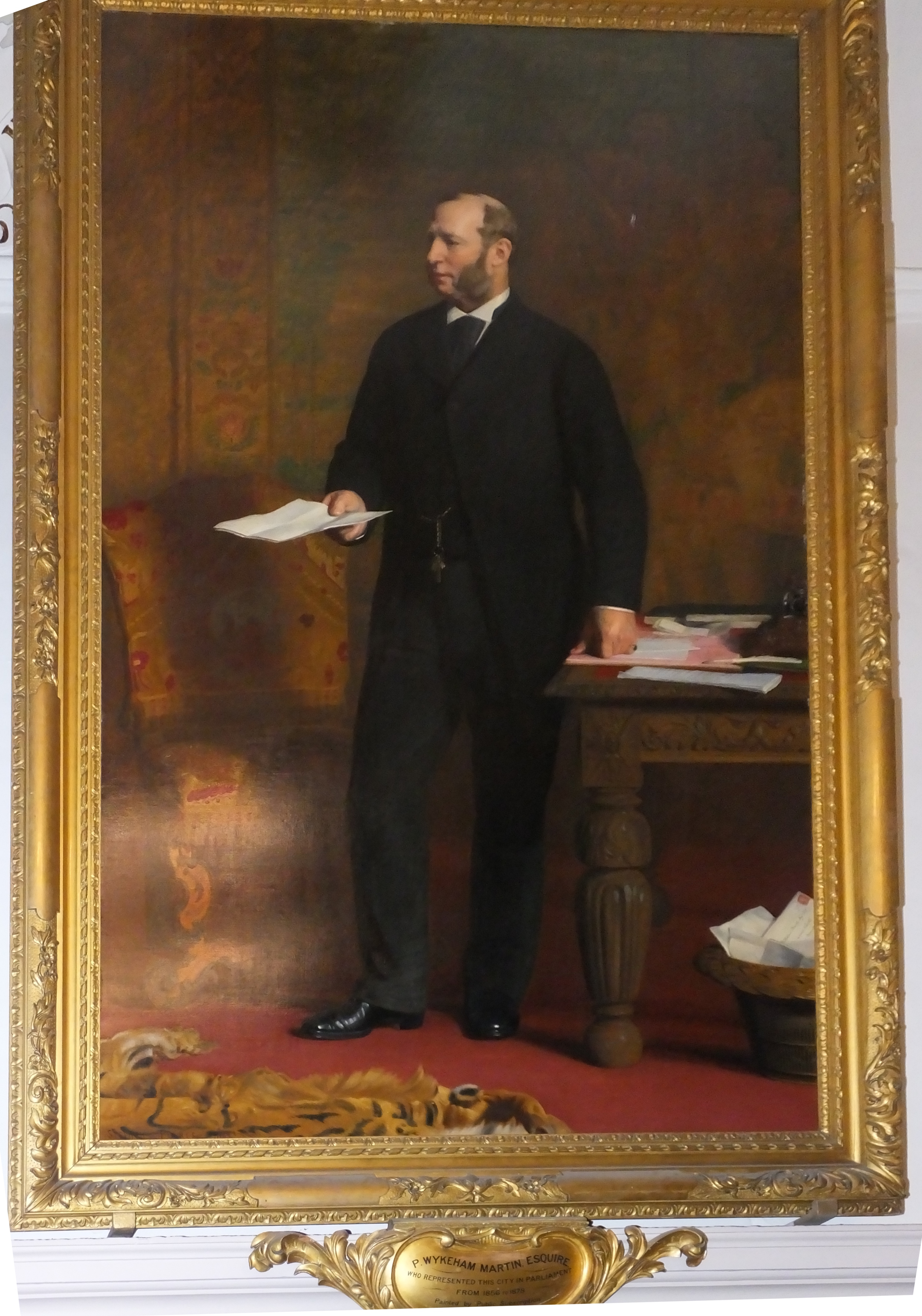
- 1880 portrait of Wykeham-Martin

MP for Rochester
- In office 1856–1878

Personal details
- Born: 18 January 1829
- Died: 31 May 1878 (aged 49)
- Spouse: Elizabeth Warde

Philip Wykeham-Martin (18 January 1829 – 31 May 1878) was an English Liberal politician who sat in the House of Commons from 1856 to 1878.

== Early life ==
Martin was the son of Charles Wykeham-Martin of Leeds Castle and his wife Lady Jemima Isabella Cornwallis (daughter of James Mann, 5th Earl Cornwallis). His father was a Member of Parliament (MP) for Newport. Martin was educated at Eton College and at Balliol College, Oxford graduating BA in 1850. He was a J.P. for Warwickshire, and a captain in the Warwickshire Yeomanry Cavalry.

== Political career ==
In February 1856 Martin was elected at a by-election as an MP for the borough of Rochester in Kent. He held the seat until his death aged 49 in 1878. In parliament he introduced and carried the "Sale of Spirits Amendment Act" and the "Hotel Keepers' Liability Act".

Martin died in the House of Commons Library on 31 May 1878; the House adjourned upon learning the news.

== Family ==
Martin married Elizabeth Warde (daughter of John Warde) in 1850. They had a son Cornwallis Philip Martin.

Parliament of the United Kingdom
Preceded by Francis Child Villiers; Sir Thomas Maddock	Member of Parliament for Rochester; 1856 – 1878; With: Sir Thomas Maddock to 1857; John Alexander Kinglake 1857–70; Julian Goldsmid from 1870	Succeeded by Arthur Otway; Julian Goldsmid
