= George Catelyn =

16th-century English politician

George Catelyn was an English politician who sat in the House of Commons between 1571 and 1581.

Catelyn was elected Member of Parliament (MP) for Rochester, Kent in 1571 and held the position until 1581.

Catelyn lived at a moated manor house at Bradbourne near East Malling, Kent. He was connected to the Twysden family through his wife and mother who were both Roydons. He had no heir and sold the property to Richard Manningham.

Parliament of England
Preceded by Edward Baeshe; Richard Watts	Member of Parliament for Rochester; 1571–1581; With: William Halstock 1571; Samuel Cox 1572–1581	Succeeded by William Cobham; George Bing
