= Thomas Walsingham (died 1669) =

English politician

Sir Thomas Walsingham (c. 1589 - April 1669) was an English politician who sat in the House of Commons at various times between 1614 and 1640. He supported the Parliamentarian side in the English Civil War.

== Life ==
Walsingham was the son of Thomas Walsingham (literary patron) and his wife Lady Audrey Shelton. He was knighted at Royston on 26 November 1613. In 1614 he was elected Member of Parliament for Poole. He was elected MP for Rochester in 1621 and again in 1628 and held the seat until 1629 when King Charles I decided to rule without parliament for eleven years. He was made vice-admiral of Kent in 1627.

In April 1640, Walsingham was re-elected MP for Rochester for the Short Parliament and again in November 1640 for the Long Parliament when he sat until 1653, surviving Pride's Purge. He sold the family property of Scadbury in around 1655.

Walsingham died in 1669 and was buried at Chislehurst on 10 April 1669.

== Family ==
Walsingham married twice, his first wife being Elizabeth Manwood, daughter of Sir Peter Manwood, who died giving birth to a daughter in January 1616.

Parliament of England
Preceded by Thomas Robarts; Edward Man	Member of Parliament for Poole; 1614; With: Sir Walter Erle	Succeeded by George Horsey; Sir Walter Erle
Preceded by Sir Edwin Sandys; Sir Edward Hoby	Member of Parliament for Rochester; 1620–1629; With: Henry Clerke 1620-1624; Maximilian Dallison 1624; Henry Clerke 1625-1629	Parliament suspended until 1640
Parliament suspended since 1629	Member of Parliament for Rochester; 1640–1653; With: John Clerke 1640; Richard Lee 1640–1648	Rochester not represented in Barebones Parliament
