= Thomas White (MP for Rochester) =

English politician

Thomas White (fl. 1374–1397) was an English politician. He sat as MP for Rochester in 1378 and September 1388.

He also served as acting constable of Rochester Castle sometime before 29 January 1384.

Before January 1383, he married Desiderata and they had one son, Richard.
