= 1878 Rochester by-election =

UK Parliamentary by-election

The 1878 Rochester by-election was fought on 14 June 1878. The by-election was fought due to the death of the incumbent Liberal MP, Philip Wykeham Martin. It was won by the Liberal candidate Arthur Otway.
