= Roger Leigh =

English politician

Roger Leigh (27 April 1840 – 29 February 1924) was an English Conservative politician who sat in the House of Commons from 1880 to 1885.

Leigh was the son of Thomas Yates and adopted son of Sir Robert Holt Leigh, 1st Baronet of Barham Court, Maidstone and Hindley Hall, Wigan. He was educated at Radley College and graduated at Christ Church, Oxford and Trinity College, Cambridge. He was admitted at Lincoln's Inn in 1865. In 1867, he succeeded to Barham Court and Hindley Hall. He was Lord of the Manor of Orrell, Lancashire and J.P. for Lancashire and Kent.

At the 1880 general election Leigh was elected member of parliament for Rochester. He held the seat until 1885.

Leigh died at Bath at the age of 83.

Leigh married firstly in 1861, Elizabeth Jane Blackwell, daughter of Captain Thomas Eden Blackwell of the Argyllshire Highlanders, and had issue. He married secondly in 1885, Agatha Elizabeth Shaw, daughter of Alfred Shaw.

Parliament of the United Kingdom
Preceded by Julian Goldsmid; Sir Arthur Otway	Member of Parliament for Rochester; 1880 – 1885; With: Sir Arthur Otway	Succeeded by Francis Hughes-Hallett
