= Peter Pope (MP) =

English politician

Peter Pope (fl. 1386), of Strood, Kent, was an English politician.

Pope was a Member of Parliament for the constituency of Rochester, Kent in 1386.
