= Julian Goldsmid =

British politician (1838–1896)

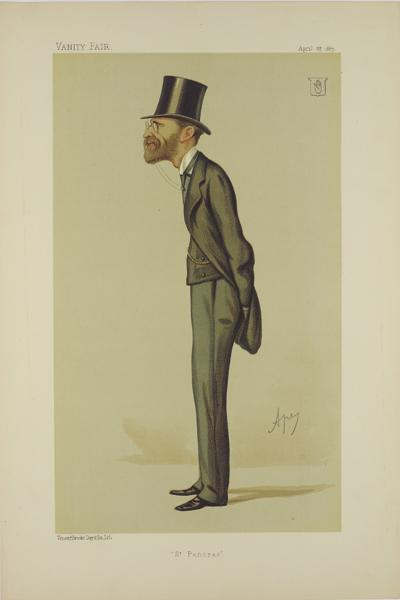
- "St Pancras". Caricature by Ape published in Vanity Fair in 1887.

Member of Parliament for Honiton
- In office 1866–1888 Serving with Alexander Baillie-Cochrane
- Preceded by: Frederick Goldsmid; Alexander Baillie-Cochrane
- Succeeded by: Abolished

Member of Parliament for Rochester
- In office 1870–1880 Serving with Philip Wykeham Martin 1870–1878; Sir Arthur Otway, Bt 1878–1880
- Preceded by: Philip Wykeham Martin; John Alexander Kinglake
- Succeeded by: Sir Arthur Otway, Bt; Roger Leigh

Member of Parliament for St Pancras South
- In office 1885–1896
- Preceded by: None
- Succeeded by: Herbert Jessel

Sir Julian Goldsmid, 3rd Baronet, DL, JP (8 October 1838 – 7 January 1896) was a British lawyer, businessman and Liberal (later Liberal Unionist) politician who sat in the House of Commons between 1866 and 1896.

== Background and early life ==
Goldsmid was the son of Frederick Goldsmid and his wife Caroline Samuel. His father was a banker and Member of Parliament for Honiton. Goldsmid was educated privately until he entered University College, London. In 1864 he became a fellow of University College, and was also called to the bar. After a brief period on the Oxford circuit, he gave up practising law when he was elected to parliament.

== Career ==
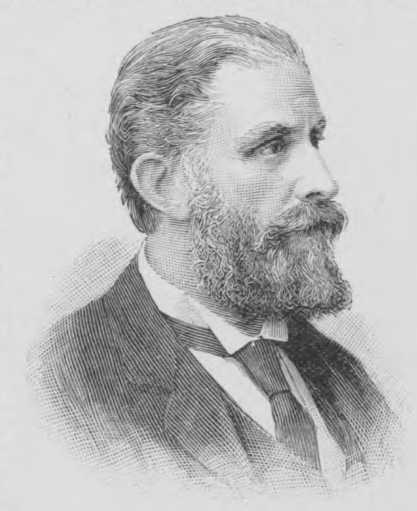

Goldsmid first stood for Parliament at a by-election in February 1864 for the borough of Brighton, without success, and he was defeated again at the 1865 general election, when he contested Cirencester. He was elected unopposed as Member of Parliament (MP) for Honiton at a by-election in March 1866. In that year, Goldsmid inherited Somerhill House near Tonbridge, Kent, on the death of his father. Honiton was disfranchised in 1868 by the Reform Act 1867 and at the 1868 general election Goldsmid stood unsuccessfully for Mid Surrey. He was elected for Rochester at a by-election in 1870 and held the seat until his defeat at the 1880 general election. In 1879, Goldsmid began expanding Somerhill to accommodate his large family; he had eight daughters. The work took until 1897 to complete.

He then contested a by-election in May 1880 for Sandwich, and was returned to the Commons after a five-year absence at the 1885 general election as MP for St Pancras South, holding that seat until his death in 1896. In 1894 Goldsmid was deputy Speaker of the House of Commons.

In 1878 Goldsmid succeeded his uncle, Sir Francis Goldsmid to the baronetcy and to the estate of Whiteknights Park at Earley in Berkshire, as well as others in Sussex, Kent and elsewhere. He also bore the Portuguese title of Baron de Goldsmid e da Palmeira. His business interests included being chairman of the Submarine Telegraph Company and the Imperial and Continental Gas Association, and he was a director of the London, Brighton, and South Coast Railway. A steam locomotive was named Goldsmid after him in 1892.

Goldsmid was treasurer of University College in 1880-81 and was a member of the council of University College Hospital. He was vice-chancellor of the University of London when he died. He was Deputy lieutenant of Kent, Sussex, and Berkshire, J. P. for Kent, Sussex, and London, colonel of the 1st Sussex Rifle Volunteers, and honorary colonel of the 1st Sussex Artillery Volunteers.

Goldsmid was one of many who was concerned about the Russian persecutions of the Jewish community in 1881. He was assigned as chairman of a fund that focused on the relief of Russo-Jewish refugees. This fund supported the Board of Guardians, a body that performed the Russian exodus into England. The number of refugees permanently residing in London was not large. The majority of refugees continued their voyage to America.

== Marriage ==
In 1868, Goldsmid married Virginia Philipson of Florence and had eight daughters. As he had no son, his entailed property passed to a male relative, his house in Piccadilly being converted into the Isthmian Club.

== Death ==
Goldsmid died at the age of 57 at Brighton where his grandfather, Sir Isaac Goldsmid had purchased the Wick Estate in 1830. "Julian Road" in the estate is named after him.

Parliament of the United Kingdom
Preceded by Frederick Goldsmid; Alexander Baillie-Cochrane	Member of Parliament for Honiton; 1866–1868; With: Alexander Baillie-Cochrane	Constituency abolished
Preceded by Philip Wykeham Martin; John Alexander Kinglake	Member of Parliament for Rochester; 1870 – 1880; With: Philip Wykeham Martin 1870–1878; Sir Arthur Otway 1878–1880	Succeeded by Sir Arthur Otway; Roger Leigh
New constituency See Marylebone	Member of Parliament for St Pancras South; 1885 – 1896	Succeeded by Herbert Jessel
Academic offices
Preceded by Sir James Paget	Vice-Chancellor of University of London; 1895 – 1896	Succeeded by Sir Henry Roscoe
Baronetage of the United Kingdom
Preceded by Francis Henry Goldsmid	Baronet (of St John's Lodge); 1878–1896	Extinct
