= Ralph Bernal =

British politician (1783/84–1854)

Deputy Speaker of the House of Commons Chairman of Ways and Means
- In office 1847 – 1 July 1852
- Speaker: Arthur Onslow
- Preceded by: Thomas Greene
- Succeeded by: The Lord Winmarleigh
- In office 27 June 1831 – 23 June 1841
- Speaker: Arthur Onslow
- Preceded by: Sir Alexander Grant
- Succeeded by: Thomas Greene
Senior political offices
Member of Parliament
In office 26 August 1847 – 1 July 1852
Preceded by	Coningsby Waldo-Sibthorp
Succeeded by	Edward LeRoy Bowerman
Constituency	Rochester
In office 1842 – 23 July 1847
Preceded by	The Viscount Melville
Succeeded by	William Freestun
Constituency	Weymouth and Melcombe Regis
In office 14 April 1820 – 23 June 1841 Serving with See list: The Lord of Haddington (1820–1826); The Viscount Melville (1926–1830); The Earl of Jersey (1830–1831); John Mills (1831–1834); Thomas Twisden Hodges (1834–1835); Thomas Hobhouse (1835–1841)
Preceded by	James Barnett
Succeeded by	William Bodkin
Constituency	Rochester
In office 18 July 1819 – 29 February 1820
Preceded by	Coningsby Waldo-Sibthorp
Succeeded by	Edward LeRoy Bowerman
- Constituency: Lincoln

Personal details
- Born: 2 October 1783 or 1784 London, England
- Died: 26 August 1854 (aged 69–70) London, England
- Party: Whig
- Spouses: Ann White (m. 1806; died 1823) Clara White (m. 1824)
- Children: 2, including Ralph
- Parents: Jacob Israel Bernal Jr.; Leah da Silva
- Education: Christ's College, Cambridge (BA)
- Profession: Barrister; politician; art collector

Ralph Bernal (2 October 1783 or 1784 – 26 August 1854) was a British Whig barrister, politician, and art collector who served as Member of Parliament (MP) four times in various constituencies between 1818 and 1852. He also served as Chairman of Ways and Means, the senior Deputy Speaker of the House of Commons from 1831 to 1841 and again from 1847 to 1852. Bernal is sometimes referred to as The Elder Bernal to distinguish him from his son, Ralph Bernal Osborne, who was also an MP.

== Early life ==
Ralph Bernal was born on 2 October 1783 or 1784 in London as the youngest of two children born to Jacob Israel Bernal Jr., a merchant, (1750–1811) and Leah Bernal (née da Silva; 1750–1820). Both of Bernal's parents were raised as Sephardic Jews but later distanced themselves from it and aligned more with the Church of England by the time of Bernal's birth. Thus, he was baptised into the Church at St Olave's Church in Hart Street.

All of Bernal's grandparents were born in England. Through both of his parents, Bernal was of Iberian descent; he was more Portuguese leaning from his mother's side, while he was more Spanish leaning from his father's side. Bernal's ancestors lived in several cities in Portugal and Spain before fleeing following the expulsion of Jews from the two countries in 1492. The family settled in Amsterdam in The Netherlands before permanently settling in London.

During his youth he became an actor and he performed to acclaim in several works by William Shakespeare, during which time he gained a reputation for oratory.

== Career ==
He was Member of Parliament (MP) for Lincoln 1818–20 and MP for Rochester from 1820 to 1841 and again from 1847 to 1852. From 1842 to 1847 he was MP for Weymouth and Melcombe Regis.

According to the Legacies of British Slave-Ownership at the University College London, Bernal was awarded a payment as a slave trader in the aftermath of the Slavery Abolition Act 1833 with the Slave Compensation Act 1837. The British Government took out a £15 million loan (worth £1.54 billion in 2025) with interest from Nathan Mayer Rothschild and Moses Montefiore which was subsequently paid off by the British taxpayers (ending in 2015). Bernal was associated with three different claims, he owned 564 slaves in Jamaica and received a £11,458 payment at the time (worth £1.18 million in 2025).

Bernal was president of the British Archaeological Association in 1853. He built up a substantial collection of glass, ceramics and other art objects, which were auctioned after his death, with the 4,000 lots selling for £70,000.

== Personal life ==
In April 1806, he married Ann Elizabeth White. Together, they were the parents of:

- Ralph Bernal (1808–1882), a politician, who took on the surname Osborne on marrying Catherine Isabella Osborne, the daughter of Sir Thomas Osborne, 9th Baronet.

Bernal died on 26 August 1854.

Parliament of the United Kingdom
Preceded by John Nicholas Fazakerley; Coningsby Waldo-Sibthorpe	Member of Parliament for Lincoln; 1818 – 1820; With: Coningsby Waldo-Sibthorpe	Succeeded by Coningsby Waldo-Sibthorpe; Robert Percy Smith
Preceded by Lord Binning; James Barnett	Member of Parliament for Rochester; 1820 – 1841; With: Lord Binning 1820–1826; Henry Dundas 1826–1830; Viscount Villiers 1830–1831; John Mills 1831–1835; Thomas Twisden Hodges 1835–1837; Thomas Hobhouse 1837–1841	Succeeded by James Douglas; William Bodkin
Preceded by Viscount Villiers; George William Hope	Member of Parliament for Weymouth & Melcombe Regis; 1842 – 1847; With: William Dougal Christie	Succeeded by William Dougal Christie; William Lockyer Freestun
Preceded by James Douglas Stoddart Douglas; William Bodkin	Member of Parliament for Rochester; 1847 – 1852; With: Thomas Twisden Hodges	Succeeded by Hon. Francis Child Villiers; Sir Thomas Maddock
