= Isthmian Club =

Coordinates: 51.5052°N 0.1464°W

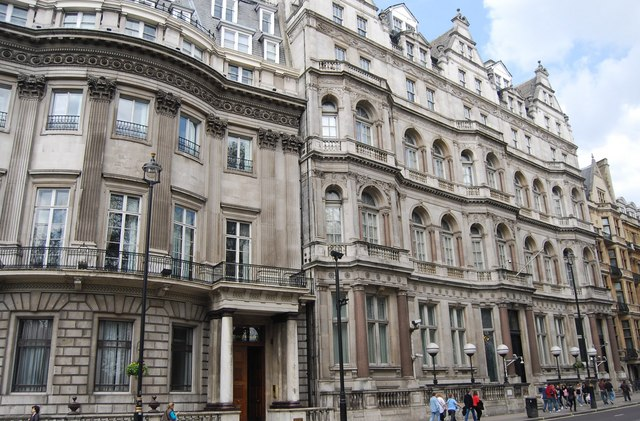
105 Piccadilly (left)

The Isthmian Club, founded in 1882, later had premises at 105, Piccadilly, London, in a grand five-bay house that had belonged to Sir Julian Goldsmid, Bt. The non-political club was open to "Gentlemen who have been educated at one of the universities or public schools, and for officers of the army and navy," who were voted in by ballot of the steering committee. Its members were active in rowing, cricket and other sports.

The Isthmian League, still existing as a prominent regional football league covering London and South East England featuring semi-professional and amateur clubs, was founded in 1905 by amateur clubs in the London area.

The club's Account Book, 1889–97, is conserved by the Westminster City Council (Acc. no. 776).
