= Sir Thomas Thompson, 1st Baronet =

Vice-Admiral Sir Thomas Thompson GCB Bt
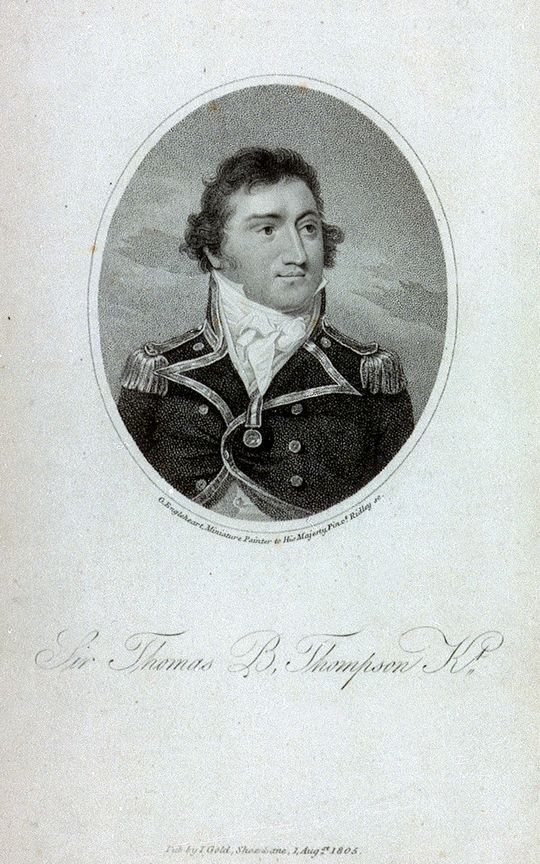
- Portrait of Thompson
- Born: 28 February 1766; Barham, Kent
- Died: 3 March 1828 (aged 62); Hartsbourne, Manor-Place, Hertfordshire
- Military career
- Allegiance: Great Britain; United Kingdom
- Branch: Royal Navy
- Service years: 1778–1828
- Rank: Vice admiral
- Commands: HMS Nautilus; HMS Leander; HMS Bellona; HMS Mary
- Conflicts: French Revolutionary Wars; Battle of Santa Cruz de Tenerife (1797); Battle of the Nile; Action of 18 August 1798; Battle of Copenhagen (1801)
- Awards: Knight Grand Cross of the Order of the Bath

Vice-Admiral Sir Thomas Boulden Thompson, 1st Baronet, GCB (28 February 1766 – 3 March 1828) was a Royal Navy officer who served in the American Revolutionary War, French Revolutionary Wars and Napoleonic Wars. One of Nelson's band of brothers at the Battle of the Nile in 1798, he served as Comptroller of the Navy from 1806 to 1816.

== Family and early life ==
Thompson was born in Barham, Kent on 28 February 1766. His uncle, through his mother, was Commodore Edward Thompson, and it was through this relative's influence that Thomas joined the navy in June 1778, when Edward was appointed to command the sloop HMS Hyaena. He served on the Hyaena with his uncle, spending most of the time in the waters off the British Isles, before accompanying Rodney's fleet to the Relief of Gibraltar in January 1780. The Hyaena was later entrusted with carrying copies of Rodney's despatches.

Thompson later moved to the West Indies, being promoted to lieutenant on 14 January 1782. He was given command of a small schooner, with which he captured a larger French privateer. After the end of the American Revolutionary War, Thompson was moved onto his uncle's flagship, the 50-gun HMS Grampus. He served off the coast of Africa until his uncle's death in 1786, after which he was given command of the sloop HMS Nautilus. He remained in command for the next twelve months, before returning to Britain where she was paid off. He was promoted to post-captain on 22 November 1790.

== Command ==
=== Santa Cruz de Tenerife ===
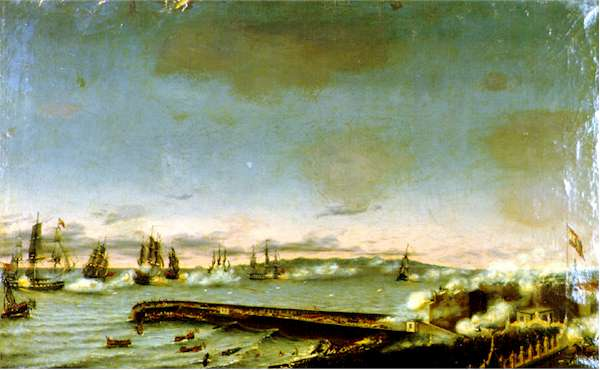
The Battle of Santa Cruz de Tenerife. Thompson was involved in the failed attack.

He spent a number of years on land without command of a ship until the outbreak of the French Revolutionary Wars provided employment. By late 1796 he had secured command of the fourth rate HMS Leander. He then joined the Mediterranean Fleet under John Jervis, and was assigned to the squadron under Horatio Nelson. Thompson took part in Nelson's attack on Santa Cruz in July 1797. Thompson was among those leading the landing parties, under the overall direction of Nelson and Thomas Troubridge. The initial attempts to force a landing were hampered by the wind, and when the parties made a successful landing in the evening of 22 July, they came under heavy fire from the Spanish defenders. Thompson's party were able to advance and spike several of the enemy's cannon, but the British forces had become dispersed throughout the town, and were forced to negotiate a truce to allow them to withdraw. Thompson himself was wounded in the battle.

=== Battle of the Nile ===
Thompson was later given command of a squadron, and carried out cruises in the Mediterranean, intercepting French and Spanish ships. He returned to Gibraltar, but was ordered to sea again in June 1798 to reinforce Nelson's squadron in their hunt for the French fleet that had earlier escaped from Toulon. He was with Nelson when they located the French fleet, under the command of Vice-Admiral Brueys, moored in Aboukir Bay. In the ensuing engagement Thompson came to the assistance of HMS Culloden, which had run aground on shoals in the entrance to the bay. Finding that there was nothing he could do, Thompson took Leander into the battle, despite his ship being considerably smaller than the French ships of the line. He anchored between the Franklin and Brueys' flagship the Orient, firing on them in company with HMS Defence and HMS Swiftsure until the Franklin surrendered. Thompson then took the Leander to assist the British attack on the French rear.

=== Fight with the Généreux ===
After the battle Thompson was joined aboard the Leander by Captain Edward Berry, and sent with Nelson's despatches to Gibraltar. Whilst sailing there, they were spotted on 18 August by the Généreux, which had escaped the Battle of the Nile. The French pursued the Leander. Being a 60 gun ship to the Généreux's 78, and still having battle damage and men wounded from the Nile, Thompson attempted to escape, but was eventually forced to come to battle. The two eventually clashed in a long running engagement, which eventually resulted in Leander being disabled and unmanageable. After conferring with Berry, Thompson agreed to surrender. The Généreux had suffered 100 killed and 188 wounded, to the Leander's 35 killed and 57 wounded. Arriving on board the French ship, Berry and Thompson were almost immediately stripped of their possessions. The French went on to plunder their prize, even going so far as to steal the surgeon's equipment as he tried to attend to the wounded. When Thompson protested, and reminded the French captain of how French prisoners were treated under Nelson, he received the reply 'I am sorry for it; but the fact is, that the French are expert at plunder.'

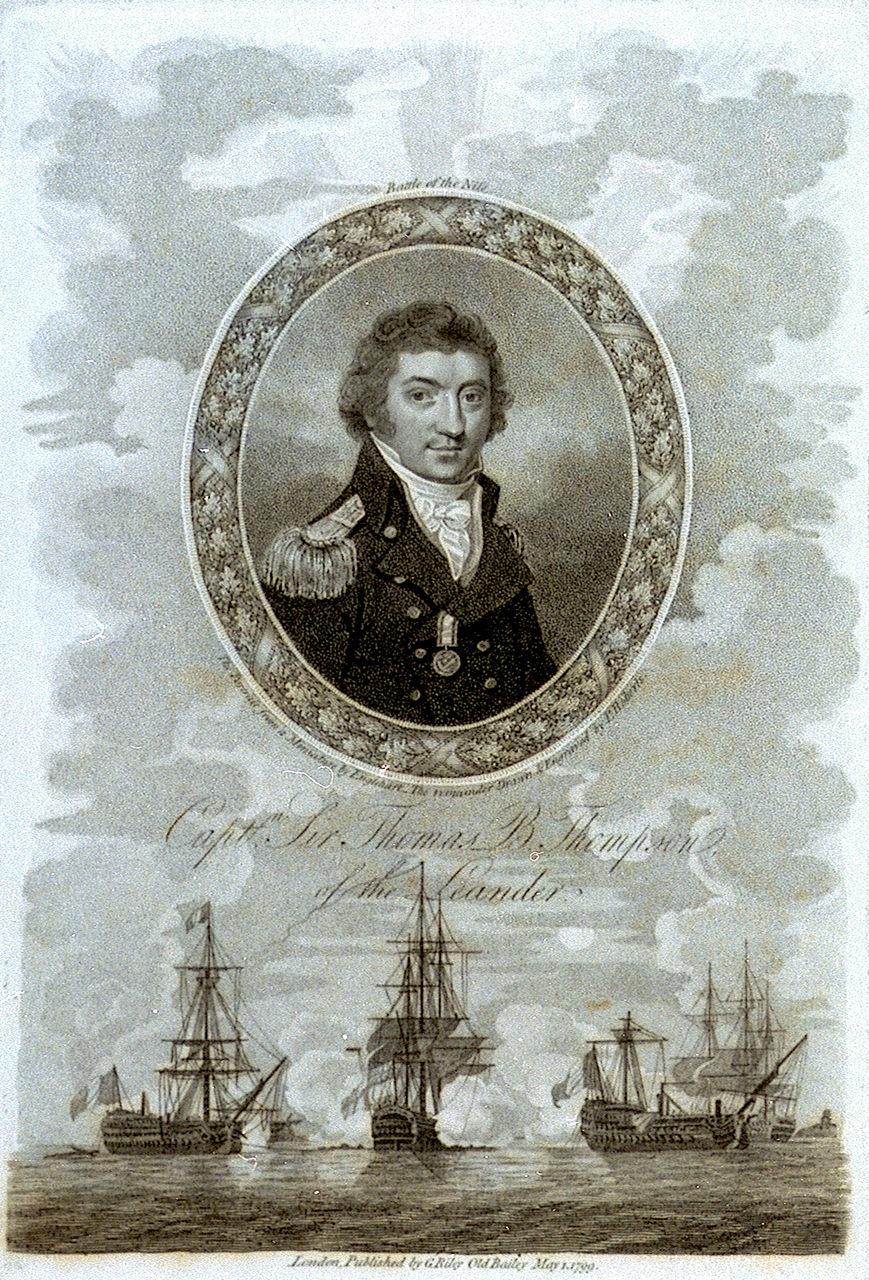
Celebratory picture produced after the Battle of the Nile, entitled Captn Sir Thomas B. Thompson of the Leander

Thompson was later repatriated and brought to court-martial aboard HMS Alexander at Sheerness. He was honourably acquitted for the loss of his ship, the court deciding

that his gallant and almost unprecedented defence of the Leander, against so superior a force as that of le Généreux, was deserving of every praise his country and the assembled court could give; and that his conduct, with that of the officers and men under his command, reflected not only the highest honour on himself and them, but on their country at large.

Berry was also commended, and whilst being rowed back to shore after his acquittal, Thompson was given three cheers by the crews of the ships moored at Sheerness. He was subsequently knighted and awarded a pension of £200 per annum.

=== Copenhagen ===
Thompson was appointed to command HMS Bellona in spring 1799, joining the fleet under Lord Bridport, off Brest. He then went to the Mediterranean, sailing with the flying squadron. He was involved in the capture of three frigates and two brigs. He returned to England in autumn, and participated in the blockade of Brest, until being assigned to Sir Hyde Parker's Baltic expedition in early 1801. He was present at the Battle of Copenhagen, but ran aground on shoals whilst trying to enter the bay. He continued to fire on the enemy's shore batteries, but being a stationary target was heavily damaged, having 11 killed and 63 wounded. Thompson was amongst the wounded, losing a leg. He shared in the thanks of Parliament after the battle and had his pension increased to £500. He was then appointed to command the yacht HMS Mary.

=== Later life ===
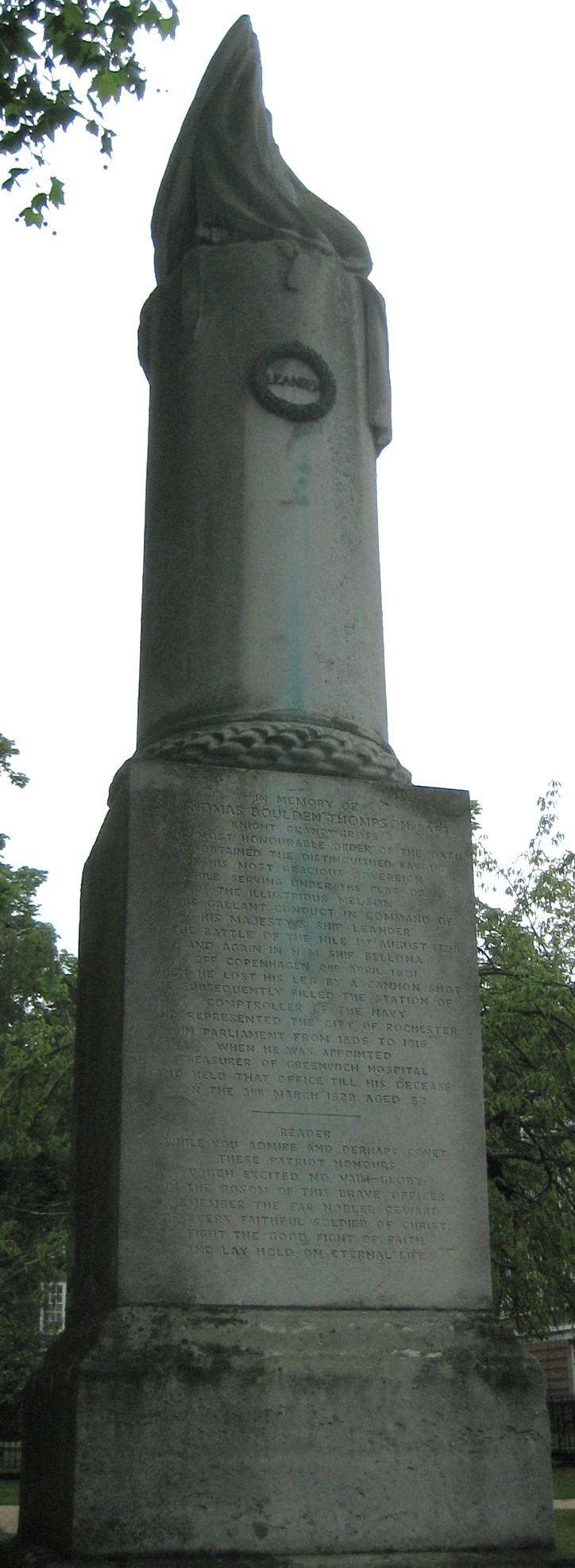
Thompson's tomb, in the grounds of the Royal Hospital Greenwich

Thompson was appointed Comptroller of the Navy in November 1806, an office he held until November 1816. He was created a baronet on 11 December 1806. On relinquishing the post of Comptroller he became Treasurer of the Royal Hospital at Greenwich, succeeding the late Sir John Colpoys, and also became Director of the Chest. He became Member of Parliament for Rochester in 1807, relinquishing the position in June 1818. He became a Rear-Admiral on 25 October 1809 and a Vice-Admiral on 4 June 1814. He was appointed a Knight Commander of the Order of the Bath in the reorganisation of that order on 2 January 1815, and a Knight Grand Cross of the Order of the Bath on 14 September 1822, and was formally invested on 21 April 1823. On his death three years later he was buried at the Greenwich Hospital, where his tomb monument is still visible.

== Family and personal life ==
Thomas married Anne Raikes on 25 February 1799. They had a total of five children, three boys and two girls. The two girls were named Anne and Mary. Their first son, Thomas Boulden, died young. Their second, Thomas Raikes-Trigge inherited the baronetcy. He followed his father and had a career in the navy. Their third son, Thomas John, died in 1807. Sir Thomas died at the family seat of Hartsbourne, Manor-Place, Hertfordshire on 3 March 1828.

== Notes ==
Military offices
Preceded by Sir Andrew Hamond	Comptroller of the Navy; 1806–1816	Succeeded by Sir Thomas Martin
Parliament of the United Kingdom
Preceded by John Calcraft and James Barnett	Member of Parliament for Rochester; 1807–1818; With: John Calcraft	Succeeded by John Calcraft and James Barnett
Baronetage of Great Britain
New creation	Baronet (of Hartsbourne Manor); 1806–1828	Succeeded by Thomas Thompson
