= Richard Berde =

English politician

Richard Berde (fl. 1398–1401) was an English politician. He sat as MP for Rochester in 1401.

In February 1398, he and another conveyed a shop in the city to John Sheep.

He may have been a descendant of Adam Berde, who sat as MP for Rochester several times between 1305 and 1330.
