= Henry Clerke (MP for Rochester) =

Henry Clerke (fl. 1620s) was an English lawyer and politician who sat in the House of Commons between 1621 and 1626.

Clerke was recorder of Rochester. He was elected member of parliament for Rochester in 1621 until 1622 under the reign of King James I. He was re-elected MP for Rochester in 1625 for both parliaments in that year under King Charles I. His political seat was the house in Rochester later named Restoration House which he created from some existing buildings.

In 1637, Clerke was made a serjeant-at law and some time before 1642, he acquired the manor of Ulcomb from Sir William St Leger. As Clerke supported King Charles in the Civil War, Restoration House was sequestered and used by Colonel Gibbon as a headquarters in southeast England.

Clerke married Grace Morgan, daughter of George Morgan of Crow Lane House, Rochester. His sons Francis and John were also MPs for Rochester.

Parliament of England
Preceded by Sir Thomas Walsingham; Sir Edwin Sandys	Member of Parliament for Rochester; 1621–1622; With: Sir Thomas Walsingham	Succeeded by Sir Thomas Walsingham; Maximilian Dalyson
Preceded by Sir Thomas Walsingham; Maximilian Dalyson	Member of Parliament for Rochester; 1625–1626; With: Sir Thomas Walsingham	Succeeded by Sir Thomas Walsingham; William Brooke
