= Thomas Twisden Hodges =

English Liberal Party politician

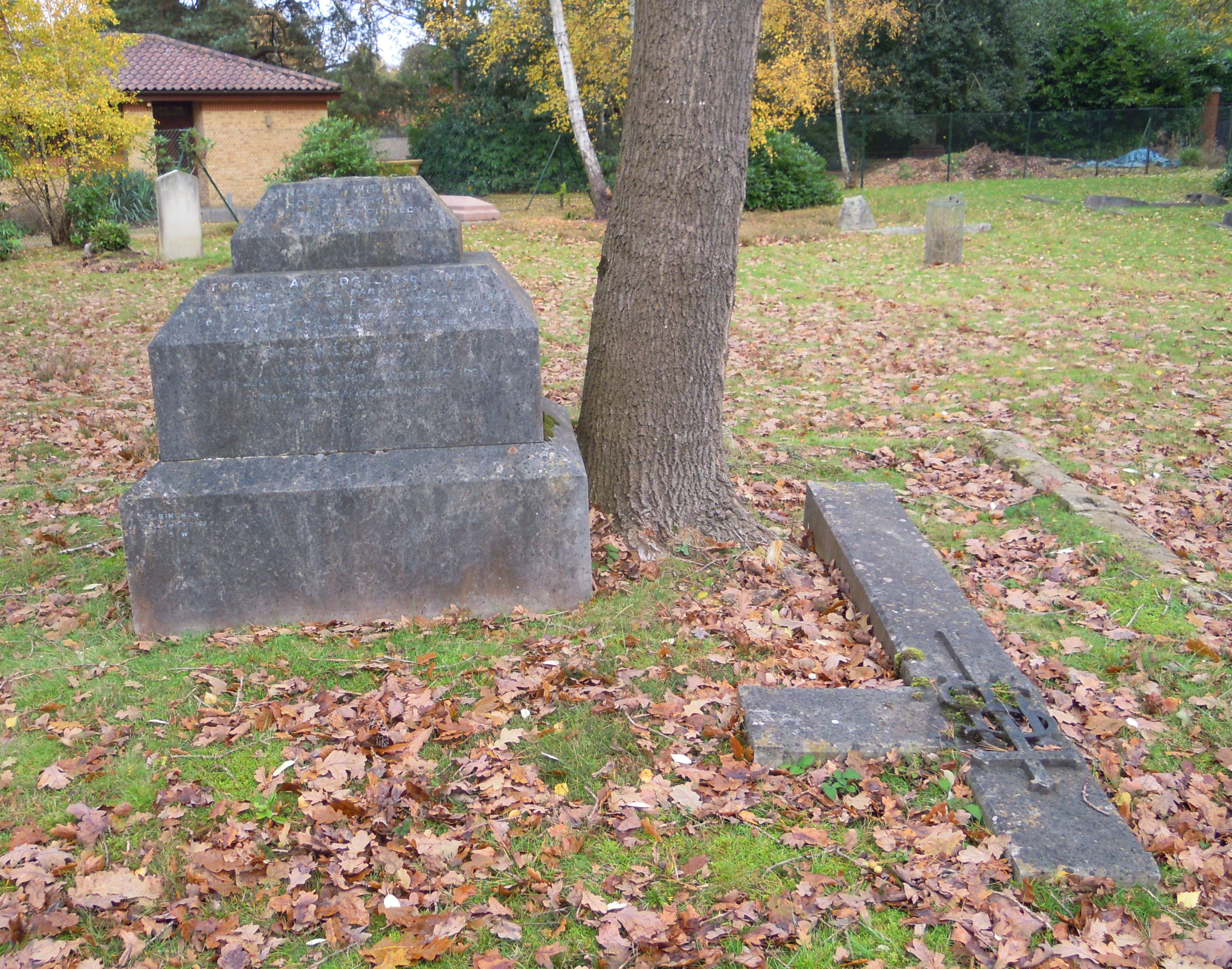
Grave of Thomas Twisden Hodges in Brookwood Cemetery

Thomas Twisden Hodges (29 August 1809 – 12 March 1865) was an English Liberal Party politician who sat in the House of Commons in two periods between 1835 and 1852.

Hodges was the son of Thomas Law Hodges of Hemsted Park, MP for West Kent, and his wife Rebecca Twisden, daughter of Sir Roger Twisden.

Hodges was elected at the 1835 general election as a Member of Parliament (MP) for the borough of Rochester, but did not stand again in 1837. He unsuccessfully contested a by-election in 1842 for the borough of Canterbury, winning only 17 votes out of 1417. He was returned for Rochester at the 1847 general election, and held the seat until he stood down in 1852.

Hodges was a major in the West Kent Militia.

In 1856 Hodges was living at St Hilda's when he was declared insolvent.

Hodges married firstly, Mary Ann Floretta Chandless. He married secondly, in 1854, Rosa, Lady Nott, widow of General Sir William Nott, and daughter of Major P. L. Dore, 3rd Foot. After her second husband's death she resumed the name Lady Nott. She died in August 1901. Thomas Twisden Hodges is buried in Brookwood Cemetery.

Parliament of the United Kingdom
Preceded by John Mills; Ralph Bernal	Member of Parliament for Rochester; 1835 – 1837; With: Ralph Bernal	Succeeded by Thomas Hobhouse; Ralph Bernal
Preceded by James Douglas; William Bodkin	Member of Parliament for Rochester; 1847 – 1852; With: Ralph Bernal	Succeeded by Hon. Francis Child Villiers; Sir Thomas Maddock
