= John Alexander Kinglake =

English barrister and Member of Parliament

John Alexander Kinglake (25 June 1802 – 9 July 1870) was an English barrister and Liberal politician who sat in the House of Commons from 1857 to 1870.

Kinglake was at born at Chilton-on-Polden, the son of Robert Kinglake MD of Taunton and his wife Joanna Apperly, daughter of Anthony Apperly of Herefordshire. He was educated at Eton College and at Trinity College, Cambridge graduating BA in 1826 and MA in 1830. He was called to the bar at Lincoln's Inn in 1830. In 1844 he was made a Serjeant-at-Law. He was Recorder of Exeter in 1849 and became Recorder of Bristol in 1856. He was a barrister on the western Circuit and was a Deputy Lieutenant and J.P. for Somerset.

Kinglake stood unsuccessfully for parliament at Wells in July 1852 and in 1855. At the 1857 general election he was elected Member of Parliament for Rochester. He held the seat until his death at the age of 68 in 1870.

Kinglake married Louisa Rebecca Liddon daughter of John Liddon of Taunton in 1835. Their son Robert Kinglake was a rower in the Boat Race and at Henley Royal Regatta.

Parliament of the United Kingdom
Preceded by Sir Thomas Maddock; Philip Wykeham Martin	Member of Parliament for Rochester; 1857 – 1870; With: Philip Wykeham Martin	Succeeded by Julian Goldsmid; Philip Wykeham Martin
