= Nicholas Hurleston =

16th-century English politician

Nicholas Hurleston (by 1491 – will made 1531), of London, was an English politician.

He was a Member of Parliament (MP) for Rochester in 1529.
