= Francis Hughes-Hallett =

British politician and army officer

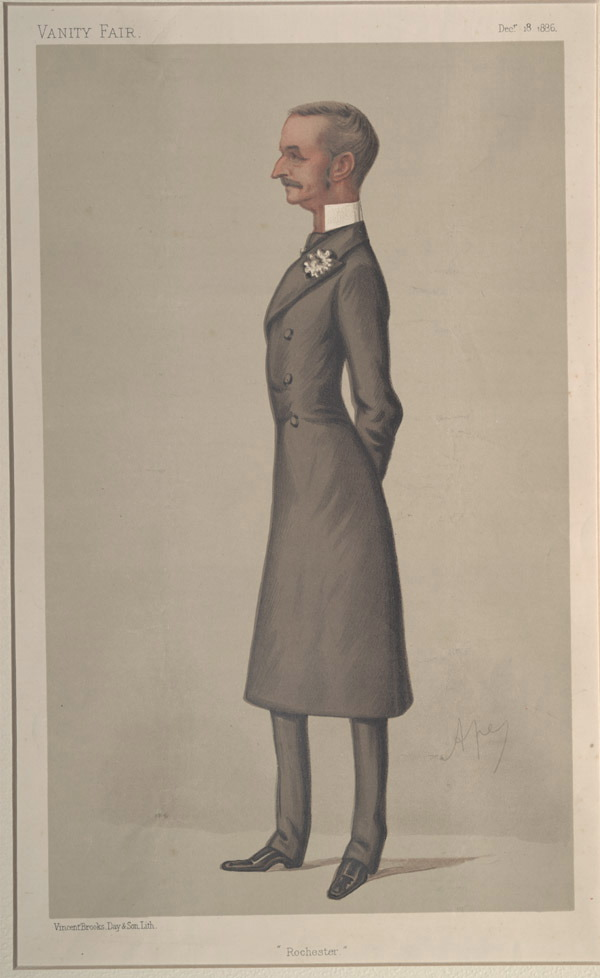
- "Rochester". Caricature by Ape published in Vanity Fair in 1886.

Member of Parliament for Rochester
- In office 1885–1889
- Preceded by: Sir Arthur Otway; Roger Leigh
- Succeeded by: Edward Knatchbull-Hugessen

Personal details
- Born: Francis Charles Hughes-Hallett; 1838
- Died: 22 June 1903
- Political party: Conservative

Francis Charles Hughes-Hallett (1838 – 22 June 1903) was a Royal Artillery officer and Conservative politician who represented Rochester in the British House of Commons. He was damaged politically by a personal scandal.

Hughes-Hallet was the son of Charles Madras Hughes-Hallett and his wife Emma Mary Roberts. He became a colonel in the Royal Artillery. In 1885 he was elected as Member of Parliament for Rochester and reelected in 1886. However, a personal scandal led to his being hounded by the press and shunned by his parliamentary colleagues and he stood down from Parliament in 1889. He was involved in the investigation of the murder of Martha Tabram in Whitechapel in 1888, one of the cases linked with Jack the Ripper.

== Military career ==
He was commissioned in the Royal Regiment of Artillery in December 1859 and served in the army until 1885.

== Marriages ==
In 1871, Hughes-Hallett married Catherine Rosalie Greene, the widow of Sir Charles Jasper Selwyn and of Reverend Harry Dupuis. They had three children: Frank Victor (1872-1937, married Hilda Marion Cook and Katherine Gameson Swinnerton), Egerton (1873-1890), and Sybil Rosalie (1875-1958, married Graham Brown). Catherine Hughes-Hallett, who died in childbirth in 1875, also brought to the marriage four children from her previous marriage, a son, Harry Jasper Selwyn (1870-1919), a stepson, Charles William Selwyn (1858-1893, married Isabella Constance Dalgety), and two stepdaughters, Edith Adriana Selwyn (1859-1910, married Edward Grant Fraser-Tytler) and Beatrice Eugénie Selwyn (1865-1898, married Patrick Herbert).

In 1882, Hughes-Hallett wed a middle-aged American heiress, Emilie Page von Schaumberg (1833-1923), the daughter of James von Schaumberg and Caroline Page, but the marriage ran into difficulties five years later, when Hughes-Hallet was caught in flagrante delicto with his first wife's stepdaughter, Beatrice.

== Scandal ==
During a country-house weekend around 15 August 1887 at Ellingham Hall, Bungay, Norfolk, the home of W. Henry Smith, Colonel Hughes-Hallett was caught in the bedroom of Beatrice Selwyn, whose stepmother had been Hughes-Hallett's first wife. As Smith, who was Miss Selwyn's uncle, wrote to Emilie Hughes-Hallett, "I went to your husband's bedroom shortly before midnight and found that he was not there. I then called upon a housekeeper ... as well as the young lady’s maid and I gave them instructions to enter her room. You know the rest. I gave him half an hour to pack up his things and turned him out of the house."

The affair had been of some duration, having begun in the Hughes-Hallett's London residence, where he lived with his second wife and his minor children. Hughes-Hallett also "admitted accompanying [Beatrice Selwyn] to various hotels—the Bear at Havant, the Crown at Emsworth and the Cannon Street Hotel. The lady gave birth to a child."

Complicating matters too was that Hughes-Hallett, always short of cash, had secretly borrowed money from Beatrice Selwyn, in the amount of £5,000. As Hughes-Hallett said in his defence, "Regarding the money part of the question, Miss Selwyn some time ago asked me to try to get her better interest on 5,000 pounds than she was getting. She covenanted by a deed in my possession to lend money for five years. Some weeks ago her solicitors suddenly called the money in. Within twenty-four hours the principal, with interest, was handed my solicitors for transference to her solicitors." He also initially disputed that he was the father of Beatrice Selwyn's child or that he hoped to have access to Miss Selwyn's £40,000 fortune.

W. T. Stead published the allegation of the affair on the front page of The Pall Mall Gazette for 20 September 1887.

== Aftermath of the scandal ==
Though Hughes-Hallett maintained some degree of success in political circles, his personal reputation was largely destroyed. As The New York Times sympathetically stated in 1888, "the critical press are so unkind as to stigmatize him as a social leper ..." Still, it pointed out, he did not enjoy the "Parliamentary session, however, as no member will sit on the same bench with him". And Beatrice Selwyn's brother, Captain Charles William Selwyn, also an MP, threatened to horsewhip his sister's seducer if they ever crossed paths in the House of Commons.

Soon Hughes-Hallett separated from his wife, who went to live in Dinard, Brittany, for the remainder of her life. In 1893 he sued Passmore Edwards, a newspaper publisher who had been the defeated Liberal candidate for Rochester, for libel, when Edwards declared that Hughes-Hallett had no business running again for Parliament unless he could be voted in as the Member of Parliament for Sodom and Gomorrah.

In the libel action, Edwards stated that "Sodom and Gomorrah as a suitable constituency for Col Hughes-Hallett carried no criminal imputation; that it only referred to uncleanliness of living, and that in respect of this Col Hughes-Hallett's reputation so stank in the public nostrils that nothing that could be said could affect it." As for the judge in the case, he said, "That Col Hughes-Hallett's reputation is so bad that nothing that can be said of him can injure it, and Col Hughes-Hallett has no right to ask for consideration from any man." The jury returned a verdict for the defendants and Hughes-Hallett lost the case.

Parliament of the United Kingdom
Preceded by Sir Arthur Otway; Roger Leigh	Member of Parliament for Rochester; 1885 – 1889	Succeeded by Edward Knatchbull-Hugessen
