= James Douglas Stoddart Douglas =

British politician (1793–1875)

James Douglas Stoddart Douglas (1793 – 25 February 1875) was a British Conservative Party politician.

== Life ==
James Douglas Stoddart was born in 1793, the son of George Alexander Stoddart and mother known only by the surname Bridges.

He served in the Royal Navy, promoted to Lieutenant in 1815 on HMS Doris, under Captain Robert O'Brien, then on the East India station. He became a Lieutenant in the Yeomanry Cavalry. He was elected at the 1841 general election as a Member of Parliament (MP) for the borough of Rochester, but was defeated at the 1847 general election.

== Family ==
Stoddart, as he then was, married, firstly, Margaret Braziere Douglas, daughter of George Douglas, in 1830. Margaret and her father, George, were both adopted. George Douglas of Chilston Park (died 1833) was a slave-owner in Trinidad and Tobago; he left property to Margaret and her husband. Stoddart changed his name to James Douglas Stoddart Douglas in 1833. A further inheritance towards the end of his life led to him styling himself James Douglas of Baads; it related to the Scottish estate of Baads in West Calder (also Badds), which had earlier passed from George Douglas to Alexander Houston-Douglas, then Elizabeth Houston-Douglas. It went subsequently to Aretas Akers-Douglas, 1st Viscount Chilston.

He married, secondly, Jane Sarah Jenkin, daughter of James Jenkin R.E., in 1866.

Parliament of the United Kingdom
Preceded by Thomas Hobhouse; Ralph Bernal	Member of Parliament for Rochester; 1841 – 1847; With: William Bodkin	Succeeded by Ralph Bernal; Thomas Twisden Hodges
