= James Barnett (MP) =

British politician (1760–1836)

James Barnett (c. 1760 – 1 October 1836) was an English banker and Whig politician who sat in the House of Commons variously between 1806 and 1820.

Barnett was the son of Charles Barnett and his wife Bridget Clayton, daughter of Alexander Clayton. He became a banker.

Barnett was elected as a Member of Parliament (MP) for Rochester at the 1806 general election and held the seat until 1807, when he did not contest the election. He was re-elected for Rochester at a by-election on 27 June 1816 but his election was declared void on 26 February 1817 because the poll had been closed early. He was elected unopposed at the subsequent by-election which was held on 6 March 1817 and held the seat until 1820, when he did not contest that year's general election.

Barnett died aged around 76. His wife was named Ann. Their eldest recorded son Charles James Barnett was a cricketer and politician.

Parliament of the United Kingdom
Preceded by Sir Sidney Smith; James Hulkes	Member of Parliament for Rochester; 1806–1807; With: John Calcraft	Succeeded by John Calcraft; Sir Thomas Thompson
Preceded by John Calcraft; Sir Thomas Thompson	Member of Parliament for Rochester; 1816–1820; With: John Calcraft 1816–1818; Lord Binning 1818–1820	Succeeded by Lord Binning; Ralph Bernal
