= Thomas Hobhouse =

British politician

Thomas Benjamin Hobhouse (19 June 1807 – 31 December 1876) was a British Liberal Party politician.

Hobhouse was the son of Sir Benjamin Hobhouse, 1st Baronet, by his second wife Amelia, daughter of Reverend Joshua Parry. The Whig politician and pamphleteer Lord Broughton was his half-brother.

He was educated at Balliol College, Oxford, where he matriculated in 1825 and graduated BA in 1828. He was President of the Oxford Union for Trinity term, 1828 after which he entered the Middle Temple and became a barrister-at-law in 1833.

He sat as member of parliament for Rochester from 1837 to 1841 and for Lincoln from 1848 to 1852.

Hobhouse died in December 1876, aged 69. He never married.

Parliament of the United Kingdom
Preceded by Thomas Twisden Hodges; Ralph Bernal	Member of Parliament for Rochester; 1837–1841; With: Ralph Bernal	Succeeded by James Douglas; William Bodkin
Preceded by Charles Sibthorp; Charles Seely	Member of Parliament for Lincoln; 1848–1852; With: Charles Sibthorp	Succeeded by Charles Sibthorp; George Heneage
