= Society for the Suppression of Mendicity =

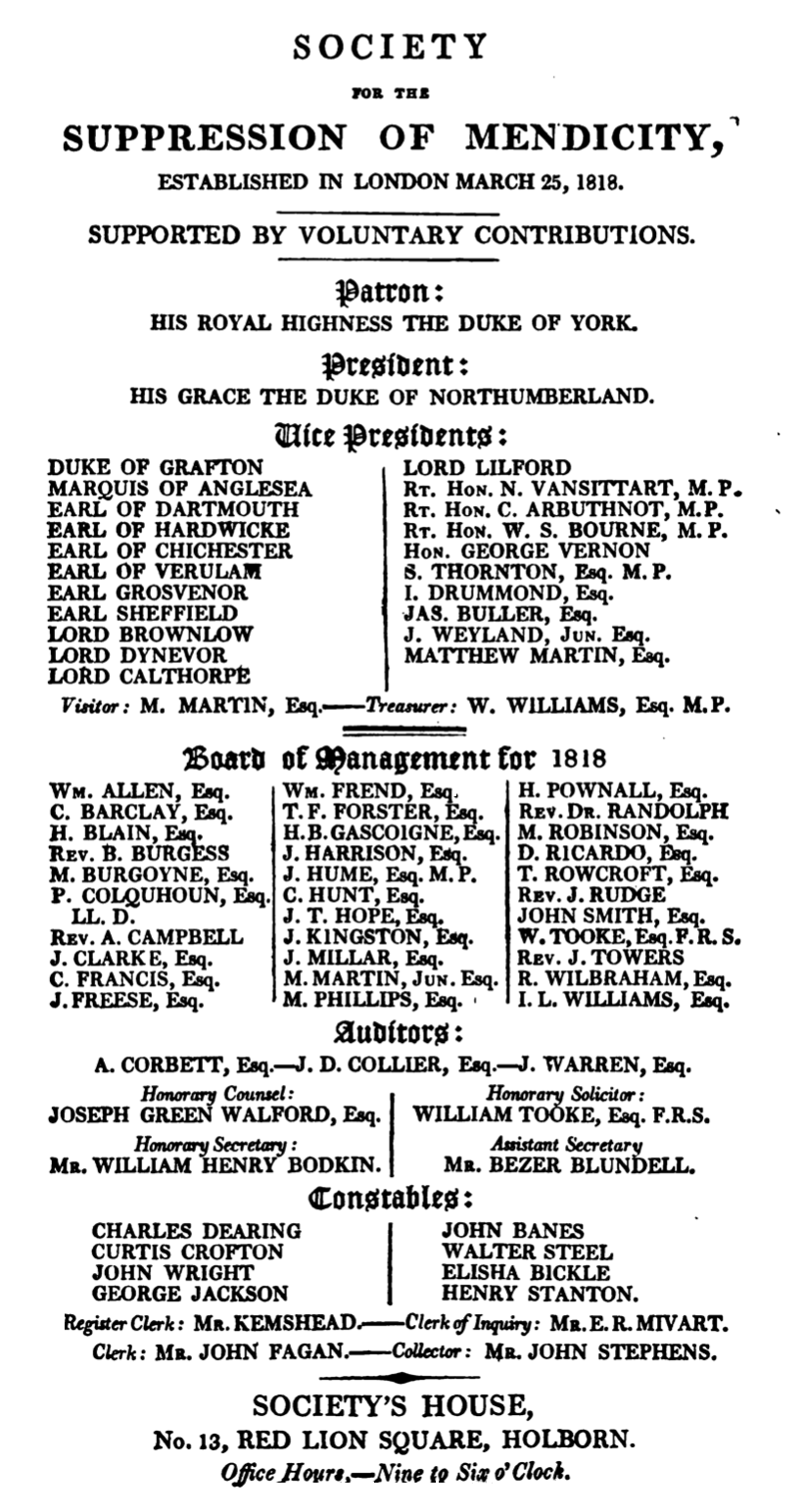
List of post-holders in the first report of the Society, 1819

The Society for the Suppression of Mendicity was a British charitable organisation, established as a joint-stock company in 1818 and operating until 1959. It aimed to deal with a supposed problem of begging in the streets of London, and begging by letter, by a range of measures including discouraging falsehood and imposture on the part of beggars; making inquiries into the circumstances of individual beggars and making interventions in their lives; and sponsoring the removal of beggars to parishes from which they were determined by the society to originate. It did not, at least in its stated aims, seek to diminish direct donations to beggars.

== History ==
The impetus for the society came from William Bodkin, who advertised and organised a meeting on 5 January 1818 at which a determination to form the society was made, and who from its 25 March 1818 foundation date acted as honorary secretary until 1830. Bodkin also acted as "assistant manager" of the society's inquiry and relief office, at a salary of up to £300 per annum, (Note: £300 per annum in 1825 equates to £23,049 in 2023, according to the Bank of England inflation calculator.) plus bonuses.

M.J.D. Roberts notes two classes of early members of the society; father-figures - individuals already associated with the cause of dealing with beggars and who provided an imprimatur for the society, such as Matthew Martin, responsible for the establishment of the Bath Society for the Investigation and Relief of Occasional Distress; William Allen a Quaker well known for his work in schemes of social and penal improvement; and Patrick Colquhoun, founder of the first regular preventive police force in England; and then early enthusiasts such as Joseph Hume, David Ricardo, Charles Barclay, John Abel Smith, William Williams and William Sturges Bourne, all MPs, who allied themselves with the society in its earliest stages to further their interests in fostering moral self-discipline amongst the working population.

Perhaps arising from Joseph Hume's persuasion, Prince Frederick, Duke of York and Albany, second son of the monarch, George III, became patron of the society in its first year. Hugh Percy, 2nd Duke of Northumberland took office as president, and the society attracted a contingent of aristocrats as vice-presidents. For many years the society retained its royal connection; William IV, whilst still Duke of Clarence and St Andrews, took on his brother's role upon Frederick's death in 1827, and Queen Victoria replaced William on his death in 1837.

The society appears widely to have been recognised as filling a gap in the provision of charitable activity in London, and established a solid funding base of about 1,500 regular subscribers, and a larger set of casual donors, so that its annual revenue for the first ten years of operation was circa £3,000. It quickly established offices at 13 Red Lion Square, Holburn.

The society was criticised in its early years for the high level of remuneration paid to its managers, especially Bodkin. Adverse comment in The Times in 1824 led to a special meeting of subscribers in February 1825, and an action for libel on the part of Bodkin, against The Times, later that year. (Note: The progress and outcome of the libel action is described in a footnote to an "Ode to H. Bodkin Esq.", by Thomas Hood; Scarlett, for the defence, compared Bodkin to a character from Gil Blas, who "throve on his master's reputation for charity by collecting money to be distributed by him among the poor and putting it in his own pocket", and whilst the jury found for the plaintiff, Bodkin, he was awarded just 30s damages and 40s costs.) Theodore Hook took aim at the society in his 1824 Sayings and Doings, noting of one of his characters that "Mr Harding was a subscriber to the Mendicity Society, an institution which proposes to check beggary by the novel mode of giving nothing to the poor". The Times continued its criticism in 1825.

== Works ==
- The First Report of the Society for the Suppression of Mendicity (1819)
