= Robert Fisher (MP) =

16th-century English politician

Robert Fisher (ca. 1465–1535) was an English politician.

He was a member of parliament (MP) for Rochester in 1529.
