= Coningsby Waldo-Sibthorp =

English politician

Coningsby Waldo Waldo-Sibthorp (1781 – 9 March 1822) was an English politician.

Waldo-Sibthorp was educated at Louth Grammar School, Westminster School and Corpus Christi College, Oxford. He was Member of Parliament (MP) for Lincoln from 1814 until his death.

Parliament of the United Kingdom
Preceded by Henry Sullivan	Member of Parliament for Lincoln; 1814 – 1822; With: John Nicholas Fazakerley; Ralph Bernal; Bobus Smith	Succeeded by John Williams
