= Francis Child Villiers =

British politician

Member of Parliament for Rochester
- In office 1852-1856

Personal details
- Born: 11 October 1819
- Died: 8 May 1862 (aged 42)
- Party: Conservative
- Parents: George Child Villiers (father); Lady Sarah Fane (mother)
- Relatives: George Child Villiers (brother); Sarah Child-Villiers (sister)

The Honourable Francis John Robert Child Villiers (11 October 1819 – 8 May 1862) was a British Conservative Party politician.

Child Villiers was the fourth son of George Child Villiers, 5th Earl of Jersey, by his wife Lady Sarah Fane. He was elected as a Member of Parliament (MP) for the borough of Rochester in Kent at the 1852 general election and resigned through appointment as Steward of the Chiltern Hundreds on 22 November 1855.

Villiers was appointed a Steward of the Jockey Club in 1853. In 1855 he left the country, with £100,000 of betting debts unpaid.

Parliament of the United Kingdom
| Preceded by Ralph Bernal; Thomas Twisden Hodges | Member of Parliament for Rochester; 1852 – 1856; With: Thomas Herbert Maddock | Succeeded by Philip Wykeham Martin; Thomas Herbert Maddock |
