= Richard Broke (14th century MP) =

14th-century English politician

Richard Broke was a Member of Parliament for Rochester in 1395.
