= William Bodkin (judge) =

British barrister, judge and Conservative Party politician

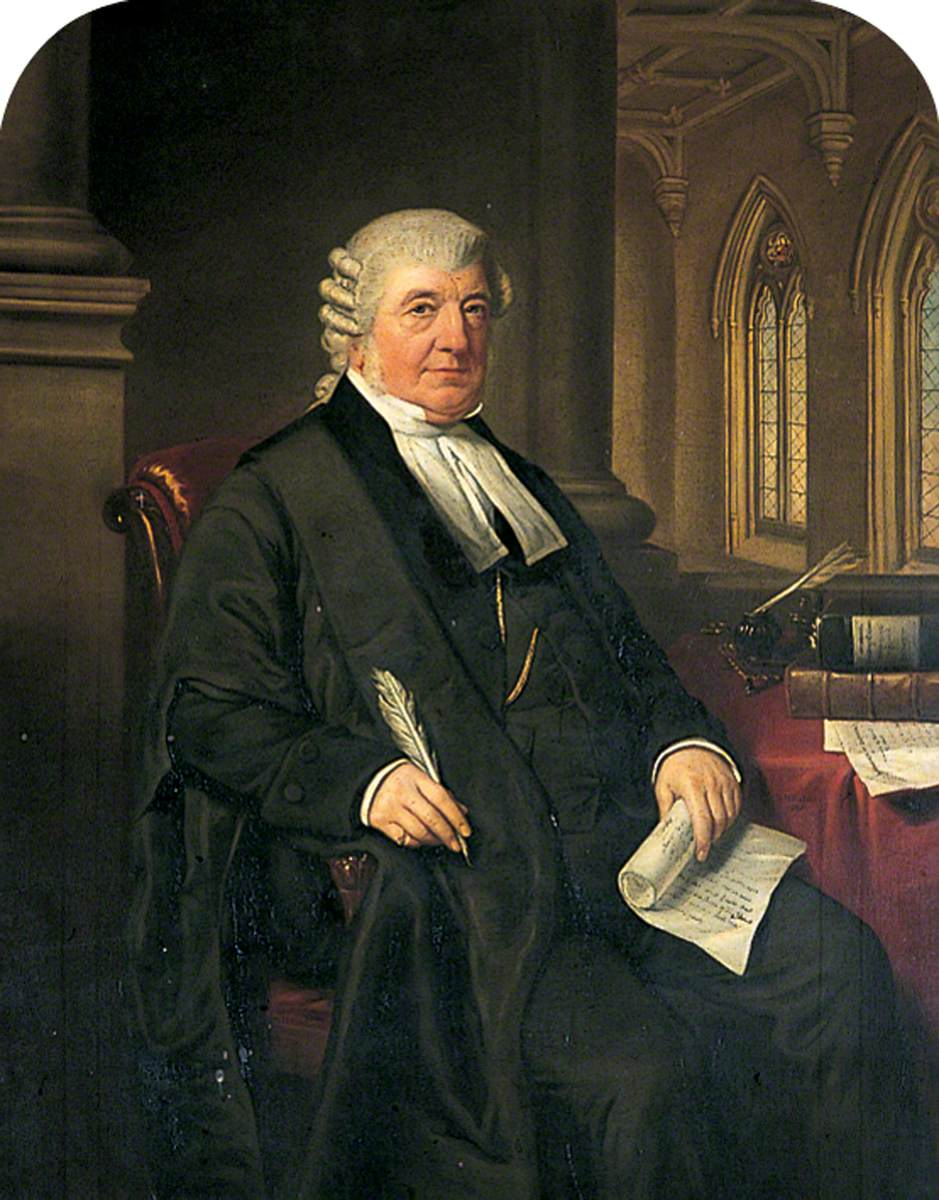
William Bodkin, 1861 portrait

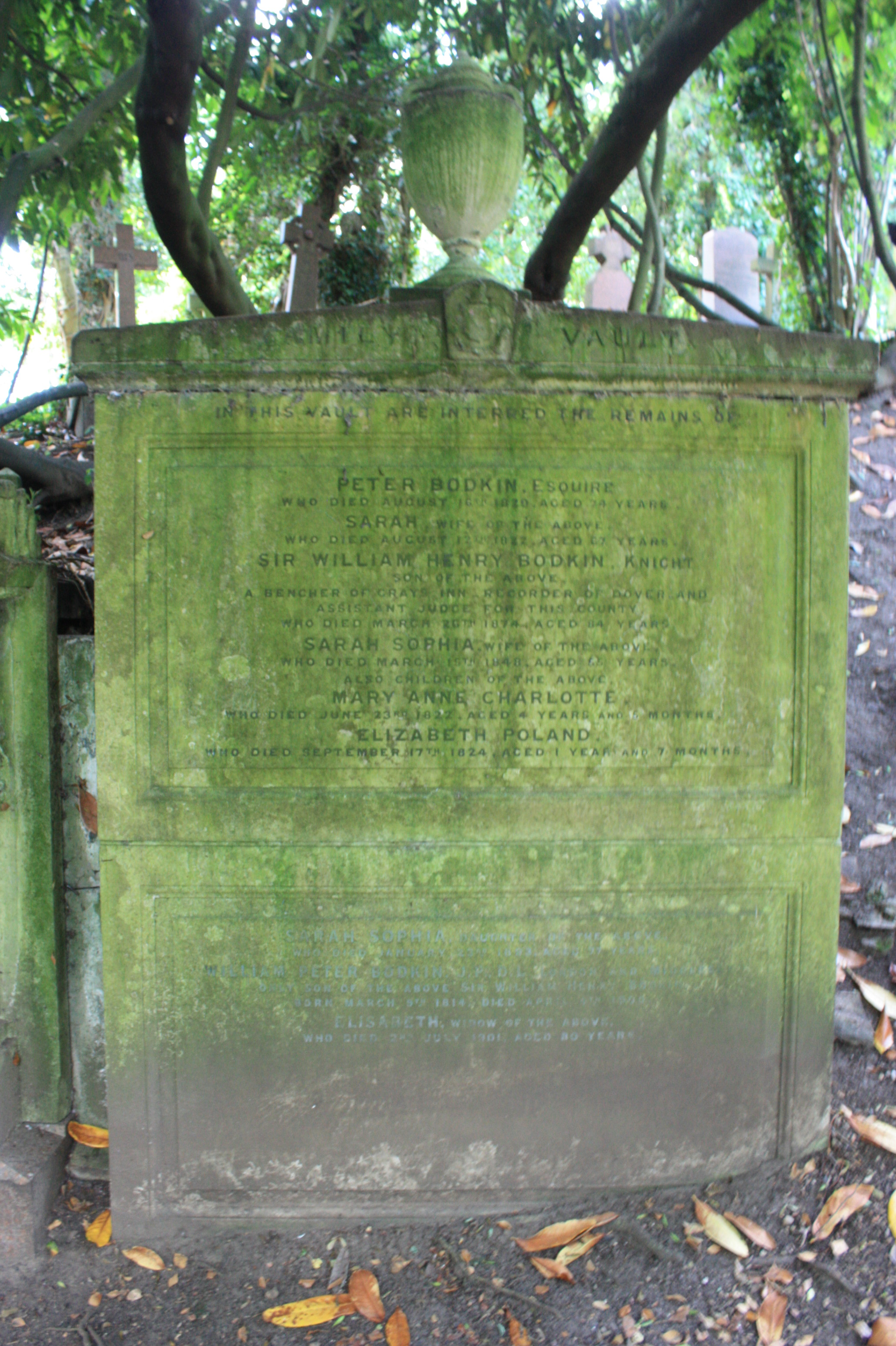
The grave of William Bodkin, Highgate Cemetery, London

Sir William Henry Bodkin (5 August 1791 – 26 March 1874) was a British barrister and Conservative Party politician who sat in the House of Commons from 1841 to 1847, before becoming a judge.

== Early life ==
Bodkin was the son of Peter Bodkin from Galway and his wife Sarah. His father's family had long connections with County Galway.

He was educated at the Islington Academy and called to the bar in 1826 at Gray's Inn.

== Career ==
Bodkin is described, in his early career, as an auctioneer and house agent. In 1818 he was the leading founder and became honorary secretary of the Society for the Suppression of Mendicity, a position he held until 1830; and from 1921 he acted as the perhaps disproportionately salaried "assistant manager" of the Society's inquiry and relief office, receiving £300 per annum plus bonuses. (Note: Bodkin's position with the Society for the Suppression of Mendicity is celebrated in Thomas Hood's poem "To H. Bodkin, Esq." in Humorous Poems of Thomas Hood (1866)) The assertion is made that he used the connections afforded by his work with that society, to "launch himself as a barrister".

Bodkin initially practised on the Home Circuit, taking mostly criminal cases at the Middlesex, Westminster and Kent Sessions, and in the Central Criminal Court in the Old Bailey. was appointed as a recorder of Dover in 1834. He also appeared for the prosecution at the Old Bailey murder trial of Thomas Smethurst in July-August 1859.

He was elected at the 1841 general election as a Member of Parliament (MP) for the borough of Rochester in Kent, winning the seat by a margin of only two votes over the Liberal Party candidate Viscount Melgund. Bodkin was defeated at the 1847 general election as a result of his support for the free trade measures introduced by Sir Robert Peel. He did not stand at the 1852 general election, but unsuccessfully contested the borough at a by-election in February 1856.

He was knighted in 1867. He later became a Justice of the Peace (J.P) in Middlesex, and a Deputy Lieutenant of Middlesex, and judge of the Court of Sessions in Middlesex.

He was an active member of the Society of Arts, becoming its vice-president. He was president of the Highgate Literary and Scientific Institution and he wrote several pamphlets on the English Poor Laws.

Bodkin died aged 82 on 26 March 1874, after a long and painful illness. He was buried in the family grave at Highgate Cemetery

== Personal life ==
Bodkin lived at West Hill in Highgate, North London.

He married twice, first in 1812 to Sara Sophia Poland, who died in 1848, and then in 1865 to Sarah Constance Miles, the daughter of Joseph Johnson Miles, a J.P from Highgate. He had one son and one daughter. His son, William Peter Bodkin (d.1900), succeeded him in several of his judging roles, and was the father of Sir Archibald Bodkin.

He is buried with his first wife.

== Notes ==
Parliament of the United Kingdom
Preceded by Thomas Hobhouse; Ralph Bernal	Member of Parliament for Rochester; 1841 – 1847; With: James Douglas Stoddart Douglas	Succeeded by Ralph Bernal; Thomas Twisden Hodges
