= Rochester (constituency) =

Former parliamentary constituency in the United Kingdom

Coordinates: 51°23′N 0°30′E

- Former borough constituency for the House of Commons
- County: Kent

1295–1918
- Seats: 1295–1885: Two; 1885–1918: One
- Replaced by: Chatham; Gillingham

Rochester was a parliamentary constituency in Kent. It returned two members of parliament (MPs) to the House of Commons of England from 1295 to 1707, then to the House of Commons of Great Britain from 1708 to 1800, and finally to the House of Commons of the Parliament of the United Kingdom from 1801 until the 1885 general election, when its representation was reduced to one seat.

In 1918, it was split between Chatham and Gillingham. The Chatham seat became Rochester and Chatham in 1950, and then Medway in 1983. When the boroughs of Rochester upon Medway and Gillingham merged to form the larger unitary Borough of Medway in 1998, the Parliamentary constituency of Medway only covered part of the new borough, so for the 2010 election it was renamed Rochester and Strood.

== Members of Parliament ==
=== MPs 1295–1640 ===
| Parliament | First member | Second member |
|---|---|---|
| 1386 | John Fleming | Peter Pope |
| 1388 (Feb) | William Gillingham I | John Marchaunt I |
| 1388 (Sep) | Richard Crowborough | Thomas White |
| 1390 (Jan) | Richard Bolour | John Mateshale |
| 1390 (Nov) | | |
| 1391 | Thomas Dudmere | William Gillingham II |
| 1393 | William Chylynden | William Osbourne |
| 1394 | | |
| 1395 | Richard Broke | Thomas Taverner |
| 1397 (Jan) | John Plomer II | John Precy |
| 1397 (Sep) | | |
| 1399 | William Frere | John Precy |
| 1401 | Richard Berde | Reynold Shrewsbury |
| 1402 | Thomas Dudmere | Reynold Shrewsbury |
| 1404 (Jan) | Thomas Dunston | William Frere |
| 1404 (Oct) | Thomas Dudmere | Richard Lorkyn |
| 1406 | Thomas Chertsey | Reynold Shrewsbury |
| 1407 | John Everard I | John Bosom |
| 1410 | John Alcate | Thomas Chertsey |
| 1411 | John Everard I | Roger Landford |
| 1413 (Feb) | | |
| 1413 (May) | John Deeping | Roger Landford |
| 1414 (Apr) | | |
| 1414 (Nov) | John Deeping | Richard Lorkyn |
| 1415 | | |
| 1416 (Mar) | Robert Bury | John Potager |
| 1416 (Oct) | | |
| 1417 | Thomas Bolour | John Marchaunt III |
| 1419 | William Hunt I | Robert Kela |
| 1420 | John Draper | Thomas Turner |
| 1421 (May) | | |
| 1421 (Dec) | John Deeping | John Marchaunt III |
| 1510–1523 | No names known | |
| 1529 | Nicholas Hurleston, died and repl. by 1533 by Edmund Page | Robert Fisher |
| 1536 | ? | |
| 1539 | ? | |
| 1542 | ? | |
| 1545 | Sir Thomas Moyle | William Roper |
| 1547 | Sir Thomas Moyle | William Roper |
| 1553 (Mar) | Sir John Norton | Christopher Roper |
| 1553 (Oct) | Sir Thomas Moyle | Robert Darknall |
| 1554 (Apr) | Sir Thomas Moyle | William Roper |
| 1554 (Nov) | William Roper | Edward Baeshe |
| 1555 | Sir George Howard | William Brooke, 10th Baron Cobham |
| 1558 | Hugh Cartwright | Thomas Page |
| 1559 | Edward Baeshe | Thomas Brooke alias Cobham |
| 1562–3 | Edward Baeshe | Richard Watts |
| 1571 | William Holstock | George Catlyn |
| 1572 | George Catelyn | William Partridge, sick and repl. 1579 by Samuel Coxe |
| 1584 | William Brooke alias Cobham | George Byng |
| 1586 | William Brooke alias Cobham | William Lewin |
| 1588 | William Lewin | John Stanhope |
| 1593 | William Lewin | George Chowne |
| 1597 | Sir Edward Hoby | Sir Thomas Walsingham |
| 1601 | Sir Edward Hoby | Sir Thomas Walsingham |
| 1604 | Sir Edward Hoby | Sir Thomas Walsingham |
| 1614 | Sir Edward Hoby | Sir Anthony Aucher refused to serve and replaced by Sir Edwin Sandys |
| 1621–1622 | Sir Thomas Walsingham (younger) | Henry Clerke |
| 1624 | Maximilian Dallison | Sir Thomas Walsingham (younger) |
| 1625 | Henry Clerke | Sir Thomas Walsingham (younger) |
| 1626 | Henry Clerke | Sir Thomas Walsingham (younger) |
| 1628 | Sir Thomas Walsingham (younger) | William Brooke |
| 1629–1640 | No Parliaments summoned | |

=== MPs 1640–1885 ===
| Year | First member | First party | Second member | Second party |
|---|---|---|---|---|
| April 1640 | Sir Thomas Walsingham | | John Clerke | |
| November 1640 | Sir Thomas Walsingham | Parliamentarian | Richard Lee | Parliamentarian |
| December 1648 | Sir Thomas Walsingham | Parliamentarian | Lee excluded in Pride's Purge – seat vacant | |
| 1653 | Rochester was unrepresented in the Barebones Parliament | | | |
| 1654 | John Parker | | Rochester had only one seat in the First and Second Parliaments of the Protectorate | |
| 1656 | John Parker | | Rochester had only one seat in the First and Second Parliaments of the Protectorate | |
| January 1659 | Peter Pett | | Richard Hutchinson | |
| May 1659 | Sir Thomas Walsingham | | One seat vacant | |
| 1660 | Peter Pett | | John Marsham | |
| 1661 | Sir Francis Clerke | | Sir William Batten | |
| 1667 | Sir Francis Clerke | | Sir Richard Head | |
| February 1679 | Sir John Banks | | Sir Richard Head | |
| August 1679 | Sir John Banks | | Francis Barrell | |
| 1681 | Sir John Banks | | Sir Francis Clerke | |
| 1689 | Sir John Banks | | Sir Roger Twisden | |
| 1690 | Sir Joseph Williamson | | Francis Clerke | |
| 1691 | Sir Joseph Williamson | | Caleb Banks | |
| 1695 | Sir Joseph Williamson | | Admiral Sir Cloudesley Shovell | |
| 1701 | Francis Barrell | | William Bokenham | |
| 1702 | Edward Knatchbull | | William Cage | |
| 1705 | Admiral Sir Cloudesley Shovell | | Admiral Sir Stafford Fairborne | |
| 1708 | Admiral Sir John Leake | | Admiral Sir Stafford Fairborne | |
| 1710 | Admiral Sir John Leake | | William Cage | |
| 1715 | Sir Thomas Palmer, Bt | | Admiral Sir John Jennings | |
| 1724 | Sir Thomas Colby | | Admiral Sir John Jennings | |
| 1727 | David Polhill | Whig | Admiral Sir John Jennings | |
| 1734 | David Polhill | Whig | Admiral Nicholas Haddock | |
| 1741 | Admiral Edward Vernon | | Admiral Nicholas Haddock | |
| 1743 | David Polhill | Whig | Admiral Nicholas Haddock | |
| 1746 | David Polhill | Whig | Admiral Sir Chaloner Ogle | |
| 1751 | David Polhill | Whig | Admiral The Hon. John Byng | |
| 1754 | Nicholas Haddock | | Admiral The Hon. John Byng | |
| 1757 | Nicholas Haddock | | Admiral Isaac Townsend | |
| 1761 | Viscount Parker | | Admiral Isaac Townsend | |
| 1764 | Admiral Sir Charles Hardy | | Admiral Isaac Townsend | |
| 1765 | Admiral Sir Charles Hardy | | Grey Cooper | Tory |
| 1768 | John Calcraft | Whig | William Gordon | Tory |
| 1771 | John Calcraft | Whig | Admiral Thomas Pye | Tory |
| 1772 | George Finch-Hatton | Tory | Admiral Thomas Pye | Tory |
| 1774 | George Finch-Hatton | Tory | Robert Gregory | Whig |
| 1784 | Captain Sir Charles Middleton | Whig | Nathaniel Smith | Whig |
| 1790 | George Best | Tory | Admiral Sir Richard Bickerton | Tory |
| 1792 | George Best | Tory | Nathaniel Smith | Whig |
| 1794 | George Best | Tory | Admiral Sir Richard King | Tory |
| 1796 | Hon. Henry Tufton | Whig | Admiral Sir Richard King | Tory |
| 1802 | Captain Sir Sidney Smith | Tory | James Hulkes | Whig |
| 1806 | John Calcraft | Whig | James Barnett | Whig |
| 1807 | John Calcraft | Whig | Sir Thomas Thompson | Tory |
| 1816 | John Calcraft | Whig | James Barnett | Whig |
| 1818 | Lord Binning | Tory | James Barnett | Whig |
| 1820 | Lord Binning | Tory | Ralph Bernal | Whig |
| 1826 | Captain Henry Dundas | Tory | Ralph Bernal | Whig |
| 1830 | George Villiers | Tory | Ralph Bernal | Whig |
| 1831 | John Mills | Tory | Ralph Bernal | Whig |
| 1834 | John Mills | Conservative | Ralph Bernal | Whig |
| 1835 | Thomas Hodges | Whig | Ralph Bernal | Whig |
| 1837 | Thomas Hobhouse | Radical | Ralph Bernal | Whig |
| 1841 | James Douglas Stoddart Douglas | Conservative | William Bodkin | Conservative |
| 1847 | Ralph Bernal | Whig | Thomas Hodges | Whig |
| 1852 | Hon. Francis Child Villiers | Conservative | Sir Thomas Maddock | Conservative |
| 1856 by-election | Philip Wykeham Martin | Radical | Sir Thomas Maddock | Conservative |
| 1857 | Philip Wykeham Martin | Radical | John Alexander Kinglake | Radical |
| 1859 | Philip Wykeham Martin | Liberal | John Alexander Kinglake | Liberal |
| 1870 by-election | Philip Wykeham Martin | Liberal | Julian Goldsmid | Liberal |
| 1878 by-election | Sir Arthur Otway | Liberal | Julian Goldsmid | Liberal |
| 1880 | Sir Arthur Otway | Liberal | Roger Leigh | Conservative |
| 1885 | Representation reduced to one-member | | | |

=== MPs 1885–1918 ===
| Election | Member | Party |
|---|---|---|
| 1885 | Francis Hughes-Hallett | Conservative |
| 1889 by-election | Edward Knatchbull-Hugessen | Liberal |
| 1892 | Horatio Davies | Conservative |
| 1893 by-election | James Gascoyne-Cecil | Conservative |
| 1903 by-election | Charles Tuff | Conservative |
| 1906 | Ernest Lamb | Liberal |
| 1910 | Samuel Forde Ridley | Conservative |
| 1910 | Sir Ernest Lamb | Liberal |
| 1918 | constituency abolished: see Chatham and Gillingham | |

== Elections ==
| Decades: | 1830s; 1840s; 1850s; 1860s; 1870s; 1880s; 1890s; 1900s; 1910s |

=== Elections in the 1830s ===
General election 1830: Rochester
| Party | Candidate | Votes | % | ±% |
|---|---|---|---|---|
| Whig | Ralph Bernal | 429 | 36.2 | |
| Tory | George Child Villiers | 417 | 35.2 | |
| Tory | John Mills | 339 | 28.6 | |
| Turnout | | 778 | c. 74.1 | |
| Registered electors | | c. 1,050 | | |
| Majority | | 12 | 1.0 | |
| Whig hold | | Swing | | |
| Majority | | 78 | 6.6 | |
| Tory hold | | Swing | | |

General election 1831: Rochester
| Party | Candidate | Votes | % |
|---|---|---|---|
| Whig | Ralph Bernal | Unopposed | |
| Tory | John Mills | Unopposed | |
| Registered electors | | c. 1,050 | |
| Whig hold | | | |
| Tory hold | | | |

General election 1832: Rochester
| Party | Candidate | Votes | % |
|---|---|---|---|
| Whig | Ralph Bernal | 354 | 35.5 |
| Tory | John Mills | 350 | 35.1 |
| Whig | George Lewes Newnham Collingwood | 293 | 29.4 |
| Turnout | | 650 | 66.8 |
| Registered electors | | 973 | |
| Majority | | 4 | 0.4 |
| Whig hold | | | |
| Majority | | 57 | 5.7 |
| Tory hold | | | |

General election 1835: Rochester
| Party | Candidate | Votes | % | ±% |
|---|---|---|---|---|
| Whig | Ralph Bernal | 502 | 36.2 | +0.7 |
| Whig | Thomas Twisden Hodges | 443 | 31.9 | +2.5 |
| Conservative | Charles Wellesley | 442 | 31.9 | −3.2 |
| Majority | | 1 | 0.0 | −0.4 |
| Turnout | | 873 | 90.3 | +23.5 |
| Registered electors | | 967 | | |
| Whig hold | | Swing | +1.2 | |
| Whig gain from Conservative | | Swing | +2.1 | |

General election 1837: Rochester
| Party | Candidate | Votes | % | ±% |
|---|---|---|---|---|
| Whig | Ralph Bernal | 489 | 26.9 | −41.2 |
| Radical | Thomas Hobhouse | 473 | 26.0 | N/A |
| Conservative | James Douglas Stoddart Douglas | 445 | 24.5 | +8.6 |
| Conservative | Thomas Best | 412 | 22.6 | +6.7 |
| Turnout | | 913 | 90.0 | −0.3 |
| Registered electors | | 1,015 | | |
| Majority | | 16 | 0.9 | +0.9 |
| Whig hold | | Swing | −28.3 | |
| Majority | | 28 | 1.5 | N/A |
| Radical gain from Whig | | Swing | N/A | |

=== Elections in the 1840s ===
General election 1841: Rochester
| Party | Candidate | Votes | % | ±% |
|---|---|---|---|---|
| Conservative | James Douglas Stoddart Douglas | 541 | 26.7 | +2.2 |
| Conservative | William Bodkin | 499 | 24.6 | +2.0 |
| Whig | William Elliot-Murray-Kynynmound | 497 | 24.5 | +11.1 |
| Whig | Francis Dashwood | 489 | 24.1 | +10.7 |
| Majority | | 2 | 0.1 | N/A |
| Turnout | | 1,019 | 89.5 | −0.5 |
| Registered electors | | 1,139 | | |
| Conservative gain from Radical | | Swing | −4.4 | |
| Conservative gain from Whig | | Swing | −4.5 | |

General election 1847: Rochester
| Party | Candidate | Votes | % | ±% |
|---|---|---|---|---|
| Whig | Ralph Bernal | 637 | 29.2 | +4.7 |
| Whig | Thomas Twisden Hodges | 617 | 28.3 | +4.2 |
| Conservative | William Bodkin | 464 | 21.3 | −3.3 |
| Conservative | James Douglas Stoddart Douglas | 462 | 21.2 | −5.5 |
| Majority | | 153 | 7.0 | N/A |
| Turnout | | 1,090 (est) | 75.1 (est) | −14.4 |
| Registered electors | | 1,451 | | |
| Whig gain from Conservative | | Swing | +4.6 | |
| Whig gain from Conservative | | Swing | +4.3 | |

=== Elections in the 1850s ===
General election 1852: Rochester
| Party | Candidate | Votes | % | ±% |
|---|---|---|---|---|
| Conservative | Francis Child Villiers | 584 | 26.7 | +5.4 |
| Conservative | Thomas Herbert Maddock | 581 | 26.6 | +5.4 |
| Whig | Ralph Bernal | 514 | 23.5 | −5.7 |
| Whig | Thomas Twisden Hodges | 507 | 23.2 | −5.1 |
| Majority | | 67 | 3.1 | N/A |
| Turnout | | 1,093 (est) | 86.1 (est) | +11.0 |
| Registered electors | | 1,269 | | |
| Conservative gain from Whig | | Swing | +5.4 | |
| Conservative gain from Whig | | Swing | +5.4 | |

Villiers resigned, causing a by-election.

By-election, 8 February 1856: Rochester
| Party | Candidate | Votes | % | ±% |
|---|---|---|---|---|
| Radical | Philip Wykeham Martin | 560 | 52.9 | +6.2 |
| Conservative | William Bodkin | 499 | 47.1 | −6.2 |
| Majority | | 61 | 5.8 | N/A |
| Turnout | | 1,059 | 90.5 | +4.4 |
| Registered electors | | 1,170 | | |
| Radical gain from Conservative | | Swing | +6.2 | |

General election 1857: Rochester
| Party | Candidate | Votes | % | ±% |
|---|---|---|---|---|
| Radical | Philip Wykeham Martin | Unopposed | | |
| Radical | John Alexander Kinglake | Unopposed | | |
| Registered electors | | 1,180 | | |
| Radical gain from Conservative | | | | |
| Radical gain from Conservative | | | | |

General election 1859: Rochester
| Party | Candidate | Votes | % | ±% |
|---|---|---|---|---|
| Liberal | Philip Wykeham Martin | 665 | 28.6 | N/A |
| Liberal | John Alexander Kinglake | 662 | 28.5 | N/A |
| Conservative | George Henry Money | 505 | 21.7 | New |
| Conservative | George Mitchell | 493 | 21.2 | New |
| Majority | | 157 | 6.8 | N/A |
| Turnout | | 1,163 (est) | 81.9 (est) | N/A |
| Registered electors | | 1,419 | | |
| Liberal hold | | Swing | N/A | |
| Liberal hold | | Swing | N/A | |

=== Elections in the 1860s ===
General election 1865: Rochester
| Party | Candidate | Votes | % | ±% |
|---|---|---|---|---|
| Liberal | Philip Wykeham Martin | 855 | 41.5 | +12.9 |
| Liberal | John Alexander Kinglake | 792 | 38.4 | +9.9 |
| Conservative | Alfred Smee | 414 | 20.1 | −22.8 |
| Majority | | 378 | 18.3 | +11.5 |
| Turnout | | 1,238 (est) | 84.9 (est) | +3.0 |
| Registered electors | | 1,458 | | |
| Liberal hold | | Swing | +12.4 | |
| Liberal hold | | Swing | +10.7 | |

General election 1868: Rochester
| Party | Candidate | Votes | % | ±% |
|---|---|---|---|---|
| Liberal | Philip Wykeham Martin | 1,458 | 42.1 | +0.6 |
| Liberal | John Alexander Kinglake | 1,305 | 37.7 | −0.7 |
| Conservative | Alfred Smee | 703 | 20.3 | +0.2 |
| Majority | | 602 | 17.4 | −0.9 |
| Turnout | | 2,085 (est) | 81.1 (est) | −3.8 |
| Registered electors | | 2,569 | | |
| Liberal hold | | Swing | +0.3 | |
| Liberal hold | | Swing | −0.4 | |

=== Elections in the 1870s ===
Kinglake's death caused a by-election.

By-election, 19 Jul 1870: Rochester
| Party | Candidate | Votes | % | ±% |
|---|---|---|---|---|
| Liberal | Julian Goldsmid | 987 | 64.2 | −15.6 |
| Ind. Conservative | Charles James Fox | 550 | 35.8 | New |
| Majority | | 437 | 28.4 | +11.0 |
| Turnout | | 1,537 | 59.8 | −21.3 |
| Registered electors | | 2,571 | | |
| Liberal hold | | Swing | N/A | |

General election 1874: Rochester
| Party | Candidate | Votes | % | ±% |
|---|---|---|---|---|
| Liberal | Philip Wykeham Martin | 1,206 | 37.9 | −4.2 |
| Liberal | Julian Goldsmid | 1,144 | 35.9 | −1.8 |
| Conservative | Alfred Smee | 835 | 26.2 | +5.9 |
| Majority | | 309 | 9.7 | −7.7 |
| Turnout | | 2,010 (est) | 75.1 (est) | −6.0 |
| Registered electors | | 2,676 | | |
| Liberal hold | | Swing | −3.6 | |
| Liberal hold | | Swing | −2.4 | |

Martin's death caused a by-election.

By-election, 14 Jun 1878: Rochester
| Party | Candidate | Votes | % | ±% |
|---|---|---|---|---|
| Liberal | Arthur Otway | 1,284 | 56.1 | −17.7 |
| Conservative | Walter Scott Seton-Karr | 1,004 | 43.9 | +17.7 |
| Majority | | 280 | 12.2 | +2.5 |
| Turnout | | 2,288 | 80.8 | +5.7 |
| Registered electors | | 2,832 | | |
| Liberal hold | | Swing | −17.7 | |

=== Elections in the 1880s ===
General election 1880: Rochester
| Party | Candidate | Votes | % | ±% |
|---|---|---|---|---|
| Liberal | Arthur Otway | 1,497 | 27.2 | −10.7 |
| Conservative | Roger Leigh | 1,393 | 25.3 | +12.2 |
| Conservative | Walter Scott Seton-Karr | 1,312 | 23.9 | +10.8 |
| Liberal | Julian Goldsmid | 1,294 | 23.5 | −12.4 |
| Turnout | | 2,748 (est) | 90.8 (est) | +15.7 |
| Registered electors | | 3,026 | | |
| Majority | | 104 | 1.9 | −7.8 |
| Liberal hold | | Swing | −10.8 | |
| Majority | | 99 | 1.8 | N/A |
| Conservative gain from Liberal | | Swing | +12.3 | |

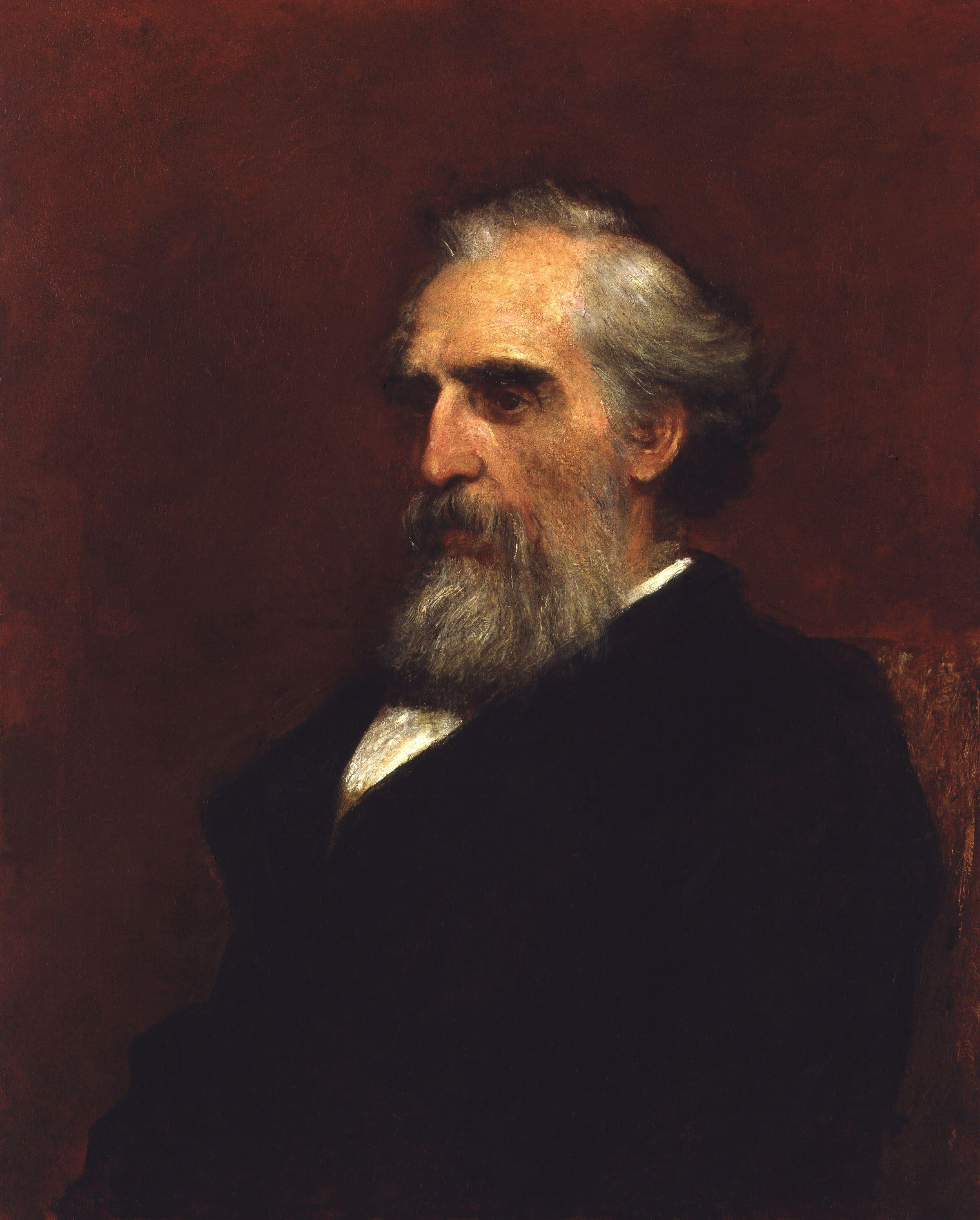
Edwards

General election 1885: Rochester
| Party | Candidate | Votes | % | ±% |
|---|---|---|---|---|
| Conservative | Francis Hughes-Hallett | 1,627 | 54.0 | +4.8 |
| Liberal | John Passmore Edwards | 1,386 | 46.0 | −4.7 |
| Majority | | 241 | 8.0 | +6.2 |
| Turnout | | 3,013 | 91.2 | +0.4 (est) |
| Registered electors | | 3,304 | | |
| Conservative hold | | Swing | +4.7 | |

General election 1886: Rochester
| Party | Candidate | Votes | % | ±% |
|---|---|---|---|---|
| Conservative | Francis Hughes-Hallett | 1,602 | 54.2 | +0.2 |
| Liberal | Francis Flint Belsey | 1,353 | 45.8 | −0.2 |
| Majority | | 249 | 8.4 | +0.4 |
| Turnout | | 2,955 | 89.4 | −1.8 |
| Registered electors | | 3,304 | | |
| Conservative hold | | Swing | +0.2 | |

Hughes-Hallett resigned, causing a by-election.

By-election, 16 Apr 1889: Rochester
| Party | Candidate | Votes | % | ±% |
|---|---|---|---|---|
| Liberal | Edward Knatchbull-Hugessen | 1,655 | 51.2 | +5.4 |
| Conservative | Horatio Davies | 1,580 | 48.8 | −5.4 |
| Majority | | 75 | 2.4 | N/A |
| Turnout | | 3,235 | 91.1 | +1.7 |
| Registered electors | | 3,550 | | |
| Liberal gain from Conservative | | Swing | +5.4 | |

=== Elections in the 1890s ===
Davies

General election 1892: Rochester
| Party | Candidate | Votes | % | ±% |
|---|---|---|---|---|
| Conservative | Horatio Davies | 2,119 | 55.3 | +1.1 |
| Liberal | Frederic Brunning Maddison | 1,712 | 44.7 | −1.1 |
| Majority | | 407 | 10.6 | +2.2 |
| Turnout | | 3,831 | 91.0 | +1.6 |
| Registered electors | | 4,211 | | |
| Conservative hold | | Swing | +1.1 | |

Davies was unseated on petition, causing a by-election.

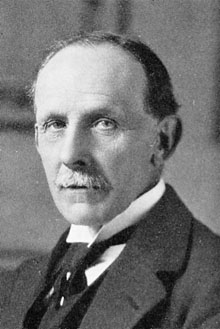
Cranborne

1893 Rochester by-election
| Party | Candidate | Votes | % | ±% |
|---|---|---|---|---|
| Conservative | James Gascoyne-Cecil | Unopposed | | |
| Conservative hold | | | | |

Grenfell

General election 1895: Rochester
| Party | Candidate | Votes | % | ±% |
|---|---|---|---|---|
| Conservative | James Gascoyne-Cecil | 2,152 | 56.3 | +1.0 |
| Liberal | Cecil Grenfell | 1,673 | 43.7 | −1.0 |
| Majority | | 479 | 12.6 | +2.0 |
| Turnout | | 3,825 | 87.4 | −3.6 |
| Registered electors | | 4,378 | | |
| Conservative hold | | Swing | +1.0 | |

=== Elections in the 1900s ===
General election 1900: Rochester
| Party | Candidate | Votes | % | ±% |
|---|---|---|---|---|
| Conservative | James Gascoyne-Cecil | Unopposed | | |
| Conservative hold | | | | |

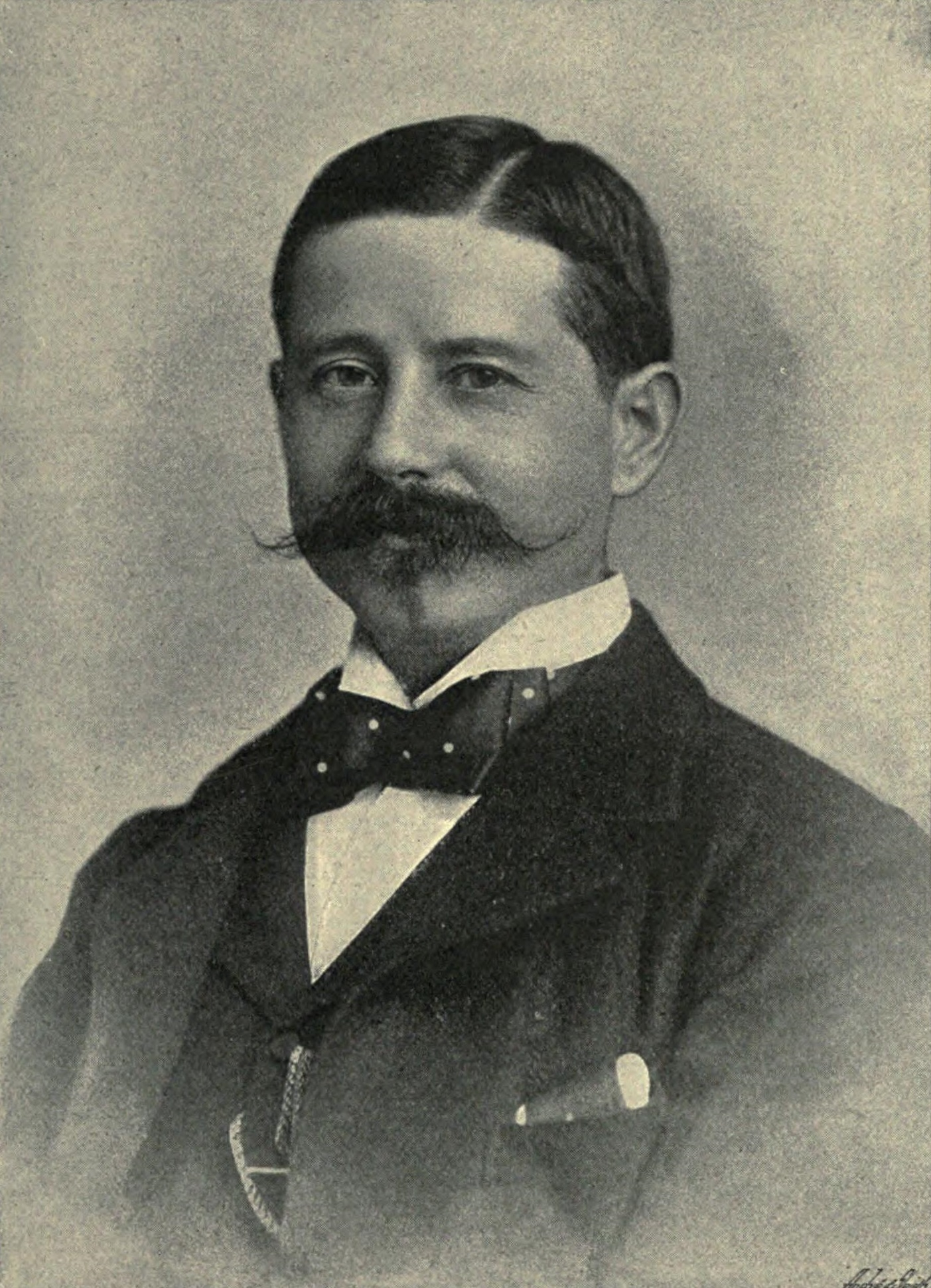
Johnston

1903 Rochester by-election
| Party | Candidate | Votes | % | ±% |
|---|---|---|---|---|
| Conservative | Charles Tuff | 2,504 | 55.8 | N/A |
| Liberal | Harry Johnston | 1,983 | 44.2 | New |
| Majority | | 521 | 11.6 | N/A |
| Turnout | | 4,487 | 86.2 | N/A |
| Registered electors | | 5,206 | | |
| Conservative hold | | | | |

Lamb

General election 1906: Rochester
| Party | Candidate | Votes | % | ±% |
|---|---|---|---|---|
| Liberal | Ernest Lamb | 2,967 | 55.6 | N/A |
| Conservative | Charles Tuff | 2,374 | 44.4 | N/A |
| Majority | | 593 | 11.2 | N/A |
| Turnout | | 5,341 | 92.7 | N/A |
| Registered electors | | 5,763 | | |
| Liberal gain from Conservative | | Swing | N/A | |

=== Elections in the 1910s ===
Forde Ridley

General election January 1910: Rochester
| Party | Candidate | Votes | % | ±% |
|---|---|---|---|---|
| Conservative | Samuel Forde Ridley | 2,675 | 51.3 | +6.9 |
| Liberal | Ernest Lamb | 2,543 | 48.7 | −6.9 |
| Majority | | 132 | 2.6 | N/A |
| Turnout | | 5,218 | 92.7 | +0.0 |
| Registered electors | | 5,629 | | |
| Conservative gain from Liberal | | Swing | +6.9 | |

General election December 1910: Rochester
| Party | Candidate | Votes | % | ±% |
|---|---|---|---|---|
| Liberal | Ernest Lamb | 2,609 | 51.5 | +2.8 |
| Conservative | Samuel Forde Ridley | 2,456 | 48.5 | −2.8 |
| Majority | | 153 | 3.0 | N/A |
| Turnout | | 5,065 | 90.0 | −2.7 |
| Registered electors | | 5,629 | | |
| Liberal gain from Conservative | | Swing | +2.8 | |

General Election 1914–15:

Another General Election was required to take place before the end of 1915. The political parties had been making preparations for an election to take place and by July 1914, the following candidates had been selected;

- Liberal: Ernest Lamb
- Unionist:

== Sources ==
- Robert Beatson, "A Chronological Register of Both Houses of Parliament" (London: Longman, Hurst, Res & Orme, 1807)
- D Brunton & D H Pennington, Members of the Long Parliament (London: George Allen & Unwin, 1954)
- Cobbett's Parliamentary history of England, from the Norman Conquest in 1066 to the year 1803 (London: Thomas Hansard, 1808)
- Maija Jansson (ed.), Proceedings in Parliament, 1614 (House of Commons) (Philadelphia: American Philosophical Society, 1988)
- J E Neale, The Elizabethan House of Commons (London: Jonathan Cape, 1949)
- Leigh Rayment's Historical List of MPs – Constituencies beginning with "R" (part 2)
