= George Chowne =

English politician

George Chowne (died 1616), of Fairlawn, near Wrotham and Little Peckham, Kent, was an English politician.

Chowne was the son of MP, Nicholas Chowne. He was a Member of Parliament (MP) for Rochester in 1593.
