= George Child Villiers, 6th Earl of Jersey =

English peer and politician (1808–1859)

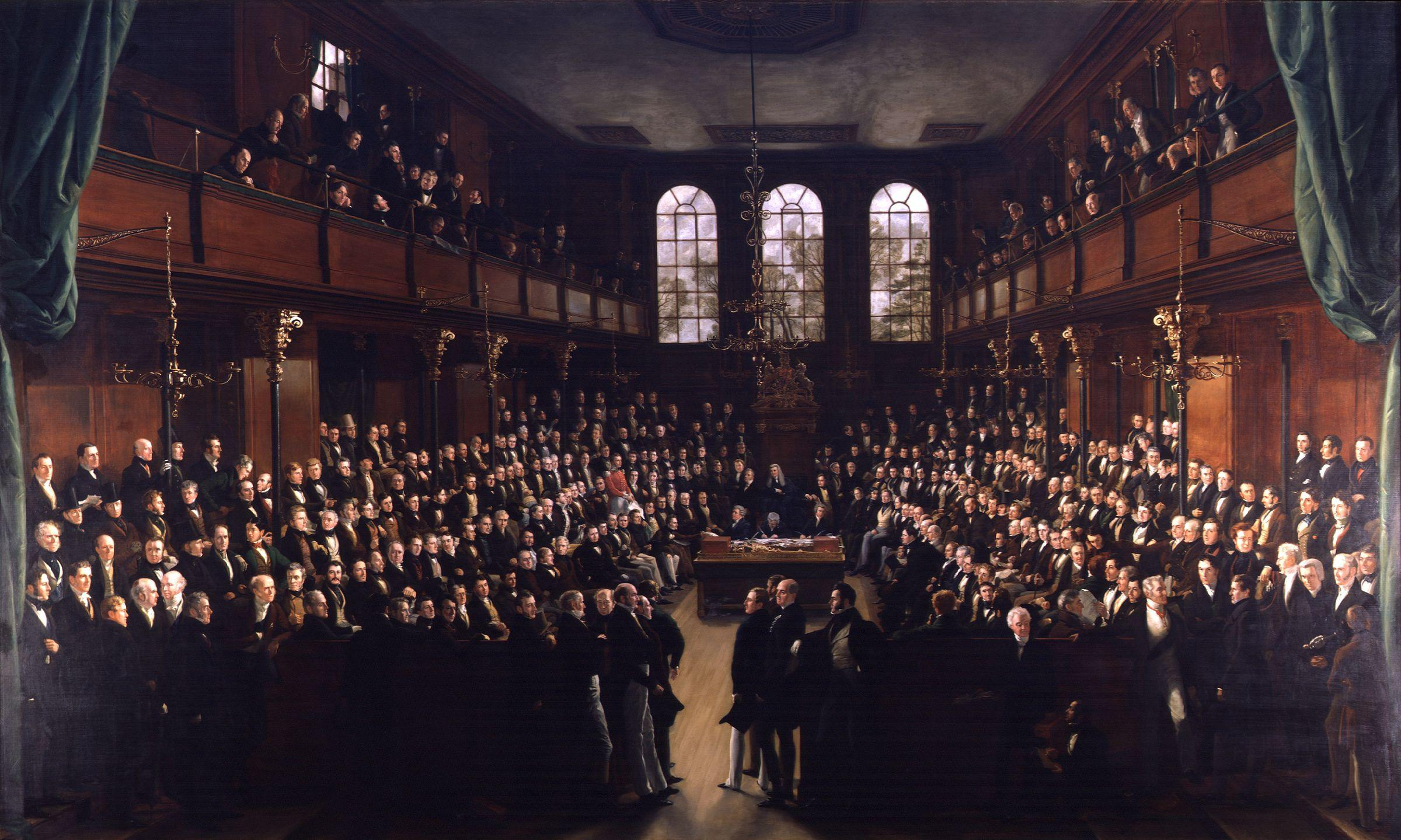
- The House of Commons, 1833 by Sir George Hayter

Member of Parliament for Cirencester
- In office 1844-1852

Member of Parliament for Weymouth & Melcombe Regis
- In office 1837-1842

Member of Parliament for Honiton
- In office 1832-1835

Member of Parliament for Minehead
- In office 1832-1832

Member of Parliament for Rochester
- In office 1830-1831

Personal details
- Born: 4 April 1808
- Died: 24 October 1859 (aged 51)
- Spouse: Julia Peel (m. 1841)
- Children: 3, including Victor
- Parents: George Child Villiers (father); Sarah Fane (mother)
- Relatives: Villiers family

George Augustus Frederick Child Villiers, 6th Earl of Jersey (4 April 1808 – 24 October 1859), styled Viscount Villiers until 1859, was an English peer and politician from the Villiers family.

== Life ==
Villiers was born on 4 April 1808 in London, the son of George Child Villiers, 5th Earl of Jersey, by Lady Sarah Fane.

He sat as Member of Parliament for Rochester from 1830 to 1831, for Minehead from 1831 from 1832, for Honiton from 1832 to 1835, for Weymouth & Melcome Regis from 1837 to 1842 and for Cirencester from 1844 to 1852.

He served as a Lord-in-waiting to the Duchess of Cambridge at the 1838 coronation of Queen Victoria.

== Marriage and issue ==
Lord Jersey married Julia Peel (d. 1893), daughter of the Prime Minister, Sir Robert Peel, on 12 July 1841. They had three children:

- Julia Sarah Alice Child Villiers (d. 1921); she married Sir George Orby Wombwell, 4th Baronet, on 3 September 1861 and had issue
- Caroline Anne Child-Villiers; she married William Henry Philips Jenkins on 4 April 1872
- Victor Albert George Child-Villiers, 7th Earl of Jersey (1845–1915).

He succeeded in the earldom on the death of his father on 3 October 1859 but only held the title until his own death of tuberculosis three weeks later, in Brighton on 24 October 1859, (Note: Deaths Dec 1859 Villiers George Augustus Frederick Brighton 2b 109) and was buried in Middleton Stoney, Oxfordshire.

Lady Jersey married Charles Brandling on 12 September 1865.

== See also ==
- Jersey Street (Boston), which is named in honour of Villiers

== Notes ==
Parliament of the United Kingdom
Preceded by Henry Dundas; Ralph Bernal	Member of Parliament for Rochester; 1830–1831; With: Ralph Bernal	Succeeded by John Mills; Ralph Bernal
Preceded by John Fownes Luttrell; William Edward Tomline	Member of Parliament for Minehead; 1831–1832; With: John Fownes Luttrell	Constituency abolished
Preceded by Sir George Warrender; Henry Baines Lott	Member of Parliament for Honiton; 1832–1835; With: James Ruddell-Todd	Succeeded by Hugh Duncan Baillie; Arthur Chichester
Preceded by Fowell Buxton; William Wharton Burden	Member of Parliament for Weymouth & Melcombe Regis; 1837–1842; With: George William Hope	Succeeded by Ralph Bernal; William Dougal Christie
Preceded by William Cripps; Thomas Chester-Master	Member of Parliament for Cirencester; 1844–1852; With: William Cripps 1844–1848; Joseph Randolph Mullings 1848–1852	Succeeded by Ashley Ponsonby; Joseph Randolph Mullings
Peerage of England
Preceded by George Child Villiers	Earl of Jersey; 3–24 October 1859	Succeeded by Victor Child Villiers
