= Arthur Otway =

British soldier, barrister and politician

The Right Honourable Sir Arthur Otway Bt
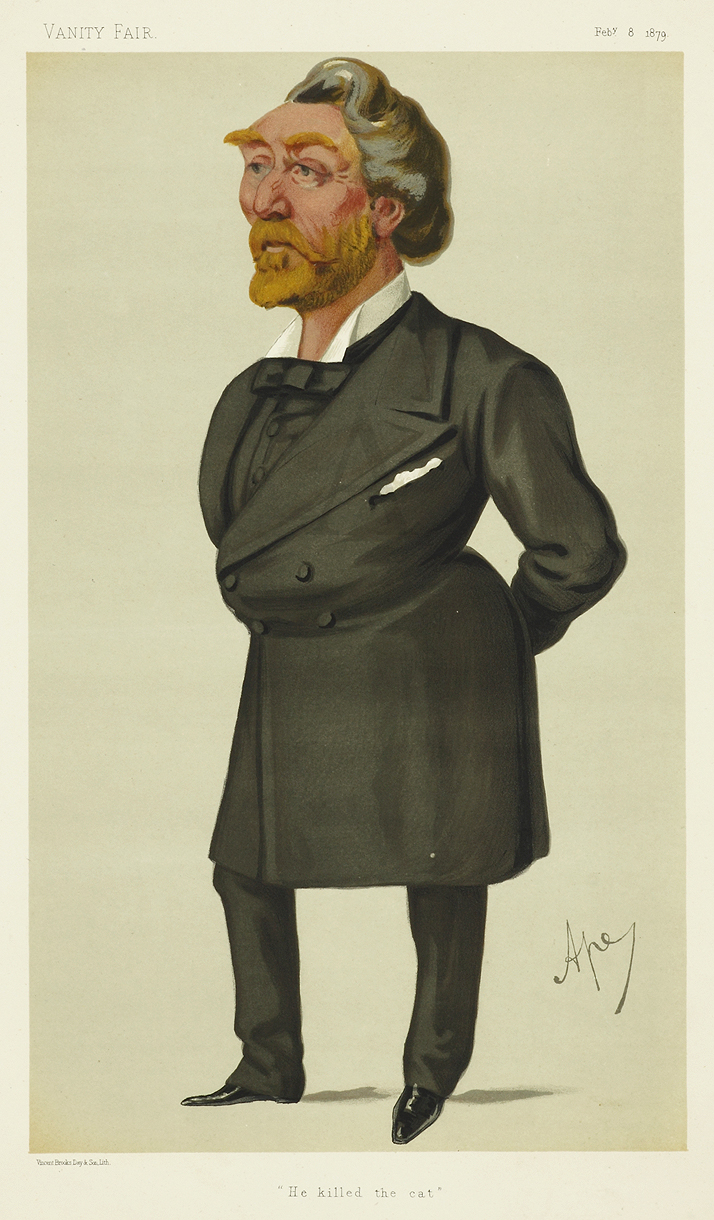
- "He killed the cat". Otway as caricatured by Ape (Carlo Pellegrini) in Vanity Fair, February 1879.

Under-Secretary of State for Foreign Affairs
- In office 12 December 1868 – 9 January 1871
- Monarch: Victoria
- Prime Minister: William Ewart Gladstone
- Preceded by: Edward Egerton
- Succeeded by: Viscount Enfield

Personal details
- Born: 8 August 1822 Edinburgh, Scotland
- Died: 8 June 1912 (aged 89) Eaton Square, London
- Party: Liberal
- Spouse: Henrietta Langham (d. 1909)
- Education: Royal Military College, Sandhurst

Sir Arthur John Otway, 3rd Baronet PC (8 August 1822 – 8 June 1912) was a British barrister and Liberal politician as well as a champion of administrative reform regarding India.

== Background, education and early life ==
Otway was born in Edinburgh, Scotland, the fourth son of Admiral Sir Robert Otway, 1st Baronet. He was brought up along with the rest of his family in Kemp Town, an estate of Brighton, England. At the age of six, he began his education at Marlborough Place. Following that, he travelled to France and Germany, and eventually began education at the Royal Military College, Sandhurst. Naturally, his first career was in the military. In 1839, he signed on as an ensign of the 51st Yorkshire Light Infantry, which was then stationed in Australia. After two years' service, he was promoted to the 2nd Queen's Regiment, stationed in India. He served with that regiment for approximately five more years, until 1846, at which time he retired from the Army. After his time in the military, he began to study law at the Middle Temple, one of London's four Inns of Court; in 1850 he was called to the Bar.

== Political career ==
Before Otway had held his first brief, however, he began to perceive a need for reform in government, especially regarding the handling of the administration of India. He joined other notables of the time such as John Bright in forming the India Reform Society. Subsequently, he entered public office as a Liberal member of Parliament (MP) for Stafford. He represented that borough from 1852 to 1857. Later, he sat for Chatham from 1865 to 1874 and Rochester from 1878 to 1885.

At the end of 1868, three years into his term as MP of Chatham, Otway was appointed to William Ewart Gladstone's first Government in the post of Under-Secretary of State for Foreign Affairs. He served for three years in that post. His chief was Lord Clarendon, the Secretary of State for Foreign Affairs. Lord Clarendon died on 19 July 1870, the eve of the Franco-Prussian War and was succeeded by Lord Granville. The months that followed were filled with anxiety for all representatives of the Foreign Office, until the war's end in 1871. Otway retired from said post in that year over matters of opinion connected to Russia's treatment of the Black Sea Treaty in the Crimean War.

In 1878, Otway was elected as the MP for Rochester. In 1881, he succeeded his brother as third baronet. Five years later, in 1883, he was appointed Deputy Speaker and Chairman of Ways and Means. He held his post as chairman until 1885, the year he retired from Parliamentary life entirely. In that same year, he became a Privy Councillor.

== Business activities ==
Otway was chairman of the Brighton and South Coast Railway Company. In 1882 he was involved in establishing the Faure Electric Accumulator Company of which he was a founding director.

== Family ==
Otway married Henrietta Langham, daughter of Sir James Langham, on 13 September 1851. They had three children, Henrietta Evelyn Marianne Otway, Phoebe Eleanora Otway and Waller Angelo Otway. His only son, Waller, died unmarried in 1884. His wife died in 1909. Otway survived her by three years and died at 34 Eaton Square, London, in June 1912, aged 89. The baronetcy became extinct on his death.

Parliament of the United Kingdom
Preceded by David Urquhart; Thomas Sidney	Member of Parliament for Stafford; 1852–1857; With: John Ayshford Wise	Succeeded by John Ayshford Wise; Viscount Ingestre
Preceded by Sir Frederick Smith	Member of Parliament for Chatham; 1865–1874	Succeeded by George Elliot
Preceded by Philip Wykeham Martin; Julian Goldsmid	Member of Parliament for Rochester; 1878–1885; With: Julian Goldsmid 1878–1880; Roger Leigh 1880–1885	Succeeded by Francis Hughes-Hallett
Preceded by Lyon Playfair	Chairman of Ways and Means; 1883–1885	Succeeded by Leonard Courtney
Political offices
Preceded by Edward Egerton	Under-Secretary of State for Foreign Affairs; 1868–1871	Succeeded by Viscount Enfield
Baronetage of the United Kingdom
Preceded by George Graham Otway	Baronet (of Brighthelmstone); 1881–1912	Extinct
