= John Bosom (MP for Rochester) =

15th-century English politician

John Bosom (fl. 1407) was an English politician.

He was a member (MP) of the parliament of England for Rochester in 1407. Nothing more is recorded of him.
