= Thomas Herbert Maddock =

Sir Thomas Herbert Maddock (18 May 1792 – 15 January 1870) was a British civil servant in India and a Conservative politician who sat in the House of Commons from 1852 to 1857.

== Life ==
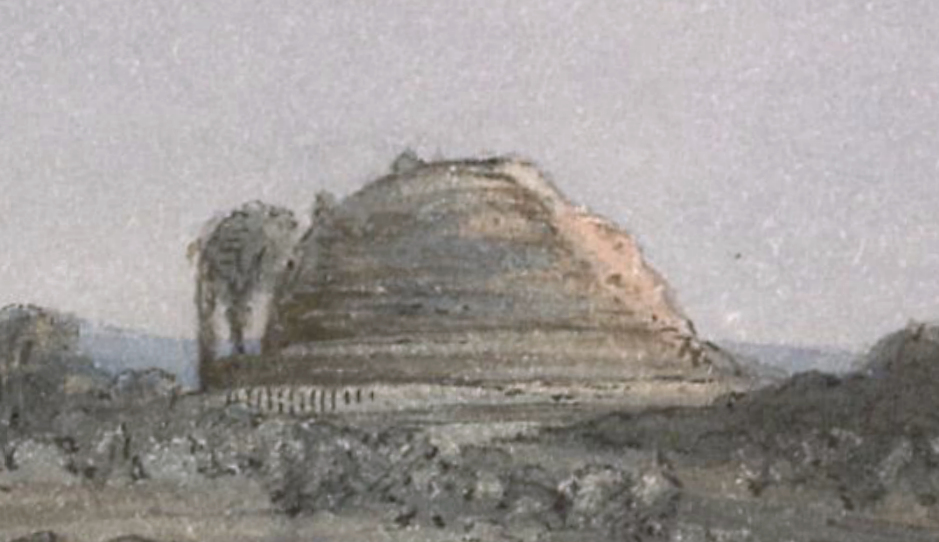
The Great Stupa at Sanchi, as breached by Maddock in 1822.

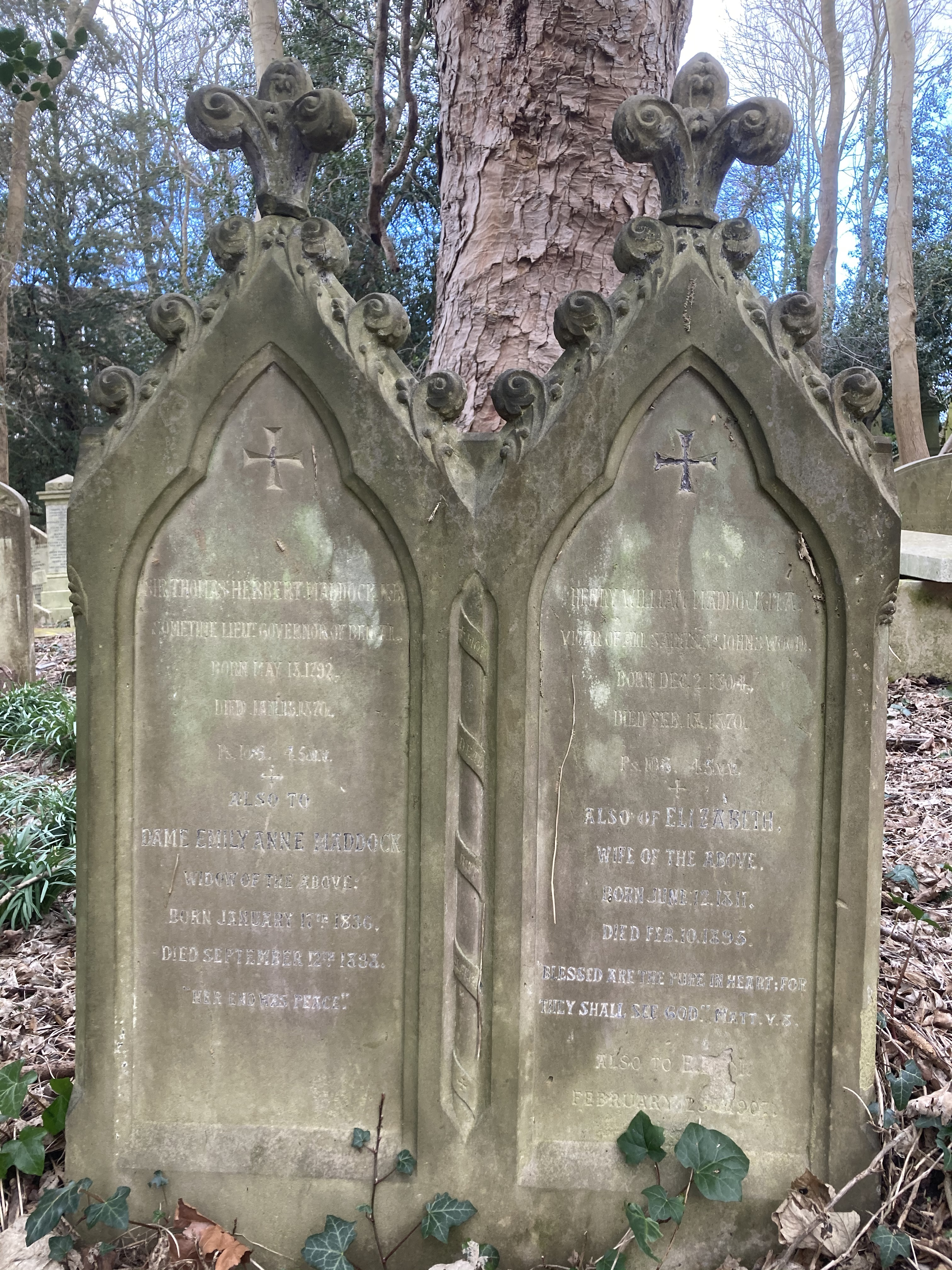
Grave of Thomas Herbert Maddock in Highgate Cemetery

Maddock was the son of the Rev. Thomas Maddock and Emily Anne Scott, daughter of Rokeby Scott of Chester. He was educated at Manchester School. In 1811, he entered the Civil Service of the East India Company's Bengal Presidency. In 1822, Maddock clumsily breached the Great Stupa at Sanchi, although he was not able to reach the center, and he then abandoned.

He was Secretary to the Government of India from 1838 to 1843, and was knighted by patent on 25 April 1844. From 1845 to 1849 he was Deputy Governor of Bengal and President of the Council of India.

Maddock was elected at the 1852 general election as a member of parliament (MP) for Rochester, but did not stand again in 1857.

Maddock died in London aged 77 and was buried in Highgate Cemetery.

Parliament of the United Kingdom
Preceded by Ralph Bernal; Thomas Twisden Hodges	Member of Parliament for Rochester; 1852 – 1857; With: Hon. Francis Child Villiers; Philip Wykeham Martin	Succeeded by Philip Wykeham Martin; John Alexander Kinglake
