= Listed buildings in Dover =

Historic structures in Kent, England

Dover is a town and civil parish in the Dover District of Kent, England. It contains four grade I, eleven II*, 118 grade II listed buildings that are recorded in the National Heritage List for England.

This list is based on the information retrieved online from Historic England

== Key ==
Grade	Criteria
I	Buildings that are of exceptional interest
II*	Particularly important buildings of more than special interest
II	Buildings that are of special interest

== Listing ==
Name	Grade	Location	Type	Completed (Note: The date given is the date used by Historic England as significant for the initial building or that of an important part in the structure's description.)	Date designated	Grid ref. (Note: The grid reference is based on the British national grid reference system, sometimes known as OSGB36, used by the Ordnance Survey.) Geo-coordinates	Notes	Entry number (Note: The "List Entry Number" is a unique number assigned to each listed building and scheduled monument by Historic England.)	Image	Wikidata
Unitarian Church and Vestry Adjoining	II	Adrian Street			17 December 1973	TR3189241281; 51°07′26″N 1°18′45″E		1343832	Upload Photo	Q26627601
1-15, Atholl Terrace	II	1-15, Atholl Terrace			17 December 1973	TR3287141648; 51°07′36″N 1°19′36″E		1069520	Upload Photo	Q26322588
Medieval Undercroft at Number 10 Bench Street	II	Bench Street			30 June 1949	TR3198941283; 51°07′26″N 1°18′50″E		1343833	Upload Photo	Q26627602
Garden of Remembrance Outside Maison Dieu House	II*	Biggin Street			9 January 2012	TR3164041708; 51°07′40″N 1°18′33″E		1406098	Upload Photo	Q26675819
Maison Dieu House	II*	Biggin Street			30 June 1949	TR3165241724; 51°07′41″N 1°18′34″E		1069521	Upload Photo	Q99735497
Nos 1 to 9 Including Basement Area Railings	II	1-9, Cambridge Terrace, New Bridge			14 November 1988	TR3202141206; 51°07′23″N 1°18′51″E		1273277	Upload Photo	Q26563035
1-4, Camden Crescent	II	1-4, Camden Crescent			17 December 1973	TR3206341223; 51°07′24″N 1°18′54″E		1343834	Upload Photo	Q26627603
The Parish Church of St Mary the Virgin	II*	Cannon Street			30 June 1949	TR3192041516; 51°07′33″N 1°18′47″E		1069522	Upload Photo	Q19587196
Remains of St James's Church	II	Castle Hill Road			30 June 1949	TR3226141553; 51°07′34″N 1°19′05″E		1070325	Upload Photo	Q16246351
3, Castle Hill Road	II	3, Castle Hill Road			17 December 1973	TR3219641596; 51°07′36″N 1°19′01″E		1343795	Upload Photo	Q26627567
4 and 6, Castle Hill Road	II	4 and 6, Castle Hill Road			17 December 1973	TR3221841624; 51°07′36″N 1°19′02″E		1069523	Upload Photo	Q26322590
Nos. 5, 5a and 5b Castle Hill Road	II	5, 5a and 5b Castle Hill Road			22 September 2014	TR3219941592; 51°07′35″N 1°19′01″E		1422135	Upload Photo	Q26676925
Castle Hill House	II*	7, Castle Hill Road			30 June 1949	TR3222041565; 51°07′35″N 1°19′02″E		1069524	Upload Photo	Q26263416
9 and 10, Castle Hill Road	II	9 and 10, Castle Hill Road			17 December 1973	TR3224941585; 51°07′35″N 1°19′04″E		1343796	Upload Photo	Q26627568
11, Castle Hill Road	II	11, Castle Hill Road			17 December 1973	TR3225941586; 51°07′35″N 1°19′04″E		1069525	Upload Photo	Q26322592
12 and 13, Castle Hill Road	II	12 and 13, Castle Hill Road			17 December 1973	TR3226341585; 51°07′35″N 1°19′05″E		1343797	Upload Photo	Q26627569
Ardmore Hotel	II	18, Castle Hill Road			14 November 1988	TR3229541574; 51°07′35″N 1°19′06″E		1273303	Upload Photo	Q26563058
1, 3 and 5, Castle Street	II	1, 3 and 5, Castle Street			17 December 1973	TR3217441630; 51°07′37″N 1°19′00″E		1115655	Upload Photo	Q26409354
16-32, Castle Street	II	16-32, Castle Street			17 December 1973	TR3212641560; 51°07′35″N 1°18′58″E		1069527	Upload Photo	Q26322596
31-53, Castle Street	II	31-53, Castle Street			17 December 1973	TR3208741561; 51°07′35″N 1°18′56″E		1115627	Upload Photo	Q26409328
34 and 36, Castle Street	II	34 and 36, Castle Street			17 December 1973	TR3209841539; 51°07′34″N 1°18′56″E		1343798	Upload Photo	Q26627570
38, Castle Street	II	38, Castle Street			17 December 1973	TR3208541522; 51°07′33″N 1°18′55″E		1320334	Upload Photo	Q26606344
40, Castle Street	II	40, Castle Street			17 December 1973	TR3208041520; 51°07′33″N 1°18′55″E		1069528	Upload Photo	Q26322598
42, 44 and 46, Castle Street	II	42, 44 and 46, Castle Street			30 June 1949	TR3207041508; 51°07′33″N 1°18′55″E		1343799	Upload Photo	Q26627571
48-58, Castle Street	II	48-58, Castle Street			17 December 1973	TR3206741506; 51°07′33″N 1°18′54″E		1115624	Upload Photo	Q26409325
52, Charlton Green	II	52, Charlton Green			17 December 1973	TR3141342223; 51°07′57″N 1°18′23″E		1069529	Upload Photo	Q26322600
Cinque Port Arms	II	Clarence Place			27 April 2010	TR3179740377; 51°06′57″N 1°18′38″E		1393764	Upload Photo	Q26672908
Buckland House	II	Crabble Hill			1 February 1971	TR3043042937; 51°08′21″N 1°17′34″E		1115552	Upload Photo	Q26409267
Castle Inn	II	Dolphin Lane			17 December 1973	TR3211141464; 51°07′31″N 1°18′57″E		1069532	Upload Photo	Q26322606
Church of St Mary Sub-castro	I	Dover Castle			7 March 1974	TR3262941822; 51°07′42″N 1°19′24″E		1070328	Church of St Mary Sub-castro More images	Q7594625
Dover Castle	I	Dover Castle			7 March 1974	TR3248041948; 51°07′47″N 1°19′17″E		1070326	Dover Castle More images	Q950970
House Adjoining Peverells Tower	II	Dover Castle			7 March 1974	TR3246241851; 51°07′43″N 1°19′16″E		1070327	Upload Photo	Q26324104
Queen Elizabeths Pocket Pistol	II	Dover Castle			7 March 1975	TR3252741709; 51°07′39″N 1°19′19″E		1258542	Upload Photo	Q16931240
The Roman Pharos	I	Dover Castle			7 March 1974	TR3260441815; 51°07′42″N 1°19′23″E		1258537	The Roman Pharos More images	Q3715786
Wall Along Effingham Street	II	Dover College, Effingham Crescent			17 December 1973	TR3156441566; 51°07′36″N 1°18′29″E		1069498	Upload Photo	Q26322548
Eastern Arm	II	Dover Harbour			16 December 2009	TR3400841669; 51°07′35″N 1°20′34″E		1393604	Upload Photo	Q26672756
The Prince of Wales Pier	II	Dover Harbour			1 December 1975	TR3233840488; 51°07′00″N 1°19′06″E		1259038	Upload Photo	Q26550201
Administration Block	II	Dover Young Offenders Institution, Western Heights			8 July 1998	TR3093440433; 51°07′00″N 1°17′54″E		1375598	Upload Photo	Q26656369
Grand Shaft Stairs and Attached Railings	II	Drop Redoubt Road, Western Heights			8 July 1998	TR3160540907; 51°07′14″N 1°18′29″E		1375599	Upload Photo	Q26656370
K6 Telephone Kiosk	II	East Cliff			20 February 1989	TR3289841644; 51°07′36″N 1°19′37″E		1363216	Upload Photo	Q26686938
1, East Cliff	II	1, East Cliff			28 November 1990	TR3265941508; 51°07′32″N 1°19′25″E		1363215	Upload Photo	Q26645052
Dane House	II	3, East Cliff			28 November 1990	TR3267341518; 51°07′32″N 1°19′26″E		1259026	Upload Photo	Q26550192
Life-boat Lodge	II	4, East Cliff			28 November 1990	TR3268041522; 51°07′32″N 1°19′26″E		1070299	Upload Photo	Q26324036
2, East Cliff Terrace	II	2, East Cliff Terrace			17 December 1973	TR3266741513; 51°07′32″N 1°19′25″E		1115492	Upload Photo	Q26409215
7, East Cliff Terrace	II	7, East Cliff Terrace			17 December 1973	TR3270441539; 51°07′33″N 1°19′27″E		1069533	Upload Photo	Q26322608
8, 9 and 10, East Cliff Terrace	II	8, 9 and 10, East Cliff Terrace			17 December 1973	TR3271241540; 51°07′33″N 1°19′28″E		1069534	Upload Photo	Q26322610
11, East Cliff Terrace	II	11, East Cliff Terrace			17 December 1973	TR3273541552; 51°07′33″N 1°19′29″E		1115472	Upload Photo	Q26409199
12, East Cliff Terrace	II	12, East Cliff Terrace			17 December 1973	TR3274641554; 51°07′33″N 1°19′29″E		1069535	Upload Photo	Q26322612
13-16, East Cliff Terrace	II	13-16, East Cliff Terrace			17 December 1973	TR3275341558; 51°07′34″N 1°19′30″E		1115484	Upload Photo	Q26409208
17-20, East Cliff Terrace	II	17-20, East Cliff Terrace			17 December 1973	TR3279041569; 51°07′34″N 1°19′32″E		1069536	Upload Photo	Q26322614
21-27, East Cliff Terrace	II	21-27, East Cliff Terrace			17 December 1973	TR3280641584; 51°07′34″N 1°19′33″E		1069493	Upload Photo	Q26322541
28, 29 and 30, East Cliff Terrace	II	28, 29 and 30, East Cliff Terrace			30 June 1949	TR3286041605; 51°07′35″N 1°19′35″E		1343818	Upload Photo	Q26627589
31, East Cliff Terrace	II	31, East Cliff Terrace			17 December 1973	TR3287041616; 51°07′35″N 1°19′36″E		1069494	Upload Photo	Q26322543
32, East Cliff Terrace	II	32, East Cliff Terrace			17 December 1973	TR3286341627; 51°07′36″N 1°19′36″E		1069495	Upload Photo	Q26322544
Library Dover College	II*	Effingham Crescent			30 June 1949	TR3147741529; 51°07′34″N 1°18′24″E		1069497	Upload Photo	Q99671052
Ruins of Cloisters to West of the Refectory of St Martins Priory Dover College	II*	Effingham Crescent			30 June 1949	TR3152241560; 51°07′35″N 1°18′27″E		1069496	Upload Photo	Q17557477
School Chapel Dover College	II*	Effingham Crescent			30 June 1949	TR3143641624; 51°07′38″N 1°18′22″E		1343820	Upload Photo	Q17557877
School House	II	Effingham Crescent			17 December 1973	TR3147041647; 51°07′38″N 1°18′24″E		1343821	Upload Photo	Q26627590
The School Hall Dover College	II*	Effingham Crescent			30 June 1949	TR3154241582; 51°07′36″N 1°18′28″E		1343819	Upload Photo	Q17557875
11 to 18 Including Front Garden Area Walls and Gatepiers, 11-18, Effingham Crescent	II	11 To 18 Including Front Garden Area Walls And Gatepiers, 11-18, Effingham Crescent			14 November 1988	TR3159041661; 51°07′39″N 1°18′30″E		1070333	Upload Photo	Q26324114
Former Tram Shelter at Junction with Elms Vale Road	II	Folkestone Road			1 November 1988	TR3070741164; 51°07′24″N 1°17′44″E		1070298	Upload Photo	Q26324034
Great Farthingloe Farmhouse	II	Folkestone Road			17 December 1973	TR2971040418; 51°07′01″N 1°16′51″E		1115131	Upload Photo	Q26408881
World War II Air Raid Wardens' Post at Dover Priory Station	II	Folkestone Road			10 March 2008	TR3139841425; 51°07′31″N 1°18′20″E		1392469	Upload Photo	Q26671686
37, Folkestone Road	II	37, Folkestone Road, CT17 9RZ			17 December 1973	TR3160641481; 51°07′33″N 1°18′31″E		1343822	Upload Photo	Q26627591
Dover Town Hall, including the remains of the medieval Maison Dieu	I	High Street			17 December 1973	TR3162941751; 51°07′41″N 1°18′33″E		1069499	Upload Photo	Q17557482
Royal Victoria Hospital (block Dated 1849)	II	High Street			17 December 1973	TR3155641806; 51°07′43″N 1°18′29″E		1139048	Upload Photo	Q26432002
1-19, High Street	II	1-19, High Street			17 December 1973	TR3160641700; 51°07′40″N 1°18′31″E		1343823	Upload Photo	Q26627592
19a, High Street	II	19a, High Street			17 December 1973	TR3151541782; 51°07′43″N 1°18′27″E		1139020	Upload Photo	Q26431979
71-81, High Street	II	71-81, High Street			17 December 1973	TR3140241894; 51°07′46″N 1°18′21″E		1069500	Upload Photo	Q26322550
83-105, High Street	II	83-105, High Street			17 December 1973	TR3135541947; 51°07′48″N 1°18′19″E		1069501	Upload Photo	Q26322552
Admiralty Pier and Associated Structures	II	Including Admiralty Pier Lighthouse			16 December 2009	TR3245339952; 51°06′42″N 1°19′11″E		1393608	Upload Photo	Q26672759
Cruise Terminal 1	II	Including Attached Pedestrian Walkway, War Memorial, And Four K6 Telephone Kiosks, Lord Warden Square, CT17 9EQ			22 June 1989	TR3206740180; 51°06′50″N 1°18′51″E		1273179	Upload Photo	Q26562953
Wellington Dock and Associated Structures	II	Including Crane Situated On Esplanade Quay			16 December 2009	TR3195541093; 51°07′20″N 1°18′48″E		1393605	Upload Photo	Q26672757
Former Regimental Institute	II	Knights Road, Dover Castle			8 July 1998	TR3253841699; 51°07′38″N 1°19′19″E		1375600	Upload Photo	Q26656371
South Kent College Ladywell Annexe	II	Ladywell Street			11 December 1996	TR3165141777; 51°07′42″N 1°18′34″E		1259411	Upload Photo	Q26550527
1 and 2, Laureston Place	II	1 and 2, Laureston Place			17 December 1973	TR3223341653; 51°07′37″N 1°19′03″E		1069503	Upload Photo	Q26322556
3 and 4, Laureston Place	II	3 and 4, Laureston Place			17 December 1973	TR3223141667; 51°07′38″N 1°19′03″E		1139456	Upload Photo	Q26432327
5 and 6, Laureston Place	II	5 and 6, Laureston Place			12 February 1987	TR3222941679; 51°07′38″N 1°19′03″E		1070331	Upload Photo	Q26324111
7, 8 and 9, Laureston Place	II	7, 8 and 9, Laureston Place			12 February 1987	TR3222641688; 51°07′39″N 1°19′03″E		1258720	Upload Photo	Q26549926
10 and 11, Laureston Place	II	10 and 11, Laureston Place			12 February 1987	TR3222241704; 51°07′39″N 1°19′03″E		1070332	Upload Photo	Q26324113
Former Buckland Flour Mill (adjoining Number 110 to the Left)	II	London Road			17 December 1973	TR3091842489; 51°08′06″N 1°17′58″E		1343826	Upload Photo	Q26627595
Parish Church of St Andrew Buckland	II*	London Road			30 June 1949	TR3049142729; 51°08′15″N 1°17′36″E		1069505	Upload Photo	Q17557485
110, London Road	II	110, London Road			5 September 1969	TR3095242450; 51°08′05″N 1°17′59″E		1069504	Upload Photo	Q26322558
115 and 116, London Road	II	115 and 116, London Road			17 December 1973	TR3086342518; 51°08′07″N 1°17′55″E		1329713	Upload Photo	Q26614951
226, 227 and 228, London Road	II	226, 227 and 228, London Road			17 December 1973	TR3089442460; 51°08′05″N 1°17′56″E		1343827	Upload Photo	Q26627596
229, London Road	II	229, London Road			17 December 1973	TR3087042430; 51°08′04″N 1°17′55″E		1145846	Upload Photo	Q26438991
250-254, London Road	II	250-254, London Road			17 December 1973	TR3102542328; 51°08′01″N 1°18′03″E		1069506	Upload Photo	Q26322560
263 and 264, London Road	II	263 and 264, London Road			17 December 1973	TR3107042283; 51°07′59″N 1°18′05″E		1318925	Upload Photo	Q26605033
265-268, London Road	II	265-268, London Road			17 December 1973	TR3107742278; 51°07′59″N 1°18′05″E		1343828	Upload Photo	Q26627597
269 and 270, London Road	II	269 and 270, London Road			17 December 1973	TR3109042265; 51°07′59″N 1°18′06″E		1069507	Upload Photo	Q26322562
279 and 280, London Road	II	279 and 280, London Road			17 December 1973	TR3112542234; 51°07′58″N 1°18′08″E		1145851	Upload Photo	Q26438998
281-284, London Road	II	281-284, London Road			17 December 1973	TR3113142228; 51°07′58″N 1°18′08″E		1069508	Upload Photo	Q26322564
287, London Road	II	287, London Road			17 December 1973	TR3114842193; 51°07′56″N 1°18′09″E		1318893	Upload Photo	Q26605004
288-293, London Road	II	288-293, London Road			17 December 1973	TR3116342192; 51°07′56″N 1°18′10″E		1069509	Upload Photo	Q26322566
York House	II	294, London Road			17 December 1973	TR3118942174; 51°07′56″N 1°18′11″E		1069510	Upload Photo	Q26322568
Buckland Place	II	295-300, London Road			17 December 1973	TR3119342170; 51°07′56″N 1°18′11″E		1145856	Upload Photo	Q26439005
Charlton Place	II	301 and 302, London Road			17 December 1973	TR3121342142; 51°07′55″N 1°18′12″E		1069511	Upload Photo	Q26322570
303 and 304, London Road	II	303 and 304, London Road			17 December 1973	TR3122242130; 51°07′54″N 1°18′12″E		1069512	Upload Photo	Q26322572
305, 306 and 307, London Road	II	305, 306 and 307, London Road			17 December 1973	TR3123042116; 51°07′54″N 1°18′13″E		1145864	Upload Photo	Q26439015
308-315, London Road	II	308-315, London Road			17 December 1973	TR3124442099; 51°07′53″N 1°18′14″E		1069513	Upload Photo	Q26322574
Lord Warden House	II	Lord Warden Square			17 December 1973	TR3189440330; 51°06′55″N 1°18′43″E		1115595	Upload Photo	Q26409299
1, Maison Dieu Road	II	1, Maison Dieu Road			17 December 1973	TR3211741586; 51°07′35″N 1°18′57″E		1069526	Upload Photo	Q26322594
Eastbrook Place	II	2-6, Maison Dieu Road			17 December 1973	TR3212441629; 51°07′37″N 1°18′58″E		1363227	Upload Photo	Q26645063
St Marys Convent	II	7 and 8, Maison Dieu Road			17 December 1973	TR3210041661; 51°07′38″N 1°18′56″E		1363228	Upload Photo	Q26645064
The Market Hall	II	Market Square			21 August 1973	TR3194241370; 51°07′29″N 1°18′48″E		1363229	Upload Photo	Q26645065
New Bridge House	II	New Bridge Street			17 December 1973	TR3204641222; 51°07′24″N 1°18′53″E		1070321	Upload Photo	Q26324096
1-10, Norman Street	II	1-10, Norman Street			14 November 1988	TR3162441600; 51°07′37″N 1°18′32″E		1363193	Upload Photo	Q26645030
Nos 11 to 19 Including Front Garden Area Walls and Gatepiers	II	11-19, Norman Street			14 November 1988	TR3157641618; 51°07′37″N 1°18′29″E		1070334	Upload Photo	Q26324116
Old Charlton Cemetery Chapels	II	Old Charlton Road			13 February 1991	TR3171142774; 51°08′14″N 1°18′39″E		1243720	Upload Photo	Q26536386
Dwarf Wall	II	Piers And Lamps To Steps Beneath Officers Barracks, Queen Elizabeth Road, Dover Castle			8 July 1998	TR3272241693; 51°07′38″N 1°19′29″E		1375602	Upload Photo	Q26656373
Whitehall Dairy and Whitehall Cottage	II	Primrose Road			18 May 2001	TR3036042182; 51°07′57″N 1°17′28″E		1271518	Upload Photo	Q26561461
1-17, Priory Road	II	1-17, Priory Road			14 November 1988	TR3162641652; 51°07′38″N 1°18′32″E		1258918	Upload Photo	Q26550098
St Edmunds Chapel	II*	Priory Street			17 December 1973	TR3165641661; 51°07′38″N 1°18′34″E		1070322	Upload Photo	Q1379318
Officers Barracks and Attached Basement Area Walls and Rails	II	Queen Elizabeth Road, Dover Castle			8 July 1998	TR3271141719; 51°07′39″N 1°19′28″E		1375601	Upload Photo	Q26656372
1-7, Russell Street	II	1-7, Russell Street			17 December 1973	TR3210641525; 51°07′33″N 1°18′56″E		1145888	Upload Photo	Q26439043
1-12, Saxon Street	II	1-12, Saxon Street			14 November 1988	TR3163141574; 51°07′36″N 1°18′32″E		1258927	Upload Photo	Q26550106
143, Snargate Street	II	143, Snargate Street			14 November 1988	TR3178241060; 51°07′19″N 1°18′39″E		1363214	Upload Photo	Q26645051
144, Snargate Street	II	144, Snargate Street			14 November 1988	TR3178441062; 51°07′19″N 1°18′39″E		1258947	Upload Photo	Q26550125
Church of St Peter and St Paul	II*	St Alphege Road, Charlton			27 October 1976	TR3140142310; 51°08′00″N 1°18′22″E		1273145	Upload Photo	Q17557838
5, St James's Street	II	5, St James's Street			25 September 1973	TR3220941530; 51°07′33″N 1°19′02″E		1363191	Upload Photo	Q26645029
9, St James's Street	II	9, St James's Street			25 September 1973	TR3220341514; 51°07′33″N 1°19′01″E		1070323	Upload Photo	Q26324098
The Churchyard	II	St Mary's Church, Cannon Street, CT16 1BU			5 February 2016	TR3189241537; 51°07′34″N 1°18′46″E		1432571	Upload Photo	Q26677831
K6 Kiosk	II	Victoria Park			10 March 2008	TR3238741627; 51°07′36″N 1°19′11″E		1392468	Upload Photo	Q26671685
The Gate House	II	Victoria Park			10 March 2008	TR3238541633; 51°07′37″N 1°19′11″E		1392467	Upload Photo	Q26671684
1-26, Victoria Park	II	1-26, Victoria Park			25 September 1973	TR3231041719; 51°07′39″N 1°19′07″E		1070324	Upload Photo	Q26324100
1-30, Waterloo Crescent	II	1-30, Waterloo Crescent			30 June 1949	TR3207341174; 51°07′22″N 1°18′54″E		1145901	Upload Photo	Q26439057
Former Dover Harbour Station	II	Western Docks			22 April 1994	TR3164340522; 51°07′02″N 1°18′30″E		1273166	Upload Photo	Q26562941
White Horse Inn	II	Woolcomber Street			17 December 1973	TR3225041565; 51°07′35″N 1°19′04″E		1299029	Upload Photo	Q26586460
60th Rifles Memorial to Indian Mutiny	II				29 May 2014	TR3205641184; 51°07′22″N 1°18′53″E		1420014	Upload Photo	Q26676768
Clock Tower and Former Lifeboat House	II				16 December 2009	TR3194440738; 51°07′08″N 1°18′46″E		1393606	Upload Photo	Q26672758
Connaught Pumping Station	II				14 January 1991	TR3217542129; 51°07′53″N 1°19′01″E		1070300	Upload Photo	Q26324038
Former Customs Watch House	II				16 December 2009	TR3201440409; 51°06′57″N 1°18′49″E		1393603	Upload Photo	Q26672755
K6 Telephone Kiosk	II				20 February 1989	TR3204641214; 51°07′23″N 1°18′53″E		1273164	Upload Photo	Q26562939

== See also ==
- Grade I listed buildings in Kent
- Grade II* listed buildings in Kent

== Sources ==
- Newman, John (2013) [1969], Kent: North-East and East, The Buildings of England, New Haven and London: Yale University Press, ISBN 978-0-300-18506-5
