= Sieges of Dover Castle (1216–17) =

Sieges of the First Barons' War in England

- Part of the First Barons' War
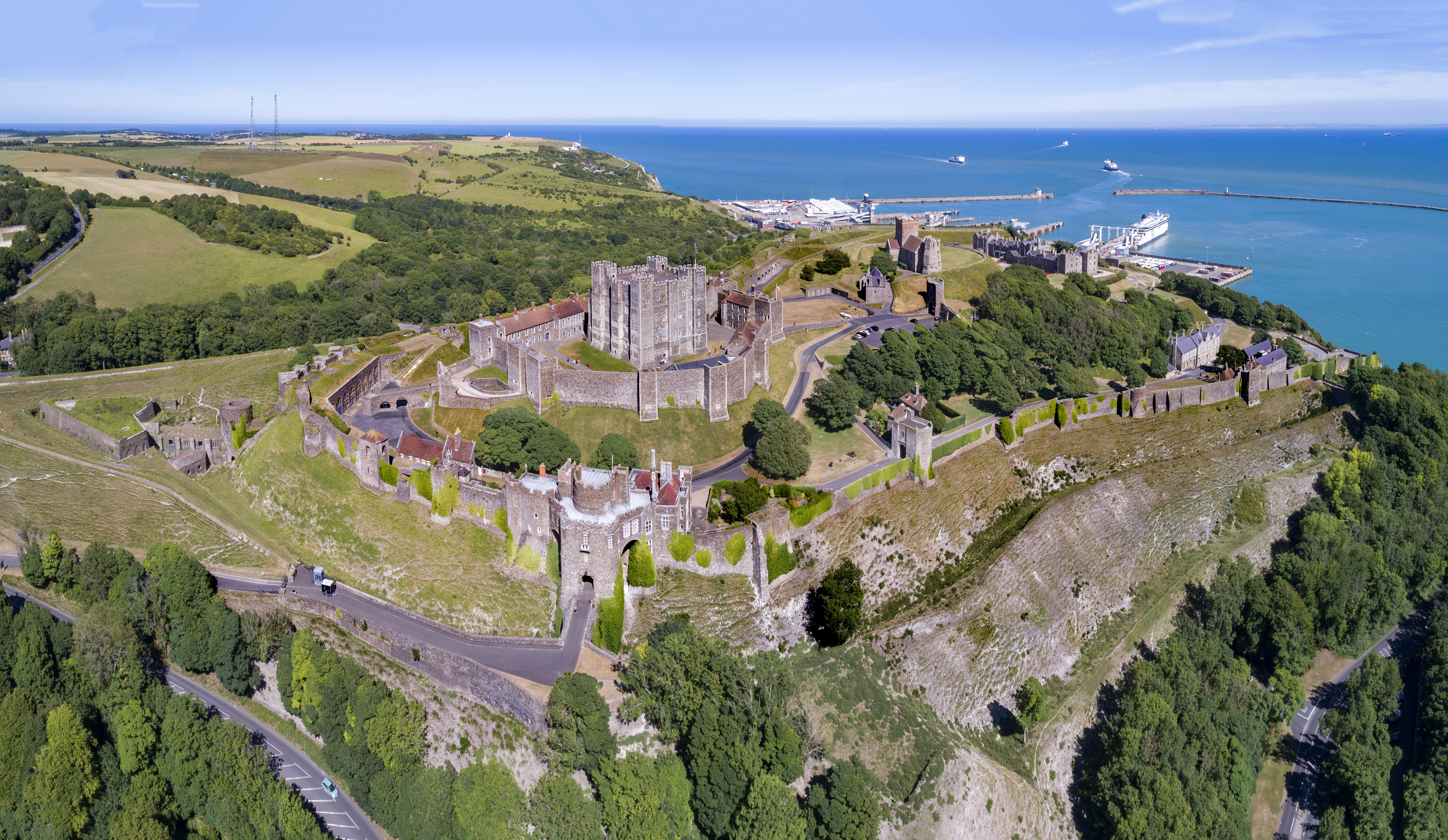
- Dover Castle, pictured in 2017
Location	Dover, England
Result	Angevin victory

Belligerents
Kingdom of England loyal to the Angevins	Kingdom of England loyal to the Capetians
	Kingdom of France

Commanders and leaders
Hubert de Burgh	Prince Louis

Strength
140 knights, and over 140 sergeants	Superior numbers, 1 trebuchet

During the First Barons' War in 1215–17, Dover Castle was twice besieged by Anglo-French forces under Prince Louis of France. It has also been described as a single siege, with a truce separating it into two distinct phases.

In the first phase in 1216, Louis' forces breached the walls, but were repulsed by the defenders. A truce was struck, and Louis withdrew to London. The second phase in 1217 proved brief; news of the Capetian defeat at the Battle of Lincoln prompted Louis to withdraw and begin peace negotiations.

== Background ==
The Angevin and Capetian dynasties had, for decades, been embroiled in a bitter rivalry. The Angevins were French dukes, nominally subjects of the Capetian kings of France, but their control of the kingdom of England had elevated them to peers of the Capetians.

In 1204 the Capetians had firmly claimed the upper hand in their ongoing contest, conquering Normandy and crippling the Angevin presence in France. King John of England had attempted to reconquer his French possessions in 1214, but his allies had suffered a devastating defeat at the Battle of Bouvines, and he had been forced to withdraw.

Noble discontent towards John reached a fever pitch, and in 1215 he had been forced to sign Magna Carta, a document severely curtailing the crown's powers. His subsequent refusal to abide by Magna Carta had resulted in the outbreak of the First Barons' War, a large-scale rebellion against the king. The rebellious barons invited Prince Louis of France to take the throne, and he arrived in England on 21 May 1216; an Angevin force had gathered to oppose him, but withdrew without giving battle.

== First siege ==
Dover Castle occupied a key strategic position on the south coast of England, overlooking the English Channel; as such, it was regarded as the 'Key to England' and a "lynchpin" in the Angevin Empire. As such, it was one of Louis' most important targets. He began the siege in May 1216, first moving to encircle the castle, while his naval forces cut off the defenders' access to the sea. He then began construction of a siege tower, and started undermining the walls. He also deployed artillery including perriers and mangonels. During this initial phase, the defending forces under Hubert de Burgh made several sorties from the castle, disrupting the besiegers.

In August, Louis' knights stormed and captured the timer palissade of the outer barbican, following successful undermining. The besiegers were bolstered by good news, as the Capetians' new ally Alexander II of Scotland arrived to do homage to Louis, and a number of reinforcements arrived from France. In September, the besiegers' undermining created a breach in the walls, which they promptly stormed; however, they were repulsed by the defenders, who then barricaded the breach.

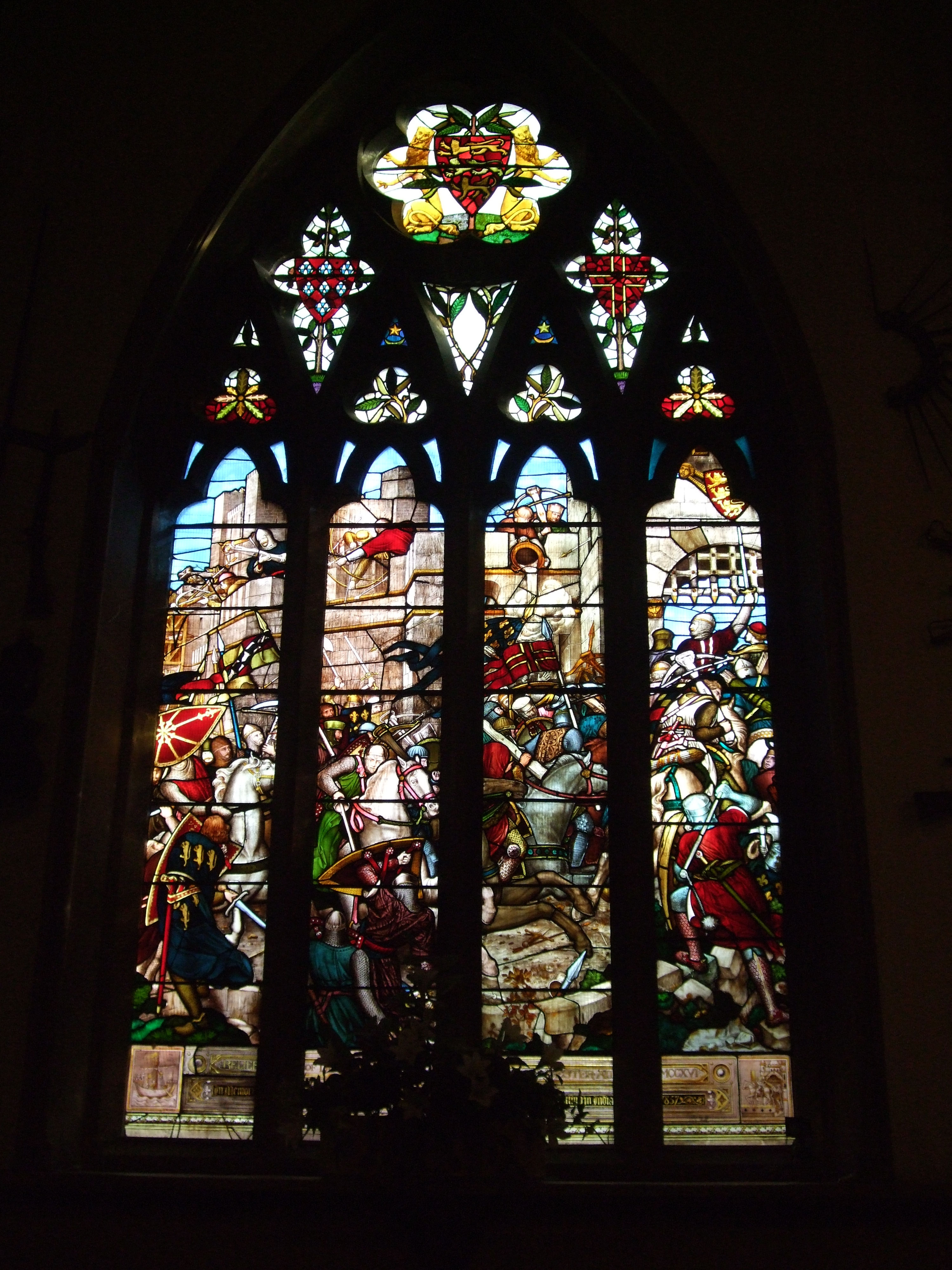
A depiction of the Siege of Dover, depicted on a stained glass window in Maison Dieu, Dover

== Truce ==
With his attempt to storm the breach defeated, Louis agreed a three-month truce with de Burgh on 14 October, and withdrew to London. While there, he received news of the unexpected death of King John. With John dead, leadership of the Angevin faction passed to the nine-year old Henry III; a regency council was soon established under leading magnate William Marshal and Papal Legate Guala Bicchieri. An attempt was made to have the Dover garrison recognise Louis as king, but this was not successful.

Louis split his forces, sending a contingent north under Thomas, Count of Perche to relieve the Angevin siege of Mountsorrel. Meanwhile, he led the rest of his forces to resume the siege of Dover Castle.

== Second siege ==
The truce broke down as be Burgh – who had repaired the damage to the castle's walls – led an unexpected sortie, attacking Capetian reinforcements in the port of Dover.

Louis' army returned, arriving on 12 May, and settled in for another siege. He deployed a trebuchet – the first recorded instance of a trebuchet being used in England. However, his prospects were worsened by the arrival of an Angevin naval force under Phillip d'Albini, which cut off the flow of supplies and reinforcements from France.

On 20 May, Louis' second army under Thomas of Perche suffered a major defeat to the Angevins at the Battle of Lincoln. When news of this reached Louis on 25 May, he realised his situation had become precarious: he'd lost his superiority on land, and the Angevin naval forces were continuing to control the coast off of Dover. He broke the siege and retreated to London.

== Aftermath ==
Louis' attempts to claim the English throne had suffered a major set-back through his failure to siege Dover Castle (the 'key to England'), and through the loss of a number of prominent supports at the Second Battle of Lincoln.

Peace negotiations began shortly after the siege, and initial terms were agreed on 13 June. However, negotiations broke down two days later over the insistence of Guala Bicchieri that Louis' clerical supporters would remain excommunicated. The conflict continued, and in August a Capetian fleet set sail with reinforcements. An Angevin fleet under Hubert de Burgh intercepted them, leading to the Battle of Sandwich on 24 August, in which the Capetians were defeated.

With his reinforcements cut off, Louis was forced to return to the negotiating table on 28 August. A peace deal was agreed, with Louis formally renouncing his claim to the English throne, and in September he returned to France.

== See also ==
- The Battle of Lincoln – the battle which led to Louis lifting the siege
- The Battle of Sandwich – the battle which forced Louis' withdrawal from England
