= St Mary sub Castro, Dover =

Church in Dover, England

Coordinates: 51°07′42″N 1°19′24″E

St Mary sub Castro
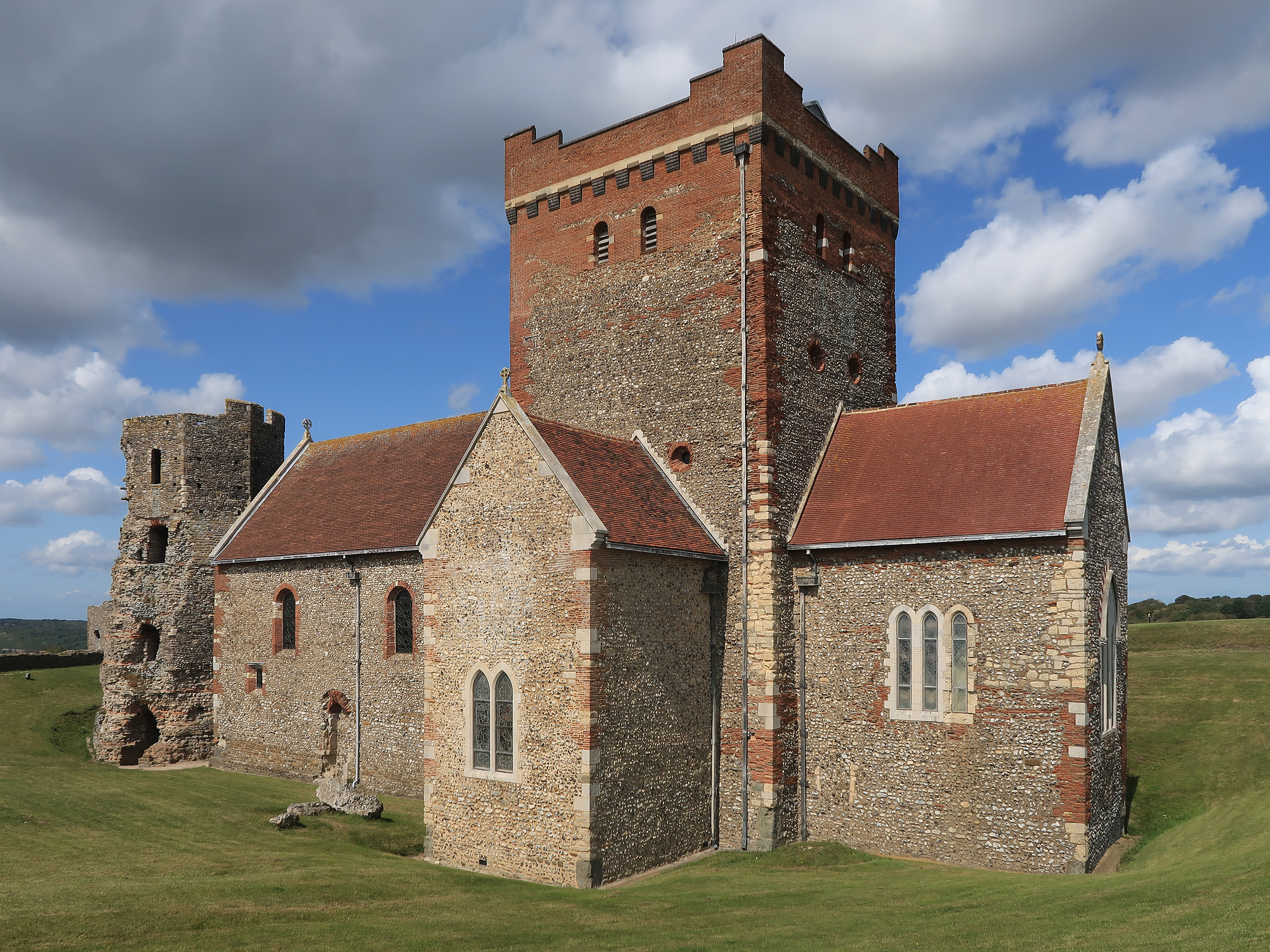
- St Mary sub Castro

Religion
- Affiliation: Christian
- Rite: Church of England
- Ecclesiastical or organizational status: In use
- Year consecrated: ?c.600; c.1000

Location
- Location: Dover Castle, Dover, Kent
- Interactive map of St Mary sub Castro

Architecture
- Architects: Original architect(s) unknown; George Gilbert Scott & William Butterfield (Victorian rebuilds)
- Style: Anglo-Saxon, tower completion is an addition by Butterfield
- Completed: ?c.600; c.1000
- Materials: Stone, flint, tile (much from neighbouring Roman lighthouse)

St Mary sub Castro (i. e. "St Mary below the Castle"), or St Mary de Castro, or St Mary in Castro ("St Mary in the Castle"), is a church in the grounds of Dover Castle, Kent, south-east England. It is a heavily restored Anglo-Saxon structure, built next to a Roman lighthouse which became the church bell-tower. St Mary serves the local population and the army and is the church of the Dover Garrison.

== Location ==
Dover is a major port on the south-east coast of England, at a gap in the White Cliffs of Dover near the narrowest point of the English Channel. Its proximity to mainland Europe has made it a key military, maritime and trade location for millennia. The Romans built forts here in c. AD130 and c. AD270, and the town has fortifications from many eras since. The Romans also built two pharoses, possibly c. AD130, on the Eastern and Western Heights above the gap in the cliffs. St Mary sub Castro is on the Eastern Heights.

It is outside and in a lower position than the Main Tower of the castle, but is on the castle hill and inside the outer enclosure of the castle. This may explain the variance of prepositions used in the name.

== Anglo-Saxon period ==
=== 600 ===
There are records of a church being built 'within the castle' (Latin 'in castra') by Eadbald of Kent in the 630s. However, it is unclear whether this means within the Saxon burgh (usually dated to later than 630) on the Eastern Heights, or within the ruins of old Roman fortifications in the valley. The large, late-Anglo-Saxon cemetery around the present church does suggest the existence of a c.600 church, but not definitively.

=== 1000 ===
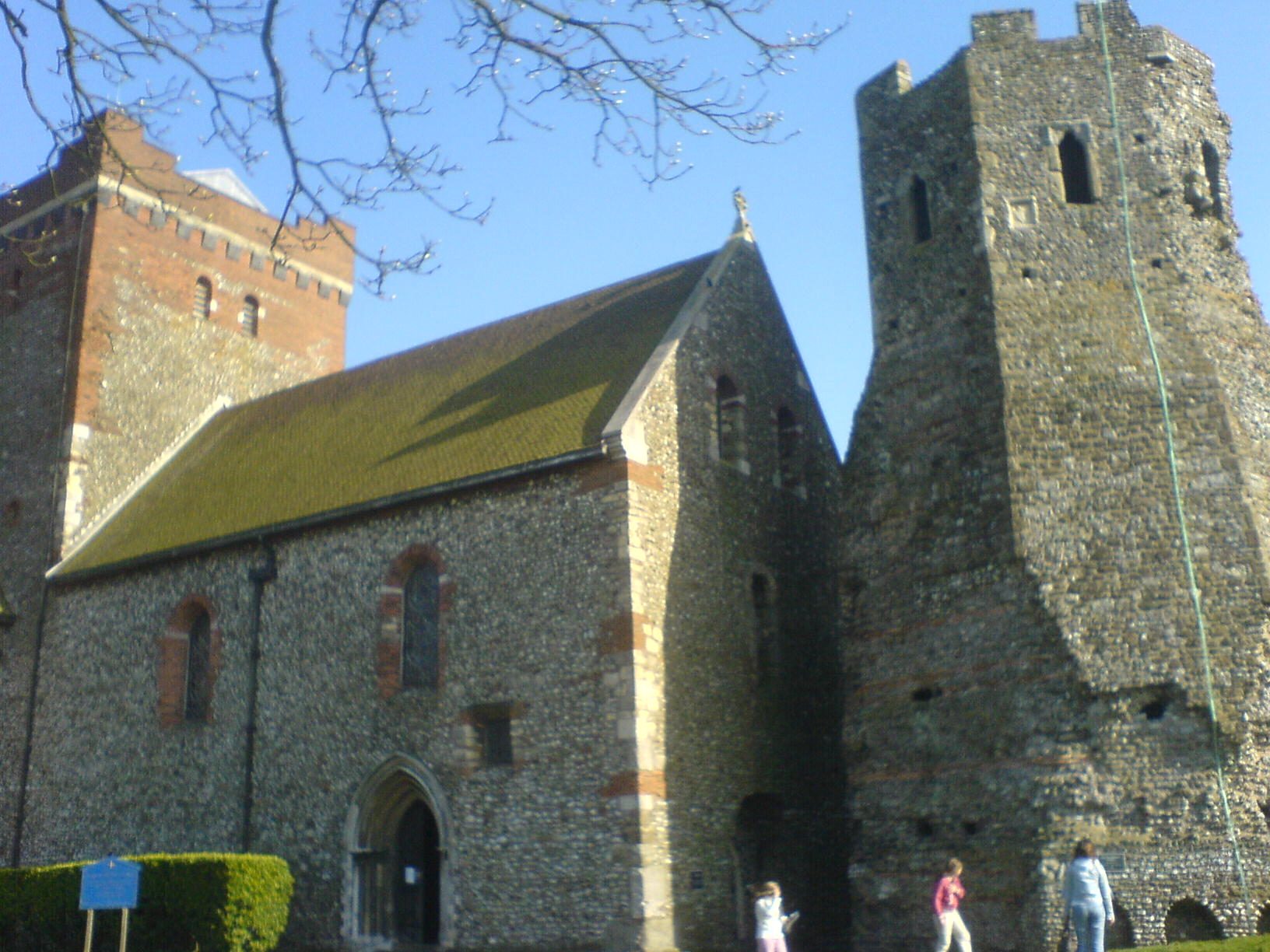
Tiles from the octagonal Roman pharos at right were reused in the Anglo-Saxon church

Whether or not it had a predecessor, the present Anglo-Saxon church was built on the Eastern Heights around AD1000. It is immediately adjacent to the surviving eastern pharos, which was used as a source of spolia: Roman tiles can be still be seen in the church fabric, particularly in the window arches (usually of stone), and flint and tile from the pharos is used throughout the church's walls. The plinth that projects out from beneath the church and on which it stands, however, is of new stone. The church is cruciform with a central tower the same width as the nave but broader than the chancel and transepts. The nave has no aisles. The door arch is the earliest to survive in any standing church in England.

== Medieval rebuilds ==
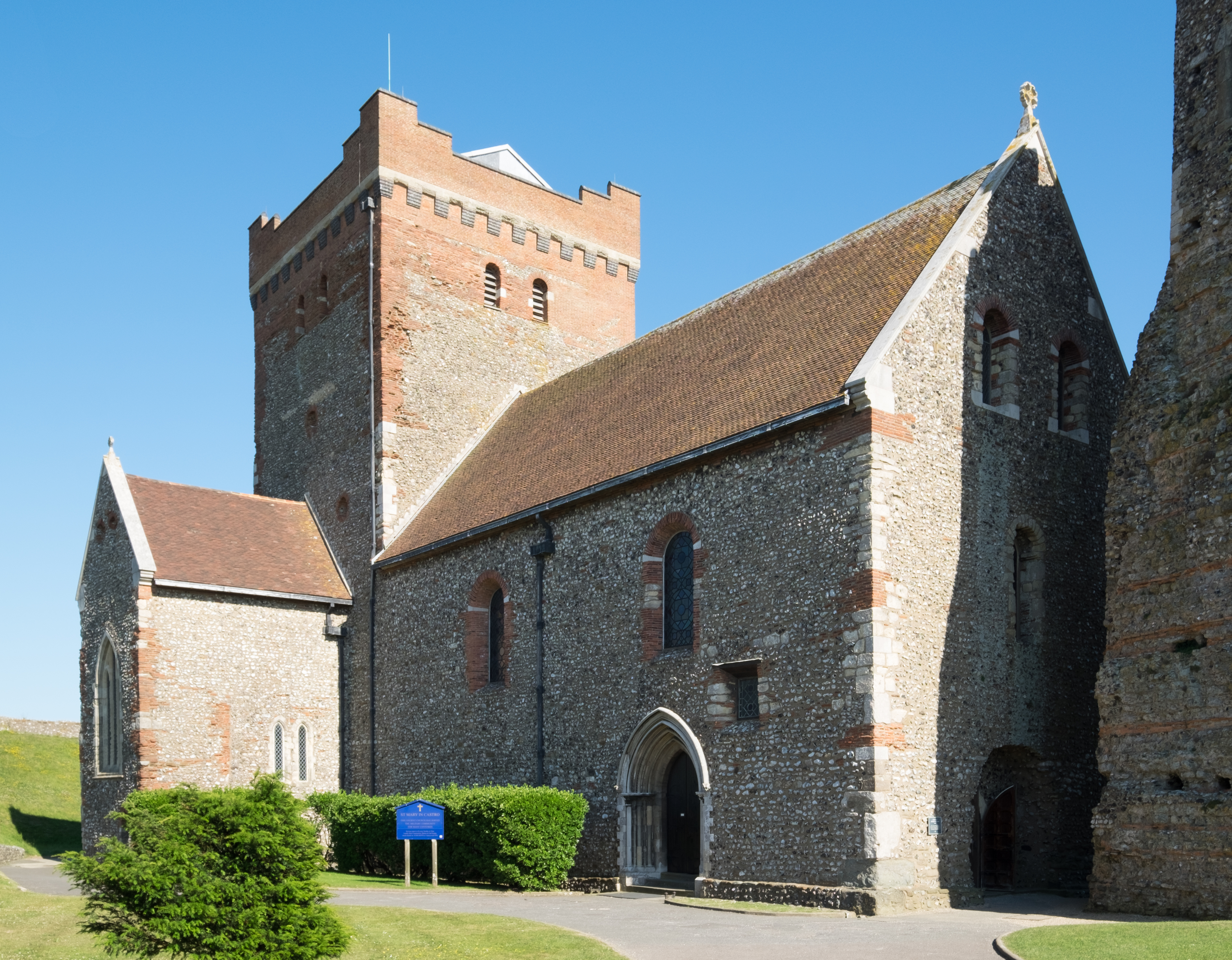
The church from the north-west

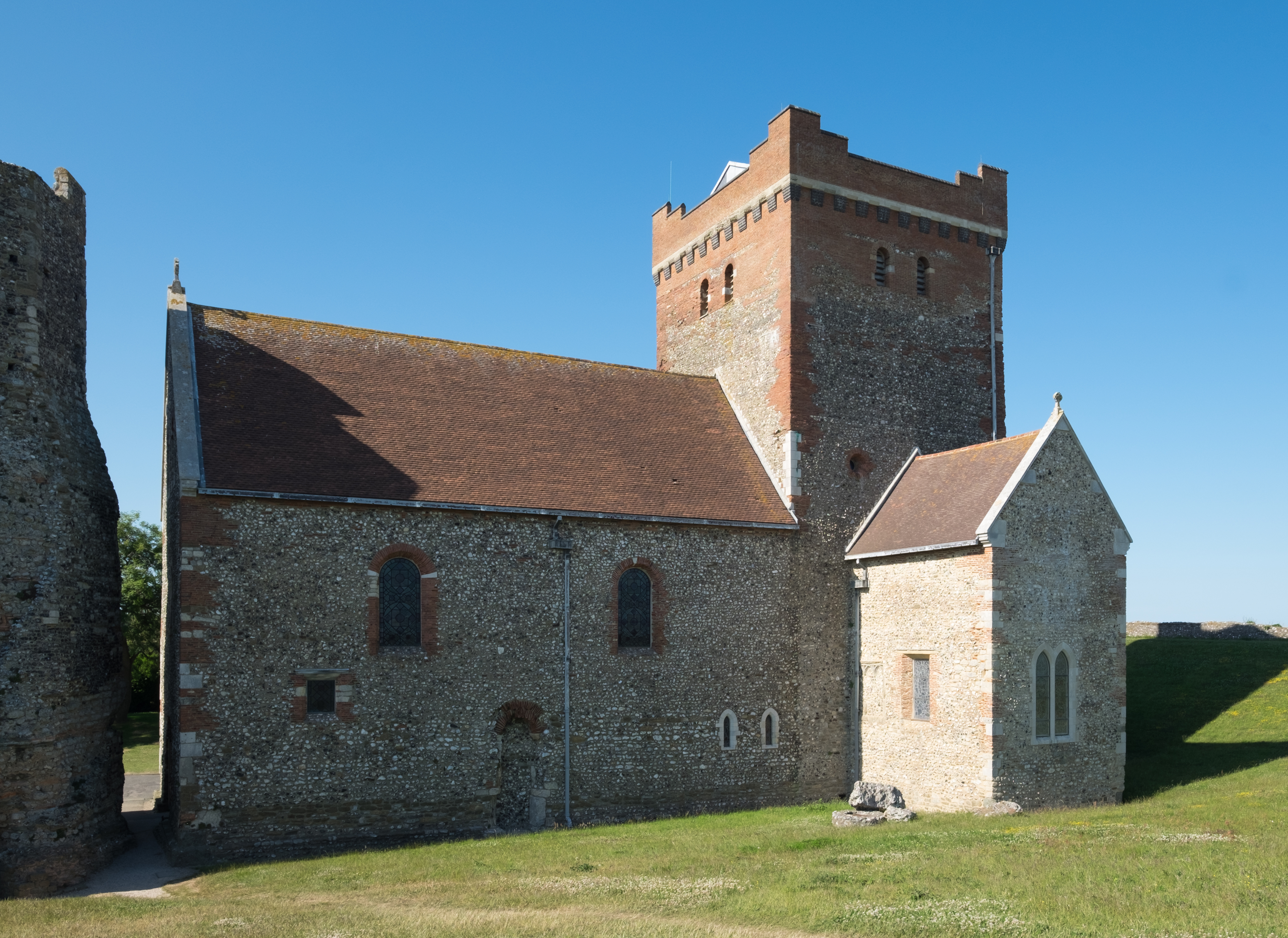
The church from the south-west

The Early English vault and the altar recess in the southeast corner of the nave were probably both added to the existing church at the end of the twelfth century. As part of his building works at the castle, in 1226 Henry III of England instructed that the church be repaired and twenty-one years later ordered the making of three altars and images, for and of St Edmund, St Adrian and St Edward, along with an image of St John the Evangelist.

A new stage was added to the four surviving Roman stages (out of a possible original eight) of the pharos to turn it into a bell tower, along with a short passage to connect it to the church. In 1252, three bells were cast at Canterbury to be hung in the pharos. In 1342–3, three bells were sold out of St Mary sub Castro to another St Mary's church, in the nearby village of Lower Hardres, for at least £4. They were replaced in 1345 by two newly cast bells, weighing 4266 lb and 1078 lb, and costing £15 18s. 5¼d. Between 1426 and 1437, works on the pharos cost £176 11s. 11½d and included five new stone windows in the medieval stage, which may have been rebuilt.

Other works on the church included repainting between 1324 and 1334 by "John of Maidstone", and over £36 spent on church and keep in 1494, although the proportion spent on the church is unknown. The latter work was by Edward Poynings, who may well have been deputising for Prince Henry, then the Castle's Constable.

In 1460, Richard Blake is described as clerk & rector of the church within Dover Castle.

== Neglect and restoration ==
From 1555 to 1557 the church was walled up as it was felt unsafe due to lack of repairs, though nineteen years later recommendations were made to repair the chancel in stone, glaze (or reglaze) the windows and provide seats for men to hear divine service. It took another six years, but in 1582 fourteen small chairs were at last bought. Public worship then continued to 1690, though burials of troops from the garrison in the surrounding churchyard continued for some time after that.

The remaining ruin was turned into a storehouse and cooperage in 1780, but a further collapse in 1801 led to its becoming a coal store by 1808, and thus it remained until 1860. That year began the first of two Victorian restorations. The first lasted until 1862 and was carried out by George Gilbert Scott, and the second restoration in 1888, by William Butterfield. Butterfield's restoration completed the tower and added mosaic work in the nave and a vestry, but was generally held to be less sympathetic than the first by Scott.

== Today ==
Today Saint Mary sub Castro is still a thriving church serving the Army and local people, and is the Dover garrison church.

== Description of the present church ==
The 28-feet-high arches at the east and west ends of the crossing appear to be original, and their west faces are outlined by strip work of projecting tiles. A tall round-headed, stone-faced doorway (now blocked and with not much left of its original stripwork outline, but with its typically Anglo-Saxon alternating horizontal and vertical slabs) gave access to the nave from the south. Unusual double splayed round-headed windows pierce the nave's north and south walls, and Scott (who found them during his restoration) suggested there were another pair near the west end of the nave's side walls. He saw this pair of windows, and putlog holes in the walls for supporting timbers, as evidence for a west gallery, for which space needed to be left between that pair of windows and the west wall.

The church is a Grade I listed building.
