= Dover Castle =

Medieval castle in Dover, Kent, England

- Dover, Kent, England
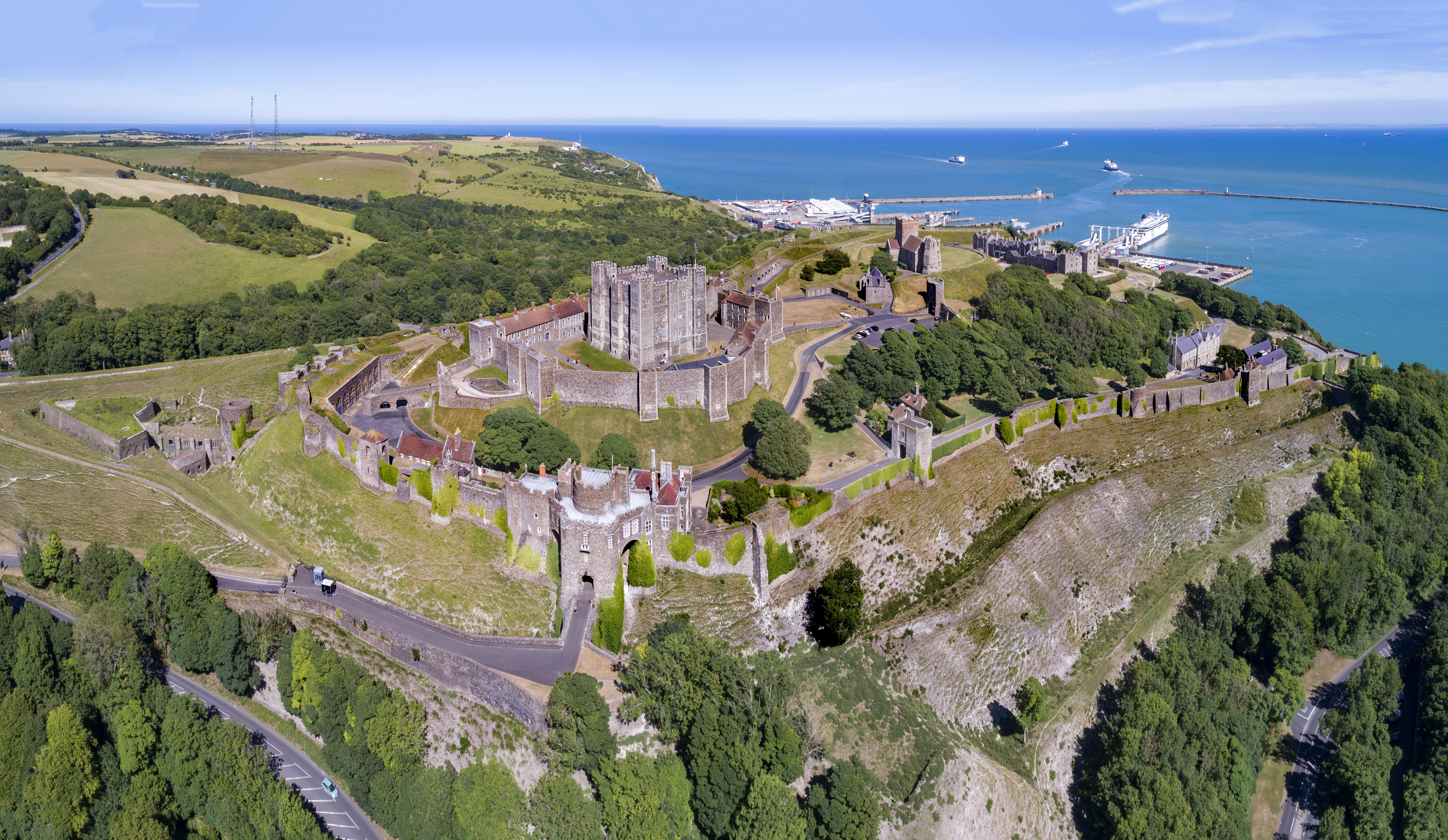
- Aerial panorama of the castle

Site information
- Type: Norman castle
- Owner: English Heritage
- Condition: Intact

Location
- Location within Kent
- Coordinates: 51.1297°N 1.3214°E

Site history
- Built: 12th century
- Built by: Henry II
- Events: First Barons' War

Dover Castle is a medieval castle in Dover, Kent, England and is Grade I listed. It was founded in the 11th century and has been described as the "Key to England" because of its defensive significance throughout history. Some sources say it is the largest castle in England, a title also claimed by Windsor Castle.

== History ==
=== Iron age ===
This site may have been fortified with earthworks in the Iron Age or earlier, before the Romans invaded in AD 43. This is suggested on the basis of the unusual pattern of the earthworks which does not seem to be a perfect fit for the medieval castle. Excavations have provided evidence of Iron Age occupation within the locality of the castle, but it is not certain whether this is associated with the hillfort.

=== Roman era ===
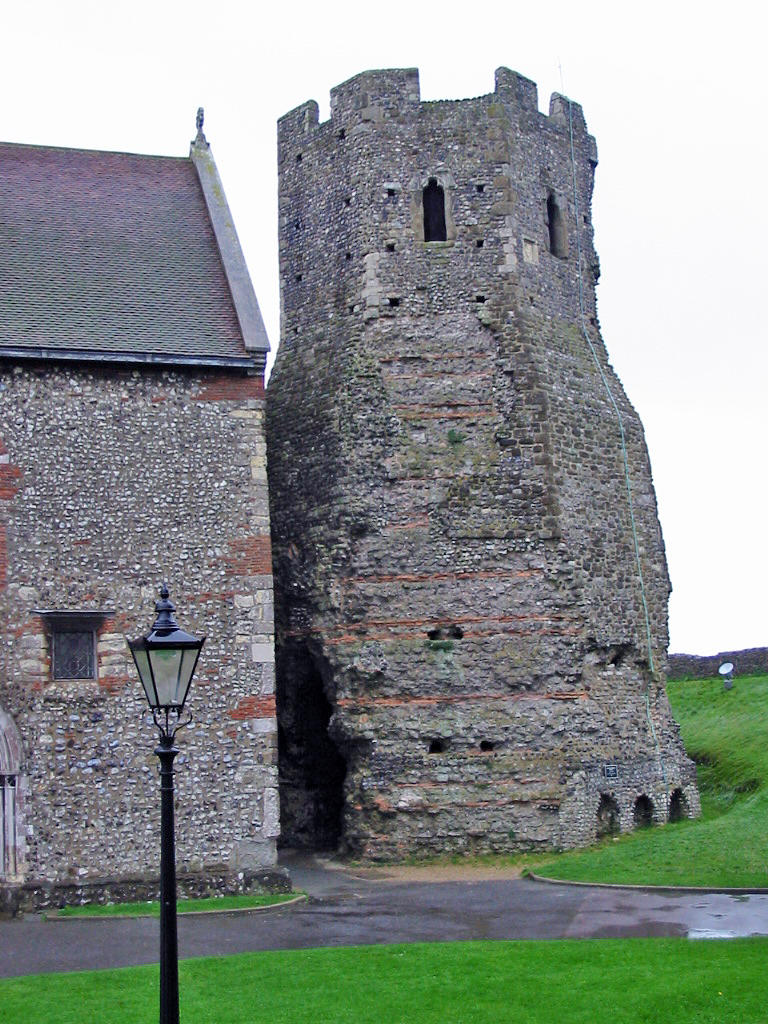
The Roman lighthouse, later converted into a bell tower for the adjacent church

The site also contains one of Dover's two Roman lighthouses, one of only three surviving Roman-era lighthouses in the world, and the tallest and most complete standing Roman structure in England. It is also claimed to be Britain's oldest standing building. Built in the early 2nd century, the 5-level 8-sided tower was made of layers of tufa, Kentish ragstone, and red bricks. The castle lighthouse survived after being converted into a belfry in the Saxon era (c. 1000), having a new upper layer added (c. 1430), and was partially renovated in 1913–1915. The scant remains of the other Roman lighthouse, known as the Bredenstone or the Devil's Drop of Mortar, are located on the opposing Western Heights, across the town of Dover.

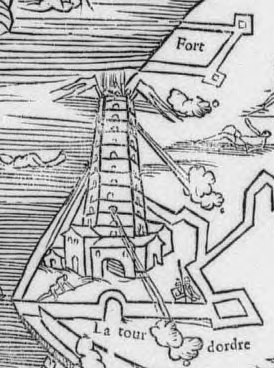
The Tour d'Ordre in 1550

The Roman lighthouse at Boulogne-sur-Mer across the Channel, known as the Tour d'Ordre, survived for many centuries, and its light should have been visible from Dover. It was built circa AD 39 by order of the Emperor Caligula, possibly in preparation for an invasion of Britain. Suetonius refers to Caligula's "erection of a tall lighthouse, not unlike the one at Pharos, in which fires were to be kept going all night as a guide to ships". Coastal erosion led to it toppling into the sea in 1644. Engravings of its height may show how the Dover Roman lighthouse once looked.

=== Saxon and early Norman ===
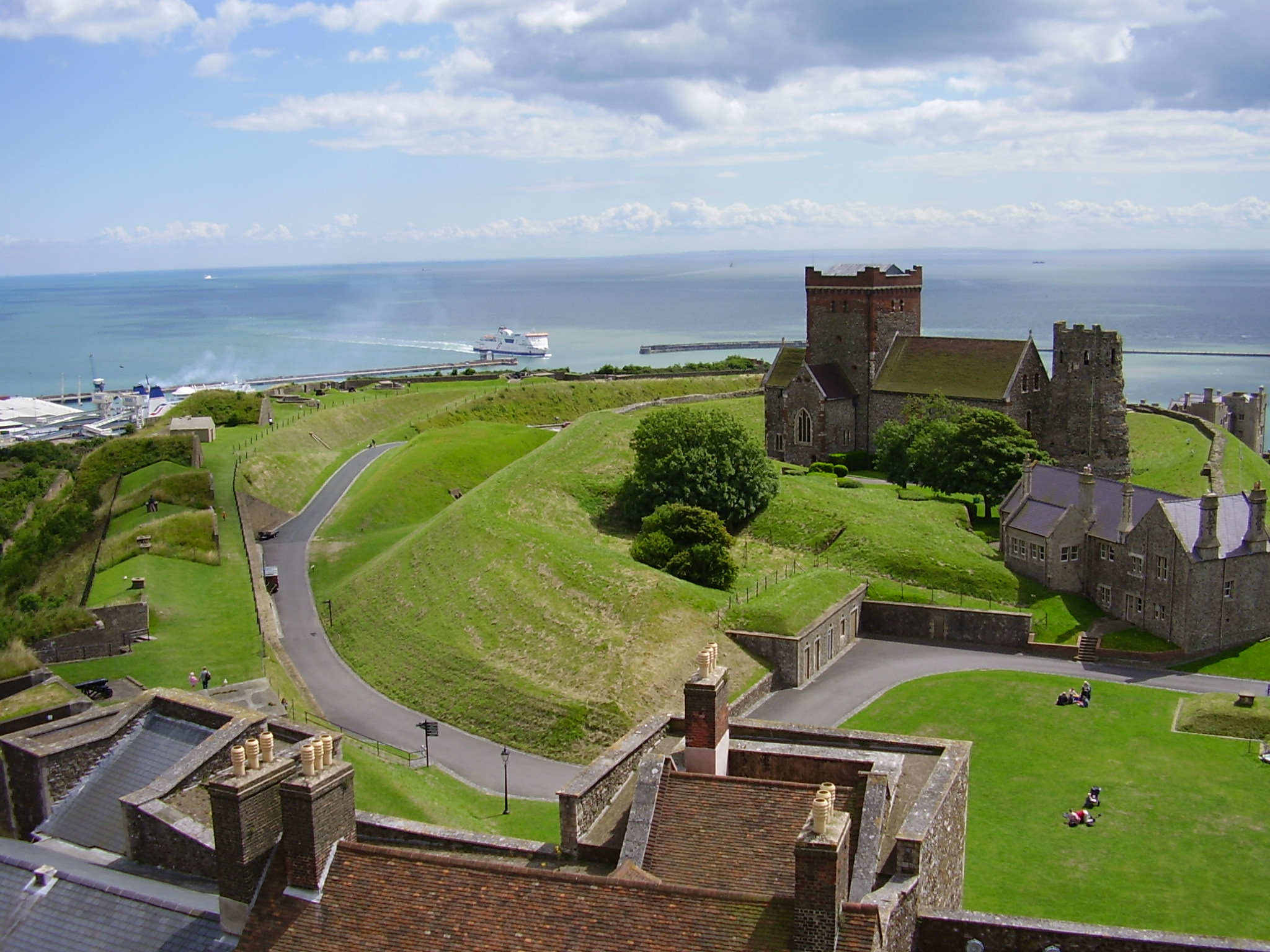
The view down from the (possibly Saxon) burgh, and Harbour beyond.

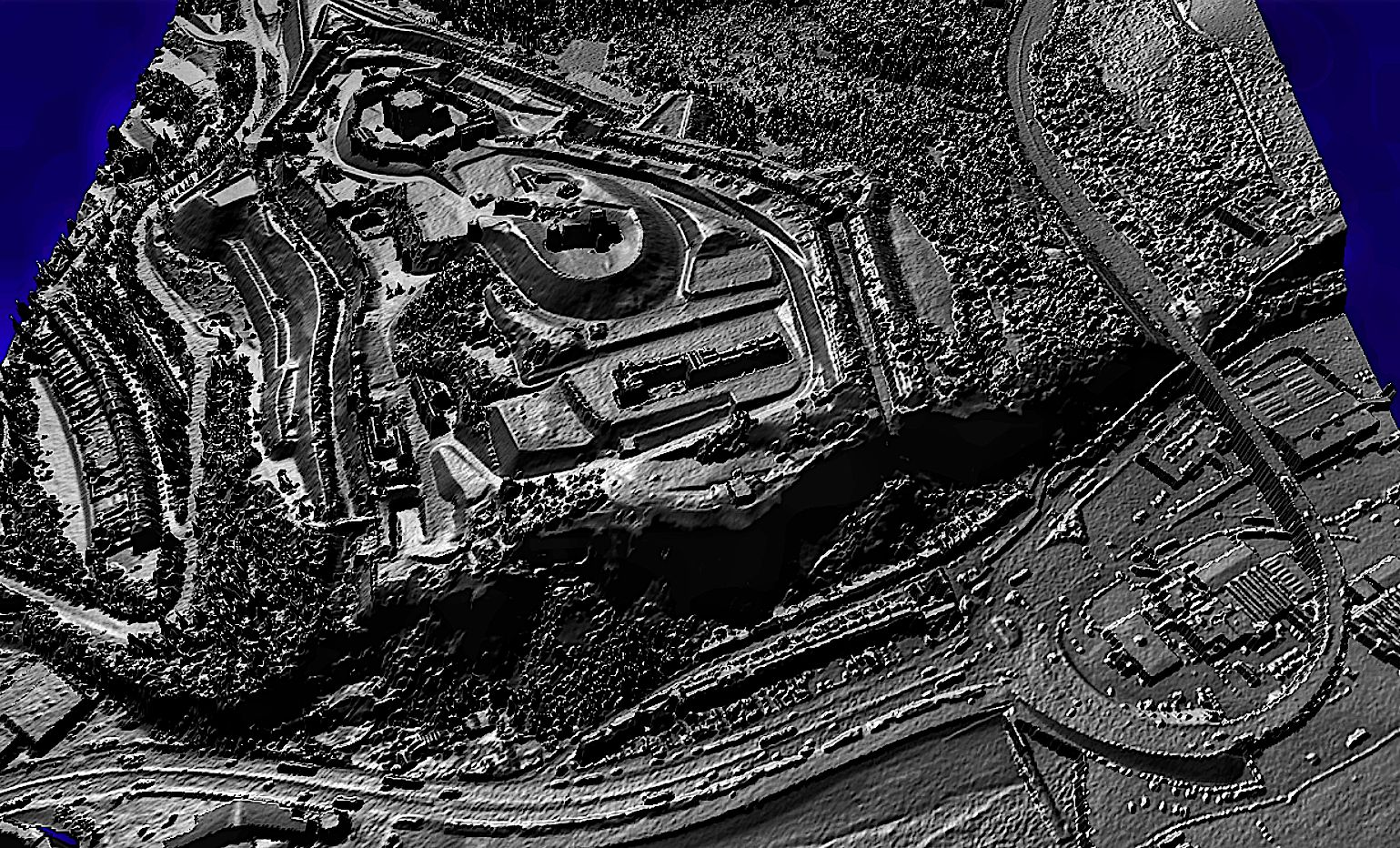
A lidar view of the castle.

After the Battle of Hastings in October 1066, William the Conqueror and his forces marched to Westminster Abbey for his coronation. They took a roundabout route via Romney, Dover and Canterbury. From the Cinque Ports foundation in 1050, Dover has always been a chief member—it may also have been this that first attracted William's attention, and got Kent the motto of Invicta. In the words of William of Poitiers:

Then he marched to Dover, which had been reported impregnable and held by a large force. The English, stricken with fear at his approach had confidence neither in their ramparts nor in the numbers of their troops ... While the inhabitants were preparing to surrender unconditionally, [the Normans], greedy for money, set the castle on fire and the great part of it was soon enveloped in flames...[William then paid for the repair and] having taken possession of the castle, the Duke spent eight days adding new fortifications to it'. The Castle was first built, entirely out of clay. It collapsed to the ground and the clay was then used as the flooring for many of the ground-floor rooms.

In 1088, eight knights were appointed under tenures to guard Dover Castle. Their names were William d'Albrincis, Fulberl (or Fulbert) de Dover, William d'Arsic, Geoffrey Peverell, William Maminot, Robert du Port, Hugh Crevecoeur, and Adam Fitzwilliam.

=== Henry II to early modern times ===
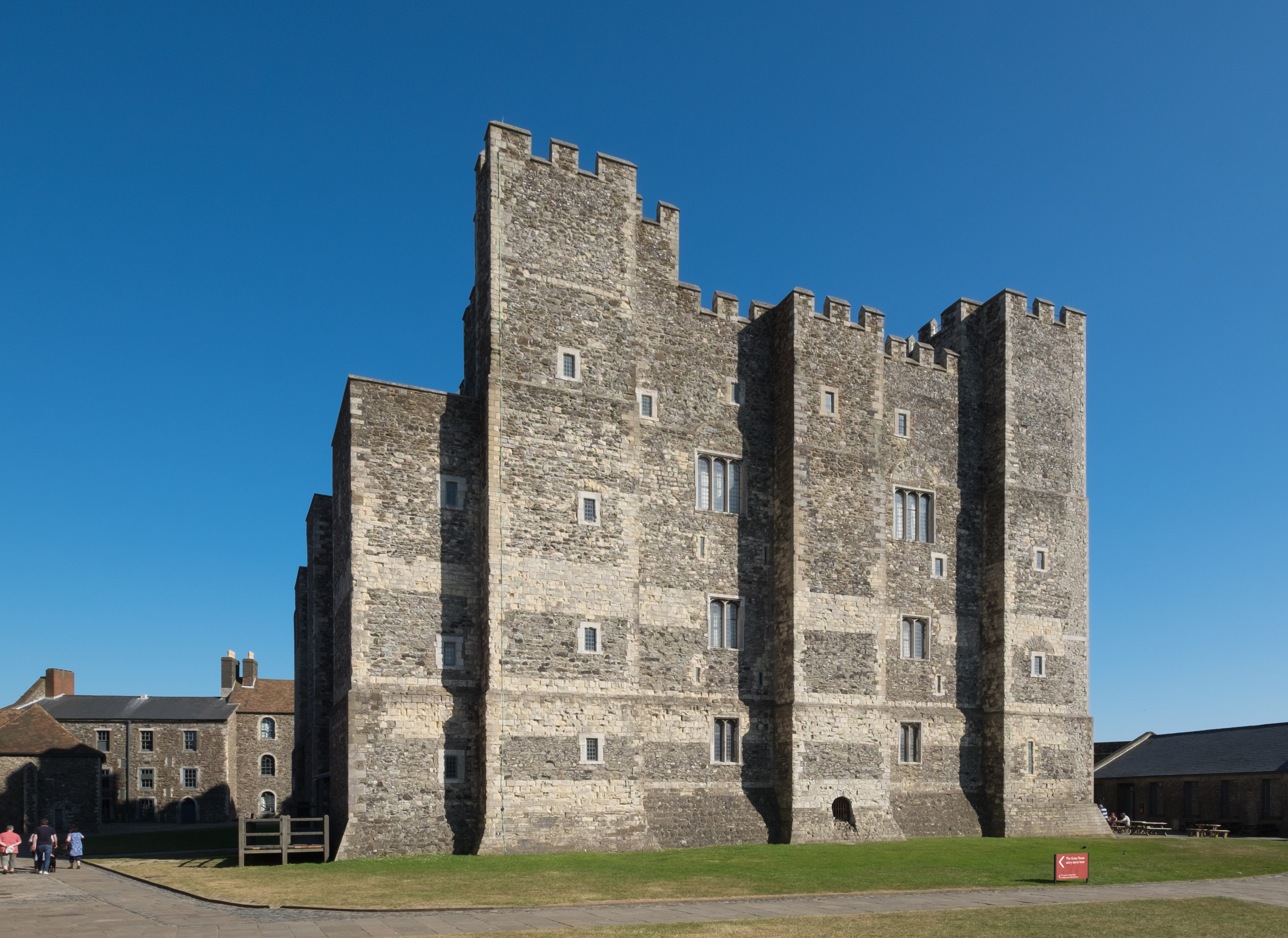
Henry II's Great Tower (the keep)

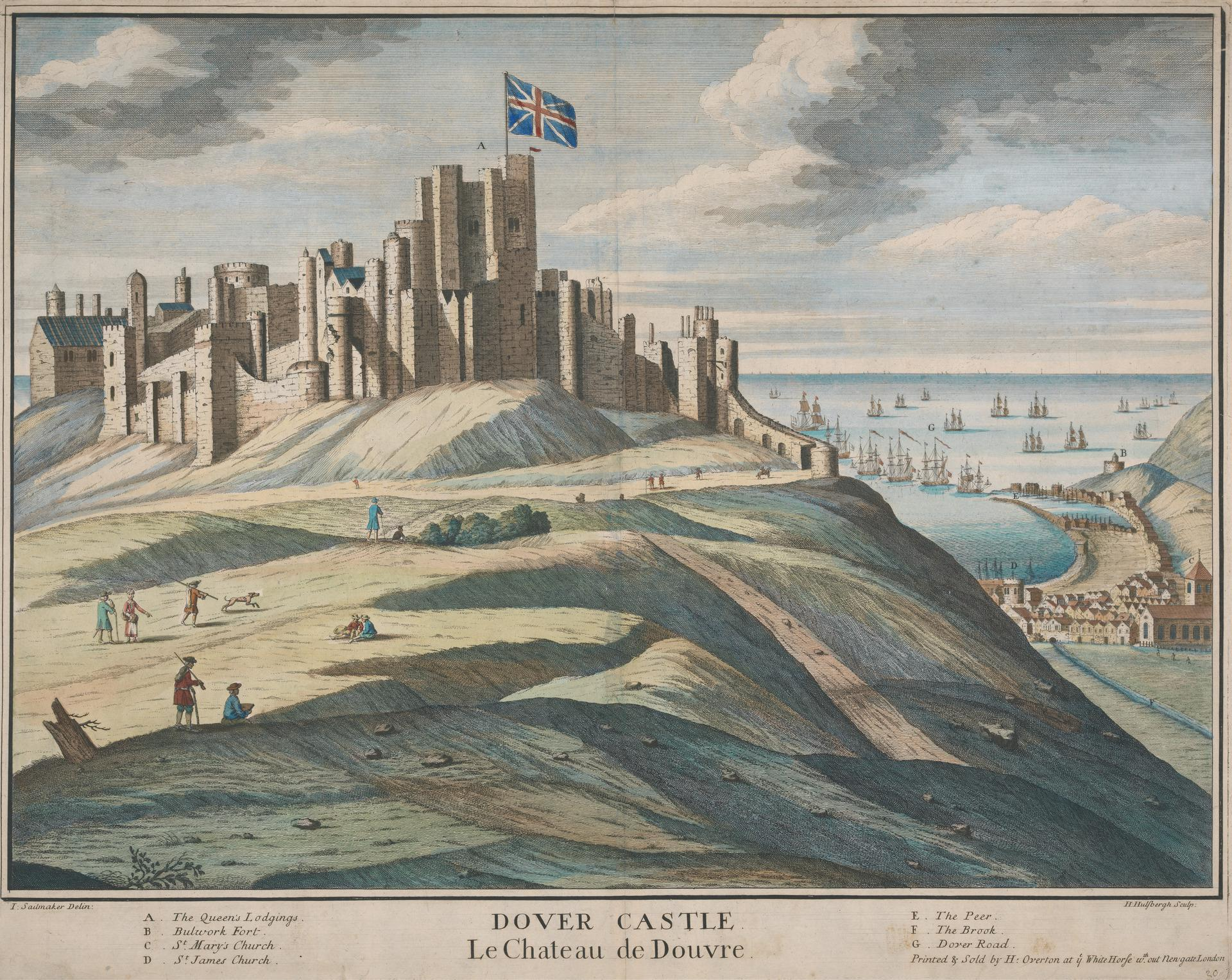
Dover Castle, by Henry Hulsbergh, early 18th century

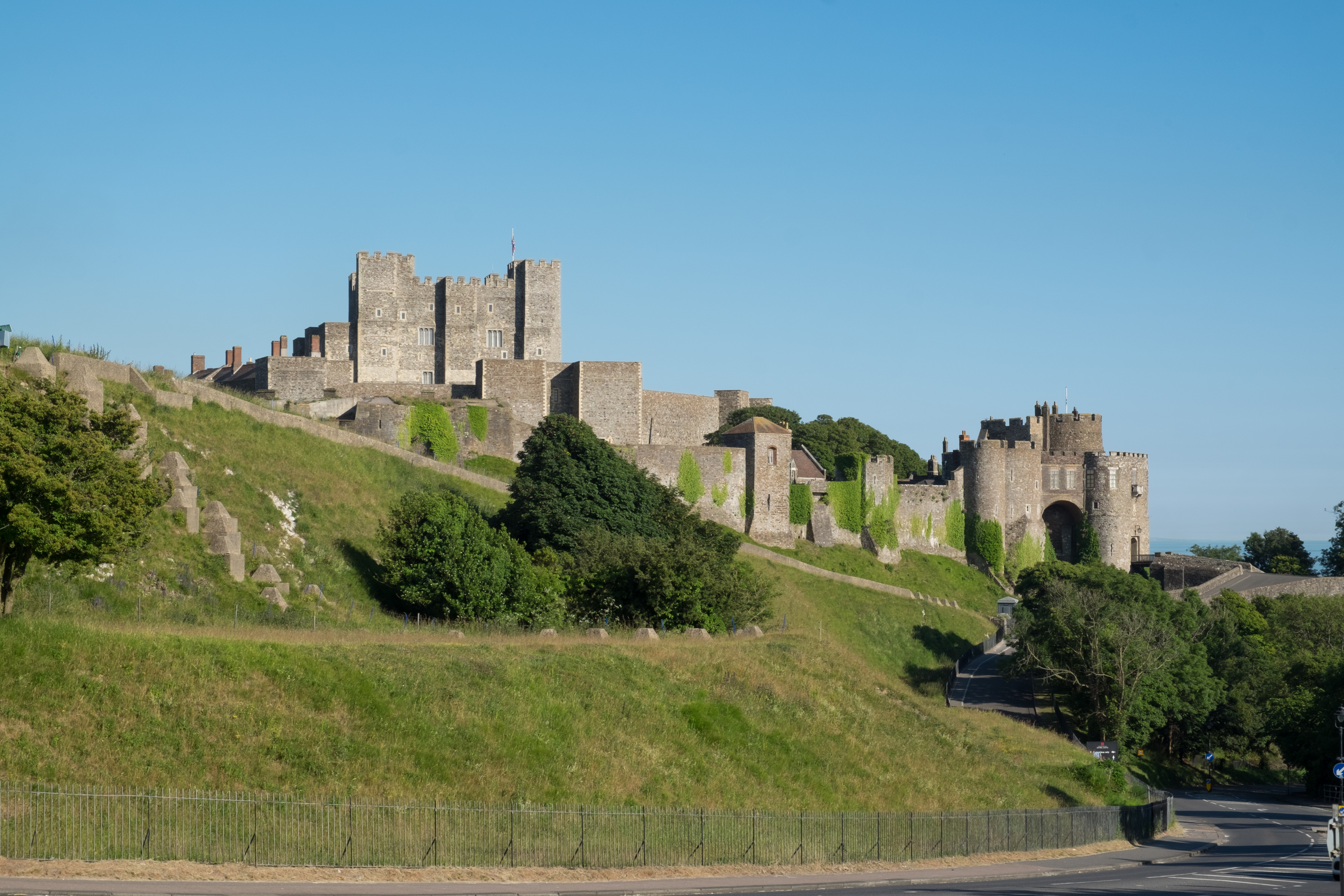
The castle from the north

It was during the reign of Henry II that the castle began to take recognisable shape. The inner and outer baileys and the great keep belong to this time. Maurice the Engineer was responsible for building the keep. From 1179 to 1188, the king spent over £6,500 on the castle, an enormous sum considering that his annual revenue was likely around £10,000.

In 1216, during the First Barons' War, a group of rebel barons invited the future Louis VIII of France to come and take the English crown. He twice besieged Dover, and had some success breaching the walls, but was ultimately unable to take the castle. The vulnerable north gate that had been breached in the siege was converted into an underground forward-defence complex (including St John's Tower), and new gates built into the outer curtain wall on the western (Fitzwilliam's Gate) and eastern (Constable's Gate) sides. During the siege, the English defenders tunnelled outwards and attacked the French.

During the time of Stephen de Pencester, a windmill was erected on Tower 22, which was later known as the Mill Tower. By the Tudor age, the defences themselves had been superseded by gunpowder. They were improved by Henry VIII, who made a personal visit and added to it with the Moat Bulwark. Around 1620, Edward Zouche, Lord Warden of the Cinque Ports for King James I, noted that four towers were in a state of decay, and the covered gallery leading from the kitchen to the royal lodging had been demolished.

During the English Civil War, it was held for the king but then taken by supporters of the Parliamentarians in 1642 without a shot being fired. Knowing the castle was lightly guarded, a local merchant Richard Dawkes accompanied by 10 men scaled the cliffs and attacked the porter's lodge, obtaining the keys and entering the castle before the garrison was summoned.

Dover Castle was a crucial observation point for the cross-channel sightings of the Anglo-French Survey undertaken between 1784 and 1790, which used trigonometric calculations to link the Royal Greenwich Observatory with the Paris Observatory. This work was overseen by General William Roy.

=== 19th century ===
Massive rebuilding took place at the end of the 18th century during the Napoleonic Wars. William Twiss, the Commanding Engineer of the Southern District, as part of his brief to improve the town's defences, completed the remodelling of the outer defences of Dover Castle by adding the huge Horseshoe, Hudson's, East Arrow and East Demi-Bastions to provide extra gun positions on the eastern side, and constructing the Constable's Bastion for additional protection on the west. Twiss further strengthened the Spur at the northern end of the castle, adding a redan, or raised the gun platform. By taking the roof off the keep and replacing it with massive brick vaults, he was able to mount heavy artillery on the top. Twiss also constructed Canon's Gateway to link the defences of the castle with those of the town.

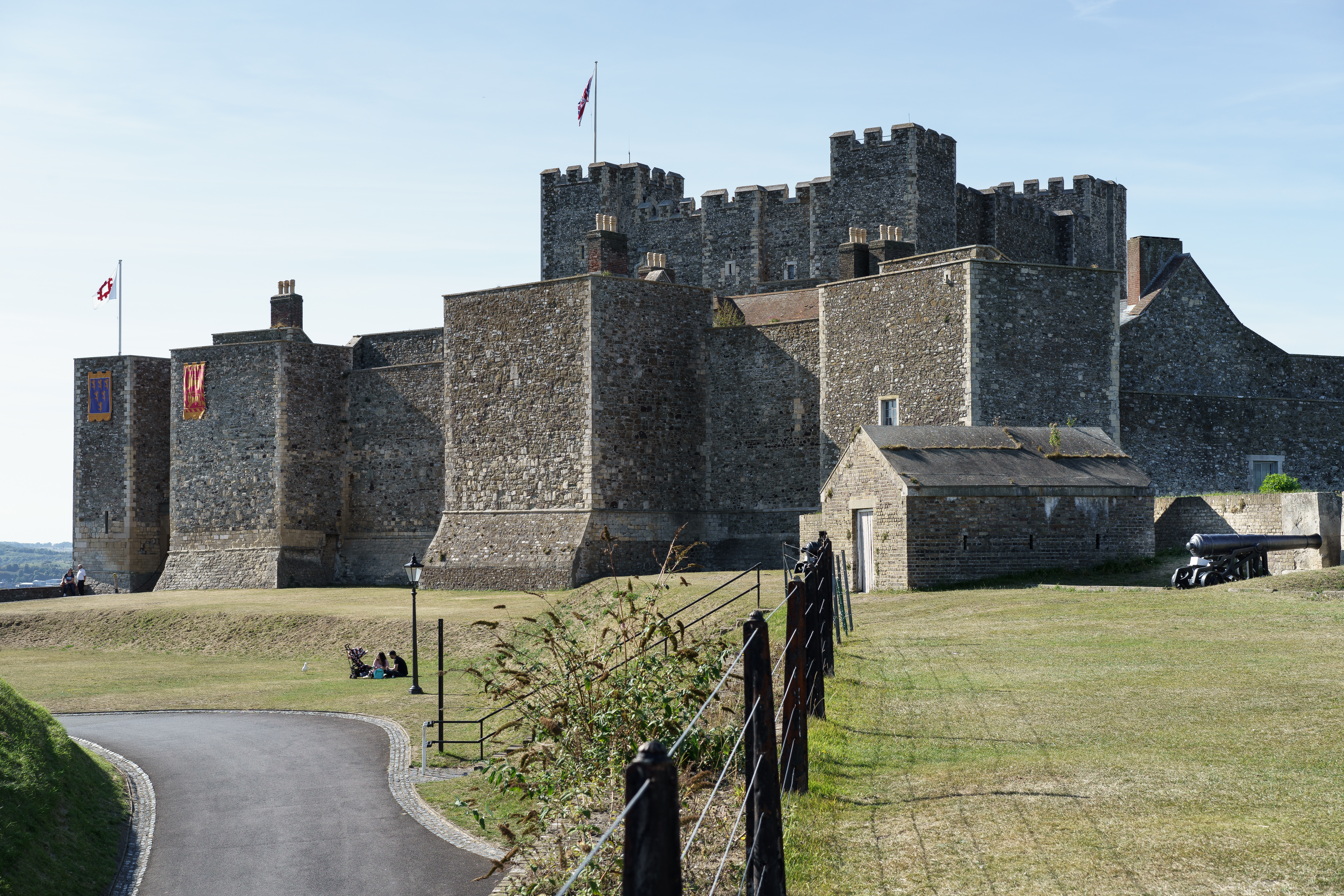
The castle from south-east

With Dover becoming a garrison town, there was a need for barracks and storerooms for the additional troops and their equipment. The solution adopted by Twiss and the Royal Engineers was to create a complex of barracks tunnels about 15 metres below the cliff-top, and the first troops were accommodated in 1803. The windmill on the Mill Tower was demolished during the Anglo-American War on the orders of the Ordnance Board. It was said that the sale of materials from the demolished mill did not cover the cost of the demolition. At the end of the Napoleonic Wars, the tunnels were partly converted and used by the Coast Blockade Service to combat smuggling. This was a short-term endeavour, though, and in 1827 the headquarters were moved closer to shore. The tunnels then remained abandoned for more than a century.

Between 1856 and 1858, Anthony Salvin constructed a new officer's barracks to the south of the castle. Salvin was responsible for the exterior, which he designed in a Tudor Revival style, while the castle's Clerk of the Works, G. Arnold, was responsible for the interior.

=== Second World War ===
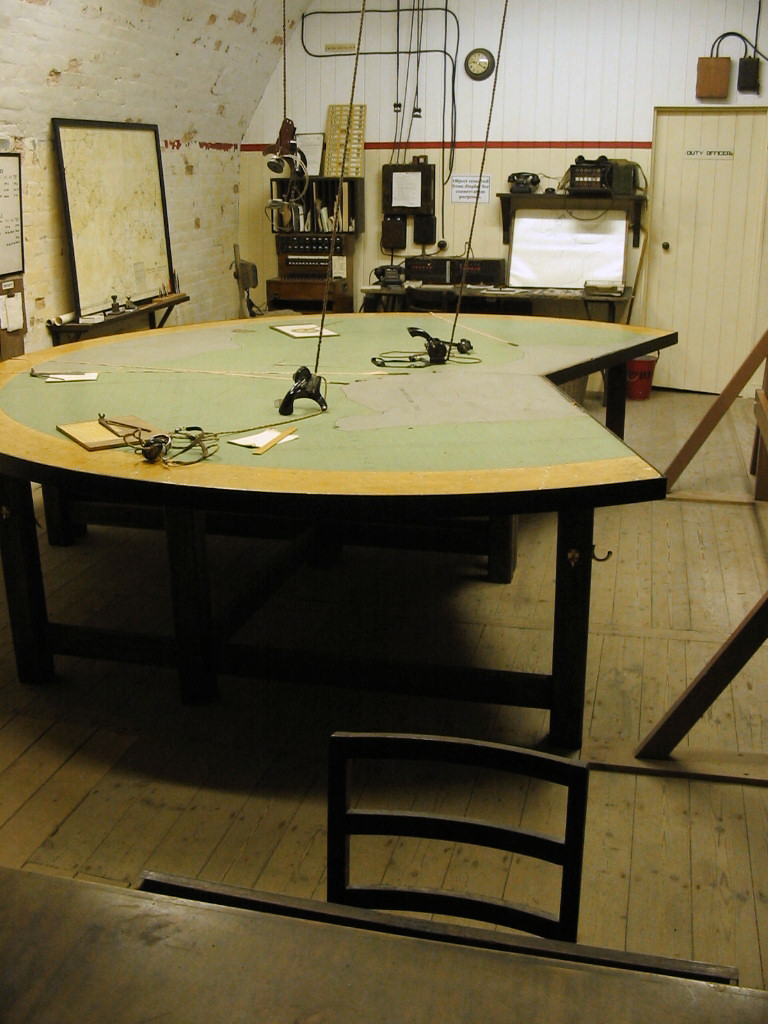
The Second World War Coastal Artillery Operations Room in the Secret Wartime Tunnels

The outbreak of the Second World War in 1939 saw the tunnels converted first into an air-raid shelter and then later into a military command centre and underground hospital. In May 1940, Admiral Sir Bertram Ramsay directed the evacuation of French and British soldiers from Dunkirk, code-named Operation Dynamo, from his headquarters in the cliff tunnels. A military telephone exchange was installed in 1941 and served the underground headquarters. The switchboards were constantly in use and had to have a new tunnel created alongside it to house the batteries and chargers necessary to keep them functioning. A statue of Admiral Ramsay stands outside the tunnels in honour of his work on the Dunkirk evacuation and protecting Dover during the Second World War.

=== Post-war ===
After the war the tunnels were to be used as a shelter for the Regional Seats of Government in the event of a nuclear attack. This plan was abandoned for various reasons, including the realisation that the chalk of the cliffs would not provide significant protection from radiation, and because of the inconvenient form of the tunnels and their generally poor condition. Tunnel levels are denoted as A - Annexe, B - Bastion, C - Casemate, D - Dumpy and E - Esplanade. Annexe and Casemate levels are open to the public, Bastion is 'lost', but investigations continue to locate it and gain access. Dumpy (converted from Second World War use, to serve as a Regional Seat of Government in the event of an atomic war) is closed, together with its esplanade (last used as an air raid shelter in the Second World War).

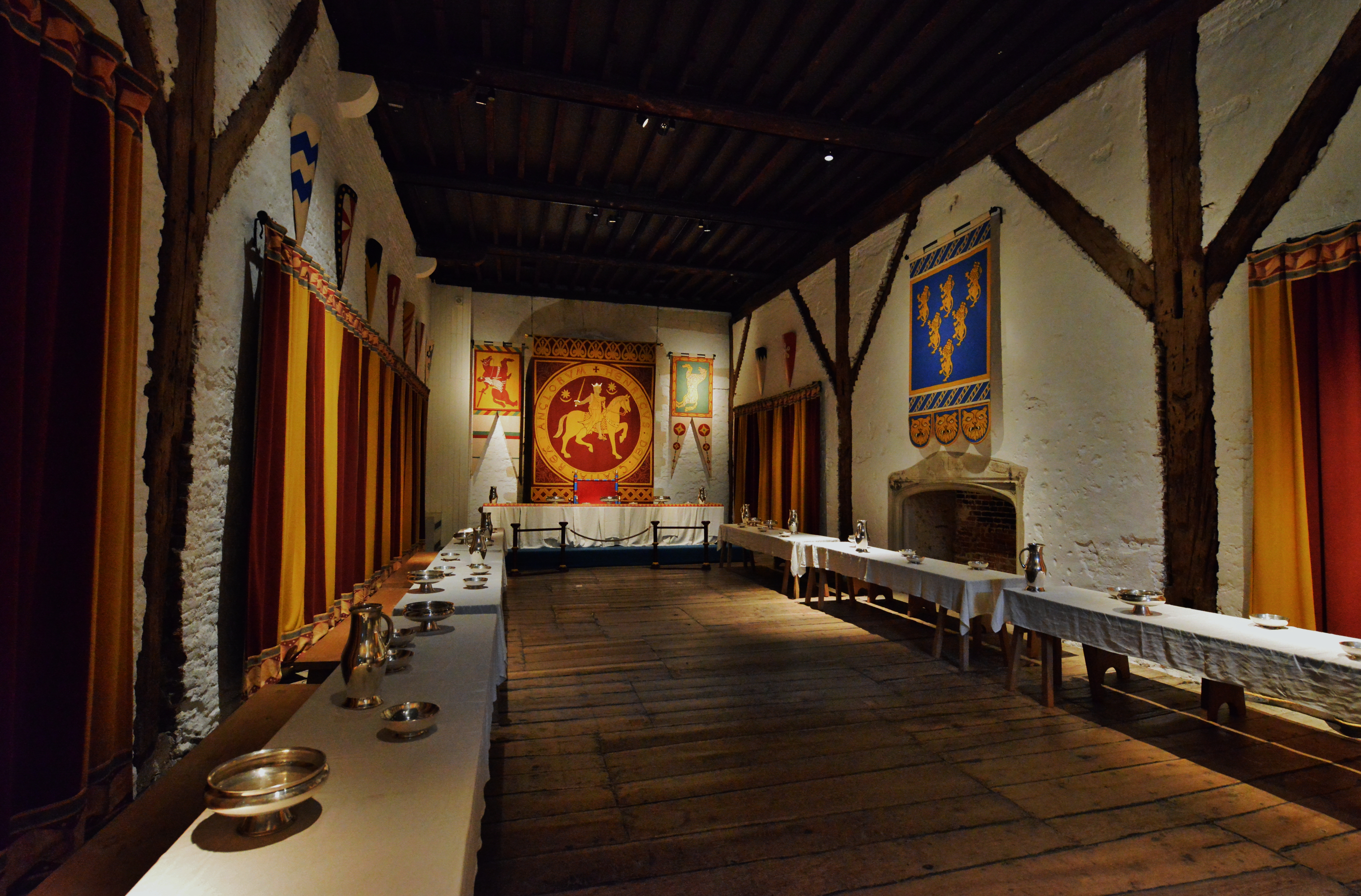
The renovated and redecorated great hall

Between 2007 and 2009, English Heritage spent £2.45 million on recreating the castle's interior. According to figures released by the Association of Leading Visitor Attractions, 368,243 people visited Dover Castle in 2019. The Queen's & Princess of Wales's Royal Regiment Regimental Museum is located in the castle.

Dover Castle remains a Scheduled Monument, which means it is a "nationally important" historic building and archaeological site that has been given protection against unauthorised change. It is also a Grade I listed building, and recognised as an internationally important structure. The Lord Warden of the Cinque Ports is officially head of the castle, in his conjoint position of Constable of Dover Castle, and the Deputy Constable has his residence in Constable's Gate.

In October 2021, the castle was one of 142 sites across England to receive part of a £35 million grant from the government's Culture Recovery Fund.

== Churches and chapels ==
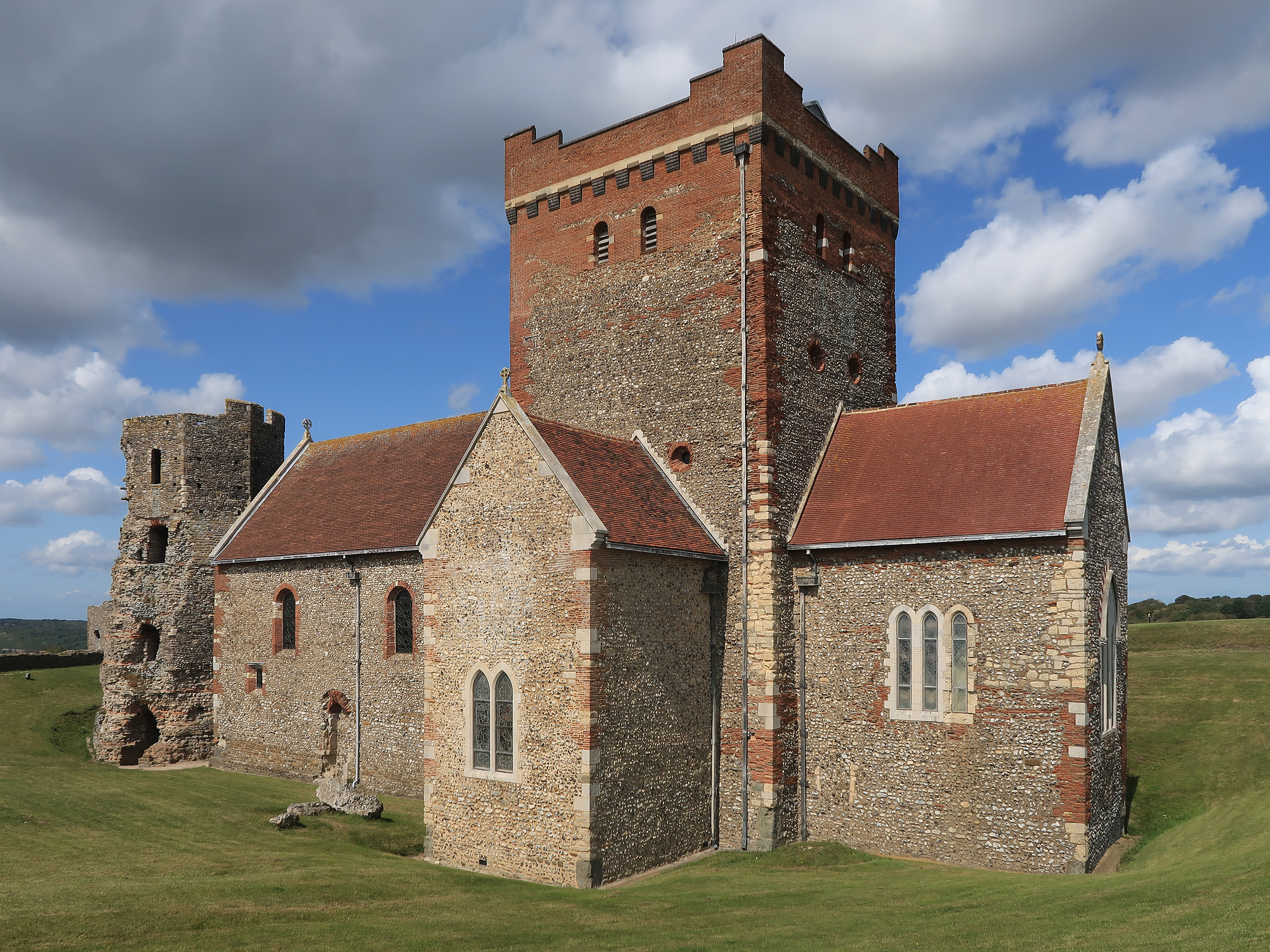
The church of St Mary in Castro, built next to the Roman lighthouse (left)

There are two sacred places within the grounds of the castle:

- Royal chapel - Located within the keep, dedicated to St Thomas Becket.
- St Mary in Castro - A Saxon church, rebuilt in the Victorian era.

== Filming location ==
The castle has been used by productions in TV series such as the Doctor Who serial The Mind of Evil, Wolf Hall, The Hollow Crown, The Amazing Race 31, and Renegade Nell. The medieval setting has also been used in films such as Lady Jane (1986), Hamlet (1990), To Kill a King (2003), The Other Boleyn Girl (2007), Into the Woods (2014), and Avengers: Age of Ultron (2015).

== Gallery ==
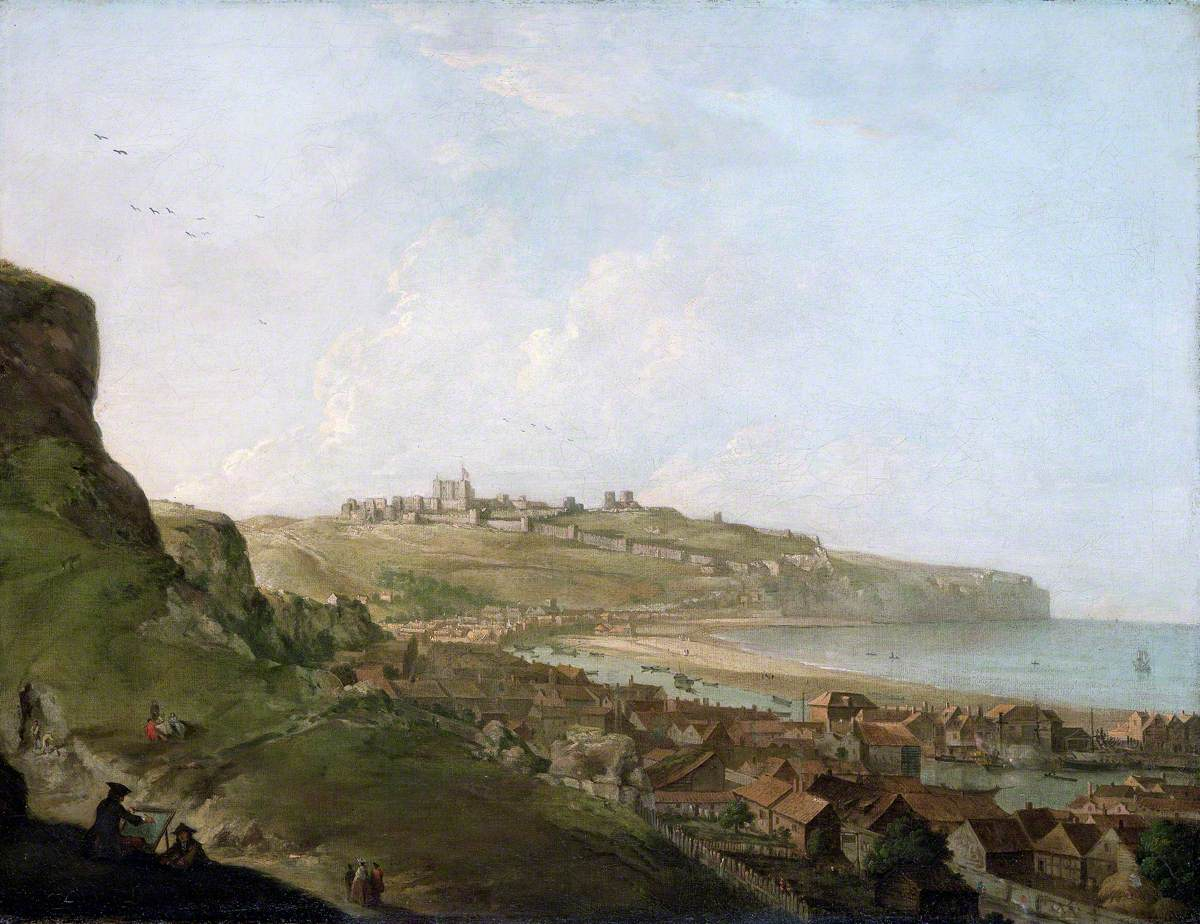
Dover Castle by Richard Wilson, 1747

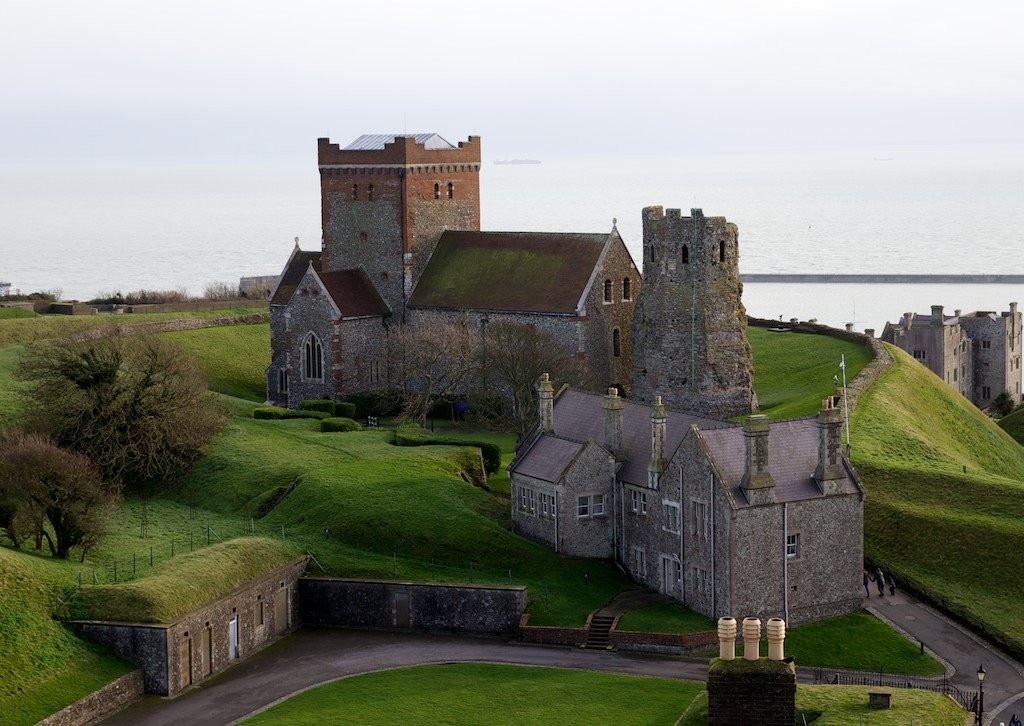
The interior earthen ramparts of Dover Castle

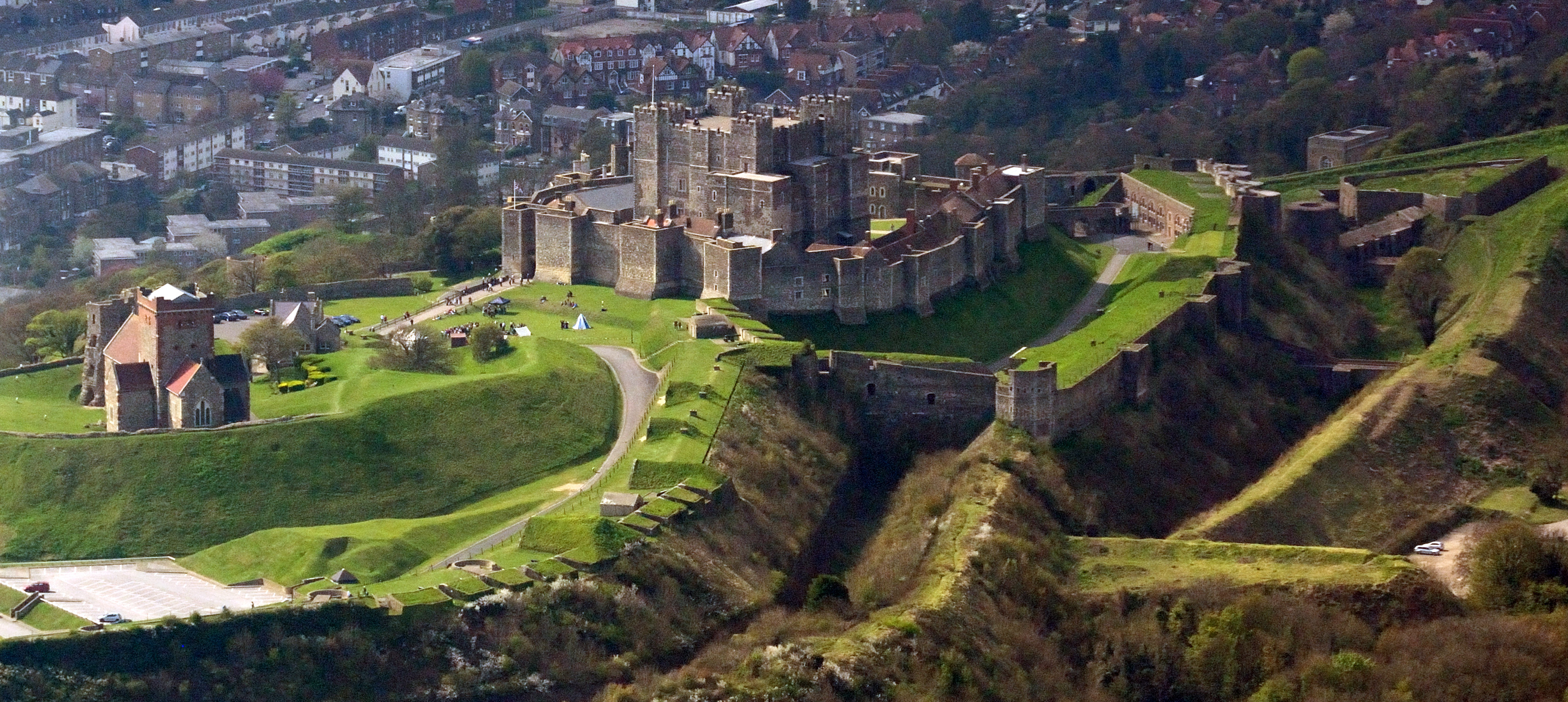
Dover Castle in 2011

== See also ==
- Castles in Great Britain and Ireland
- Dover Castle Clock
- Eastbourne Redoubt
- Governor of Dover Castle
- List of castles in England
- Pevensey Castle
