= Dubris =

Ancient port in Dover, Kent, England

Coordinates: 51.1285°N 1.3230°E

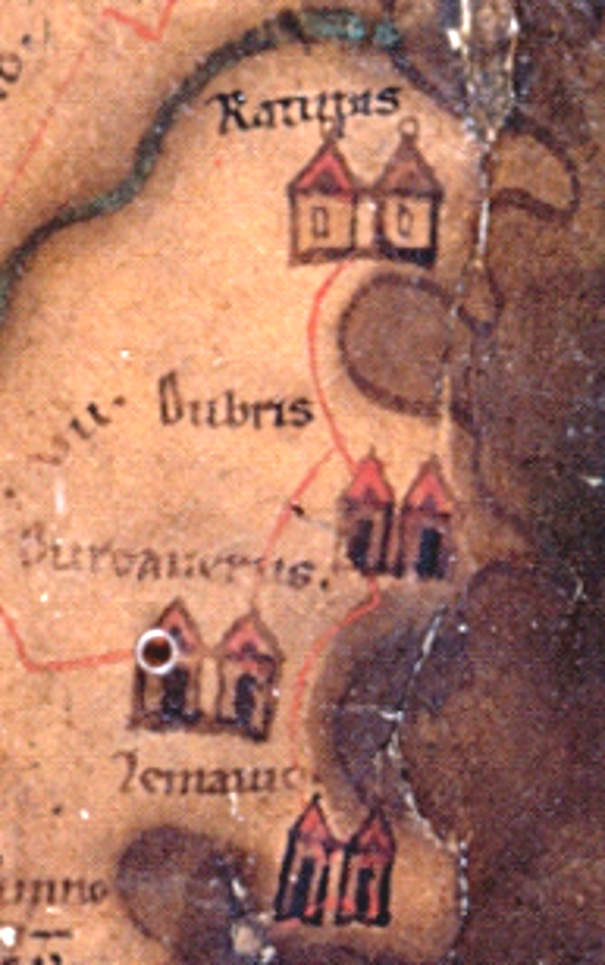
Part of a late copy of the Peutinger Map, showing Roman roads between Richborough, Dover, Canterbury and Lympne

Dubris, also known as Portus Dubris and Dubrae, was a port in Roman Britain on the site of present-day Dover, Kent, England.

As the closest point to continental Europe and the site of the estuary of the Dour, the site chosen for Dover was ideal for a cross-channel port. The Dour is now covered over for much of its course through the town. In the Roman era, it grew into an important military, mercantile and cross-channel harbour and — with Rutupiae (Richborough Roman fort) — one of the two starting points of the road later known as Watling Street. It was fortified and garrisoned initially by the Classis Britannica, and later by troops based in a Saxon Shore Fort.

== Julius Caesar ==
At the start of his first attempt to conquer Britain in 55 BC Julius Caesar initially tried to land at Dubris, whose natural harbour had presumably been identified by Volusenus as a suitable landing place. However, when he came in sight of shore, the massed forces of the Britons gathered on the overlooking hills and White Cliffs of Dover dissuaded him from landing there, since the cliffs were "so close to the shore that javelins could be thrown down from" them onto anyone landing there. After waiting there at anchor "until the ninth hour" (about 3pm) waiting for his supply ships from the second port to come up and meanwhile convening a council of war, he ordered his subordinates to act on their own initiative and then sailed the fleet about seven miles along the coast to an open beach.

== Classis Britannica fort ==
The Roman fleet in British waters, the Roman navy's main purpose was protecting the Gaul-to-Britain routes and supporting the land army in Britannia, not defending Britain from invasion. For this reason, its main harbour was in Gesoriacum (Boulogne), not Dover. However, it did have other, smaller bases in Britannia itself, at Rutupiae and Dubris.

== Lighthouses ==
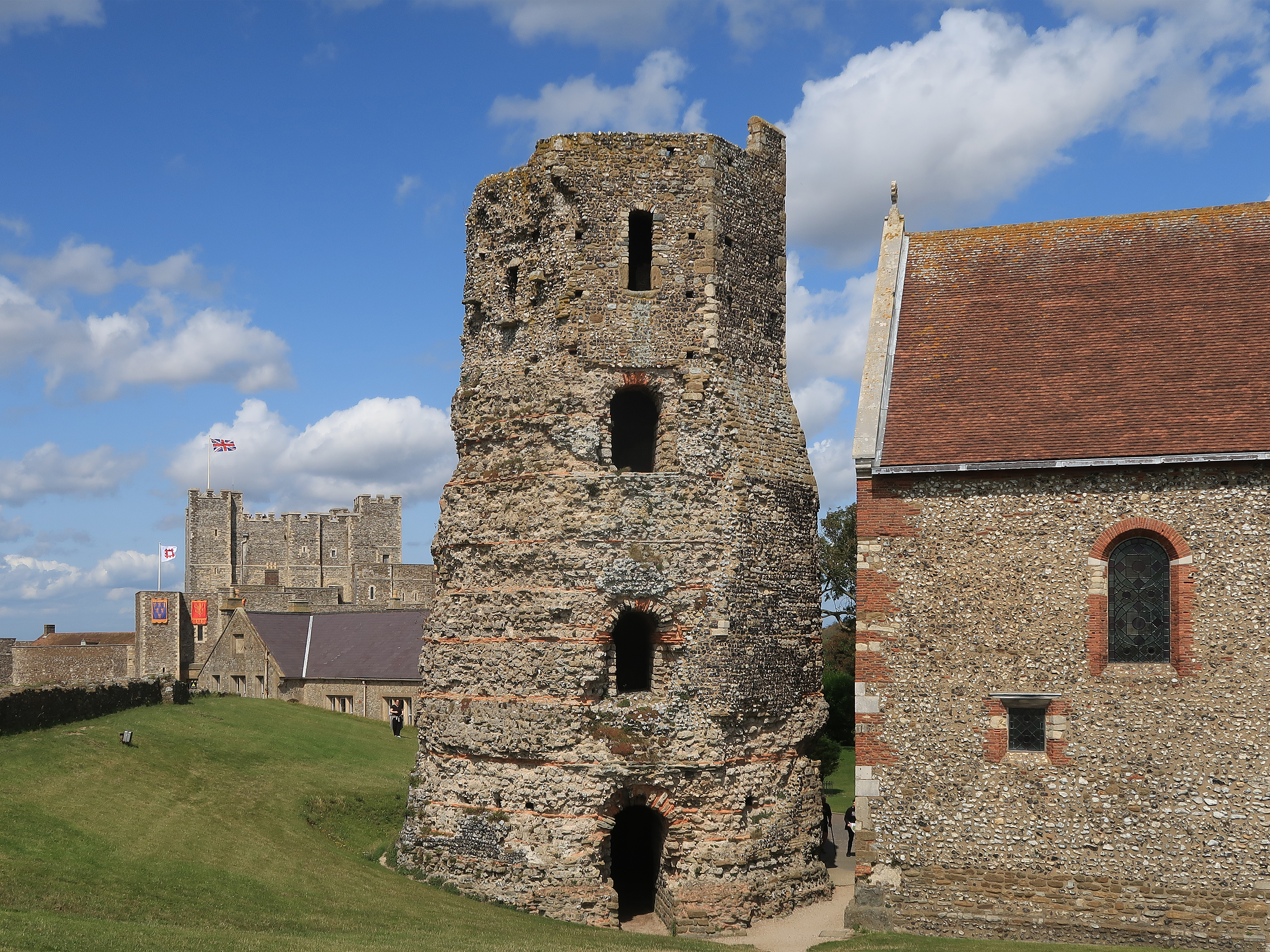
The Roman lighthouse at Dover Castle, which can be seen in the background

Two lighthouses, each called the "Pharos", were built at Dover soon after the Roman conquest. Proposals of their date range from 50 (seven years after the invasion of 43), 80 or (since the building includes tiles identical to the mansio in the town built at that date) c. 138, though the general consensus is for a 1st-century AD date. They were sited on the two heights (Eastern Heights and Western Heights) and modelled on the Tour d'Ordre built for Caligula's aborted invasion at Boulogne.

The one on the Eastern Heights still stands in the grounds of Dover Castle to 80 feet (24 m) high close to its original height, and has been adapted for use as the bell tower of the adjacent castle church of St Mary de Castro. This Roman Pharos has been a Grade I-listed building since 1974. What little remains of the western lighthouse is called the Bredenstone or the Devil's Drop of Mortar after the putative nearby lost village of Braddon, within Drop Redoubt on Dover Western Heights — it was covered in the 18th-century building works but then rediscovered in fresh works in the 1860s, and was the traditional site of the investiture of the Lord Warden of the Cinque Ports.

== Peak ==
At its peak, Dubris was a major trading centre, taking over from Rutupiae as the main Roman cross-Channel port. With Rutupiae, it was one of the starting points for Watling Street, the Roman road to Canterbury and, ultimately, London.

== Roman Painted House ==
During the construction of the new A256/York Street bypass in the 1970s, Roman remains were discovered and an eight-week excavation followed. The archaeologists discovered a Roman mansio now known as the "Roman Painted House". The mansio, a hostel for government officials, was built in c. 200. It was discovered in 1970 by the Kent Archaeological Rescue Unit and, as it houses some of the finest example of Roman murals in Britain (over 400 sq ft (37 m^{2}). of painted plaster, the most extensive ever found north of the Alps), it has been called "Britain's Buried Pompeii".

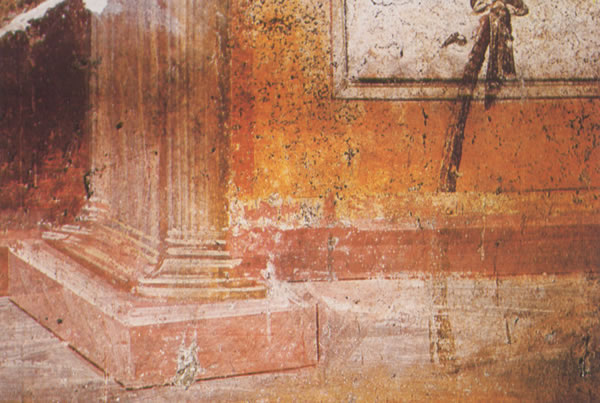
Well-preserved Roman wall painting from Dover

Above a lower dado of red or green, an architectural scheme of multi-coloured panels framed by fluted columns is still visible. The columns sit on projecting bases above a stage, producing a clear 3D effect. Parts of 28 panels survive, each with a motif relating to Bacchus, the Roman god of wine. This Bacchic link, and the building's proximity to the baths, port and fort, has been said by some to suggest that the Painted House was once a brothel. However, this is entirely circumstantial evidence (frescoes in brothels tended to be more explicit, as in those at Pompeii, and Bacchic motifs are very commonly found in simply domestic areas) and so most academics believe the rooms are too small to have supported this line of work and instead support its designation as a mansio.

Other features of the Painted House include the Dover Gems, a medieval cut in the floor allowing the hypocaust system to be viewed, and a medieval skeleton found in the nearby St Martin-le-Grand church, nicknamed "Fred" by the volunteers who keep the museum running.

== Saxon Shore fort ==
Dubris's mansio was demolished in 270 for the construction of a Saxon Shore fort. This demolition preserved the mansio and its wall-paintings better than usual, since the foots of the walls were contained in the fort's rampart.

== Visible remains ==
A small amount of the fort remains is now visible, on request, at Dover Library and Discovery Centre (the former White Cliffs Experience), and a public house off Market Square is built on and named after the Roman Quay.

The most extensive and publicly accessible remains are at the Roman Painted House, where parts of the mansio, Saxon Shore Fort and Classis Britannica fort are all visible.

=== 1980s excavations ===
The town council had plans to build a car park on the site, when the Kent Archaeological Rescue Unit (KARU), led by Brian Philp, began to find Roman remains. After a convoluted battle with the council and the builders, the excavation was allowed to continue and a cover-building was built on the site by KARU while the car park was built elsewhere, with the museum being completed before the car park. It has since received thousands of visitors, including the Queen Mother, who signed a specially-presented guestbook. Philp continues to curate, giving talks to schoolchildren, tourists and academics alike. Other artefacts including an extremely important glass vessel are kept on the site, attracting academic study in recent years.

This cover-building still stands over these remains. It has changed little since then and is now under threat from lack of funding. Many in the local area have commented that the site would have been better presented had it been integrated with the rest of the site, which was instead largely reburied under the new bypass, which was specially inclined to protect the remains and the White Cliffs Experience. All this has been widely criticised by, among others, Philp himself, who has said that “Countries that destroy their past deserve no future.”
