= St Edmund's =

St Edmund's may refer to:

- One of many churches named after a Saint Edmund
- Bury St Edmunds, a market town in Suffolk, England
- St Edmund's School, Canterbury
  - Other schools named after a Saint Edmund
- St Edmund's College, in the University of Cambridge
  - Other colleges named after a Saint Edmund
- St Edmund Hall, in the University of Oxford
- St Edmund's Priory, a former priory in Cambridge
- St Edmund's Township, a former township in Ontario, Canada

== See also ==
- Saint Edmund (disambiguation)
- St. Edmond's Academy
