= Ruth and May Bell =

British twin fashion models

Ruth Bell
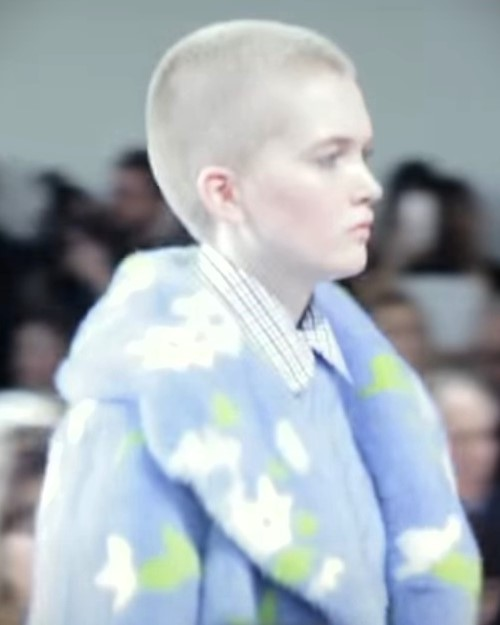
- Bell walks for Michael Kors in New York Fashion Week Fall 2016.
- Born: Ruth Alexandra Bell; 22 May 1996 (age 30); Ashford, Kent, England
- Modelling information
- Height: 1.77 m (5 ft 9 1/2 in)
- Hair colour: Blonde
- Eye colour: Blue
- Agency: The Society Management (New York); Elite Model Management (worldwide); Two Management (Los Angeles); Vivien's Model Management (Sydney)

May Bell
- Born: May Constance Bell; 22 May 1996 (age 30); Ashford, Kent, England
- Modelling information
- Height: 1.77 m (5 ft 9 1/2 in)
- Hair colour: Blonde
- Eye colour: Blue
- Agency: The Society Management (New York); Elite Model Management (worldwide); Model Management (Hamburg); Munich Models (Munich)

Ruth Alexandra Bell and May Constance Bell are British twin fashion models. Ruth Bell ranked as one of the "Top 50" models in the fashion industry by models.com, and currently ranks on their "Money Girls" list. May Bell won the Elite Model Look contest for England. Together they have appeared in campaigns and runways for Dior and Burberry.

== Early lives ==
The Bells were born in Kent, England to Cheryl and Mervyn Bell, a government worker and accountant, respectively, with Ruth being 2 minutes older. They have an older sister, Grace, and grew up in Dover. The family later moved to Walmer near Deal. Ruth had planned to join the Royal Air Force to be a pilot. They were educated at Dover Grammar School for Girls.

== Careers ==
They were discovered in Paris, France, by what turned out to be an Elite Model Management scout, though their mother was skeptical to let him speak to them. Ruth contacted him a year later and after May won the Elite Model Look London contest (she also placed in the top 15 internationally) they subsequently signed with the agency's New York division, The Society Management. At the beginning of their careers, May was treated as the more appealing model while Ruth was only called if a brand wanted to use twins. Ruth personally decided to shave her head, which threatened to breach her contract, though in a twist of fate Alexander McQueen and photographer David Sims requested for a girl to shave their head for a campaign, therefore solidifying her career. Masculine presentation is another factor of her decision to keep her hair short as she found long "pretty" hair to be a nuisance. In her first season, Ruth walked the runway for Gucci, Versace, Saint Laurent, Max Mara, Etro, Lanvin, and Dior. May Bell has appeared in Harper's Bazaar UK, Vogue Italia, and Vogue.

Ruth and May Bell played Jedha Servers in the Star Wars film Rogue One.

== Personal lives ==
Ruth Bell identifies as a butch lesbian.
