= Marcus Sarjeant =

British man who shot blanks at Elizabeth II

- Born: Marcus Simon Sarjeant; 1963 or 1964 (age 62–63); Dover, Kent, England
- Known for: 1981 Trooping the Colour ceremony incident

Marcus Simon Sarjeant (born 1963 or 1964) is a British man who fired six blank shots near Queen Elizabeth II as she rode down The Mall to the Trooping the Colour ceremony in London in 1981.

== Background ==
Sarjeant, who was from Capel-le-Ferne, near Folkestone, Kent, went to Astor Secondary School in Dover. He was a member of the Scouts, becoming local patrol leader before leaving to join the Air Training Corps in 1978. In the ATC, Sarjeant won a marksman's badge, and he owned an air rifle. After leaving school in May 1980 with seven CSE passes, Sarjeant applied to join the Royal Marines but left after three months, saying that officers bullied him. He also tried to join the Army but stayed only for two days of an induction course.

After failed applications to join the police and the fire brigade, he worked at a zoo and at an arts centre in Folkestone. Under the Youth Training Scheme he worked at a youth centre in Hawkinge. Friends reported that Sarjeant joined the Anti-Royalist Movement in October 1980. At the time of the incident at the Trooping the Colour, he was unemployed and living with his mother, while his father was working abroad.

He tried unsuccessfully to find ammunition for his father's .455 Webley revolver. To get a gun licence of his own, he joined a local gun club. Through mail order he paid £66.90 for two blank-firing replica Colt Python revolvers. In the run-up to the annual Trooping the Colour ceremony, Sarjeant sent letters to two magazines, one of which included a picture of him with his father's gun. He also sent a letter to Buckingham Palace which read "Your Majesty. Don't go to the Trooping the Colour ceremony because there is an assassin set up to kill you, waiting just outside the palace". The letter arrived on 16 June.

== Trooping the Colour incident ==
On 13 June 1981, Sarjeant joined the crowds for Trooping the Colour, finding a spot near the junction between The Mall and Horseguards Road. When the Queen came past riding her 19-year-old horse Burmese, Sarjeant quickly fired six blanks from his starting pistol. The horse was momentarily startled but the Queen brought her under control and was unharmed. Lance Corporal Alec Galloway of the Scots Guards seized Sarjeant and pulled him over the crowd control barriers, where Galloway and others disarmed and subdued him. Sarjeant told them, "I wanted to be famous. I wanted to be a somebody".

== Investigation ==
In questioning, Sarjeant said he had been inspired by the assassination of John Lennon in December 1980, and the attempts on the lives of President of the United States Ronald Reagan in March 1981 and of Pope John Paul II in May 1981. In particular, he observed the ease with which Mark David Chapman had become famous after killing John Lennon. A friend said that at the time of John Hinckley Jr.'s attempt on the life of Reagan, Sarjeant had said "I would like to be the first one to take a pot shot at the Queen".

== Trial ==
Sarjeant became the first person since 1966 to be prosecuted under the Treason Act 1842, and was brought to trial before the Lord Chief Justice, Lord Lane, on 14 September 1981. He pleaded guilty and Lord Lane, in sentencing him to five years' imprisonment, said that "the public sense of outrage must be marked. You must be punished for the wicked thing you did". He was found guilty of an offence under Section Two of the Treason Act in that he "wilfully discharged at or near Her Majesty the Queen a gun with the intent to alarm or distress Her Majesty." Sarjeant appealed against the length of the sentence, but the appeal was refused.

== Release ==
After three years in prison which were mostly spent at HMP Grendon Underwood in Buckinghamshire, Sarjeant was released in October 1984 at the age of 20. He changed his name and began a new life. He had written to the Queen from prison to apologise for the shooting but did not receive a reply.

== See also ==
- Christopher John Lewis – New Zealander who attempted to assassinate Queen Elizabeth II
- David Kang – Australian who fired two blank shots from a starting pistol at Charles, Prince of Wales
