= Dover Christ Church Academy =

Location
- Melbourne Avenue; Dover, Kent, CT16 2EG; England; 51°07′43″N 1°17′26″E

Information
- Type: Academy
- Established: 1955
- Local authority: Kent County Council
- Trust: Turner Schools
- Department for Education URN: 150278 Tables
- Ofsted: Reports
- Principal: Jamie MacLean
- Gender: Coeducational
- Age: 11 to 19
- Enrolment: 852 as of August 2023
- Website: dccacademy.org.uk

The Dover Christ Church Academy, previously known as Archers Court Secondary School is a coeducational secondary school and sixth form located in Whitfield, Kent, 4 miles north of Dover.

== School History ==
Archers Court Secondary School opened in 1955 as a Secondary modern and named after the Knight of Archer's Court manor in the parish of Whitfield.

The school was built as a response to growing demand for educational services from new housing estates (Beauxfields, Newlands, Cranleigh Drive, Farncombe Way) in Whitfield and surrounding villages.

During the 1980s, a 6th form was introduced in addition to the existing 11–16 curriculum.

In 1995, Kent Education Committee upgraded Archers Court from a 'high ability' school for pupils aged 11–16 to 'wide ability' taking pupils up to age 18.

In 2002, as part of the Specialist schools programme, the school received special status as a Mathematics and Computing College with subsequent extensions to replace temporary accommodation in 2007 and 2008 and new English and Drama blocks.

In 2008, with inconsistent levels of achievement at GCSEs at well below the Kent average, it was agreed to convert the school to a government-funded academy. The main driver was a ‘structural solution’ to ensure that the school achieved at least 30% 5 A*-C grades at GCSE level including English and Maths.

In 2010, sponsored by Canterbury Christ Church University and co-sponsored by Dover Grammar School for Boys, Dover Grammar School for Girls and Kent County Council, the school was relaunched as Dover Christ Church Academy and received academy status.

In 2014, the school underwent an £11.9 million refurbishment. The new extension included specialist and vocational teaching spaces including science laboratories, hair, beauty, textiles, and catering. The sports hall was extended with remodelled dance and fitness suites, and new changing room facilities. The project was completed in late 2015.

In 2017, Dover Christ Church Academy became an International Baccalaureate (IB) World School with the aim to offer the International Baccalaureate Career-Related Programme (IBCP) to its 6th form students.

In September 2023 the school joined the Turner Schools trust.

== Aspen 2 ==
The college has a specialist unit, Aspen 2, which provides services for students with profound, severe and complex needs.

== Admissions ==
The school is non-selective and participates in the Kent County Council Co-ordinated Admission Scheme.

=== Headteachers ===
- DE Rawlins, (1955-1975)
- John Bates, (1975-1990)
- Stuart Alcock, (1990–2002)
- Elaine Hamilton, (2002–2010)
- Richard Williams, (2010-2012)
- Samantha Williamson, (2012-2017)
- Jamie McLean, (2017-)

== Recent School Inspections ==
OFSTED rated the school as 3 or "Requires Improvement" on 4 consecutive visits, in 2012, 2014, 2016 and 2019.

== Academic Results ==
- A Level

In 2018, the school's progress 8 score was rated "Average" by the UK dept of education. The average grade and average points that students achieved per A Level entry was 20.49 (or A Level grade D).

- GCSE

In 2018, the school's progress 8 score was rated “Well below average” by the UK Dept of education. The number of students entered for the English Baccalaureate (or EBacc) and taking up to 8 GCSEs across 5 "subject pillars" was 8%. Average grade point score for those entered was 2.26 (or legacy GCSE grade E). 10% achieved grade 5 (or legacy GCSE high grade C) and above in English Language and Mathematics.
