= St. Edmund's Church =

St. Edmund's Church or similar variations can refer to numerous churches:

== Norway ==
- St. Edmund's Church, Oslo

== United Kingdom ==
- Church of the Holy Trinity with St Edmund, Bristol
- Church of St Edmund, Sedgefield, County Durham
- St Edmund's Church, Castleton, Derbyshire
- St Edmund's Church, Fenny Bentley, Derbyshire
- St Edmund's Church, Rochdale, Greater Manchester
- St Edmund's Church, Southampton, Hampshire
- St Edmund's Church, Wootton, Isle of Wight
- St Edmund's Chapel, Dover, Kent
- St Edmund's Church, Lincoln, Lincolnshire
- St Edmund's Church, Beckenham, London
- St Edmund, King and Martyr, City of London
- St Edmund of Canterbury, Whitton, London
- St Edmund's Church, Forest Gate, London
- Church of St Edmund, Acle, Norfolk
- Church of St Edmund, Taverham, Norfolk
- St Edmund's Church, Norwich, Norfolk
- Church of St Edmund, Hardingstone, Northamptonshire
- Church of St Edmund King and Martyr, Kellington, North Yorkshire
- Church of St Edmund, Mansfield Woodhouse, Nottinghamshire
- St Edmund's Church, Holme Pierrepont, Nottinghamshire
- St Edmund's Church, Walesby, Nottinghamshire
- Our Lady and St Edmund's Church, Abingdon, Oxfordshire
- St Edmund's Church, Crickhowell, Powys
- St Edmund's Church, Bury St Edmunds, Suffolk
- St Edmund's Church, Southwold, Suffolk
- St Edmund Church, Godalming, Surrey
- St Edmund's Chapel, Gateshead, Tyne and Wear
- Church of St Edmund, Dudley, West Midlands
- Catholic Church of St Oswald and St Edmund Arrowsmith, Ashton-in-Makerfield, Wigan
- St Edmund's Church, Salisbury, Wiltshire

== United States ==
- St. Edmund's Anglican Church, Elm Grove, Wisconsin

== See also ==
- Saint Edmund (disambiguation)
