= St Edmund's School, Ipswich =

St Edmund's School, Ipswich may refer to:

- St Edmunds College, Ipswich, a Catholic secondary day school for boys in Ipswich, Queensland, Australia
- St Edmund's School, a former preparatory school in Ipswich, Suffolk and then at Kesgrave Hall

== See also ==
- St. Edmund's College (disambiguation)
- St Edmund's School (disambiguation)
