= King's Hall, Dover =

King's Hall Buzz Bingo
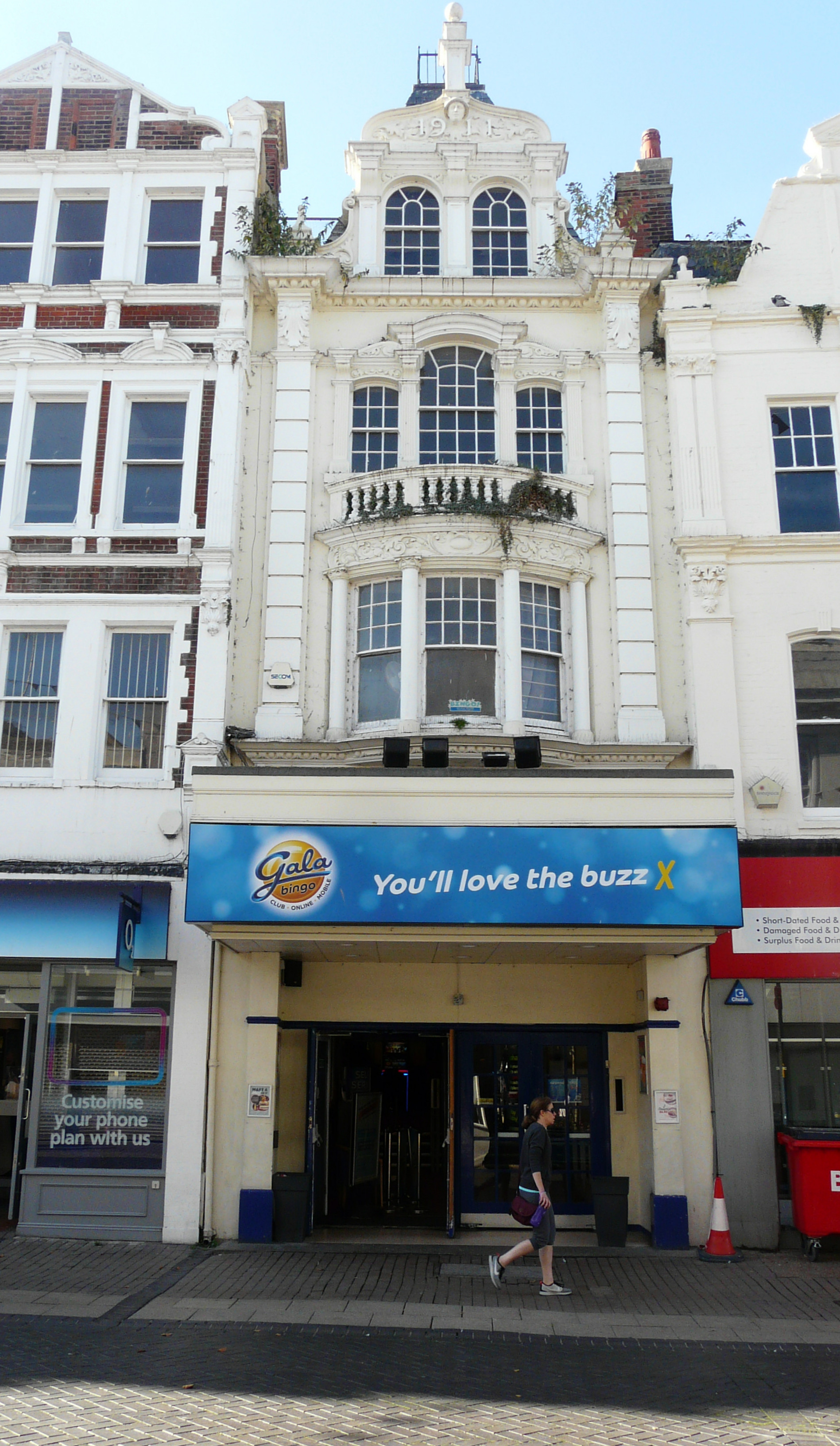
- The building in 2018
- Interactive map of the King's Hall; Buzz Bingo area

General information
- Location: Dover, Kent, 49 Biggin Street, England
- Coordinates: 51°07′35.2″N 1°18′42.2″E
- Opened: 1911

King's Hall is a former cinema, now a bingo club, in Dover, Kent, England. Dating from 1911, it was later called the Gaumont and remained a cinema until 1960. It has been a bingo club since 1961, from 2018 named Buzz Bingo.

== History ==
The King's Hall was the first purpose-built cinema in Dover, with the frontage in Biggin Street, and the cinema extending into the ground behind. It was designed by A.H. Steele for Dover's Picture Palace Co. Ltd, and seated 800; there was also a stage for live entertainment. The cinema opened in October 1911, showing a film in Kinemacolor of the unveiling of the Victoria Memorial in London.

During the First World War the cinema was acquired by Harry Day, a theatrical entrepreneur and later a politician, who owned it until 1928. Because of increased competition in Dover, the cinema was refurbished in 1931, with seating for 1,050. In 1934 it was acquired by Gaumont-British, and new sound equipment was installed. On 29 December 1937, most of the building was destroyed in a fire, with only the entrance façade saved. It was rebuilt in 1939 for the new owners Keystone Cinemas Ltd, to the designs of Verity & Beverley, architects of many cinemas in the 1920s and 1930s.

It was requisitioned by the Royal Navy during the Second World War, and was used to train recruits in the use of gunnery aiming equipment. In 1943 it was taken over by Odeon Cinemas. It re-opened on 14 July 1947 with the film Frieda; David Farrar, who starred in the film, made a personal appearance. The name of the cinema changed to Gaumont in 1951. It closed in 1960, and opened the following year as a bingo club; from 2018 it was named Buzz Bingo.
