= Royal Victoria Hospital, Dover =

Royal Victoria Hospital
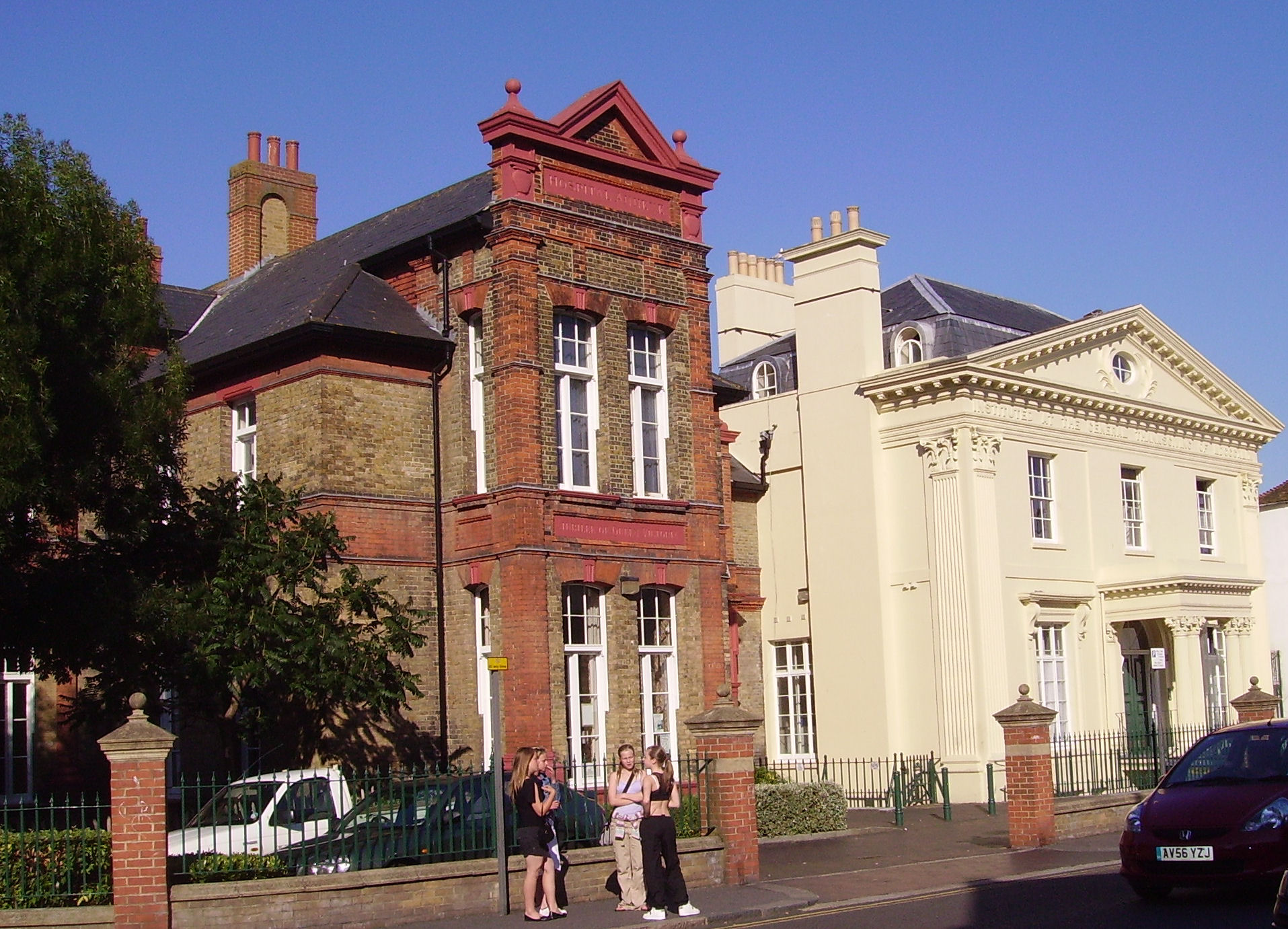
- The (red-brick) Annex on the left and the original (cream-coloured) Dispensary on the right

- Shown in Kent

Geography
- Location: High Street, Dover, England, United Kingdom
- Coordinates: 51.1287°N 1.308°E

Organisation
- Care system: NHS
- Type: General

History
- Founded: 1851
- Closed: 1987

Links
- Lists: Hospitals in England

The Royal Victoria Hospital was a health facility in the High Street in Dover, Kent, England. The original hospital is a Grade II listed building.

== History ==
The hospital was established by the conversion of an early 19th century mansion known as Brook House to form the Dover Dispensary in 1851. An annex was added to celebrate the Golden Jubilee of Queen Victoria in 1887. It became the Dover Hospital in 1893 and the Royal Victoria Hospital in 1902. It joined the National Health Service in 1948. After services had transferred to the Buckland Hospital, it closed in May 1987 and the buildings were subsequently converted into apartments.
