= Astor Secondary School =

Location
- Astor Avenue; Dover, Kent, CT17 0AS; England; 51°07′36″N 1°17′20″E

Information
- Type: Academy
- Motto: Adaptable, Creative, Proud
- Established: 1948
- Local authority: Kent County Council
- Trust: Samphire Star Education Trust (Formerly The Dover Federation for the Arts Multi Academy Trust)
- Specialist: Arts (visual arts) - 2002 to 2010
- Department for Education URN: 138167 Tables
- Ofsted: Reports
- Principal: Lee Kane
- Gender: Mixed
- Age range: 11–18
- Enrolment: 879 (2019)
- Capacity: 1,400
- Website: www.astorschool.com

Astor Secondary School is an 11–18 mixed, secondary school and sixth form with academy status in Dover, Kent, England. It was established in 1948 and is part of The Samphire Star Education Trust.

== History ==
The school traces its origins back to Christ Church National School and later Christchurch Church of England (C of E) Girls School. In 1929, Christchurch moved to Astor Avenue Elementary School, subsequently Astor Primary School, named after Violet Astor, wife of John Jacob Astor, 1st Baron Astor of Hever, Unionist MP for Dover (1922–1945) with the avenue joining Tower Hamlets and Elms Vale after her husband.

During the 1930s, the school operated from the same locale but as Astor Avenue Council School and, in 1939, for senior girls only (over age 11) but including boys and infants during the war and temporarily evacuated to Monmouthshire.

Astor Secondary School opened in 1948 and one of two new secondary modern schools founded in the immediate post-war years serving Dover, the other, Castlemount Secondary School, closed in 1991.

In 1951, with the recent introduction of a secondary modern, staff and pupils transferred to a new adjoining building to the elementary school comprising an assembly hall and practical rooms and a new headmaster was appointed in 1953. Astor Primary School continued, albeit separately. In 1974, the secondary modern split into 2 sites with the senior or "upper" school moving to a multi-purpose building and mobile classrooms set into the hillside alongside Dover Grammar School for Boys.

In 1990, with the impending closure of Castlemount and projected growth in student numbers to circa 1,400, a proposal was submitted by Kent County Council for the adjacent grammar school to relocate to the Castlemount site on the east side of Dover with ex-buildings and playing fields to be taken over by Astor School but this was abandoned. In 1995, the Kent Education Committee upgraded the school from 'high ability', principally serving pupils aged 11–16, to 'wide ability' and up to age 18.

In 1999, the school consolidated into a single site and a major building and refurbishment programme was completed that included a new science block. Astor Primary, renamed Priory Fields Primary School moved into the original 1951 "modern" structure which was upgraded until final demolishment and a complete rebuild in 2017.

In 2002, as part of the specialist schools programme, Astor was allowed to concentrate in the arts, and in particular, the visual arts. It became an Arts College and retains this status today. Astor also participated in a post-16 consortium with other secondary schools in the area and a college of further education, East Kent College. In 2008, it federated with 3 other schools, Barton Junior School, Shatterlocks Infant and Nursery School, and White Cliffs Primary College for the Arts to form the Dover Federation of the Arts (DFA),

In 2012, it became an academy with The Dover Federation for the Arts Multi Academy Trust. In 2022 the Trust changed its name to Samphire Star Education Trust.

== In popular culture ==
Astor Secondary School featured in the first episode of Telford's Change, a 1979 BBC television series set partly in Dover.

== Notable alumni ==
Marcus Sarjeant, assassination attempt on Queen Elizabeth II during Trooping the Colour ceremony, June 1981

== Headteachers ==
- Gwendolen Jenkins, (1948–1953)
- William Beal, (1953–1964)
- Kenneth Farmer, (1964–1988)
- Christopher Russell, (1988–2007)
- Caroline Donovan, (2007–2012)
- Edward Pallant, (2012–2015)
- Sue Knight-Fotheringham (interim), (2015–2016)
- Lee Kane (2016–present)

== CEO ==
- Christopher Russell 2007 to 2018
- David Meades 2018 to date
