= Maxton, Kent =

Coordinates: 51.1204°N 1.2889°E

Maxton
- Suburb
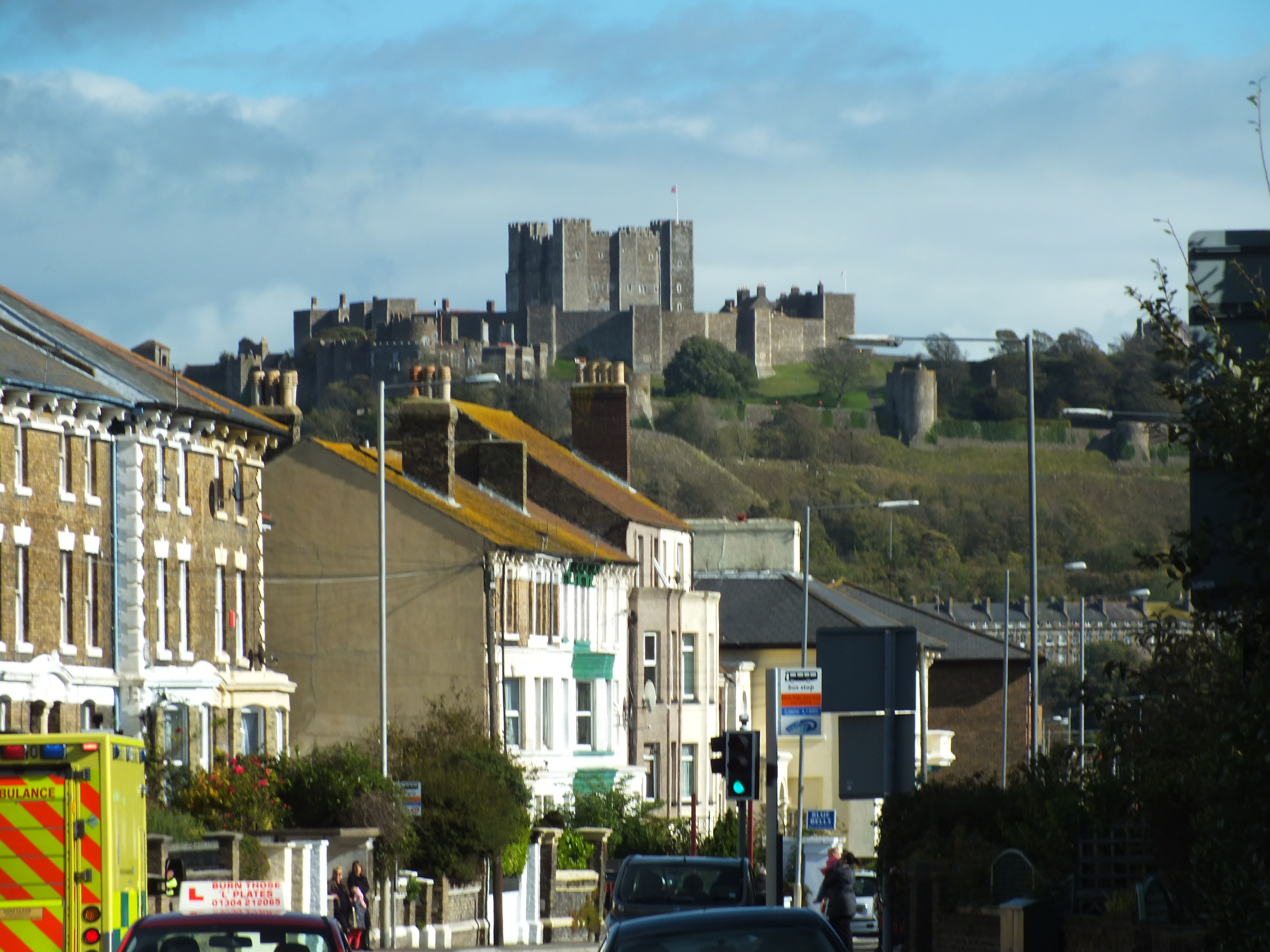
- View of Dover Castle from Maxton

- Location within Kent
- Population: 4,005
- OS grid reference: TR302408
- District: Dover
- Shire county: Kent
- Region: South East
- Country: England
- Sovereign state: United Kingdom
- Post town: Dover
- Postcode district: CT17
- Dialling code: 01304
- Police: Kent
- Fire: Kent
- Ambulance: South East Coast
- UK Parliament: Dover and Deal

Maxton is an area in the west of Dover, in the county of Kent, England. Maxton also served as the terminus of the tramway system serving the town until its closure in 1938.

Maxton originated from Maxton Manor, a medieval manor house that can trace its roots to the reign of King Henry III. In the 1800s Maxton was separate to Dover but by the start of the twentieth century Maxton was now a suburb of Dover. By the mid-1900s Maxton had a brewery, several shops including a post office, petrol station and a fish and chips shop which have all since closed. The Orange Tree Pub was the local pub in Maxton but closed in 2002.
