= St Edmund's School (disambiguation) =

St Edmund's School is an independent day and boarding school in Canterbury, England.

St Edmund's School may also refer to:

== England ==
- St Edmund's School, Hindhead, Surrey
- St Edmund's School, Ipswich (disambiguation)
- St Edmund's Catholic School, Dover
- St Edmund's Catholic School, Portsmouth
- St Edmund's Girls' School, Salisbury

== United States ==
- St. Edmund Preparatory High School (Brooklyn), New York

== See also ==
- St. Edmund's College (disambiguation)
- St Edmund's Catholic Academy
