= St Edmund's Catholic School, Dover =

St Edmund's Catholic School

Location
- Old Charlton Road; Dover, Kent, CT16 2QB; England; 51°08′09″N 1°18′28″E

Information
- Type: Academy
- Religious affiliation: Roman Catholic
- Established: 1962
- Local authority: Kent County Council
- Trust: Kent Catholic Schools Partnership
- Department for Education URN: 141217 Tables
- Gender: Co-educational
- Age: 11 to 16
- Enrolment: 503 as of August 2020
- Houses: Kolbe, Bakhita, Francis, Cecilia
- Colours: K=red, B=blue, F=purple, C=green
- Website: School website

St Edmund's Catholic School is a co-educational Roman Catholic secondary school located in Dover, Kent, England. The school is named after Edmund of Abingdon, and is under the jurisdiction of the Roman Catholic Archdiocese of Southwark.

== History ==
St Edmund of Canterbury Roman Catholic (RC) School opened in 1962 as a Secondary modern to serve the Catholic community in and around Dover. The school was the 4th and last secondary modern to establish in Dover.

The school’s catchment area is large and serves eight Roman Catholic parishes in Deal, Dover, Folkestone, Hythe and Aylsham and initially catered for 280 pupils. 4 houses were created, all named after English Catholic martyrs. John Ireland (1543), John Stone (martyr) (1538), Margaret Clitherow (1556-1586) and Ann Line (1563-1601).

In 1988, the school approached Kent County Council to purchase the site occupied by Castlemount Secondary School earmarked for closure in 1991 and vacate existing premises to meet growth plans. This was agreed in principle but the council eventually reneged to explore other options and the land was sold-off to developers.

In 1990, its sixth form was expanded with exchange arrangements with Dover Grammar School for Girls in some A Level subjects.

In 1997, new purpose-built blocks providing teaching areas for English, mathematics, design and technology, and information technology were constructed on an existing playing field to replace mobile classrooms and increase teaching space outside of the main 1960s edifice.

In 2003, as part of the Specialist schools programme, the school was awarded specialist status in the arts with an emphasis on the performing arts. A new Business Enterprise Centre with adult education facilities and an internet café was erected adjacent to Charlton Church of England (C of E) Primary School.

In 2004, a recording and broadcasting studio, complete with a feed to local and national media joined the new dance studio, both visited by Archbishop Kevin McDonald in 2007. Further participation in a 6th form consortium including the 2 grammar schools ensured a greater breadth of choice for students at A Level.

In 2008, the school joined the Federation of Dover Catholic Schools comprising St Richard's Catholic Primary School with the executive head responsible for both educational entities.

In 2013, an OFSTED inspection rated the school as 4 or "Inadequate" and was placed into special measures with a rescue mission from St George's Church of England Foundation School in Broadstairs providing initial support. The school later partnered with St Thomas More Catholic School, Eltham.

Previously a voluntary aided school administered by Kent County Council, in July 2016 St Edmund's Catholic School converted to academy status. The school is now sponsored by the Kent Catholic Schools Partnership.

In 2017, with falling numbers and budget constraints, the school announced it was planning to close its existing sixth form with students wishing to further their studies to make provisions elsewhere.

== Admissions ==
The school is non-selective and participates in the Kent County Council Co-ordinated Admission Scheme.

== Headteacher s ==
- Michael Mummery, (1962–1985)
- Thomas Connolly, (1985–1999)
- Christopher Atkin, (1999–2013)
- Kim Stoner (Interim), (2013–2014)
- Catrina Hamilton, (2014–2015)
- Michael Wilson, (2015–2020)
- Grainne Parsons, (2020-)

== Recent School Inspections ==
In 2014, OFSTED rated the school as 3 or "Requires Improvement" and, again, in 2019, as an academy.

== Academic Results ==
- GCSE

In 2018, the school’s progress 8 score was rated “Well below average” by the UK dept of education. The number of students entered for the English Baccalaureate (or EBacc) and taking up to 8 GCSEs across 5 "subject pillars" was 35%. Average grade point score for those entered was 2.94 (or legacy GCSE grades D/E). 21% achieved grade 5 (or legacy GCSE high grade C) and above in English Language and Mathematics.
