= Horses gifted by the RCMP to the monarch of Canada =

Canadian horse (1962-1990)

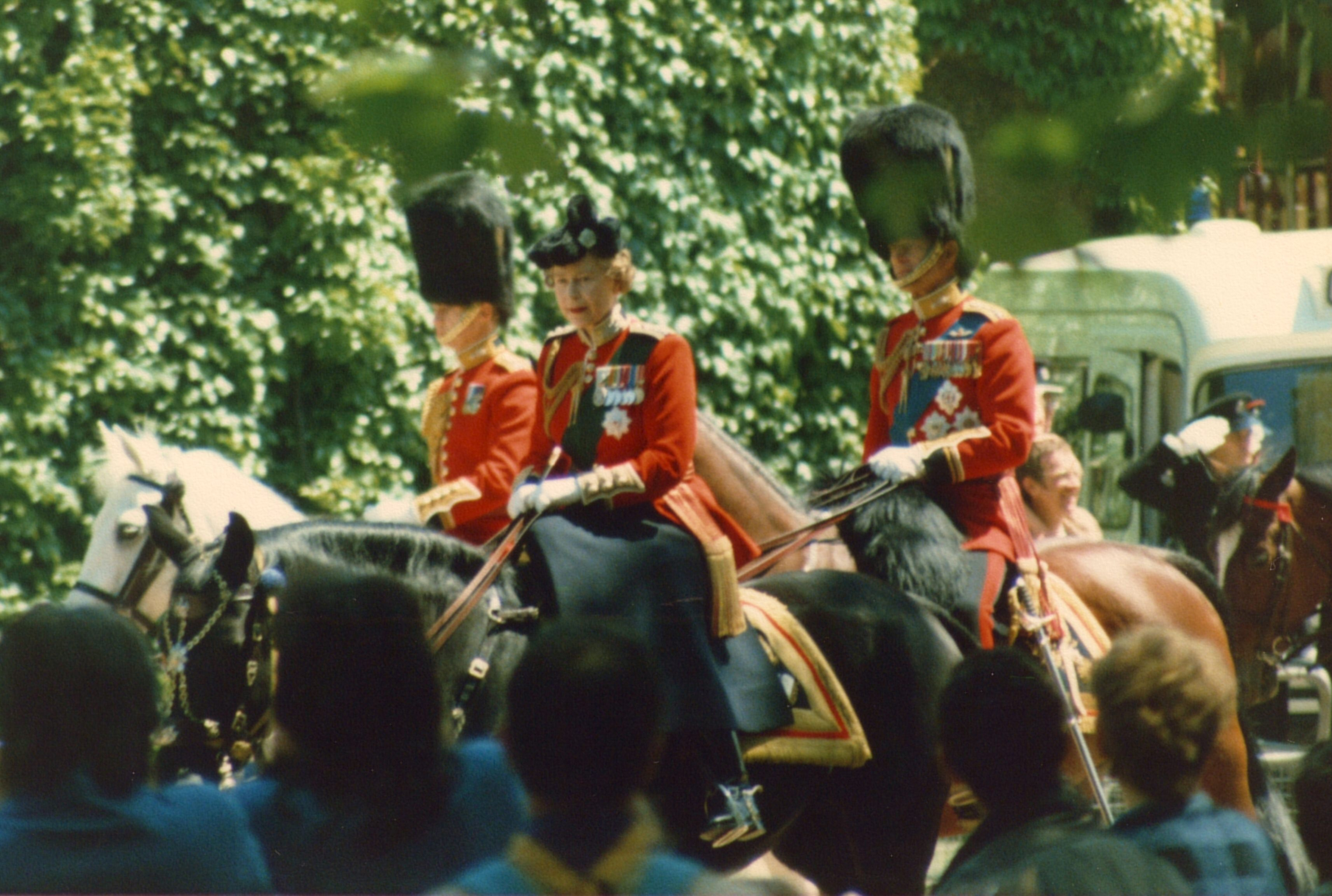
Queen Elizabeth II riding Burmese during Trooping the Colour for the last time in 1986

The Royal Canadian Mounted Police has, between 1969 and 2023, presented seven police service horses from the Musical Ride unit to two of Canada's monarchs: six horses to Queen Elizabeth II and one to King Charles III. PSH Burmese was used by Elizabeth for Trooping the Colour between 1969 and 1986. Charles has done the same with PSH Noble since 2023.

== Elizabeth II ==
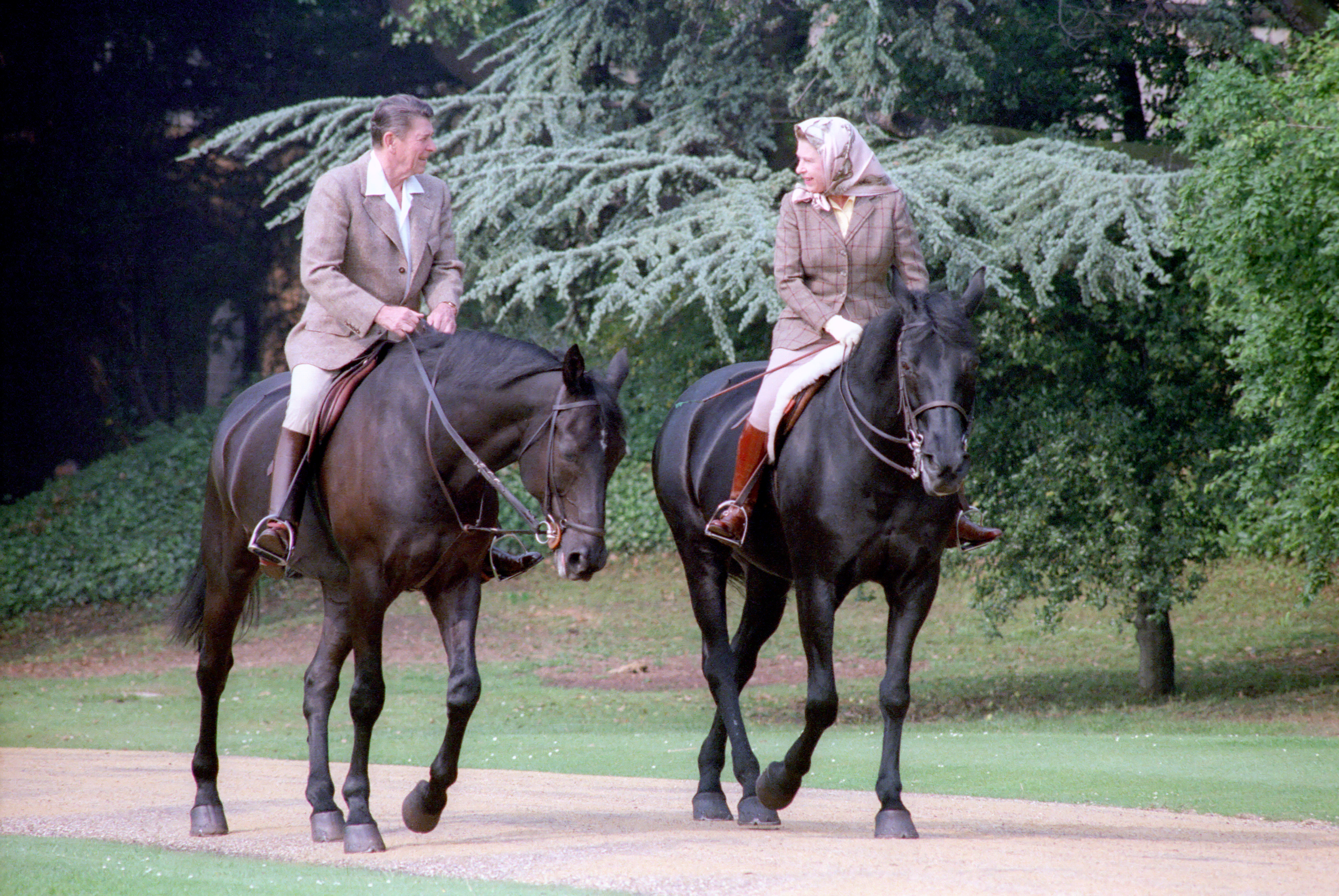
The Queen on Burmese at Windsor in 1982, during a visit by Ronald Reagan, who was lent the 8-year-old gelding Centenial for the occasion

Burmese was a black police service horse (PSH) mare given to Queen Elizabeth II by the Royal Canadian Mounted Police and ridden by the Queen for Trooping the Colour for 18 consecutive years from 1969.

Burmese was foaled at the Royal Canadian Mounted Police Remount Ranch, at Fort Walsh, Saskatchewan, and trained at Depot Division, in Regina, and in Ottawa by RCMP Staff Sergeant Fred Rasmussen. Staff Sergeant Ralph Cave, the Riding Master for the Musical Ride, suggested in 1968 that the RCMP gift one of the ride's horses to the Queen. Both the federal Cabinet and the RCMP's Commissioner supported the idea and, on 28 April 1969, Staff Cave presented Burmese to Elizabeth when members of the RCMP came to the UK to perform in the Royal Windsor Horse Show. The Queen asked that Burmese be included in the performance and that her rider carry the Queen's royal standard, instead of the normal red and white pennon, so Elizabeth could more easily follow Burmese in the show.

Elizabeth was mounted on Burmese when six blank shots were fired during the 1981 birthday parade, on the way to Trooping the Colour. Although the horse was briefly startled, she remained calm due to the training she had received. This included experience of gunfire during recruit training, when staff would fire blank rounds as recruits took horses through their paces. The royal family praised Burmese's behaviour during this incident.

Burmese's last public appearance was at Trooping the Colour in 1986, after which she was retired. She was not replaced, as the Queen decided to henceforth ride in a phaeton and review the troops from a dais, rather than train a new charger. Burmese was put out to pasture at Windsor Great Park, where she died in 1990. When the Queen was asked years later which was her favourite horse, her immediate reply was "Burmese".

PSH Burmese was followed by PSH Centenial, also trained by Rasmussen and presented to the Queen in 1973 to celebrate the 100th anniversary of the RCMP. (The spelling of Centenial was changed by the Queen from the original spelling of Centennial.) Elizabeth received PSH Saint James in 1998, to mark the RCMP's 125th anniversary; PSH Golden Jubilee in 2002, in honour of the Queen's Golden Jubilee; and PSH George in 2009, to commemorate the 40th anniversary of the gifting of Burmese to the Queen. On 10 May 2012, the RCMP presented the monarch with PSH Elizabeth, named for the Queen's late mother, Queen Elizabeth The Queen Mother.

== Charles III ==
The RCMP gifted Elizabeth's son and successor, and honorary Commissioner of the RCMP, King Charles III, with a Musical Ride horse named Noble, on 11 March 2023, to mark the 150th anniversary of the force's founding. The King requested a horse from the Musical Ride to eventually use as his new charger horse in Trooping the Colour parades; he had, thus far, been using PSH George since that horse was given to Queen Elizabeth II.

== Statues ==
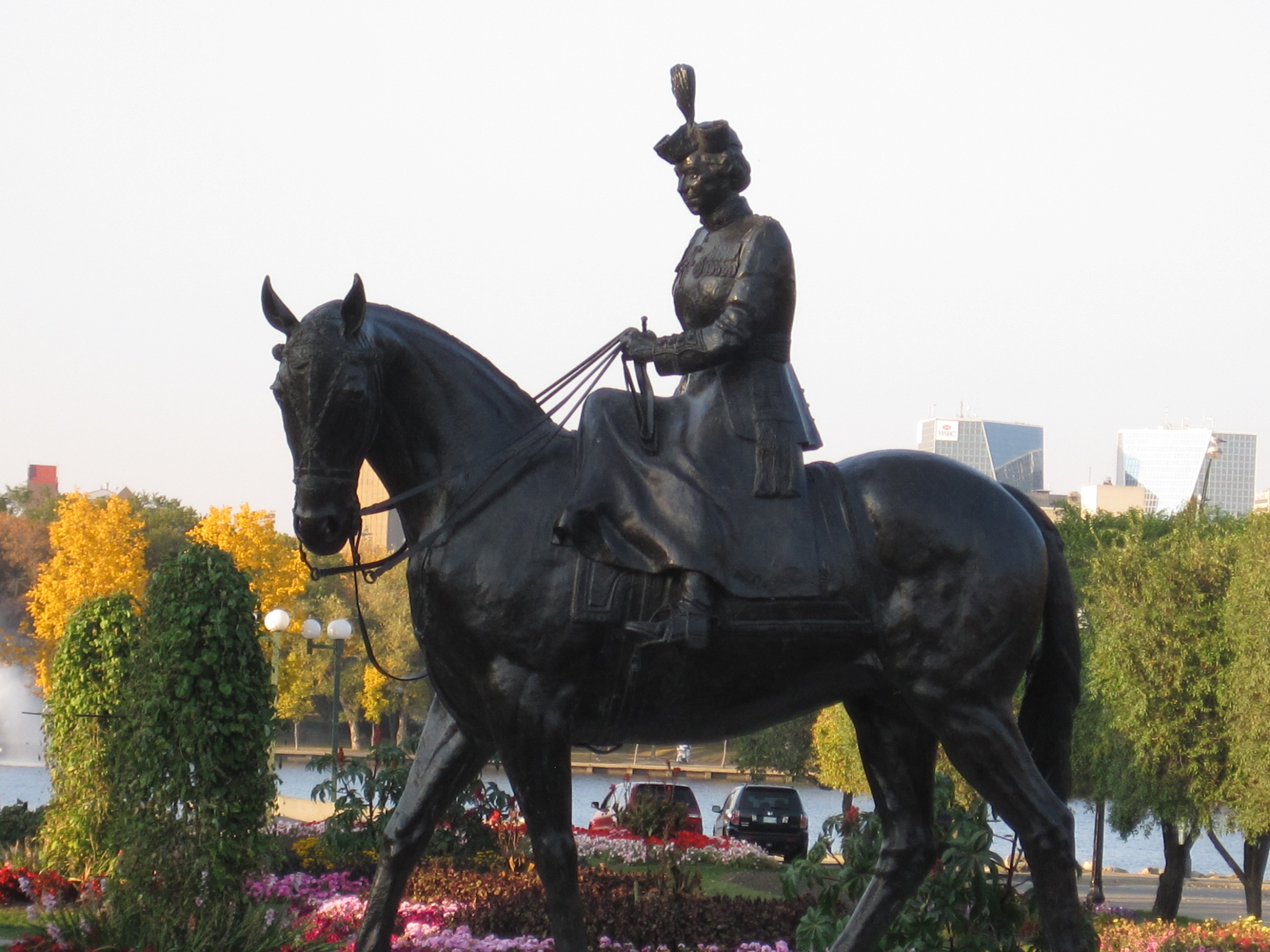
Burmese

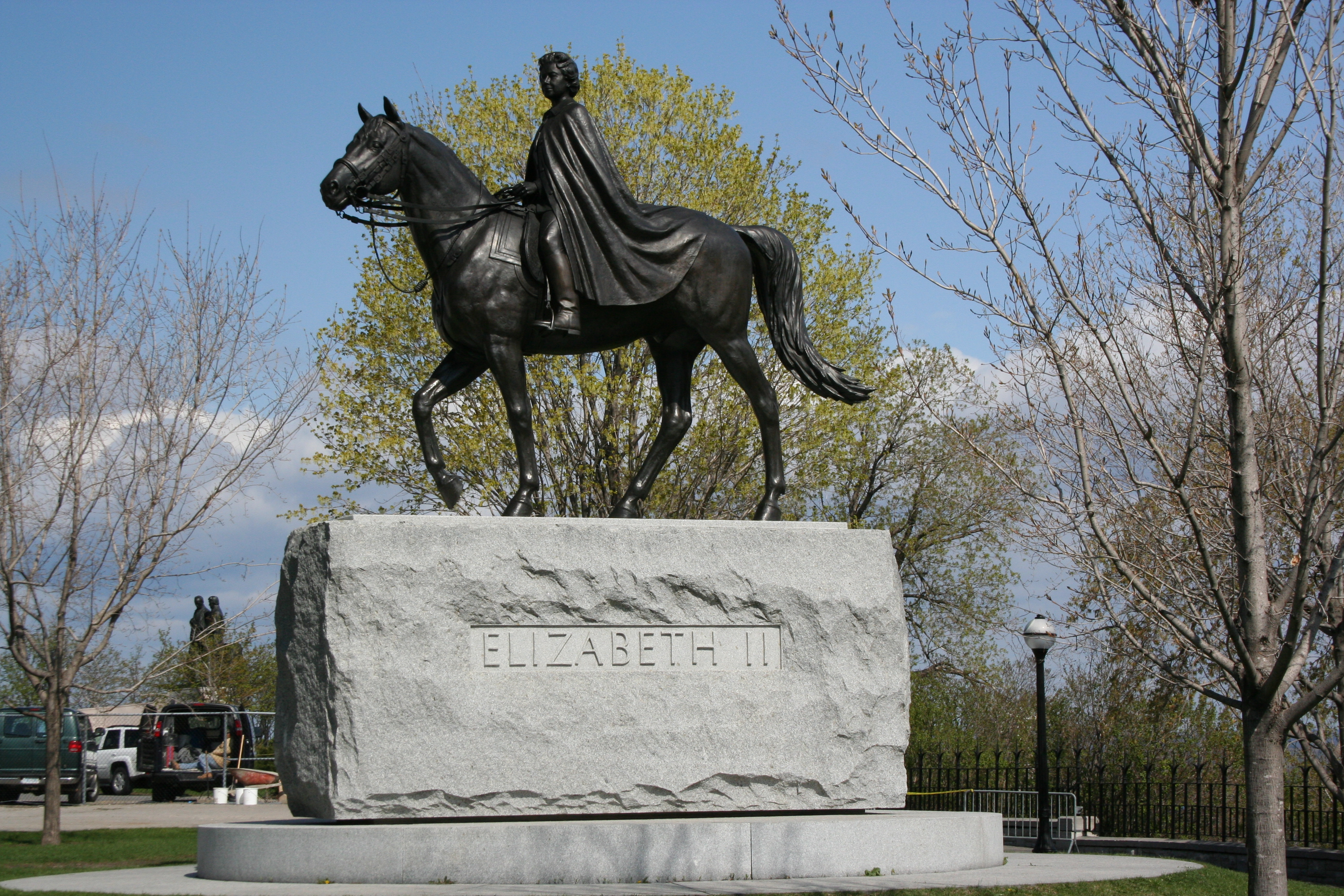
Centenial

During Saskatchewan's centennial in 2005, Queen Elizabeth II unveiled, in front of the Legislative Building in Regina, a bronze statue depicting her on Burmese. The statue was sculpted by Saskatchewan artist Susan Velder.

A statue of Elizabeth II riding Centenial was unveiled on Parliament Hill in Ottawa, Ontario, on 1 July 1992, Canada Day in the 40th year of Elizabeth II's reign as Queen of Canada and the 125th anniversary of Confederation. A team of 10 people took two years to complete the monument. When a decade-long renovation of the buildings in the parliamentary complex began, the statue was moved to the centre of the roundabout outside the main gate to the monarch's official residence in Ottawa, Rideau Hall.

== See also ==
- Monarchy in Saskatchewan
- Queen Elizabeth's horses
- List of historical horses
