= Saint Edmund =

Saint Edmund may refer to:

- Edmund the Martyr (d. 869), king of East Anglia who was venerated as a martyr saint soon after his death at the hands of Vikings
- Edmund of Abingdon (c. 1174 – 1240), English prelate who served as Archbishop of Canterbury.
- Edmund Arrowsmith (1585–1628), Jesuit, one of the Forty Martyrs of England and Wales
- Edmund Campion (1540–1581), English Jesuit priest and martyr, one of the Forty Martyrs of England and Wales
- Edmund Gennings (1567–1591), English priest and martyr, one of the Forty Martyrs of England and Wales
- MV St Edmund, a British Rail car ferry

== See also ==
- Saint-Edmond
- St Edmund's (disambiguation)
- Edmund (given name)
- Saint Edward
