= St. Edmund's Anglican Church =

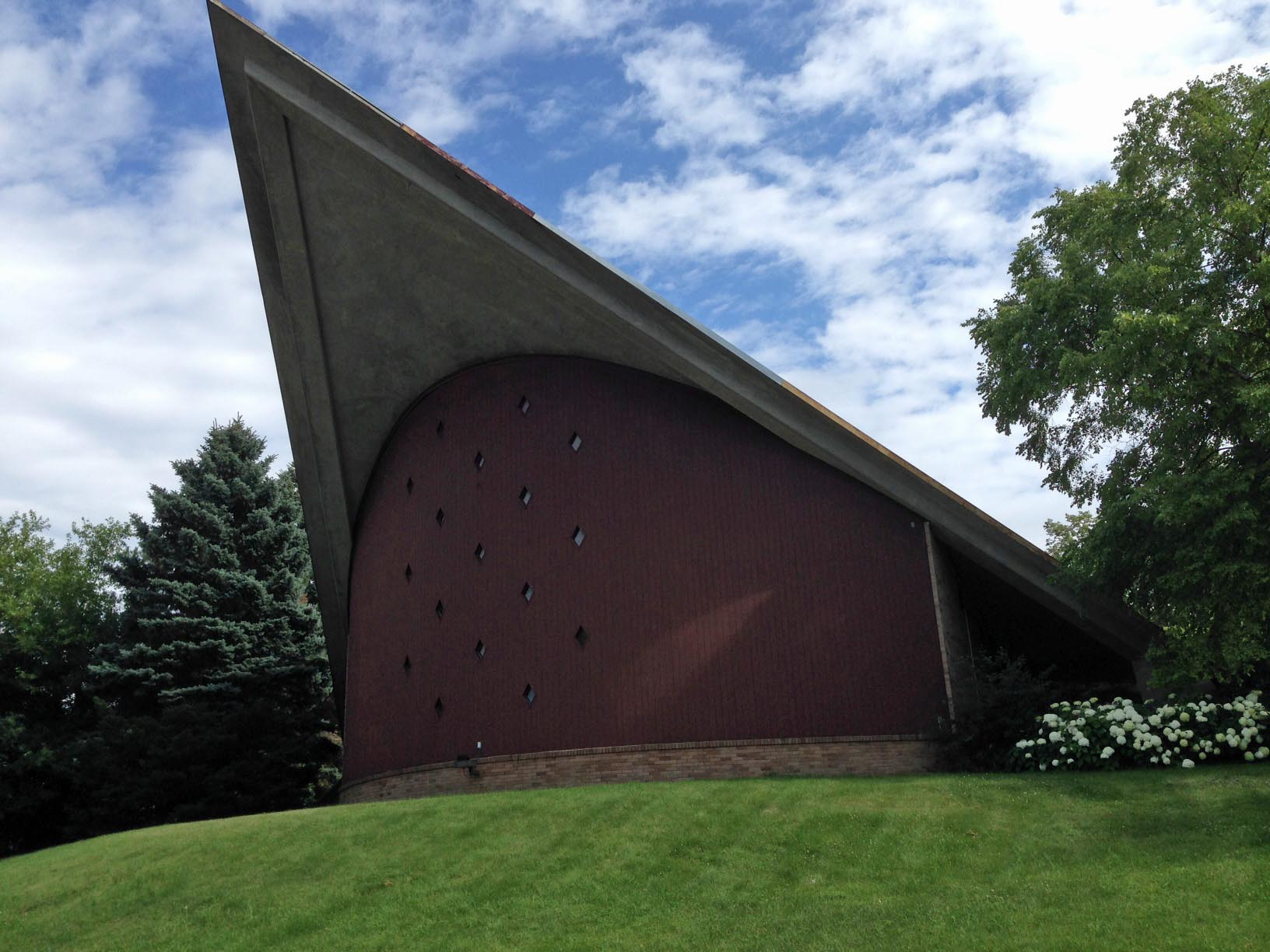
- St. Edmund's Anglican Church
- Location: Elm Grove, Wisconsin
- Country: United States
- Denomination: Convocation of Anglicans in North America

History
- Dedication: Edmund the Martyr

Architecture
- Architect: William P. Wenzler
- Style: Mid-century Modern
- Completed: 1957

St. Edmund's Anglican Church was a parish of the Convocation of Anglicans in North America in Elm Grove, Wisconsin.

Formerly known as St. Edmund's Episcopal Church, the congregation became in 2008 the first in Wisconsin to withdraw from the Episcopal Church to join the Anglican realignment, a conservative movement of Anglicans in the United States and Canada formed primarily in opposition to the Episcopal Church's support for the ordination of non-celibate gay people.

== History ==
St. Edmund's was founded 1947 by a small group of Christian laity and clergy meeting in temporary facilities in the village of Elm Grove, Waukesha County, Wisconsin. Within a decade the group had raised sufficient funds to construct their own building on land donated to the congregation by members of their community on Watertown Plank Road in the village. In 1962, St. Edmund's voted to affiliate with the Episcopal Church in the United States of America and became part of the ECUSA Diocese of Milwaukee.

Bishop Donald Hallock granted St. Edmund's the charter of an earlier defunct parish in his diocese dedicated to St. Edmond (Edmund), King of East Anglia. The free grant of the charter provided the 15-year-old parish with honorific roots to Christian ministry in Milwaukee dating to 1874 and Anglican historical connections stretching back almost 1,100 years.

By 1976, the church was a congregation with more than 400 members. In 1976 the parish vestry chose Wayne Carr Olmstead to serve as rector. Olmstead remained in the position for the next 30 years, serving both the parishioners of St. Edmund's and young men studying for the ministry from Nashotah House Seminary. Olmstead's tenure proved controversial because of his high-church style and traditionalist theological approach, which limited the role of girls and women in church services. A large number of congregants left the parish in the years following Olmstead's appointment, including a substantial number of major donors, weakening its financial base. What remained was a smaller and more conservative group of worshippers.

After Olmstead died on March 13, 2006, the disconnect sharpened between the faith and practice of St. Edmund's Church, the Diocese of Milwaukee and the Episcopal Church. In particular, the St. Edmund's congregation took issue with the Episcopal Church's acceptance of non-celibate gay people.

An absolute majority of St. Edmund's Church voted in December 2008 to remain within the Anglican Communion while disassociating itself completely from the Episcopal Church. The congregation was immediately received into the Convocation of Anglicans in North America, the American mission of the Church of Nigeria, the largest Anglican province in the world.

In December 2011, St. Edmund's lost a court case brought by the Episcopal Diocese of Milwaukee, and a judge ruled the parishioners must relinquish all church property and vacate the church building. They did so in January 2012, although the diocese accused the departing members of vandalizing the altar with Hebrew letters that approximated the words "God no longer lives here." Several graves on the church grounds were transferred elsewhere.

On January 26, 2014, the former St. Edmund's congregation was relaunched and renamed Holy Cross Anglican Church. On May 21, 2019, the diocese of Holy Cross came under the sole jurisdiction of the Anglican Church in North America and changed its name to the Anglican Diocese of the Living Word.

== Building ==
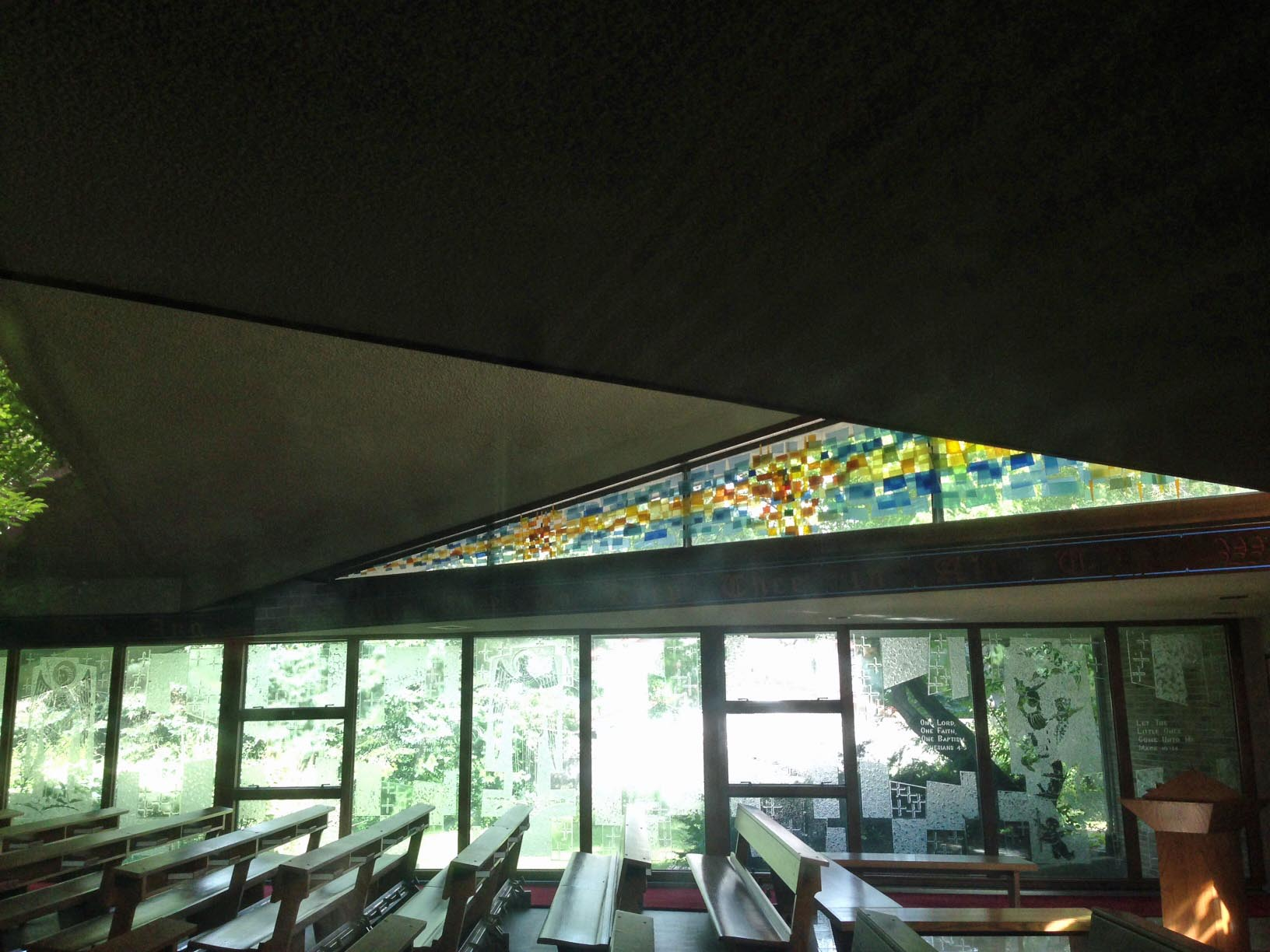
The original clear windows were designed to display the gardens outside as a work of God. They were later replaced with etched windows featuring Bible proverbs and images. Colorful abstract windows by Karl Giehl.

For more than 50 years, St. Edmund's was housed in a red clapboard and concrete church in the Mid-century Modern style.

Designed by architect William P. Wenzler and completed in 1957, the building on Watertown Plank Road in Elm Grove included one of the first hyperbolic paraboloid roofs in the United States. The roof was made of poured concrete and extended 45 feet beyond the altar, which was lit through natural light.

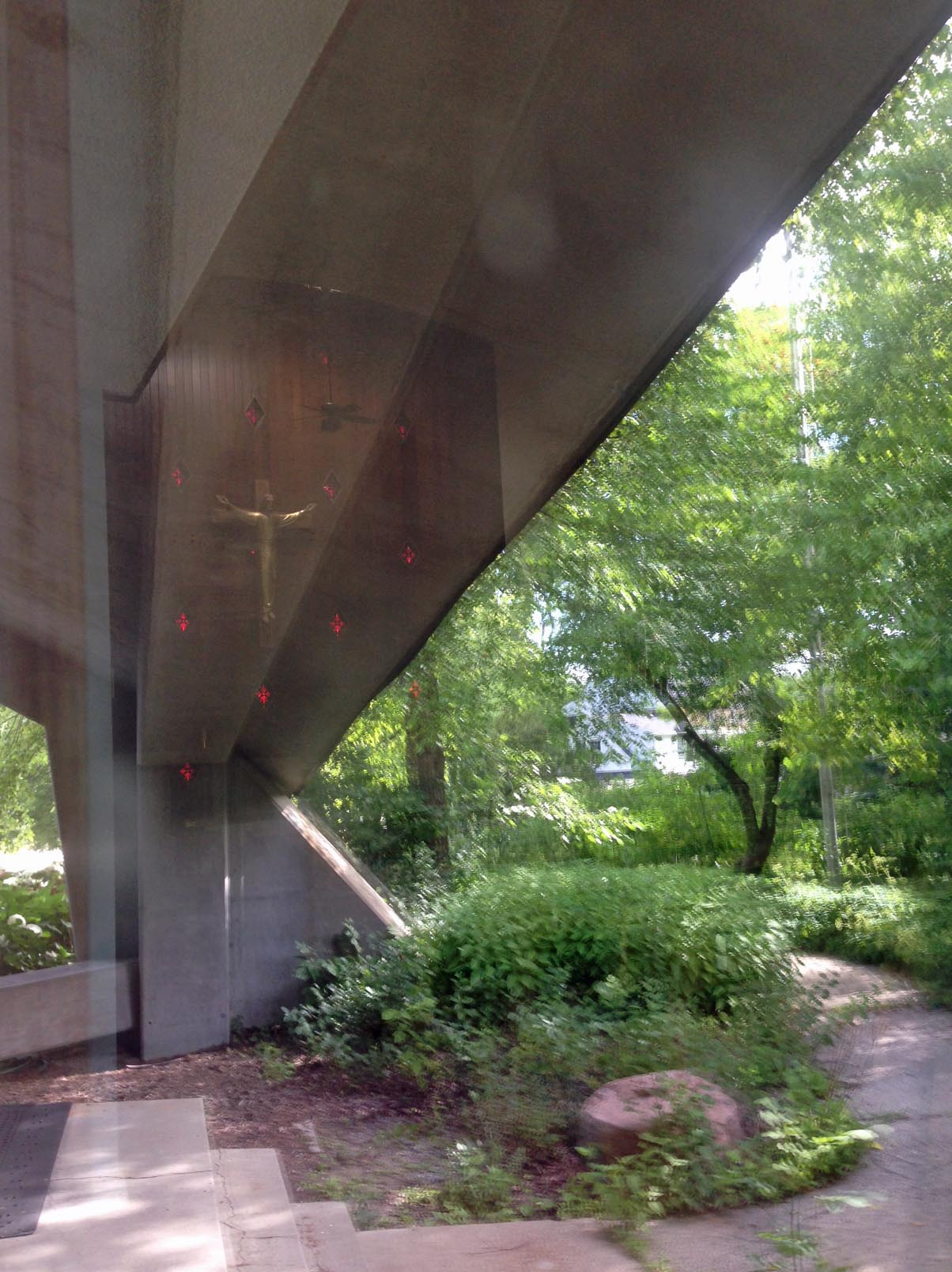
The original altar was lit by natural light filtered through the diamond windows on the front of the building. Cross in image is the replacement of the original abstract cross.

According to Wenzler's daughter, the architect was nervous about whether or not the roof would stand, particularly after he received a comment on the blueprints from Spanish modernist architect Felix Candela, who was famous for his work with concrete. Candela wrote, "I won’t say it will fall, but if it stands it will be a coincidence." Wenzler's daughter writes that workmen on the building site were also terrified the roof would collapse, since its flexible shape meant it moved whenever someone walked on it.

Once finished, the building was well received by the architecture press and religious leaders of the time. Speaking shortly after the completion of the building, Wenzler said that new churches should not be "a shadow of the past, but an expression of the future."

The building had a distinctive crucifix by Karl Giehl (1921-1966), a Milwaukee-based modernist artist-craftsman who specialized in altars, pulpits, baptismal fonts, chalices, and other interior church decoration, and who worked with Wenzler on more than one project. Giehl was a Catholic who worked primarily with Protestant congregations, whom he found more receptive to his use of primitive symbols in modern form.

The bronze Giehl crucifix, an abstract rendition in which Christ's hands are sheaves of grain, was removed during a 1990s renovation and replaced with a more figurative crucifix. It now stands in an outdoor chapel at St. Bartholomew's in Pewaukee, Wisconsin.

The original Giehl crucifix from St. Edmund's in Elm Grove, Wisconsin now stands in the outdoor chapel at St. Bartholomew's in Pewaukee, Wisconsin

Giehl also designed the building's colorful abstract windows.

After the final St. Edmunds Congregation left in 2012, the building remained empty until it was sold in 2015 to a newly formed Christian congregation, the Crimson Way church. The new owners painted the clapboard exterior of the church's apse white.

As of August 2025, the building was occupied by Auxano Church. Auxano attached a large unfinished wooden cross to the exterior of the apse. The interior altar area is now painted flat white and grey, decorated with an additional large unfinished wooden cross.

== Declaration of St. Edmund's Church ==
The Declaration of St. Edmund's Church is an important document in the history of Anglicanism in the American Midwest as St. Edmund's was the first parish in Wisconsin to leave the Episcopal Church while remaining in the Anglican Communion.

== See also ==
- Anglican Communion Network
- Anglo-Catholicism
- Mid-century modern Architecture
