= Dover =

Town and port in Kent, England

Coordinates: 51.1295°N 1.3089°E

- Town
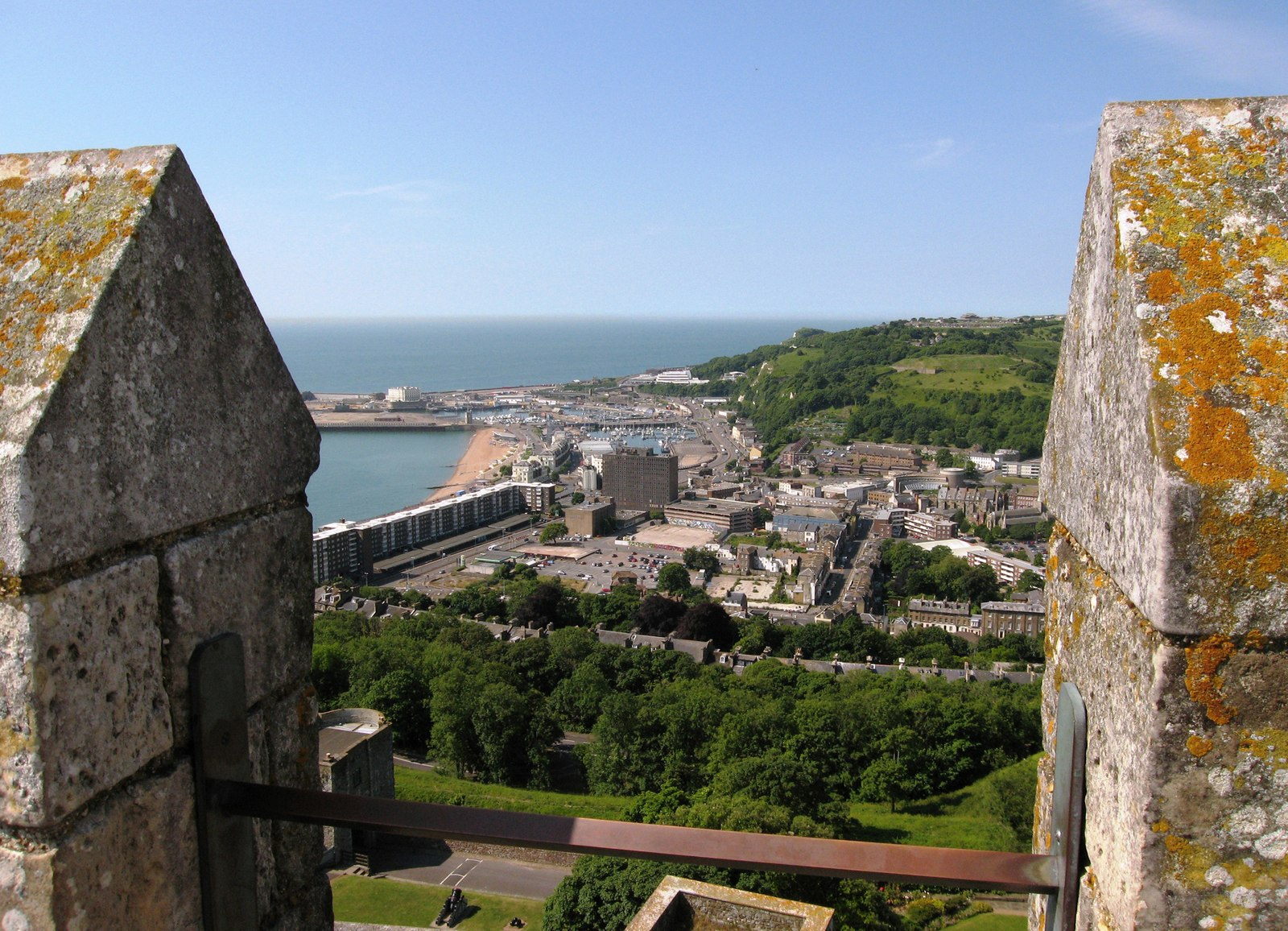
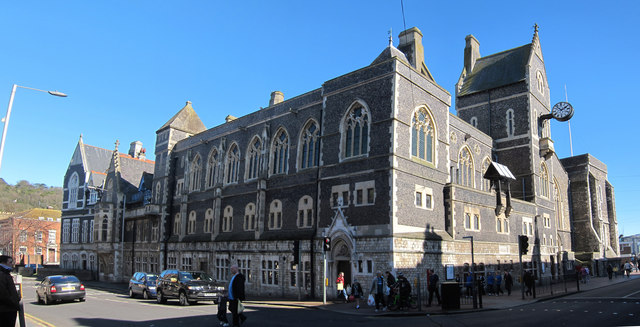
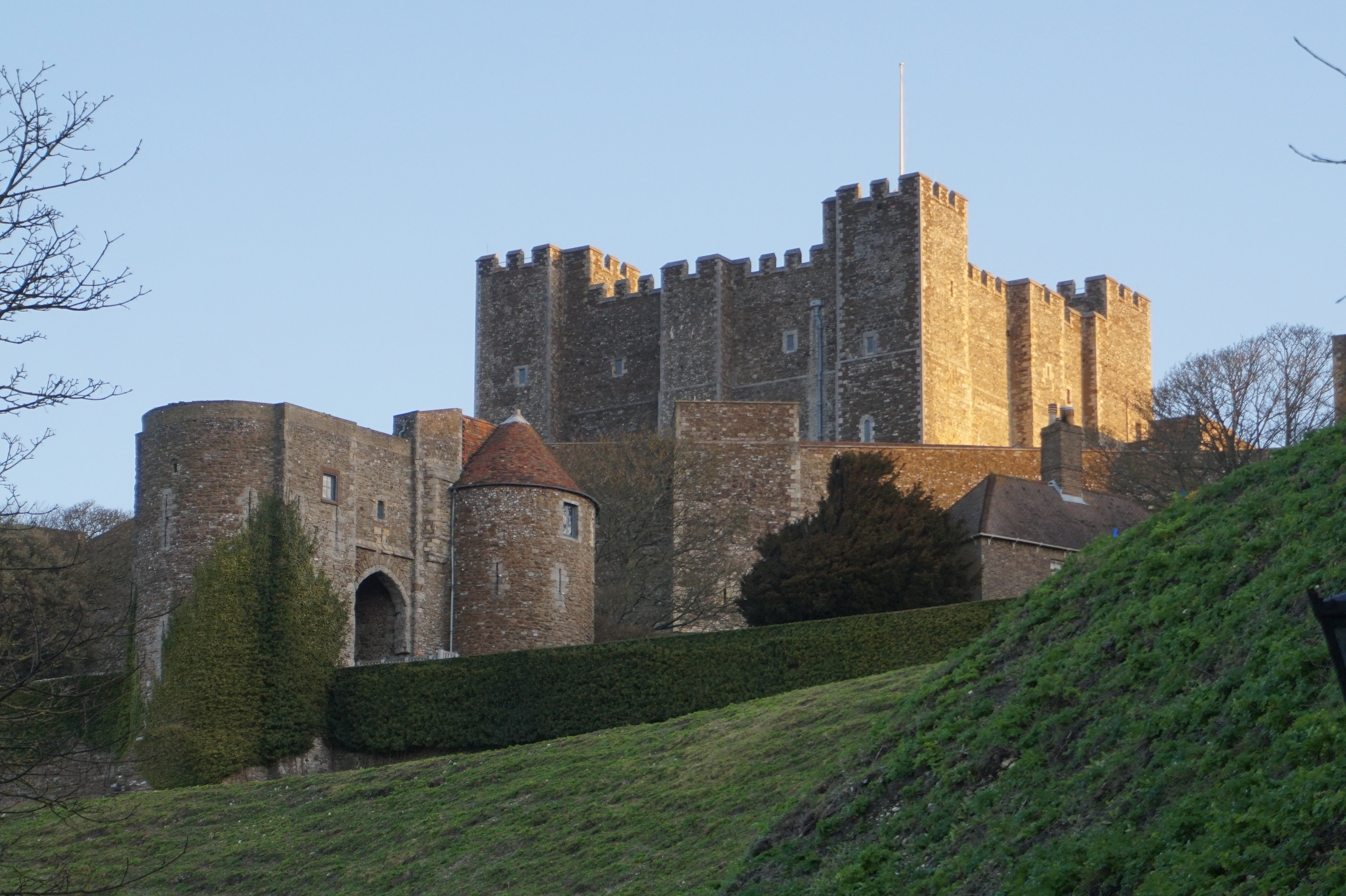
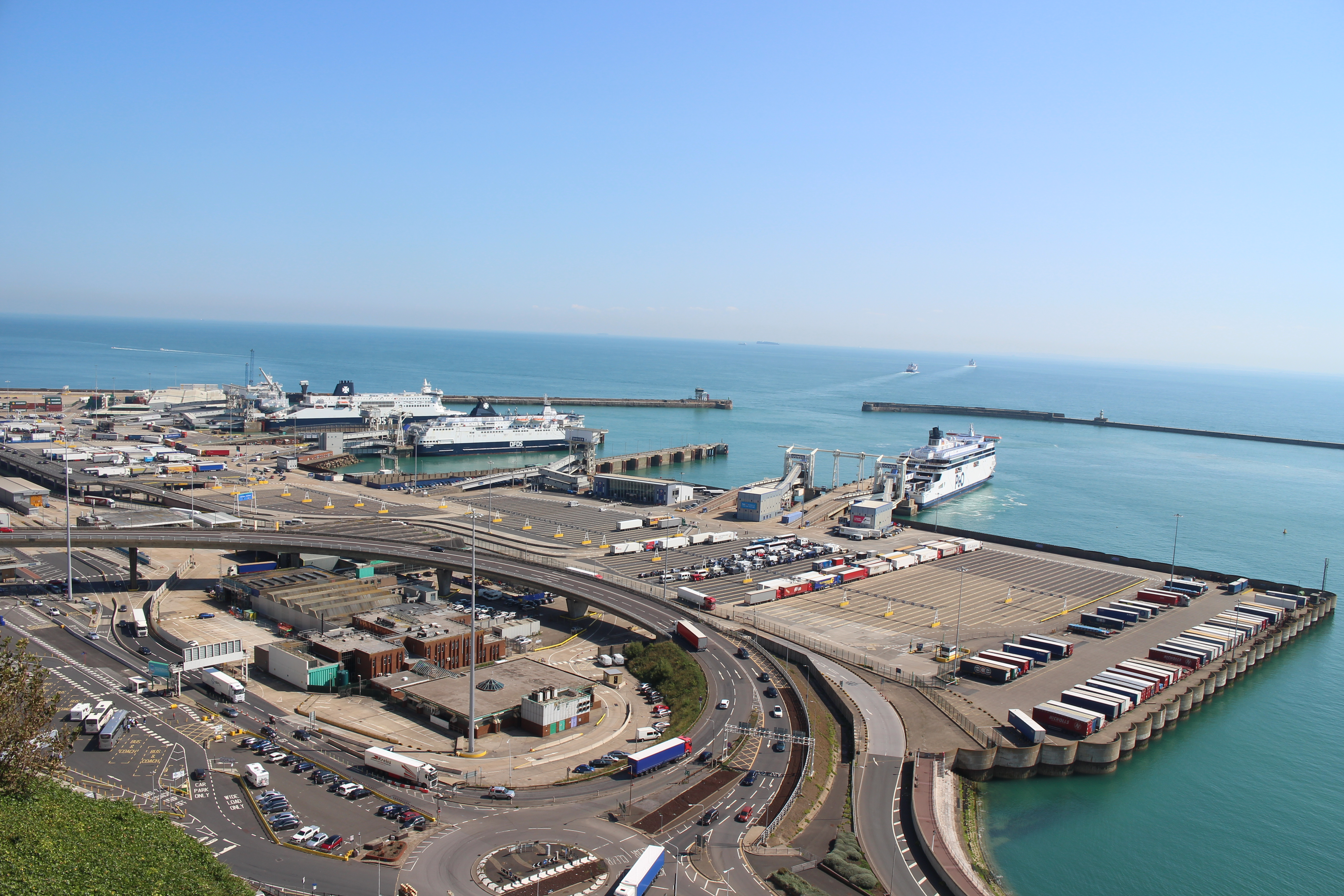
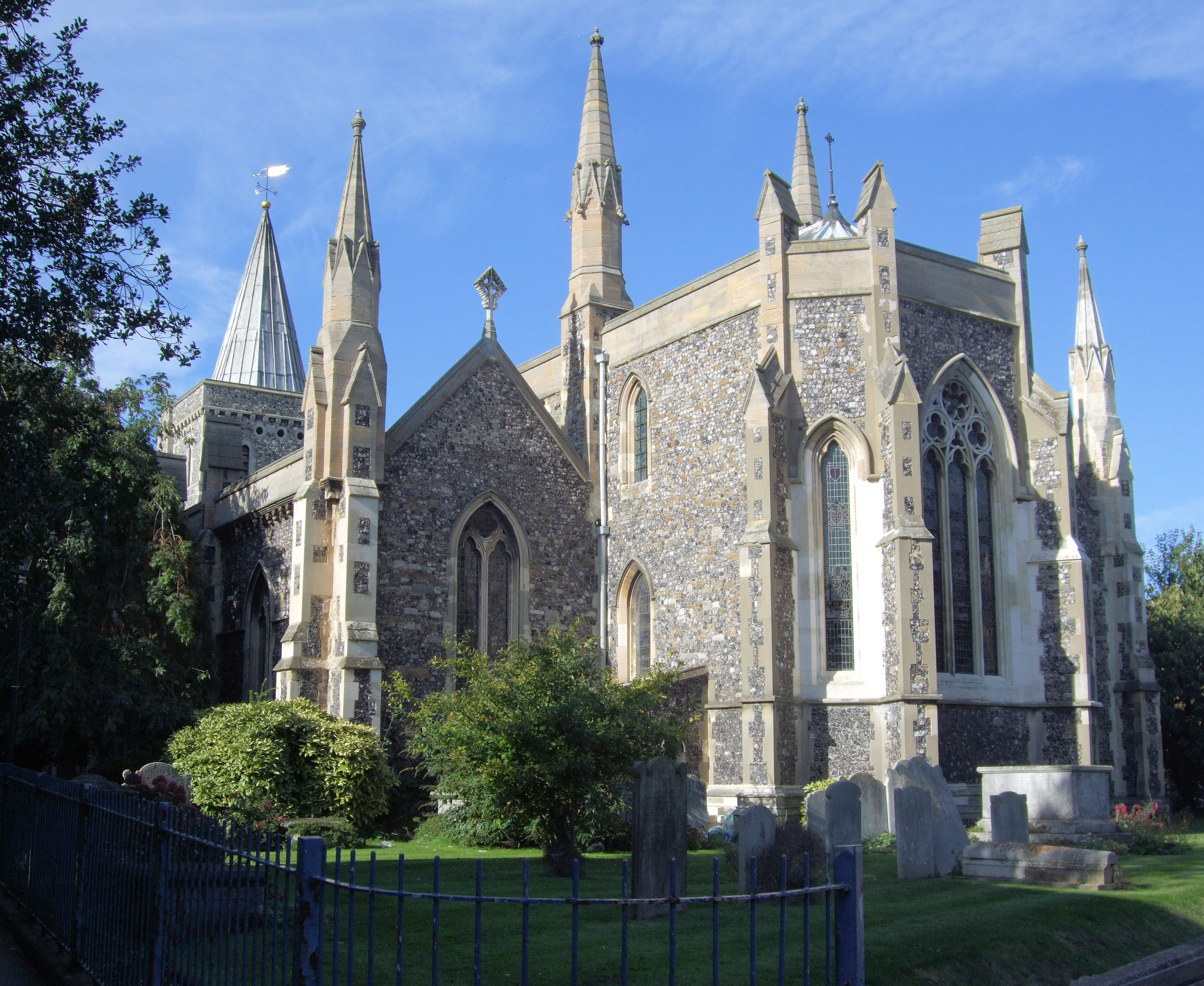
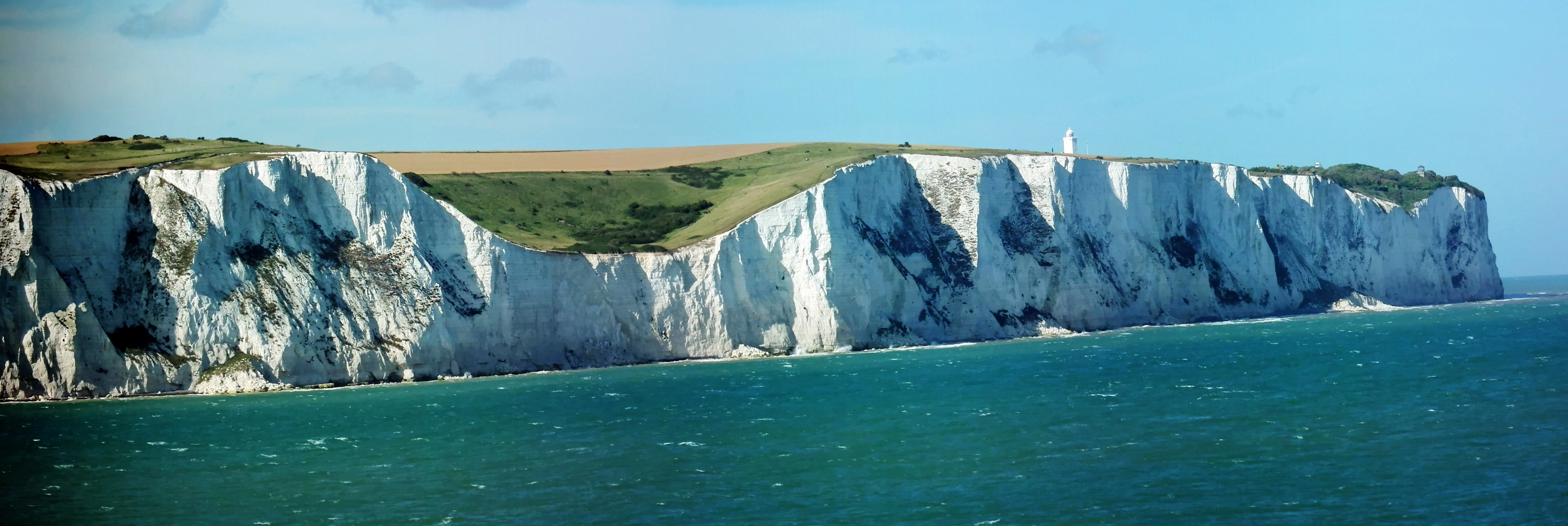
- A view over Dover from the castle The Town Hall The Castle The Port St Mary's The White Cliffs of Dover

- Location within Kent
- Interactive map of Dover
- Population: 44,209 (2024)
- OS grid reference: TR315415
  - London: 77.8 miles (125.2 km)
- Civil parish: Dover
- District: Dover
- Shire county: Kent
- Region: South East
- Country: England
- Sovereign state: United Kingdom
- Post town: DOVER
- Postcode district: CT16, CT17
- Dialling code: 01304
- Police: Kent
- Fire: Kent
- Ambulance: South East Coast
- UK Parliament: Dover and Deal
- Councillors: Mayor (Edward Biggs)

Dover (/ˈdoʊvər/ DOH-vər) is a town, major ferry port and civil parish in Kent, England. It faces France across the Strait of Dover, the narrowest part of the English Channel at 33 kilometres (21 mi) from Cap Gris-Nez in France. It lies southeast of Canterbury and east of Maidstone. The town is the administrative centre of the Dover District and home of the Port of Dover. In 2024 it had an estimated population of 44,209.

Archaeological finds have revealed that the area has always been a focus for peoples entering and leaving Britain. The name derives from the River Dour that flows through it.

In recent times the town has undergone transformations, with a high-speed rail link to London, new retail in town with St James' area opened in 2018, and a revamped promenade and beachfront. This followed in 2019, with a new 500 m pier to the west of the harbour, and new marina unveiled as part of a £330 million investment in the area. It has also been a point of destination for many illegal migrant crossings.

The Port of Dover provides much of the town's employment, as does tourism, including to the landmark White Cliffs of Dover. There were 368,000 tourists visiting Dover castle in 2019. Dover is classified as a Large-Port Town, due to its large volumes of port traffic and low urban population.

== History ==
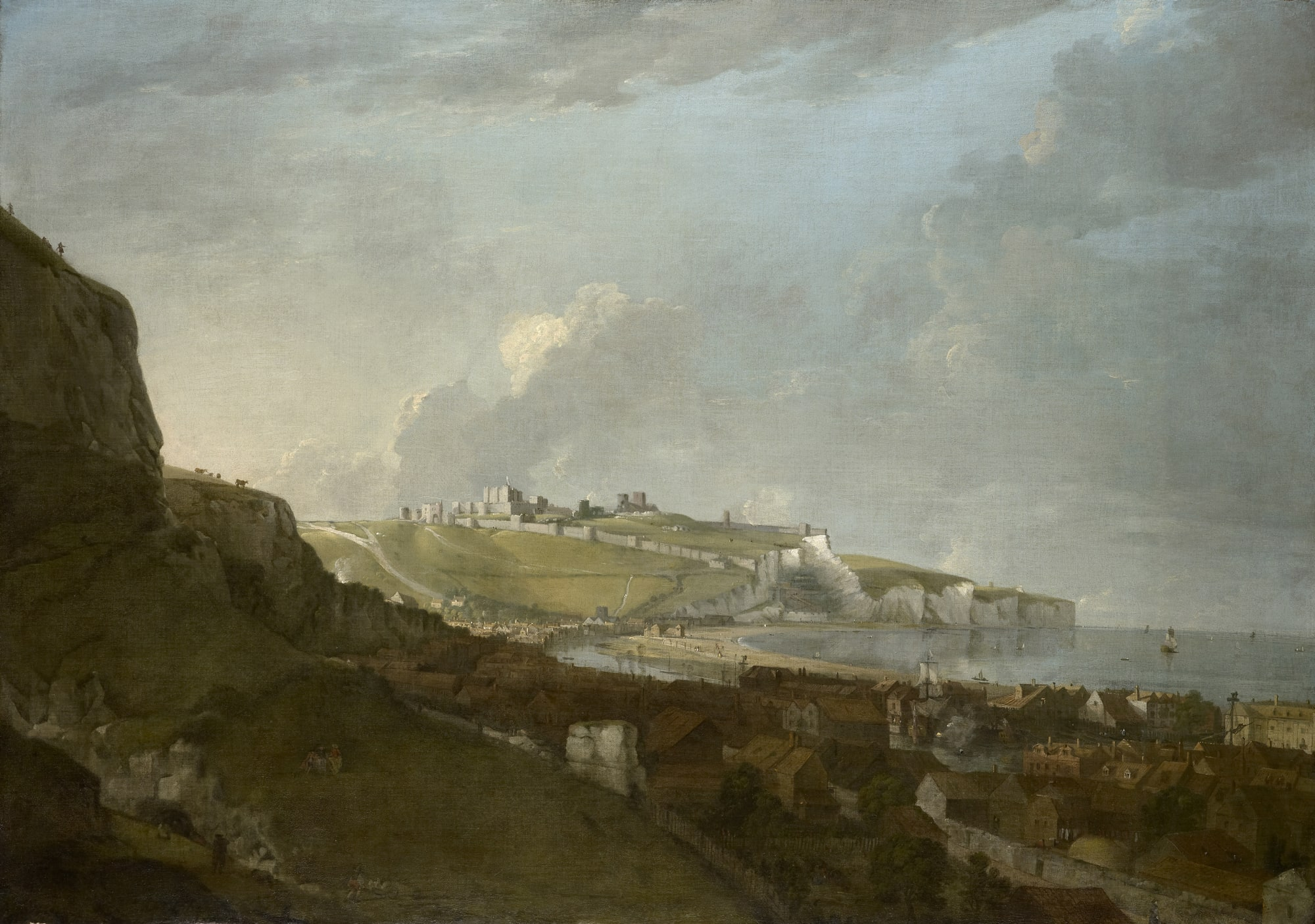
View of Dover, by Richard Wilson, 1746-47

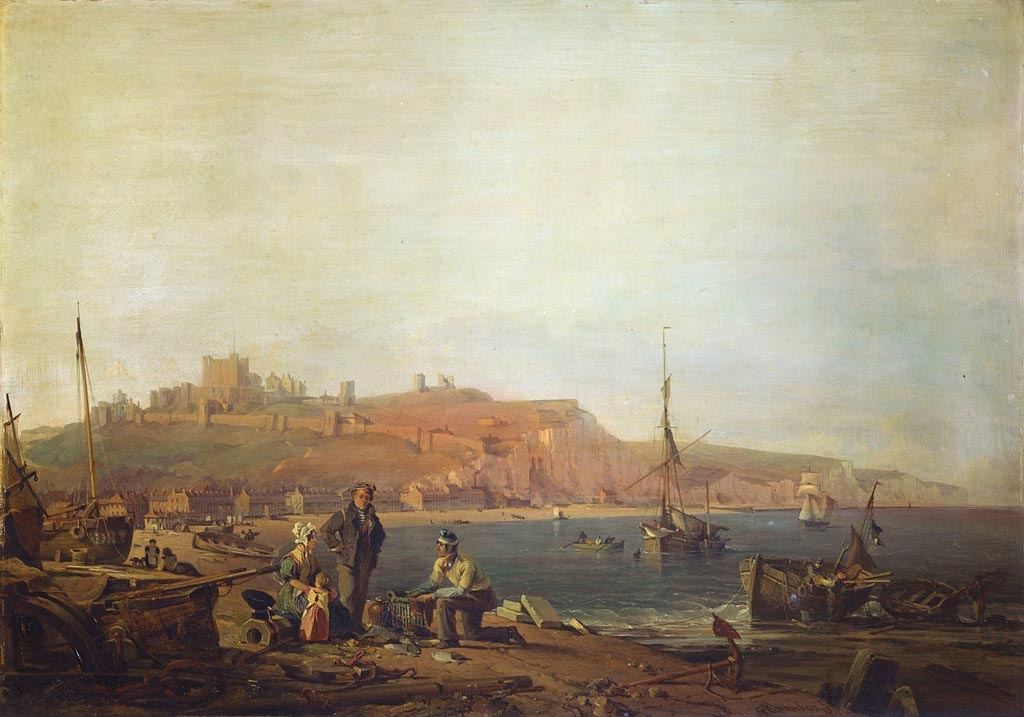
View of Dover, by George Chambers, 1832

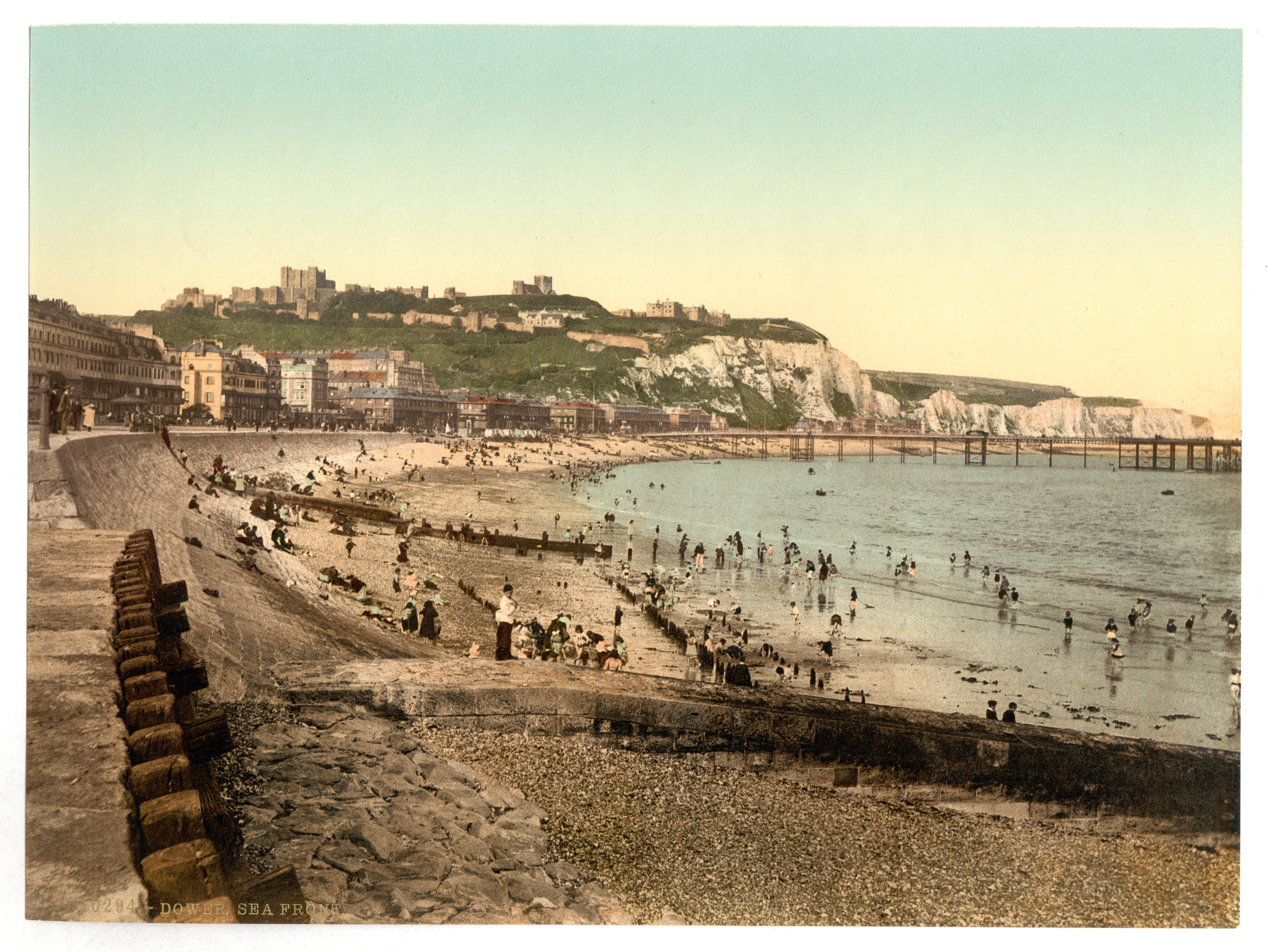
Photochrom showing Dover Harbour Beach, c. 1900

Archaeological finds have shown that there were Stone Age people in the area, and that some Iron Age finds also exist. During the Roman period, the area became part of the Roman communications network. It was connected by road to Canterbury and Watling Street and it became Portus Dubris, a fortified port. Dover has a partly preserved Roman lighthouse (the tallest surviving Roman structure in Britain) and the remains of a villa with preserved Roman wall paintings. Dover later figured in the Domesday Book (1086).

Forts were built above the port and lighthouses were constructed to guide passing ships. It is one of the Cinque Ports. and has served as a bastion against various attackers: notably the French during the Napoleonic Wars and Germany during the Second World War.

During the Cold War, a regional seat of government was located within the White Cliffs beneath Dover Castle. This is omitted from the strategic objects appearing on the Soviet 1:10,000 city plan of Dover that was produced in 1974. The port would have served as an embarkation point for sending reinforcements to the British Army of the Rhine in the event of a Soviet ground invasion of Europe.

In 1974, a discovery was made at Langdon Bay off the coast near Dover. It contained bronze axes of French design and is probably the remainder of the cargo of a sunken ship. At the same time, this find also shows that trade routes across the Channel between England and France existed already in the Bronze Age, or even earlier. In 1992, the so-called Dover boat from the Bronze Age was discovered in six metres depth underwater. This is one of the oldest finds of a seaworthy boat. Using the radiocarbon method of investigation, the boat's construction was dated to approximately 1550 BC.

=== Etymology ===
First recorded in its Latinised form of Portus Dubris, the name derives from the Brythonic word for water (dwfr in Middle Welsh, dŵr in Modern Welsh apart from 'dwfrliw' (Watercolour) which has retained the old Welsh spelling, dour in Breton). The same element is present in the town's French name Douvres and the name of the river, Dour, which is also evident in other English towns such as Wendover. However, the modern Modern Welsh name Dofr is an adaptation of the English name Dover.

The current name was in use at least by the time of Shakespeare's King Lear (between 1603 and 1606), in which the town and its cliffs play a prominent role.

=== The Siege of Dover (1216) ===
Louis VIII of France landed his army, seeking to depose King Henry III, on Dover's mainland beach. Henry III ambushed Louis' army with approximately 400 bowmen atop The White Cliffs of Dover and his cavalry attacking the invaders on the beach. However, the French slaughtered the English cavalry and made their way up the cliffs to disperse the bowmen. Louis' army seized Dover village, forcing the English back to Canterbury. French control of Dover lasted for three months after which English troops pushed back, forcing the French to surrender and return home.

== Geography and climate ==
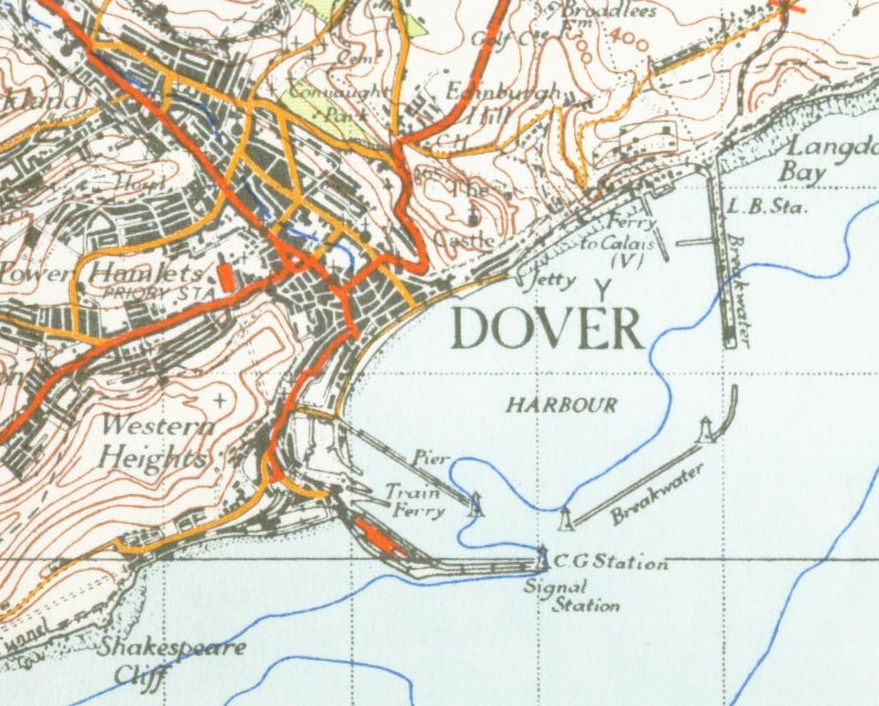
1945 Ordnance Survey map of Dover, showing the harbour

Dover is in the south-east corner of Britain. From South Foreland, the nearest point to the European mainland, Cap Gris Nez is 34 kilometres (21 mi) away across the Strait of Dover.

The site of its original settlement lies in the valley of the River Dour, sheltering from the prevailing south-westerly winds. This has led to the silting up of the river mouth by the action of longshore drift. The town has been forced into making artificial breakwaters to keep the port in being. These breakwaters have been extended and adapted so that the port lies almost entirely on reclaimed land.

The higher land on either side of the valley – the Western Heights and the eastern high point on which Dover Castle stands – has been adapted to perform the function of protection against invaders. The town has gradually extended up the river valley, encompassing several villages in doing so. Little growth is possible along the coast, since the cliffs are on the sea's edge. The railway, being tunnelled and embanked, skirts the foot of the cliffs.

Dover has an oceanic climate (Köppen classification Cfb) similar to the rest of the United Kingdom with mild temperatures year-round and a light amount of rainfall each month. The warmest recorded temperature was 37.4 °C (99.3 °F), recorded at Langdon Bay on 25 July 2019, While the lowest recorded temperature was −9.5 °C (14.9 °F), recorded at Dover RMS on 31 January 1972. The temperature is usually between 3.6 °C (38.5 °F) and 21.1 °C (70.0 °F).

Climate data for Dover, elevation: 0 m (0 ft), 1991–2020 normals, extremes 1918–present (Note: Extreme temperature were recorded at Dover (1918–1961), Dover RMS (1959–1979), Dover No. 2 (2000–2002) and Langdon Bay (1989–present))
Month	Jan	Feb	Mar	Apr	May	Jun	Jul	Aug	Sep	Oct	Nov	Dec	Year
Record high °C (°F)	14.5 (58.1)	16.6 (61.9)	20.6 (69.1)	25.0 (77.0)	26.4 (79.5)	30.8 (87.4)	37.4 (99.3)	33.0 (91.4)	28.0 (82.4)	24.1 (75.4)	17.8 (64.0)	15.0 (59.0)	37.4 (99.3)
Mean daily maximum °C (°F)	8.1 (46.6)	8.3 (46.9)	10.6 (51.1)	12.6 (54.7)	16.0 (60.8)	18.5 (65.3)	20.9 (69.6)	21.1 (70.0)	19.0 (66.2)	15.7 (60.3)	11.8 (53.2)	8.9 (48.0)	14.3 (57.7)
Daily mean °C (°F)	5.9 (42.6)	6.0 (42.8)	7.7 (45.9)	9.7 (49.5)	12.7 (54.9)	15.4 (59.7)	17.6 (63.7)	17.9 (64.2)	16.0 (60.8)	12.9 (55.2)	9.3 (48.7)	6.6 (43.9)	11.5 (52.7)
Mean daily minimum °C (°F)	3.6 (38.5)	3.6 (38.5)	4.7 (40.5)	6.8 (44.2)	9.5 (49.1)	12.4 (54.3)	14.4 (57.9)	14.8 (58.6)	12.9 (55.2)	10.0 (50.0)	6.7 (44.1)	4.3 (39.7)	8.7 (47.7)
Record low °C (°F)	−9.5 (14.9)	−8.4 (16.9)	−7.2 (19.0)	−3.4 (25.9)	−0.1 (31.8)	2.2 (36.0)	5.0 (41.0)	7.2 (45.0)	1.7 (35.1)	−1.1 (30.0)	−3.9 (25.0)	−6.1 (21.0)	−9.5 (14.9)
Average precipitation mm (inches)	79.1 (3.11)	64.7 (2.55)	45.9 (1.81)	56.6 (2.23)	49.3 (1.94)	55.1 (2.17)	52.5 (2.07)	63.7 (2.51)	64.3 (2.53)	98.7 (3.89)	107.6 (4.24)	95.0 (3.74)	832.4 (32.77)
Average precipitation days (≥ 1.0 mm)	12.3	10.6	10.6	10.5	8.1	8.2	8.2	8.0	10.2	11.6	12.6	12.7	123.5
Mean monthly sunshine hours	64.9	82.9	125.0	192.1	214.6	221.8	224.2	223.7	164.5	124.2	72.5	59.2	1,769.7
Source 1: Met Office (precipitation days 1981-2010)
Source 2: Starlings Roost Weather

== Demography ==
In 1800, the year before Britain's first national census, Edward Hasted (1732–1812) reported that the town had a population of almost 10,000 people.

At the 2001 census, the town of Dover had 28,156 inhabitants, while the population of the whole urban area of Dover, as calculated by the Office for National Statistics, was 39,078 inhabitants.

With the expansion of Dover, many of the outlying ancient villages have been incorporated into the town. Originally the parishes of Dover St. Mary's and Dover St. James, since 1836 Buckland and Charlton have become part Dover, and Maxton (a hamlet to the west), River, Kearsney, Temple Ewell, and Whitfield, all to the north of the town centre, are within its conurbation.

== Economy ==
=== Retail ===
The town's main shopping streets are the High Street, Biggin Street, Market Square, Cannon Street, Pencester Road and Castle Street. The Castleton Retail Park is to the north-west of the town centre. The new St James' Retail and Leisure Park opened in 2018 and is a southern extension of the town centre; it consists of shops, restaurants, a Travelodge Hotel and a Cineworld Cinema.

=== Shipping ===
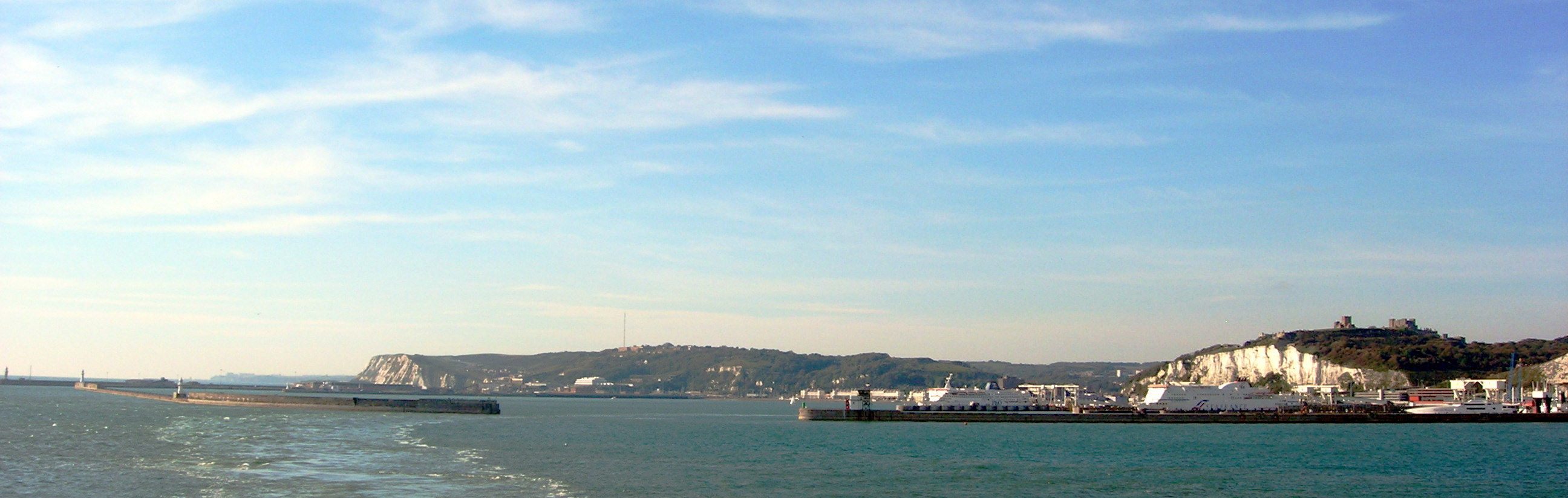
The Port of Dover and the White Cliffs of Dover

The Dover Harbour Board is the responsible authority for the running of the Port of Dover. The English Channel, here at its narrowest point in the Straits of Dover, is the busiest shipping lane in the world. Ferries crossing between here and the Continent have to negotiate their way through the constant stream of shipping crossing their path. The Dover Strait Traffic Separation Scheme allots ships separate lanes when passing through the Strait. The Scheme is controlled by the Channel Navigation Information Service based at Maritime Rescue Co-ordination Centre Dover. MRCC Dover is also charged with co-ordination of civil maritime search and rescue within these waters.

The Port of Dover is also used by cruise ships. The old Dover Marine railway station building houses one passenger terminal, together with a car park. A second, purpose-built, terminal is located further out along the pier.

The ferry lines using the port are (number of daily sailings in parentheses):

- to Calais: P&O Ferries (13), DFDS Seaways (14), Irish Ferries (14).
- to Dunkirk: DFDS Seaways (11).

These services have been cut in recent years:

- P&O Ferries sailings to Boulogne (5 daily) were withdrawn in 1993 and Zeebrugge (4 daily) in 2002.
- SNCF withdrew their three train ferry sailings on the opening of the Channel Tunnel.
- Regie voor Maritiem Transport moved their Ostend service of three sailings daily to Ramsgate in 1994; this route was operated by TransEuropa Ferries until April 2013.
- Stena Line merged their 20 Calais sailings into the current P&O operation in 1998.
- Hoverspeed ceased operations in 2005 and withdrew their 8 daily sailings.
- SpeedFerries ceased operations in 2008 and withdrew their 5 daily sailings.
- LD Lines ceased the Dover-Dieppe service on 29 June 2009 and Dover-Boulogne 5 September 2010.
- SeaFrance ceased operations in 2012 of their Dover-Calais service which was their only service.

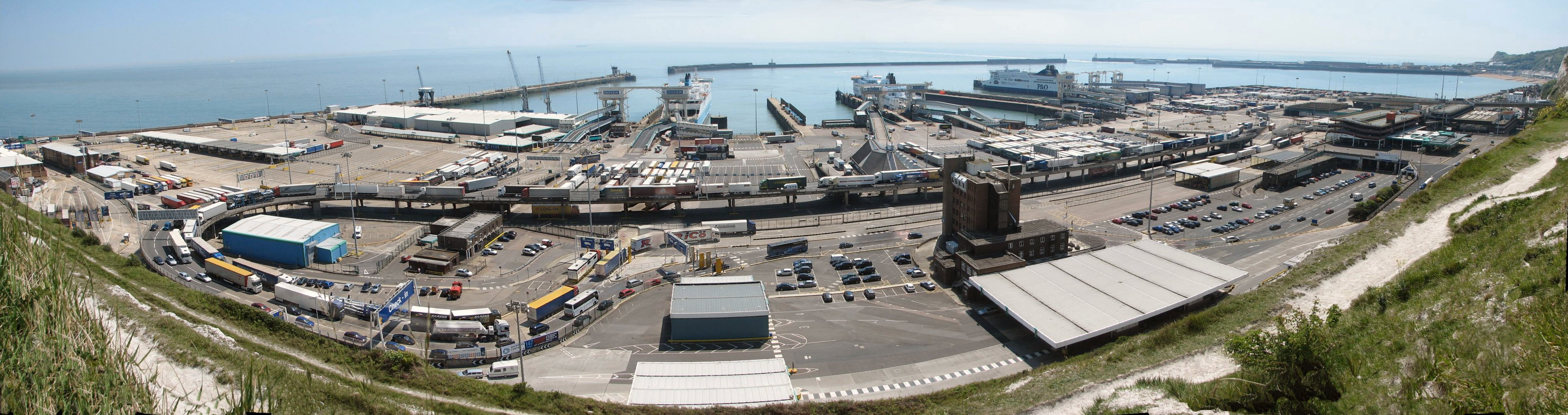
Dover Harbour, from the White Cliffs of Dover

== Main sights ==
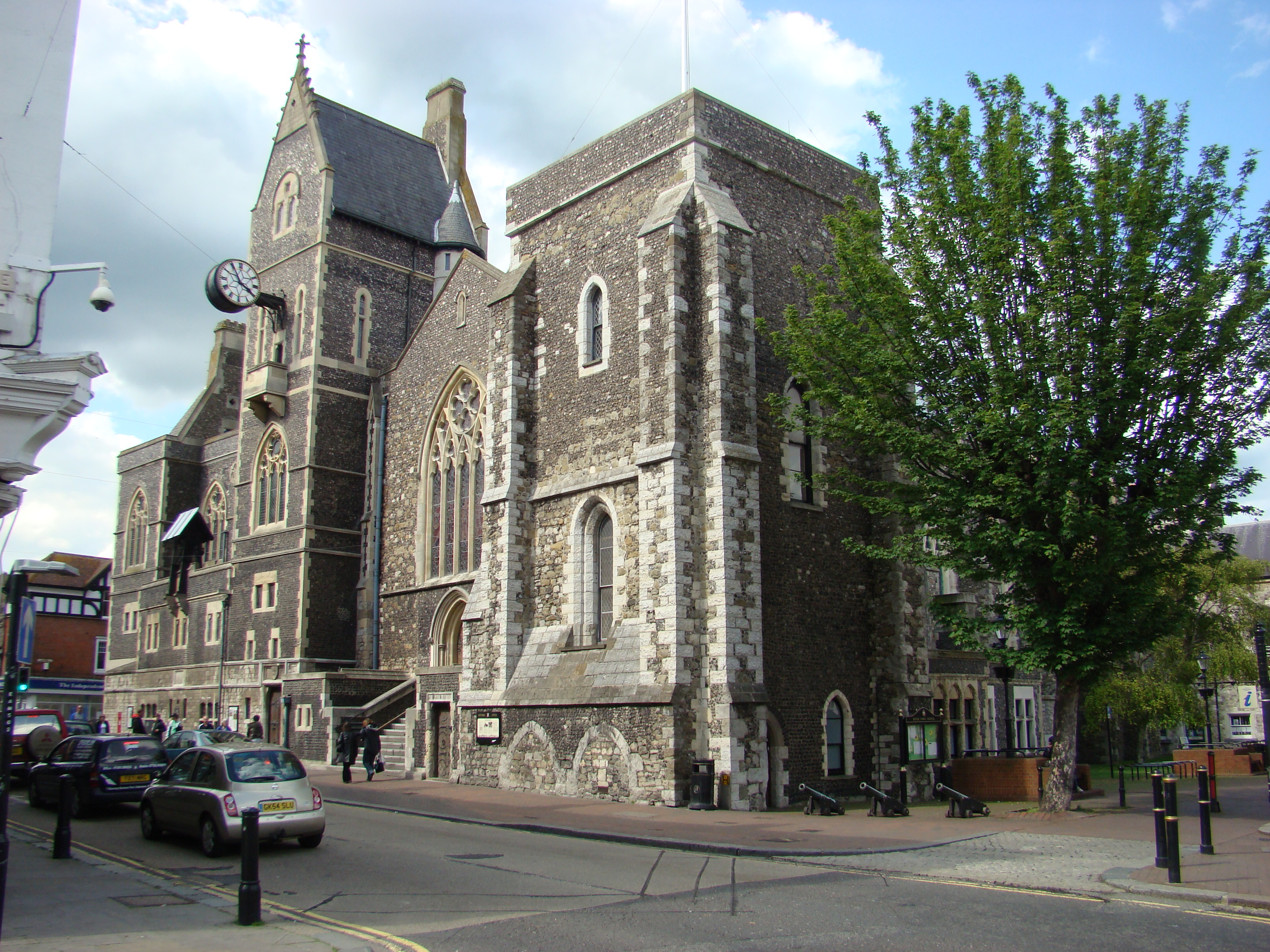
The Town Hall, which dates back to 1203

- Blériot memorial: the outline of Louis Blériot's aircraft, marked with granite setts, at the exact spot where Blériot landed after the first cross-Channel flight, 1909
- Dover Castle
- White Cliffs of Dover
- Dover Western Heights
- Dover Museum
- Dover Marina
- Dover Pier
- Roman Painted House Museum
- Maison Dieu, Dover
- Samphire Hoe
- South Foreland Lighthouse
- Pines Garden
- St Edmund's Chapel
- St Mary's Church
- St James' Church: preserved as a "tidy ruin"
- St Paul's Church

Dover Castle	White Cliffs of Dover	Pines Garden	Samphire Hoe Country Park
The castle from the north	White Cliffs seen from the Strait of Dover	The Pines Garden	Samphire Hoe beneath the White Cliffs of Dover

== Transport ==
=== Road ===
Dover's main communications artery, the A2 road replicates two former routes, connecting the town with Canterbury. The Roman road was followed for centuries until, in the late 18th century, it became a toll road. Stagecoaches were operating: one description stated that the journey took all day to reach London, from 4 am to being "in time for supper".

The other main roads, travelling west and east, are the A20 to Folkestone and thence the M20 to London, and the A258 through Deal to Sandwich.

In December 2020, a long line of freight trucks formed due to sudden border closures with France, because of new strains of COVID-19 within the United Kingdom.

=== Rail ===
The railway reached Dover from two directions: the South Eastern Railway's main line connected with Folkestone in 1844, and the London, Chatham & Dover Railway opened its line from Canterbury in 1861. Southeastern trains run from Dover Priory to London Charing Cross, London Victoria or London St Pancras International stations in London, and Ramsgate or Sandwich in Kent. With the introduction of the high-speed service into St Pancras International via High Speed 1, rail journey times between London and Dover were reduced to 55 minutes non-stop.

The Chatham Main Line into Priory was electrified under British Railways in 1959 as part of Stage 1 of Kent Coast Electrification, under the BR 1955 Modernisation Plan. The line up to Ramsgate, via Deal, was subsequently electrified under stage two of Kent Coast electrification in January 1961. The line from Folkestone into Priory was electrified in June 1961.

A tram system operated in the town from 1897 to 1936.

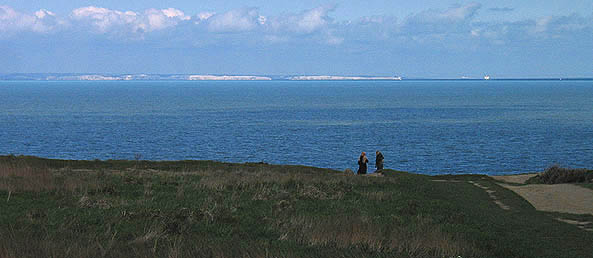
View of the White Cliffs of Dover from France

=== Walking ===
Dover has two long distance footpaths: the Saxon Shore Way and the North Downs Way. The National Trust White Cliffs can be reached by foot from the town centre, with pathways to South Foreland Lighthouse, and St Margarets Bay along the cliff top . The walking routes from Dover pass the National Trust visitor centre on the landmark chalk cliffs overlooking the English Channel with views of France visible on a clear day.

=== Cycling ===
Two National Cycle Network routes begin their journey at the town. Route one goes from Dover to Canterbury. This route links with National Cycle Route 2 from Dover to St Austell, Regional route 16, and Regional route 17 in Dover. It passes three castles. Firstly from Dover on the steap incline past Dover Castle. ThenSouth Foreland Lighthouse is visible from the route. Mostly traffic-free along the east coast from Kingsdown to Deal, passing Walmer Castle and Deal Castle. Follows toll road (free to cyclists) through the Royal Cinque Ports Golf Club to the town of Sandwich. In Sandwich the route links with Regional route 15. Dover town centre is cycle friendly: There are dedicated cycle lanes along the seafront and cycle routes through the town's pedestrianised High Street area.

=== Ferry ===
The Port of Dover is a 20-minute walk from Dover Priory railway station. The port offers crossings to both Calais (DFDS, P&O and Irish Ferries) and Dunkirk (DFDS). The Dover to Dunkirk ferry route was originally operated by ferry operator Norfolkline. This company was later acquired by the pan European operator DFDS Seaways in July 2010. The crossing time is approximately two hours. The location of Dunkirk is also more convenient for those travelling by road transport on to countries in Northern Europe including Belgium, the Netherlands, Germany and further afield.

=== Bus ===
Stagecoach South East operate local bus services. Dover is on the Stagecoach Diamond network providing links to Canterbury and Deal. The Western Docks at the port of Dover are served from the town centre as well as Canterbury and Deal. Dover is the start of The Wave network to New Romney via Folkestone, Hythe and Dymchurch. There are services to Lydd via Lydd Airport, and links to Sandwich.

National Express runs coaches from Dover to other towns in Kent including Canterbury, Folkestone, Ashford, Kent, Maidstone, Gillingham at Hempsted Valley shopping centre and Greenhithe at Bluewater Shopping Centre for Dartford to London including Bexleyheath, Eltham, Walworth, Canary Wharf, Elephant & Castle, the City of London and to Victoria Coach Station.

== RNLI ==
The Dover lifeboat is a Severn class lifeboat based in the Western Docks. Dover Lifeboat station is based at crosswall quay in Dover Harbour. There is a Severn-class lifeboat, which is the biggest in the fleet. It belongs to the RNLI which covers all of Great Britain. The lifeboat number is 17–09 and has a lot of emergencies in the Channel. The Severn class is designed to lay afloat. Built from fibre reinforced composite (FRC) the boat is lightweight yet very strong and is designed to right itself in the event of a capsize.

== Education ==
There are seven secondary level schools serving Dover.

Public schools

- Dover College

Dover College is a mixed public school founded in 1871 by a group of local business men.

Selective secondary schools

There are two single-sex grammar schools and a mixed military school in Dover.

- Dover Grammar School for Boys (DGSB)
- Dover Grammar School for Girls (DGGS)

Both grammar schools require the Dover Test or the Kent Test for admission to Year 7.

- Duke of York's Royal Military School

Duke of York's Royal Military School is a selective secondary school with academy status and England's only military boarding school for children of service personnel (co-education ages 11–18), located next to the former site of Connaught Barracks.

Non-selective secondary schools

There are 3 ex-secondary modern mixed schools in Dover, all with academy status.

- Astor Secondary School

Astor Secondary School federated with St Radigunds Primary School (then renamed White Cliffs Primary College for the Arts) to form the Dover Federation for the Arts (DFA). Subsequently, Barton Junior School and Shatterlocks Nursery and Infant School joined the DFA. In 2014, the DFA was warned by the Department for Education about "unacceptably low standards of performance of pupils ".

- St Edmund's Catholic School

St Edmund's Catholic School federated with St Richards Catholic Primary School to form the Dover Federation of Catholic Schools.

- Dover Christ Church Academy

Dover Christ Church Academy is located in Whitfield, 4 miles north of Dover.

Technical College

Dover Technical College is part of the East Kent College (EKC) group.

In addition, 16 primary schools and two special schools add to the educational offering.

== Public services ==
Dover has one hospital, Buckland Hospital. Earlier hospitals included the Royal Victoria Hospital, the Isolation Hospital and the Eye Hospital.

== Local media ==
=== Television ===
Local news and television programmes are provided by BBC South East and ITV Meridian. Television signals are received from the nearby Dover TV transmitter situated south of the town and a local relay transmitter in the centre of Dover.

Dover was the home to television studios and production offices of Southern Television Ltd, the company which operated the ITV franchise for South and South East England from 1958 to 1981. The studios were located on Russell Street and were home to programmes like 'Scene South East', 'Scene Midweek', 'Southern News', 'Farm Progress' and the nightly epilogue, 'Guideline'. The studios were operated by TVS in 1982 and home to 'Coast to Coast', however they closed a year later when the company moved their operations to the newly complete Television Centre in Maidstone.

=== Newspapers ===
Dover has two paid for newspapers, the Dover Express (published by Kent Regional News and Media) and the Dover Mercury (published by the KM Group). Free newspapers for the town previously included the Dover and Deal Extra, part of the KM Group; and yourdover, part of KOS Media.

=== Radio ===
Dover has one local commercial radio station, KMFM Shepway and White Cliffs Country, broadcasting to Dover on 106.8FM. The station was founded in Dover as Neptune Radio in September 1997 but moved to Folkestone in 2003 and was consequently rebranded after a takeover by the KM Group. Dover is also served by the county-wide stations Heart South, Gold and BBC Radio Kent.

The Gateway Hospital Broadcasting Service, in Buckland Hospital radio, closed at the end of 2006. It was the oldest hospital radio station in East Kent being founded in 1968.

DCR 104.9FM (Dover Community Radio) started broadcasting on 104.9FM in May 2022 and is Dover and White Cliffs Country's community radio station. The online station of the same name launched on 30 July 2011 offering local programmes, music and news for Dover and district. Prior to this DCR was an online podcasting service since 2010. . Dover Community Radio was awarded a community radio licence by OFCOM on 12 May 2020.

As of November 2021, BFBS Gurkha Radio has been broadcasting on 90.8FM in Dover and can be picked up within 1 mile of its transmission site at the Dover Community Centre located at Burgoyne Heights. This is part of a trial broadcast of small scale FM services by OFCOM due to end in September 2022 but it maybe extended to serve the Gurkha community living at Burgoyne Heights.

== Culture ==
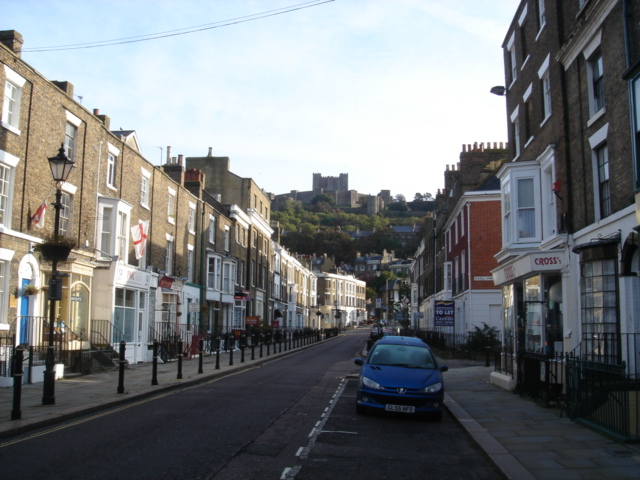
Dover Castle seen from Castle Street.

There are three museums: the main Dover Museum, the Dover Transport Museum and the Roman Painted House. The town has two cinemas, the Silver Screen Cinema located at the Dover Museum and the Cineworld Cinema opened in 2018 as part of the St James' Retail and Leisure complex. A former cinema King's Hall, dating from 1911 and now a bingo club, is in Biggin Street.

The Discovery Centre located off the Market Square houses Dover's library, Dover Museum, Silver Screen Cinema, the Roundhouse Community Theatre as well as adult education facilities. The Charlton Shopping Centre off the High Street has retail units, the Dover Local community hub, leisure facilities and the studios of Dover Community Radio.

The White Cliffs Theatre opened in 2001 is based at Astor College. There is also a community theatre based at St Edmund's Catholic School

== Twin towns ==
Dover is twinned with:

- Calais, France
- Huber Heights, Ohio, United States
- Split, Croatia
- Dover, Christ Church, Barbados

== Sports ==
Dover District Leisure Centre operated by Places Leisure located in Whitfield opened in March 2019 replacing the previous facility on Townwall Street, which was operated by Your Leisure, a not for profit charitable trust, which caters for sports and includes a swimming pool.

There are sports clubs, among them Dover Athletic F.C., who play in the National League South; rugby; swimming; water polo and netball (Dover and District Netball League).

Dover Rowing Club is the oldest coastal rowing club in Britain and has a rich history, at one time becoming the best club on the south coast. More information can be found on the history page of the club's website.

One event which gets media attention is that of swimming the English Channel.

Sea fishing, from the beach, pier or out at sea, is carried out here. The so-called Dover sole (solea solea) is found all over European waters.

Dover is now the host of a variety of watersports; such as paddle-boarding and kayaking.

== In literature ==
- M.R. James located part of his 1911 ghost story "Casting the Runes", from More Ghost Stories of an Antiquary, in the town's Lord Warden Hotel
- Felicia Dorothea Hemans wrote her poem The Cliffs of Dover. published in Forget Me Not, 1827 in a patriotic vein.
- Lydia Huntley Sigourney's poem Dover., published in her volume 'Pleasant Memories of Pleasant Lands', records her thoughts following her visit during her tour of 1840.
- Matthew Arnold used the setting of Dover in his 19th-century poem, Dover Beach.
- Dover features several times in A Tale of Two Cities by Charles Dickens.
- Russell Hoban repurposed Dover as "Do It Over" in his 1980, post apocalyptic novel Riddley Walker. Wye became "How"; Canterbury, "Cambry", and Ashford, "Bernt Arse".

== In song ==
- "(There'll Be Bluebirds Over) The White Cliffs of Dover" by Vera Lynn, recorded in 1942.
- "Cliffs of Dover" is an instrumental rock composition by the American guitarist, singer and songwriter Eric Johnson, released on his 1990 studio album Ah Via Musicom.
- "Clover Over Dover" by British band Blur is track 12 on their 1994 album Parklife.
- "Calais to Dover" by American band Bright Eyes is track 13 on their 2020 album Down in the Weeds, Where the World Once Was.
- "Dover Beach" by Baby Queen is on her 2021 album The Yearbook. She wrote the song following a visit to Dover, taking inspiration from Matthew Arnold's poem of the same name. Queen filmed an accompanying music video at Samphire Hoe.

== See also ==
- Strait of Dover
- Listed buildings in Dover
