= St. Edmund's College =

St. Edmund's College may refer to:

- St Edmund's College, Cambridge, a constituent college of the University of Cambridge
- St Edmund's College, Salisbury, England, a collegiate church and later St Edmund's Church, Salisbury
- St Edmund's College, Ware, a public school in Hertfordshire, England
- St. Edmund's College, Liverpool, a former Church of England School in Liverpool, England
- St Edmund's College, Canberra, a Catholic school in Australia
- St. Edmund's College, Shillong, a Catholic school in Meghalaya, India
- St Edmund's College, Ipswich, a school in Ipswich, Queensland

== See also ==
- St Edmund Hall, Oxford, a constituent college of the University of Oxford
- St Edmund's School (disambiguation)
