= Dover Grammar School for Girls =

Coordinates: 51°8′1″N 1°18′26″E

Location
- Frith Road; Dover, Kent, CT16 2PZ; England

Information
- Type: Community grammar school
- Motto: Optima tenete (Hold on to the best things in life)
- Established: 1904 as Dover County School (with Dover Grammar School for Boys), and 1910 as Dover Girls Grammar School
- Local authority: Kent
- Department for Education URN: 118806 Tables
- Head teacher: Daniel Quinn
- Staff: 59 (2017/18)
- Gender: Female (11-16); Mixed (16-18)
- Age: 11 to 18
- Enrollment: 881 (2017/18)
- Capacity: 885 (2017/18)
- Houses: Stephen de Pencester, Queen Ethelburga, St Martin, Hubert de Burgh
- Website: http://www.dggs.kent.sch.uk

Dover Grammar School for Girls is a community grammar school for girls, aged between 11 and 16, and a joint sixth-form with boys between the age of 16 and 18, in Dover, England.

== School History ==
The school can trace back its origins to 1904 when the County School for Boys and Girls formed as a result of the amalgamation of the Dover Pupil Teacher Centre (founded in 1894) and The Municipal Secondary School (founded in 1890).

In 1910, the County School split into 2 separate entities, Dover County School for Boys and Dover County School for Girls and, after housed in several buildings in Dover (Effingham Crescent, Godwyne Road and Maison Dieu Road), the school moved to the Boy's premises in Frith Road in 1934 who relocated to Astor Avenue.

The school's houses are Hubert de Burgh 1st Earl of Kent, St Martin, Queen Ethelburga, and Stephen de Pencester with the names chosen in a poll by the students and have never changed.

During World War II, pupils and staff of the school were evacuated to Caerleon Training College in Wales, part of the University of South Wales.

=== Post-War Developments ===
In 1990, following a new government formula-funding scheme, proposals were made to move Dover Grammar School for Boys and the Girls' school to the former vacated Castlemount School site but this was abandoned following opposition from staff, parents and the general public.

In 1991, education chiefs considered moving the 2 grammar schools to a single site in Whitfield. Instead, it was agreed to create a joint 6th form with DGSB.

In 2007, as part of the Specialist schools programme, the grammar school was allowed to concentrate in the humanities.

In 2008, plans were drawn to relocate the 2 Dover grammar schools to one site in Whitfield, led by the Kent County Council under the Building Schools for the Future programme but this was cancelled in 2010.

In 2018, the governors approved the building of a new Science block on the site of the music mobile. New state of the art Science facilities will be ready in 2019 and include four large laboratories, a small staff room and a Prep room.

== Admissions ==
The school is selective and participates in order to gain entry the prospective student must first pass the 11+ examination, informally known as the "Kent Test" or the Dover Test, children able to take both.

=== Headteachers ===
- Ms Jesse Chapman, (1910–1926)
- Ms Helen Scott, (1926–1928)
- Ms Edith May Gruer MA (Aberdeen), (1928–1951)
- Ms Marian Sergeant MA (Oxon), (1951–1965)
- Ms Lillian V Kay BA (London), PGCE (Cantab), (1965–1977)
- Ms Joan R Hasler MA (Oxon), (1977–1986)
- Ms Elizabeth J Davis, (1986–1992)
- Dr Roger Thurling BSc, PhD (Kent), (1992–1994)
- Ms Elizabeth Lewis, (1994–1999)
- Mrs Julia Bell BA (UEA), PGCE (London), (1999–2004)
- Mrs Judith Carlisle BA (Bristol), (2004–2010)
- Mr Matthew Bartlett MA (Cantab), (2010–2016)
- Mr Robert Benson BSc (Exeter), PGCE, MA (CCCU), (2016 - 2024)

- Mr Daniel Quinn (2024 - )

=== Notable alumnae ===
- Ruth and May Bell, twin fashion models
