= List of acts of the 3rd session of the 12th Parliament of Great Britain =

This is a complete list of acts of the 3rd session of the 12th Parliament of the United Kingdom which had regnal year 4 Geo. 3. This session met from 15 November 1763 until 19 April 1764.

For acts passed until 1707, see the list of acts of the Parliament of England and the list of acts of the Parliament of Scotland. See also the list of acts of the Parliament of Ireland.

For acts passed from 1801 onwards, see the list of acts of the Parliament of the United Kingdom. For acts of the devolved parliaments and assemblies in the United Kingdom, see the list of acts of the Scottish Parliament, the list of acts of the Northern Ireland Assembly, and the list of acts and measures of Senedd Cymru; see also the list of acts of the Parliament of Northern Ireland.

The number shown after each act's title is its chapter number. Acts are cited using this number, preceded by the year(s) of the reign during which the relevant parliamentary session was held; thus the Union with Ireland Act 1800 is cited as "39 & 40 Geo. 3. c. 67", meaning the 67th act passed during the session that started in the 39th year of the reign of George III and which finished in the 40th year of that reign. Note that the modern convention is to use Arabic numerals in citations (thus "41 Geo. 3" rather than "41 Geo. III"). Acts of the last session of the Parliament of Great Britain and the first session of the Parliament of the United Kingdom are both cited as "41 Geo. 3".

Acts passed by the Parliament of Great Britain did not have a short title; however, some of these acts have subsequently been given a short title by acts of the Parliament of the United Kingdom (such as the Short Titles Act 1896).

Before the Acts of Parliament (Commencement) Act 1793 came into force on 8 April 1793, acts passed by the Parliament of Great Britain were deemed to have come into effect on the first day of the session in which they were passed. Because of this, the years given in the list below may in fact be the year before a particular act was passed.

== 1763 ==
The third session of the 12th Parliament of Great Britain, which met from 15 November 1763 until 19 April 1764.

This session was also traditionally cited as 4 G. 3.

=== Public acts ===
Short title	Citation	Royal assent
Long title
Malt Duties etc. Act 1763 (repealed)	4 Geo. 3. c. 1	19 December 1763
An Act for continuing, and granting to His Majesty, certain Duties upon Malt, (Note: Malt tax.) Mum, Cyder, and Perry, for the Service of the Year One Thousand Seven Hundred and Sixty-four. (Repealed by Statute Law Revision Act 1867 (30 & 31 Vict. c. 59))
Land Tax Act 1763 (repealed)	4 Geo. 3. c. 2	19 December 1763
An Act for granting an Aid to His Majesty, by a Land Tax, to be raised in Great Britain, for the Service of the Year One Thousand Seven Hundred and Sixty-four. (Repealed by Statute Law Revision Act 1867 (30 & 31 Vict. c. 59))
Mutiny Act 1763 (repealed)	4 Geo. 3. c. 3	25 January 1764
An Act for punishing Mutiny and Desertion; and for the better Payment of the Army and their Quarters. (Repealed by Statute Law Revision Act 1867 (30 & 31 Vict. c. 59))
Naturalisation Act 1763 (repealed)	4 Geo. 3. c. 4	25 January 1764
An Act for exhibiting a Bill in this present Parliament, for naturalizing his Highness the Hereditary Prince of Brunswick Lunenburg. (Repealed by Statute Law Revision Act 1867 (30 & 31 Vict. c. 59))
Royal Family Act 1763 (repealed)	4 Geo. 3. c. 5	21 March 1764
An Act for naturalizing his Highness Charles William Ferdinand, Hereditary Prince of Brunswick Lunenburg. (Repealed by Statute Law Revision Act 1948 (11 & 12 Geo. 6. c. 62))
Importation Act 1763 (repealed)	4 Geo. 3. c. 6	21 March 1764
An Act to continue, for a limited Time, the free Importation of Tallow, Hogs Lard, and Grease, from Ireland. (Repealed by Statute Law Revision Act 1867 (30 & 31 Vict. c. 59))
Cider and Perry Act 1763 (repealed)	4 Geo. 3. c. 7	21 March 1764
An Act to explain and amend such Part of an Act made in the last Session of Parliament (intituled, "An Act for granting to His Majesty several additional Duties upon Wines imported into this Kingdom; and certain Duties upon all Cyder and Perry; and for raising the Sum of Three Millions Five Hundred Thousand Pounds, by Way of Annuities and Lotteries, to be charged on the said Duties") (Note: National Debt (No. 2) Act 1762 (3 Geo. 3. c. 12)) as relates to Cyder and Perry made in this Kingdom. (Repealed by Duties on Cider, etc. Act 1766 (6 Geo. 3. c. 14))
Marine Mutiny Act 1763 (repealed)	4 Geo. 3. c. 8	21 March 1764
An Act for the Regulation of His Majesty's Marine Forces while on Shore. (Repealed by Statute Law Revision Act 1867 (30 & 31 Vict. c. 59))
Customs Act 1763 (repealed)	4 Geo. 3. c. 9	5 April 1764
An Act for repealing the Duties now payable upon Beaver Skins imported, and for granting other Duties in Lieu thereof; and for granting certain Duties upon the Exportation of Beaver Skins and Beaver Wool; and for taking off the Drawback allowed on the Exportation of such Skins. (Repealed by Statute Law Revision Act 1867 (30 & 31 Vict. c. 59))
Recognizances (Discharge) Act 1764 (repealed)	4 Geo. 3. c. 10	5 April 1764
An Act for the more easy Discharge of Recognizances estreated into His Majesty's Court of Exchequer. (Repealed by Statute Law Revision Act 1948 (11 & 12 Geo. 6. c. 62))
Continuance of Laws Act 1763 (repealed)	4 Geo. 3. c. 11	5 April 1764
An Act for continuing certain Laws therein mentioned, relating to British Sail-cloth, and to the Duties payable on Foreign Sail-cloth, and to the Allowance upon the Exportation of British made Gunpowder; and for giving further Encouragement for the Importation of Naval Stores from the British Colonies in America. (Repealed by Statute Law Revision Act 1867 (30 & 31 Vict. c. 59))
Continuance of Laws (No. 2) Act 1763 (repealed)	4 Geo. 3. c. 12	5 April 1764
An Act to continue several Laws, for the better regulating of Pilots for the conducting of Ships and Vessels from Dover, Deal, and Isle of Thanet, up the Rivers of Thames and Medway; relating to the landing of Rum or Spirits of the British Sugar Plantations before the Duties of Excise are paid thereon; and to the further Punishment of Persons going armed or disguised, in Defiance of the Laws of Customs or Excise; and to the Relief of the Officers of the Customs in Informations upon Seizures; and for granting a Liberty to carry Sugars, of the Growth, Produce, or Manufacture, of any of His Majesty's Sugar Colonies, directly into Foreign Parts, in Ships built in Great Britain, and navigated according to Law; and for punishing Persons who shall damage or destroy any Banks, Flood-gates, Sluices, or other Works, belonging to Rivers and Streams made navigable by Act of Parliament. (Repealed for England and Wales by Criminal Statutes Repeal Act 1827 (7 & 8 Geo. 4. c. 27) and for India by Criminal Law (India) Act 1828 (9 Geo. 4. c. 74))
Supply, etc. Act 1763 (repealed)	4 Geo. 3. c. 13	5 April 1764
An Act for granting to His Majesty a certain Sum of Money, out of the Sinking Fund, for the Service of the Year One Thousand Seven Hundred and Sixty-four; (Note: A loan of £2 million.) and for preventing, in certain Cases, the obtaining of Allowances in respect of the Leakage of Wines imported into this Kingdom; and for making forth Duplicates of Exchequer Bills, Tickets, Certificates, Receipts, Annuity Orders, and other Orders, lost, burnt, or otherwise destroyed. (Repealed by Statute Law Revision Act 1867 (30 & 31 Vict. c. 59))
Regulation of Buildings Act 1763 or the Building Act 1764 (repealed)	4 Geo. 3. c. 14	5 April 1764
An Act for the better regulating of Buildings; and to prevent Mischiefs that may happen by Fire, within the Weekly Bills of Mortality, and other Places therein mentioned. (Repealed by Statute Law Revision Act 1867 (30 & 31 Vict. c. 59))
Sugar Act 1763 or the Sugar Act 1764 or the American Revenue Act 1764 or the American Duties Act 1764 (repealed)	4 Geo. 3. c. 15	5 April 1764
An Act for granting certain Duties in the British Colonies and Plantations in America; for continuing, amending, and making perpetual, an Act passed in the Sixth Year of the Reign of His late Majesty King George the Second (intituled, "An Act for the better securing and encouraging the Trade of His Majesty's Sugar Colonies in America"); (Note: Trade of Sugar Colonies Act 1732 (6 Geo. 2. c. 13)) for applying the Produce of such Duties, and of the Duties to arise by virtue of the said Act, towards defraying the Expenses of defending, protecting, and securing, the said Colonies and Plantations; for explaining an Act made in the Twenty-fifth Year of the Reign of King Charles the Second, (intituled, "An Act for the Encouragement of the Greenland and Eastland Trades; and for the better securing the Plantation Trade"); (Note: Trade Act 1672 (25 Cha. 2. c. 7)) and for altering and disallowing several Drawbacks on Exports from this Kingdom, and more effectually preventing the clandestine Conveyance of Goods to and from the said Colonies and Plantations, and improving and securing the Trade between the same and Great Britain. (Repealed by Statute Law Revision Act 1867 (30 & 31 Vict. c. 59))
Infant Trustees and Mortgages Act 1763 (repealed)	4 Geo. 3. c. 16	5 April 1764
An Act to enable Infants, who are seised of Lands, Tenements, or Hereditaments, within the Dutchy of Lancaster, or the Counties Palatine of Chester, Lancaster, or Durham, or the Principality of Wales, in Fee, or for the Life or Lives of One or more other Person or Persons, in Trust, or by Way of Mortgage, to make Conveyances of such Estates, by Order of the Court of the Dutchy Chamber of Lancaster, of the Court of Exchequer of the County Palatine of Chester, the Court of Chancery of the County Palatine of Lancaster, of the Court of Chancery of the County Palatine of Durham, and of the Courts of the Great Sessions in the Principality of Wales. (Repealed by Infants, Lunatics, etc. Act 1825 (6 Geo. 4. c. 74))
Militia Act 1763 (repealed)	4 Geo. 3. c. 17	19 April 1764
An Act to explain and amend an Act, passed in the Second Year of the Reign of His present Majesty, intituled, "An Act to explain, amend, and reduce into One Act of Parliament, the several Laws now in being, relating to the raising and training the Militia within that Part of Great Britain called England." (Note: Militia Act 1762 (2 Geo. 3. c. 20)) (Repealed by Statute Law Revision Act 1867 (30 & 31 Vict. c. 59))
National Debt Act 1763 (repealed)	4 Geo. 3. c. 18	19 April 1764
An Act for charging on the Sinking Fund certain Annuities, granted by an Act passed in the First Year of the Reign of His present Majesty, (Note: National Debt Act 1760 (1 Geo. 3. c. 7)) and for carrying the Duties therein mentioned to the said Fund; and also for consolidating such of the said Annuities as are granted for a certain Term of Years irredeemable, with other Annuities granted by an Act passed in the Second Year of His present Majesty's Reign. (Note: National Debt (No. 2) Act 1761 (2 Geo. 3. c. 10)) (Repealed by Statute Law Revision Act 1870 (33 & 34 Vict. c. 69))
Importation into Quebec Act 1763 (repealed)	4 Geo. 3. c. 19	19 April 1764
An Act for importing Salt from Europe, into the Province of Quebec in America, for a limited Time. (Note: Salt to Quebec.) (Repealed by Customs Law Repeal Act 1825 (6 Geo. 4. c. 105))
Fort of Senegal Act 1763 (repealed)	4 Geo. 3. c. 20	19 April 1764
An Act for vesting the Fort of Senegal and its Dependencies in the Company of Merchants trading to Africa. (Repealed by Statute Law Revision Act 1867 (30 & 31 Vict. c. 59))
Affidavits in County of Durham Act 1763 (repealed)	4 Geo. 3. c. 21	19 April 1764
An Act for taking and swearing Affidavits, to be made Use of in any of the Courts of the County Palatine of Durham. (Repealed by Commissioners for Oaths Act 1889 (52 & 53 Vict. c. 10))
Whale Fishery Act 1763 (repealed)	4 Geo. 3. c. 22	19 April 1764
An Act for continuing several Acts of Parliament, made for the Encouragement of the Whale Fishery carried on by His Majesty's Subjects. (Repealed by Statute Law Revision Act 1867 (30 & 31 Vict. c. 59))
Supply, etc. (No. 2) Act 1763 (repealed)	4 Geo. 3. c. 23	19 April 1764
An Act for raising a certain Sum of Money by Loans or Exchequer Bills; and for applying certain Monies remaining in the Exchequer for the Service of the Year One Thousand Seven Hundred and Sixty-four; and for Application of certain Savings of Publick Monies, and of Monies arisen by the Sale of Military Stores; and for further appropriating the Supplies granted in this Session of Parliament; and for Relief of Persons who have omitted to insert in Indentures, or other Writings, the full Sum agreed to be paid with Clerks, Apprentices, and other Servants. (Repealed by Statute Law Revision Act 1867 (30 & 31 Vict. c. 59))
Postage Act 1763 (repealed)	4 Geo. 3. c. 24	19 April 1764
An Act for preventing Frauds and Abuses in relation to the sending and receiving of Letters and Packets free from the Duty of Postage. (Repealed by Post Office (Repeal of Laws) Act 1837 (7 Will. 4. & 1 Vict. c. 32))
National Debt (No. 2) Act 1763 (repealed)	4 Geo. 3. c. 25	19 April 1764
An Act for establishing an Agreement with the Governor and Company of the Bank of England, for raising certain Sums of Money, towards the Supply for the Service of the Year One Thousand Seven Hundred and Sixty-four; and for more effectually preventing the forging Powers to transfer such Stock, or receive such Dividends or Annuities, as are therein mentioned, and the fraudulent personating the Owners thereof. (Repealed by Statute Law Revision Act 1867 (30 & 31 Vict. c. 59))
Bounty upon Importation Act 1763 (repealed)	4 Geo. 3. c. 26	19 April 1764
An Act for granting a Bounty upon the Importation of Hemp, and rough and undressed Flax, from His Majesty's Colonies in America. (Repealed by Statute Law Revision Act 1867 (30 & 31 Vict. c. 59))
Colonial Trade Act 1763 (repealed)	4 Geo. 3. c. 27	19 April 1764
An Act for granting, for a limited Time, a Liberty to carry Rice from His Majesty's Provinces of South Carolina and Georgia directly to any Part of America to the Southward of the said Provinces, subject to the like Duty as is now paid on the Exportation of Rice from the said Colonies to Places in Europe situate to the Southward of Cape Finisterre. (Repealed by Statute Law Revision Act 1867 (30 & 31 Vict. c. 59))
Importation (No. 2) Act 1763 (repealed)	4 Geo. 3. c. 28	19 April 1764
An Act to enable His Majesty, with the Advice of His Privy Council, to order the free Importation of Provisions from Ireland, during the next Recess of Parliament, under certain Restrictions and Regulations therein mentioned. (Note: Importation of salt provisions from Ireland.) (Note: Importation of provisions from America.) (Repealed by Statute Law Revision Act 1867 (30 & 31 Vict. c. 59))
Whale Fishery (No. 2) Act 1763 (repealed)	4 Geo. 3. c. 29	19 April 1764
An Act for the Encouragement of the Whale Fishery in the Gulph and River of Saint Lawrence, and on the Coasts of His Majesty's Colonies in America. (Repealed by Statute Law Revision Act 1867 (30 & 31 Vict. c. 59))
Militia Pay Act 1763 (repealed)	4 Geo. 3. c. 30	19 April 1764
An Act for applying the Money granted in this Session of Parliament, for defraying the Charge of the Pay and Cloathing of the Militia of that Part of Great Britain called England, for One Year, beginning the Twenty-fifth Day of March, One Thousand Seven Hundred and Sixty-four. (Repealed by Statute Law Revision Act 1867 (30 & 31 Vict. c. 59))
Indemnity Act 1763 (repealed)	4 Geo. 3. c. 31	19 April 1764
An Act to indemnify such Persons as have omitted to qualify themselves for Offices and Employments; and to indemnify Justices of the Peace, Deputy Lieutenants, and Officers of the Militia, or others, who have omitted to register or deliver in their Qualifications within the Time limited by Law, and for giving further Time for those Purposes; and to indemnify Members and Officers, in Cities, Corporations, and Borough Towns, whose Admissions have been omitted to be stamped according to the several Acts of Parliament now in Force for that Purpose, or, having been stamped, have been lost or mislaid; and for allowing them Time to provide Admissions duly stamped; and to prevent the Destruction of Trees and Underwoods growing in Forests and Chaces. (Repealed by Statute Law Revision Act 1887 (50 & 51 Vict. c. 59))
Court of Chancery Act 1763 (repealed)	4 Geo. 3. c. 32	19 April 1764
An Act to empower the High Court of Chancery to lay out upon proper Securities a further Sum of Money, not exceeding a Sum therein limited, out of the Common and General Cash in the Bank of England, belonging to the Suitors of the said Court; and for applying the Interest arising therefrom towards answering the Charges of the Office of the Accomptant General of the said Court. (Repealed by Courts of Justice (Salaries and Funds) Act 1869 (32 & 33 Vict. c. 91))
Bankrupts Act 1763 (repealed)	4 Geo. 3. c. 33	19 April 1764
An Act for preventing Inconveniencies arising in Cases of Merchants, and such other Persons as are within the Description of the Statutes relating to Bankrupts, being entitled to Privilege of Parliament, and becoming insolvent. (Repealed by Bankruptcy Act 1825 (6 Geo. 4. c. 16))
Paper Bills of Credit Act 1763 or the Currency Act 1764 (repealed)	4 Geo. 3. c. 34	19 April 1764
An Act to prevent Paper Bills of Credit, hereafter to be issued, within any of His Majesty's Colonies or Plantations in America, from being declared to be a legal Tender in Payments of Money; and to prevent the legal Tender of such Bills as are now subsisting from being prolonged beyond the Periods limited for calling in and sinking the same. (Repealed by Statute Law Revision Act 1867 (30 & 31 Vict. c. 59))
Hampshire, Kent, Sussex Fortifications Act 1763	4 Geo. 3. c. 35	19 April 1764
An Act for making Compensation to the Proprietors of such Lands and Hereditaments as have been purchased upon the Sea Coasts, in the Counties of Kent, Sussex, and Southampton, on which Forts and Batteries have been erected for Defence of the said Coasts, in Pursuance of an Act passed in the Second Year of the Reign of His present Majesty; (Note: Hampshire, Kent, Sussex Fortifications Act 1762 (2 Geo. 3. c. 37)) and for other Purposes therein mentioned.
Bankrupts, etc. Act 1763 (repealed)	4 Geo. 3. c. 36	19 April 1764
An Act to continue an Act made in the Fifth Year of the Reign of His late Majesty King George the Second, intituled, "An Act to prevent the committing of Frauds by Bankrupts;" (Note: Bankrupts Act 1731 (5 Geo. 2. c. 30)) and for extending the Laws relating to Hackney Coaches to the Counties of Kent and Essex. (Repealed by Statute Law Revision Act 1867 (30 & 31 Vict. c. 59))
Manufacture of Cambrics Act 1763 (repealed)	4 Geo. 3. c. 37	19 April 1764
An Act for the better establishing a Manufactory of Cambricks and Lawns, or Goods of the Kind usually known under those Denominations, now carrying on at Winchilsea, in the County of Sussex; and for improving, regulating, and extending, the Manufacture of Cambricks and Lawns, or Goods of the Kind usually known under those Denominations, in that Part of Great Britain called England. (Repealed by Statute Law Revision Act 1867 (30 & 31 Vict. c. 59))
Papists Act 1763 (repealed)	4 Geo. 3. c. 38	19 April 1764
An Act for allowing further Time for Enrolment of Deeds and Wills made by Papists; and for Relief of Protestant Purchasers. (Repealed by Statute Law Revision Act 1867 (30 & 31 Vict. c. 59))
Westminster Streets Act 1763	4 Geo. 3. c. 39	19 April 1764
An Act to explain, amend, and render more effectual, Two several Acts of Parliament, made in the Second (Note: London Streets Act 1762 (2 Geo. 3. c. 21)) and Third (Note: Streets (London) Act 1763 (3 Geo. 3. c. 32)) Years of His present Majesty, for paving, cleansing, and lighting, the Squares, Streets, and Lanes, within the City and Liberty of Westminster, and other Places therein mentioned, and for preventing Annoyances therein; and for other Purposes therein mentioned.
Doncaster Small Debts, Lighting, etc. Act 1763	4 Geo. 3. c. 40	19 April 1764
An Act for the more easy and speedy Recovery of small Debts within the Borough and Soke of Doncaster, in the County of York; and for lighting the Streets, Lanes, and other Open Passages and Places, within the said Borough.

=== Private acts ===
Short title	Citation	Royal assent
Long title
Cassau's Naturalization Act 1763	4 Geo. 3. c. 1 Pr.	19 December 1763
An Act for naturalizing Govert Cassau.
Solinus' Naturalization Act 1763	4 Geo. 3. c. 2 Pr.	19 December 1763
An Act for naturalizing Andrew Solinus.
Naturalization of Peter Hasenclever, Johann Rucker, John Blache, Andrew Vezian, James Granges and Jacob Muller.	4 Geo. 3. c. 3 Pr.	19 December 1763
An Act for naturalizing Peter Hasenclever, Johann Peter Rucker, John Francis Blache, Andrew Vezian, James Charles Granges, and Jacob Muller.
Naturalization of William Dunant, John Schrieber, Jonas Dael and Charles Thalbitzer.	4 Geo. 3. c. 4 Pr.	19 December 1763
An Act for naturalizing William Dunant, John Christian Schreiber, Jonas Dael, and Charles Henry Thalbitzer.

=== Sources ===
- "Anno quarto Georgii III". The Statutes at Large. Vol. 26 – via Internet Archive.
- Journals of the House of Commons. Vol. 29. London: His Majesty's Stationery Office. 1803. pp. 667–1058 – via Google Books.
- Chronological Table of and Index to the Statutes. Vol. 1: To the End of the Session 59 Vict. Sess. 2 (1895) (13th ed.). London: Her Majesty's Stationery Office. 1896. p. 121-122 – via Google Books.

== 1764 ==
Continuing the third session of the 12th Parliament of Great Britain, which met from 15 November 1763 until 19 April 1764.

This session was also traditionally cited as 4 G. 3.

=== Public acts ===
Short title	Citation	Royal assent
Long title
Kirby, Westmorland (Small Debts) Act 1764	4 Geo. 3. c. 41	19 April 1764
An Act for the more easy and speedy Recovery of small Debts in the Town and Parish of Kirkby in Kendal, in the County of Westmorland.
Shillingford Roads and Bridge Act 1764	4 Geo. 3. c. 42	19 December 1763
An Act for repairing and widening the Road from Shillingford in the County of Oxford, through Wallingford and Pangborne, to Reading in the County of Berks; and for building a Bridge over the River Thames, at or near Shillingford Ferry.
Hackney Poor Relief Act 1764	4 Geo. 3. c. 43	21 March 1764
An Act for maintaining, regulating, and employing, the Poor within the Parish of Saint John at Hackney, in the County of Middlesex; and for lighting the said Parish, and establishing a regular Nightly Watch therein.
Sussex Roads Act 1764	4 Geo. 3. c. 44	21 March 1764
An Act for repairing and widening the Roads from Horsham in the County of Sussex, through the Parishes of Shipley, West Grinsted, Ashurst, Steyning, Bramber, and Breeding, in the said County.
Lancashire and Cheshire Roads Act 1764	4 Geo. 3. c. 45	21 March 1764
An Act to amend and render more effectual several Acts of Parliament, for repairing the Roads from Sherbrooke Hill near Buxton and Chappell in the Frith in the County of Derby, through the Town of Stockport in the County of Chester, to Manchester in the County of Lancaster, and other Roads in the said Acts mentioned; and for turning and diverting the Roads from Whaley Bridge to Chappel in the Frith and to Sparrow Pit Gate, and from Whaley Bridge to the Western End of Longside Common in the County of Chester.
Dunbar Beer Duties Act 1764 (repealed)	4 Geo. 3. c. 46	21 March 1764
An Act to continue an Act passed in the Tenth Year of the Reign of His late Majesty King George the Second, (Note: Dunbar Beer Duties Act 1736 (10 Geo. 2. c. 4)) for continuing an Act passed in the Fifth Year of the Reign of His late Majesty King George the First, intituled, "An Act for laying a Duty of Two Pennies Scots, or One Sixth Part of a Penny Sterling, upon every Pint of Ale or Beer that shall be vended or sold within the Town of Dunbar; for improving and preserving the Harbour, and repairing the Town-house, and building a School and other public Buildings there; and for supplying the said Town with fresh Water." (Note: Dunbar Beer Duties Act 1718 (5 Geo. 1. c. 16)) (Repealed by Statute Law Revision Act 1948 (11 & 12 Geo. 6. c. 62))
Wiltshire and Hampshire Roads Act 1764	4 Geo. 3. c. 47	21 March 1764
An Act for repairing and widening the Roads from the End of Stanbridge Lane near a Barn in the Parish of Romsey to the Turnpike Road at Middle Wallop, and from the Turnpike Road between Stanbridge Lane aforesaid and Great Bridge to the Turnpike Road at Stockbridge, and from the Garden of Henry Hattat at Awbridge to the Garden Wall of Denys Rolle Esquire at East Tuderley, and from Lockerley Mill Stream to East Dean Gate, and from the said Garden Wall to the Turnpike Road leading from Stockbridge aforesaid, in the County of Southampton, to Salisbury.
Callington Roads Act 1764	4 Geo. 3. c. 48	21 March 1764
An Act for repairing and widening several Roads leading from Callington, in the County of Cornwall.
Bank of England Buildings Act 1764	4 Geo. 3. c. 49	21 March 1764
An Act to enable the Governor and Company of the Bank of England to purchase Houses and Ground, for opening a Passage for Carriages from Cornhill to The Bank, and making more commodious several other Passages leading thereto; and for enlarging the Buildings of the said Bank, and making the same more commodious.
Mercer's Company (London) Act 1764	4 Geo. 3. c. 50	5 April 1764
An Act for the Relief of the Bond and other Creditors of the Wardens and Commonalty of the Mystery of Mercers of the City of London.
Burton-upon-Trent and Derby Road Act 1764	4 Geo. 3. c. 51	21 March 1764
An Act for continuing and enlarging the Term and Powers of an Act, made in the Twenty-sixth Year of the Reign of His late Majesty King George the Second, intituled, "An Act for repairing and widening the Road from the West End of the Town of Burton upon Trent in the County of Stafford, through the said Town, to the South End of the Town of Derby in the County of Derby." (Note: Burton-upon-Trent and Derby Road Act 1753 (26 Geo. 2. c. 59))
Worksop and Attercliffe Road Act 1764	4 Geo. 3. c. 52	21 March 1764
An Act for repairing and widening the Road from Worksop in the County of Nottingham, through the Towns of Galeforth, Anston, Aston, Handsworth, and Darnall, to the North East End of Attercliffe in the County of York, where the same joins the Turnpike Road from Bawtry to Sheffield.
Lincoln Roads Act 1764	4 Geo. 3. c. 53	21 March 1764
An Act for repairing and widening the Roads from the High Bridge in Spalding to a certain Place called Tydd Goat in the County of Lincoln, and from, Sutton Saint Mary's to Sutton Wash in the said County.
South London Roads Act 1764 (repealed)	4 Geo. 3. c. 54	5 April 1764
An Act for enlarging the Term and Powers granted by an Act passed in the Twenty-fourth Year of the Reign of His late Majesty, intituled, "An Act for making, widening, and keeping in Repair, several Roads, in the several Parishes of Lambeth, Newington, Saint George Southwark, and Bermondsey, in the County of Surrey, and Lewisham in the County of Kent;" (Note: Southwark Roads Act 1750 (24 Geo. 2. c. 58)) and for repairing Lambeth Back Lane; and for lighting and watching the said Roads. (Repealed by Statute Law (Repeals) Act 2013 (c. 2))
St. Clement Danes (Poor Relief, etc.) Act 1764	4 Geo. 3. c. 55	5 April 1764
An Act for establishing a regular and Nightly Watch, and for maintaining, regulating, and employing, the Poor, within the Parish of Saint Clement Danes, in the Liberty of Westminster and County of Middlesex.
Blything, Suffolk (Poor Relief) Act 1764 (repealed)	4 Geo. 3. c. 56	5 April 1764
An Act for the better Relief and Employment of the Poor in the Hundred of Blything, in the County of Suffolk. (Repealed by Statute Law Revision Act 1948 (11 & 12 Geo. 6. c. 62))
Bosmere and Claydon, Suffolk (Poor Relief) Act 1764	4 Geo. 3. c. 57	5 April 1764
An Act for the better Relief and Employment of the Poor in the Hundred of Bosmere and Claydon, in the County of Suffolk.
Carlford, Suffolk (Poor Relief) Act 1764	4 Geo. 3. c. 58	5 April 1764
An Act to amend and render more effectual an Act passed in the Twenty-ninth Year of the Reign of His late Majesty King George the Second, intituled, "An Act for the better Relief and Employment of the Poor in the Hundreds of Colneis and Carlford, in the County of Suffolk." (Note: Carlford, Suffolk (Poor Relief) Act 1756 (29 Geo. 2. c. 79))
Samford, Suffolk (Poor Relief) Act 1764	4 Geo. 3. c. 59	5 April 1764
An Act for the better Relief and Employment of the Poor in the Hundred of Samford, in the County of Suffolk.
Gloucester (Poor Relief, etc.) Act 1764	4 Geo. 3. c. 60	5 April 1764
An Act for the more effectual Relief and Employment of the Poor within the City of Gloucester; and for lighting the Streets of the said City.
Nottinghamshire Roads Act 1764	4 Geo. 3. c. 61	5 April 1764
An Act for repairing and widening the Road from Derby to Mansfield, in the County of Nottingham, and several other Roads therein mentioned.
Hereford and Gloucester Roads Act 1764	4 Geo. 3. c. 62	5 April 1764
An Act for continuing the Terms of, and amending, the Acts for repairing several Roads leading from Ledbury, in the County of Hereford; and for widening and amending the Road through the Parish of Bromesberrow in the County of Gloucester, and through Corse Lawn, till it meets the Road from Gloucester to Worcester.
Milford to Portsmouth Road Act 1764	4 Geo. 3. c. 63	5 April 1764
An Act for amending and widening the Road from a Place near the Village of Milford, through Haslemere, to the Portsmouth Road between Lippock and Rake, in the several Counties of Surrey, Sussex, and Southampton.
Tinsley and Doncaster Road Act 1764	4 Geo. 3. c. 64	5 April 1764
An Act for amending and widening the Road from Tinsley in the County of York, to the Town of Doncaster in the said County.
Derby and Yorkshire Roads Act 1764	4 Geo. 3. c. 65	5 April 1764
An Act for amending and widening the Road from the South End of the Town of Rotherham in the County of York, to the present Turnpike Road near Pleasley in the County of Derby; and also the Road from the North End of the said Town of Rotherham into the present Turnpike Road on the East Side of Tankersley Park in the said County of York.
Yorkshire Roads Act 1764	4 Geo. 3. c. 66	5 April 1764
An Act to continue the Term, and enlarge the Powers, of an Act passed in the Seventeenth Year of the Reign of His late Majesty, (Note: Yorkshire Roads (No. 2) Act 1743 (17 Geo. 2. c. 25)) for repairing the Road between the Town of Kingston upon Hull and the Town of Beverley in the East Riding of the County of York; and for repairing the Road from Newland Bridge to the West End of the Town of Cottingham in the said Riding.
Derby and Nottinghamshire Roads Act 1764	4 Geo. 3. c. 67	5 April 1764
An Act for repairing, widening, and keeping in Repair, the High Roads leading from Alfreton in the County of Derby, through Carter's Lane, to a certain Place in the Town of Mansfield called Stockwell; and from the Bridle Gate at the Division of the Liberties of Blackwell and Hucknall, through the Town of Sutton in Ashfield, to the Mansfield and Newark Turnpike at or near Python Hill in the Forest of Sherwood in the County of Nottingham.
Rochdale to Burnley Road Act 1764	4 Geo. 3. c. 68	5 April 1764
An Act for continuing and enlarging the Term and Powers of an Act made in the Twenty-eighth Year of the Reign of His late Majesty King George the Second, intituled, "An Act for repairing and widening the Road from Rochdale to Burnley, in the County of Lancaster." (Note: Rochdale to Burnley Road Act 1755 (28 Geo. 2. c. 53))
Yorkshire Roads (No. 2) Act 1764	4 Geo. 3. c. 69	5 April 1764
An Act for repairing and widening the Road from the West End of Baxter Gate in the Town of Whitby, to the South End of Lockton Lane in the Parish of Middleton in the County of York.
Salop Roads Act 1764	4 Geo. 3. c. 70	5 April 1764
An Act for enlarging the Term and Powers of Two Acts, of the Twelfth of King George the First and of the Third of His late Majesty, for repairing several Roads therein mentioned, in the County of Salop; and also for amending and widening the Road from the Sign of The Horse Shoe in Uckington to Longnor Green, and also from the West End of Hatcham Bridge to The Cross Houses upon the Bridgenorth Turnpike Road, in the said County.
Sussex Roads (No. 2) Act 1764	4 Geo. 3. c. 71	5 April 1764
An Act for extending the Provisions of an Act passed in the Twenty-fifth Year of His late Majesty, (Note: Sussex Roads Act 1751 (25 Geo. 2. c. 50)) for repairing the Roads from the North End of Malling Street near Lewes, and other Roads in Sussex, to the Road leading from the North End of Offham to The Spital Barn in Lewes aforesaid.
Dover and Rye Harbour Act 1764	4 Geo. 3. c. 72	5 April 1764
An Act for continuing One Moiety of the Duties granted by an Act of the Eleventh and Twelfth Year of King William the Third, (Note: Dover Harbour Act 1698 (11 Will. 3. c. 5)) for the Repair of Dover Harbour, and which have been, by several other Acts, continued till the Twelfth Day of May One Thousand Seven Hundred and Sixty-five; and for applying the same to completing and keeping in Repair the Harbour of Rye, in the County of Sussex; and for more effectually completing and keeping in Repair the said Harbour.
Whitby (Improvement) Act 1764	4 Geo. 3. c. 73	5 April 1764
An Act for paving, repairing, and cleansing, the Streets, Lanes, Alleys, and Publick Passages, within the Town of Whitby, in the County of York; and for preventing Encroachments and Annoyances therein; and for regulating the Carriages, Cartmen, and Porters, there.
Kingston-upon-Hull (Improvement) Act 1764	4 Geo. 3. c. 74	5 April 1764
An Act for amending, and supplying the Deficiencies of, an Act passed in the Second Year of the Reign of His present Majesty King George the Third, intituled, "An Act to amend and render more effectual several Acts made for cleansing and enlightening the Streets of the Town of Kingston upon Hull, and for preventing Annoyances therein." (Note: Kingston-upon-Hull (Improvement) Act 1762 (2 Geo. 3. c. 70))
Wigan (Water Supply) Act 1764	4 Geo. 3. c. 75	5 April 1764
An Act for supplying the Borough and Town of Wigan, in the County of Lancaster, with fresh and wholesome Water.
Beverley and Kexby Bridge Road Act 1764	4 Geo. 3. c. 76	19 April 1764
An Act for repairing and widening the Road from Beverley to Kexby Bridge, in the County of York.
Somerset Roads Act 1764	4 Geo. 3. c. 77	19 April 1764
An Act for continuing and enlarging the Term and Powers of an Act, made in the Twenty-sixth Year of the Reign of His late Majesty, intituled, "An Act for repairing and widening the Road leading from Piper's Inn in the Parish of Ashcott in the County of Somerset, to and through Glastonbury and Wells, to the White Post in the Great Western Road to the City of Bath, and from Wells to Rush Hill leading to the City of Bristol;" (Note: Wells Roads Act 1753 (26 Geo. 2. c. 76)) and for repairing and widening several other Roads leading from the City of Wells.
Kent Roads Act 1764	4 Geo. 3. c. 78	19 April 1764
An Act for explaining and amending an Act made in the Twenty-sixth Year of the Reign of His late Majesty King George the Second, intituled, "An Act for amending, widening, and repairing, the Road leading from Dover to Barham Downs, in the County of Kent;" (Note: Kent Roads Act 1753 (26 Geo. 2. c. 68)) and also for amending, widening, and repairing, the Road leading from Cowgate and Archcliffe Fort in Dover, through Folkstone, to the Town of Hythe in the said County.
Gloucester and Worcester Roads Act 1764	4 Geo. 3. c. 79	19 April 1764
An Act to enlarge the Term and Powers of so much of an Act of the Twenty-ninth Year of the Reign of His late Majesty, (Note: Gloucestershire Roads Act 1756 (29 Geo. 2. c. 51)) for repairing and widening several Roads therein described, leading from the Town of Tewkesbury, in the County of Gloucester, as relates to the First District of Roads therein mentioned; and for amending the Road from Comb Hill to a Bridge near Norton Mill in the County of Gloucester, and from Eckington Bridge to join the Turnpike Road which leads from Upton on Severn to Pershore in the County of Worcester.
Lincoln Road Act 1764	4 Geo. 3. c. 80	19 April 1764
An Act for repairing and widening the Roads from Spalding High Bridge to the Market Place in Donington, and from the Tenth Mile Stone in the Parish of Gosbertown to the Eighth Mile Stone in the Parish of Wigtoft, in the County of Lincoln.
Salop Roads (No. 2) Act 1764	4 Geo. 3. c. 81	19 April 1764
An Act for amending, widening, and keeping in Repair, several Roads leading from the Buck's Head at Watling Street to Beckbury and The New Inn, and from Birches Brook to the Hand Post in the Parish of Kemberton, in the County of Salop.
Derby Roads Act 1764	4 Geo. 3. c. 82	19 April 1764
An Act for widening and repairing the Road leading from Ashborne in the County of Derby, over Belpar Bridge, to the present Turnpike Road from Sheffield and Chesterfield to Derby, at or near a Place called Openwood Gate, and from Belpar Bridge to Ripley in the County of Derby.
Nottinghamshire and Derby Roads Act 1764	4 Geo. 3. c. 83	19 April 1764
An Act for repairing and widening the Road from Bramcott Odd House in the County of Nottingham, to the Cross Post upon Smalley Common in the County of Derby, and from Ilkeston to the Towns of Heanor and Shipley in the said County of Derby, and from Trowell in the County of Nottingham to the Town of Nottingham.
Leicester Roads Act 1764	4 Geo. 3. c. 84	19 April 1764
An Act for repairing and widening the Roads from Melton Mowbray in the County of Leicester, to the Guide Post in Saint Margaret's Field, Leicester; and from the Town of Leicester to the Town of Lutterworth in the said County, and other Roads therein mentioned.
Dumfries and Roxburgh Roads Act 1764	4 Geo. 3. c. 85	19 April 1764
An Act for repairing and widening the Road from Scots Dyke in the County of Dumfries, by or through the Villages of Langholm and Hawick, to Haremoss in the County of Roxburgh.
Edinburgh and Linlighgow Roads Act 1764	4 Geo. 3. c. 86	19 April 1764
An Act to amend and render more effectual Two several Acts passed in the Twenty-fourth (Note: Edinburgh and Leith Road Act 1750 (24 Geo. 2. c. 35)) and Twenty-eighth (Note: Edinburgh Roads Act 1755 (28 Geo. 2. c. 39)) Years of the Reign of His late Majesty, for repairing the High Roads in the County of Edinburgh, to and from the City of Edinburgh; and from Cramond Bridge to the Town of Queensferry in the County of Linlithgow.
Bideford Roads Act 1764	4 Geo. 3. c. 87	19 April 1764
An Act for repairing several Roads leading from the Town of Bideford, in the County of Devon.
Glamorgan Roads Act 1764	4 Geo. 3. c. 88	19 April 1764
An Act for amending, widening, and keeping in Repair, several Roads leading from the Town of Cardiff, and several other Towns and Places in the County of Glamorgan.
Mutford and Lothingland, Suffolk (Poor Relief) Act 1764	4 Geo. 3. c. 89	19 April 1764
An Act for the better Relief and Employment of the Poor in the Hundred of Mutford and Lothingland, in the County of Suffolk.
Loddon and Clavering, Norfolk (Poor Relief) Act 1764 (repealed)	4 Geo. 3. c. 90	19 April 1764
An Act for the better Relief and Employment of the Poor in the Hundreds of Loddon and Clavering, in the County of Norfolk. (Repealed by Statute Law (Repeals) Act 2013 (c. 2))
Wangford, Suffolk (Poor Relief) Act 1764 (repealed)	4 Geo. 3. c. 91	19 April 1764
An Act for the better Relief and Employment of the Poor in the Hundred of Wangford, in the County of Suffolk. (Repealed by Statute Law Revision Act 1948 (11 & 12 Geo. 6. c. 62))
Portsea Improvement Act 1764	4 Geo. 3. c. 92	19 April 1764
An Act for the better paving of the Streets and Lanes, and for preventing Nuisances and other Annoyances, in that Part of the Parish of Portsea, in the County of Southampton, commonly called Portsmouth Common.
Knaresborough (Water Supply) Act 1764	4 Geo. 3. c. 93	19 April 1764
An Act for the better supplying the Town of Knaresborough, and that Part of the Township of Scriven with Tenter Gate adjoining upon the said Town, with Water.

=== Private acts ===
Short title	Citation	Royal assent
Long title
Heckington Inclosure Act 1764	4 Geo. 3. c. 5 Pr.	21 March 1764
An Act for dividing and enclosing the Open and Common Fields, Common Meadows, and other Commonable Lands, in the Parish of Heckington, in the County of Lincoln.
Guilsborough, Coton, and Nortoft (Northamptonshire) Inclosure Act 1764	4 Geo. 3. c. 6 Pr.	21 March 1764
An Act for dividing and enclosing the Open and Common Fields, Common Meadows, Common Grounds, Heath Grounds, Lanes, and Waste Ground, within Guilsborough, Coton, and Nortoft, in the County of Northampton.
Stainton in the Hole Inclosure Act 1764	4 Geo. 3. c. 7 Pr.	21 March 1764
An Act for dividing and enclosing certain Open Common Fields and Grounds in the Manor and Parish of Stainton in the Hole, in the County of Lincoln.
Searby Inclosure Act 1764	4 Geo. 3. c. 8 Pr.	21 March 1764
An Act for dividing and enclosing the Common Fields, Common and Waste Grounds, in the Parish of Searby, in the County of Lincoln.
Chilver's Coton (Warwickshire) Inclosure Act 1764	4 Geo. 3. c. 9 Pr.	21 March 1764
An Act for dividing and enclosing the Open and Common Fields, and Commons or Waste Grounds, in the Parish of Chilvers Coton, in the County of Warwick.
North Tuddenham or St. Clares, Mattishall Tuddenham, and Bell-house Hall (Norfolk) Inclosure Act 1764	4 Geo. 3. c. 10 Pr.	21 March 1764
An Act for enclosing and dividing so much of the Moor, or Common, called Badley Moor, as lies within the Manors of North Tuddenham alias Saint Clares, Mattishall Tuddenham, on the Part of North Tuddenham and Bell-house Hall, and in the Parish of North Tuddenham, in the County of Norfolk, and certain other Commons and Wastes within the said Manors and Parish.
Horbling (Lincolnshire) Inclosure and Drainage Act 1764	4 Geo. 3. c. 11 Pr.	21 March 1764
An Act for dividing and enclosing the Open and Common Fields, Meadows, and Common Fen, in the Parish of Horbling, in the County of Lincoln; and for draining and improving the said Fen.
Billesdon Inclosure Act 1764	4 Geo. 3. c. 12 Pr.	21 March 1764
An Act for dividing and enclosing the Open Fields and Commonable Places of and in Billesdon, in the County of Leicester.
Sudcoates Inclosure Act 1764	4 Geo. 3. c. 13 Pr.	21 March 1764
An Act for establishing and confirming the Enclosure and Division of certain Lands in Sudcoates, in the Parish of Drypool, in the County of York; and for other Purposes.
St. Margaret near Leicester Inclosure Act 1764 (repealed)	4 Geo. 3. c. 14 Pr.	21 March 1764
An Act for dividing and enclosing several Common and Open Fields and Meadows in the Parish of Saint Margaret; near the Borough of Leicester, in the County of Leicester. (Repealed by Leicestershire Act 1985 (c. xvii))
Wartnaby Inclosure Act 1764	4 Geo. 3. c. 15 Pr.	21 March 1764
An Act for dividing and enclosing the Open and Common Fields of Wartnaby, in the County of Leicester, and all the Lands and Grounds within the same Fields.
North Cave Inclosure Act 1764	4 Geo. 3. c. 16 Pr.	21 March 1764
An Act for dividing and enclosing the Open and Common Fields, Meadows, and Pastures, of North Cave, in the East Riding of the County of York.
Skipsea Inclosure Act 1764	4 Geo. 3. c. 17 Pr.	21 March 1764
An Act for confirming Articles of Agreement, for enclosing and dividing several Open Fields, and several Pieces or Parcels of Arable, Meadow, and Pasture Ground, within the Township of Skipsea, in the County of York.
Skeffling Inclosure Act 1764	4 Geo. 3. c. 18 Pr.	21 March 1764
An Act for dividing and enclosing the Open and Common Fields and Grounds in the Township and Parish of Skeffling in Holderness, in the County of York.
Bromley Inclosure Act 1764	4 Geo. 3. c. 19 Pr.	21 March 1764
An Act for extinguishing the Right of Common in, over, and upon, certain Commonable Lands and Grounds within the Manor and Parish of Bromley, in the County of Kent.
Exempting Batchacre Grange (Staffordshire, Salop) from payment of tithes and ecclesiastical dues and settling other tithes in lieu thereof.	4 Geo. 3. c. 20 Pr.	21 March 1764
An Act for exempting Batchacre Grange, in the Counties of Stafford and Salop, or One of them, from Payment of Tithes and other Ecclesiastical Dues; and for settling other Tithes in Lieu thereof.
Helgay (Norfolk) Drainage Act 1764	4 Geo. 3. c. 21 Pr.	21 March 1764
An Act for draining certain Fen Lands and Wet Grounds in the Parish of Helgay, in the County of Norfolk.
Thorngumbald (Yorkshire) Drainage Act 1764	4 Geo. 3. c. 22 Pr.	21 March 1764
An Act for draining and preserving certain Marsh Lands and Low Grounds within the Township of Thorngumbald, in the County of York.
Bland's Estate Act 1764	4 Geo. 3. c. 23 Pr.	21 March 1764
An Act for establishing and carrying into Execution certain Articles of Agreement therein mentioned, for a Division of certain Real Estates, in the County of York, late of Sir Hungerford Bland Baronet, deceased; and for other Purposes therein mentioned.
Newport's Estate Act 1764	4 Geo. 3. c. 24 Pr.	21 March 1764
An Act for empowering the Committee or Committees, for the Time being, of the Estate of John Newport Esquire, a Lunatick, to make Leases of his Estates during his Lunacy.
Executing an agreement between the hospital for the Maintenance and Education of Exposed and Deserted Young Children and Robert Needham, concerning an estate in Jamaica devised by Henry Needham's will.	4 Geo. 3. c. 25 Pr.	21 March 1764
An Act for carrying into Execution an Agreement between the Governors and Guardians of the Hospital for the Maintenance and Education of Exposed and Deserted Young Children, and Robert Nedham Esquire, deceased, relating to an Estate in the Island of Jamaica, devised by the Will of Henry Nedham Esquire, deceased.
All Souls' College Oxford and East Lockinge Rectory Annexation Act 1764	4 Geo. 3. c. 26 Pr.	21 March 1764
An Act for annexing the Rectory of East Lockinge, in the County of Berks, to the Office of Warden of the College of The Souls of All faithful People deceased, of Oxford.
Tregenna's Estates Act 1764	4 Geo. 3. c. 27 Pr.	21 March 1764
An Act for Sale of the Freehold and Leasehold Estates of John Tregenna Clerk, deceased, in the County of Cornwall, given and devised by his Will, in Trust, for his Children; and for paying and applying the Money to arise by such Sale in Manner therein mentioned.
Rochdale (Lancashire) Vicarage Glebe Lands Act 1764 (repealed)	4 Geo. 3. c. 28 Pr.	21 March 1764
An Act to enable the Vicar of the Parish of Rochdale, in the County of Lancaster, to grant a Lease or Leases of the Glebe Lands belonging to the said Vicarage. (Repealed by Rochdale Vicarage Act 1866 (29 & 30 Vict. c. 86))
Bury (Lancashire) Rectory Glebe Lands Act 1764	4 Geo. 3. c. 29 Pr.	21 March 1764
An Act to enable the Rector of the Parish and Parish Church of Bury, in the County of Lancaster, for the Time being, to grant Leases of the Glebe belonging to the said Rectory.
Making the exemplification of Thomas King's will evidence in all British and Irish courts.	4 Geo. 3. c. 30 Pr.	21 March 1764
An Act for making the Exemplification of the Will of Thomas King Esquire, deceased, Evidence in all Courts of Law and Equity in Great Britain and Ireland.
Peers' Name Act 1764	4 Geo. 3. c. 31 Pr.	21 March 1764
An Act to enable Richard Symons, an Infant (lately called Richard Peers), and the Heirs of his Body, to take and use the Surname of Symons, pursuant to the Will of Richard Symons Esquire, deceased.
Naturalization of William Dingman and John Reincke.	4 Geo. 3. c. 32 Pr.	21 March 1764
An Act for naturalizing William Dingman and John Reincke.
Naturalization of John Marteilhe.	4 Geo. 3. c. 33 Pr.	21 March 1764
An Act for naturalizing John Martelihe of London Merchant.
Naturalization of Egbert Nonnen.	4 Geo. 3. c. 34 Pr.	21 March 1764
An Act for naturalizing Egbert Nonnen.
Sharnford (Leicestershire) Inclosure Act 1764	4 Geo. 3. c. 35 Pr.	5 April 1764
An Act for dividing and enclosing the Common and Open Fields and Commonable Places of Sharnford, in the County of Leicester.
Whetstone (Leicestershire) Inclosure Act 1764	4 Geo. 3. c. 36 Pr.	5 April 1764
An Act for dividing and enclosing the Open and Common Fields, Common Pastures, Common Meadows, and other Commonable Lands and Grounds, in Whetstone, in the County of Leicester.
Fotherby (Lincolnshire) Inclosure Act 1764	4 Geo. 3. c. 37 Pr.	5 April 1764
An Act for dividing and enclosing the Open and Common Fields, Common Meadows, Lammas Grounds, and other Commonable Lands and Grounds, in the Parish of Fotherby, in the County of Lincoln.
Stoney Stanton and Potters Marston (Leicestershire) Inclosure Act 1764	4 Geo. 3. c. 38 Pr.	5 April 1764
An Act for dividing and enclosing the Open Fields and Commonable Places in the Parish of Stoney Stanton, in the County of Leicester, and the Lands, Meadows, and Commonable Places, in the Lordship of Potters Marston, in the said County, belonging to, and used with, the said Fields of Stoney Stanton.
Aldborough Inclosure Act 1764	4 Geo. 3. c. 39 Pr.	5 April 1764
An Act for dividing, allotting, and enclosing, the Open Fields and Pasture Ground in the Lordship of Aldbrough in Holderness, in the County of York.
Houghton in the Marsh or Holton in the Clay (Lincolnshire) Inclosure Act 1764	4 Geo. 3. c. 40 Pr.	5 April 1764
An Act for dividing and enclosing the several Open and Common Fields, and Ings, within the Township and Parish of Houghton in the Marsh, otherwise Holton in the Clay, in the County of Lincoln.
Stoke Albany Inclosure Act 1764	4 Geo. 3. c. 41 Pr.	5 April 1764
An Act for dividing and enclosing the Open and Common Fields lying in the Manor and Parish of Stoke Albany, in the County of Northampton.
Newnham Inclosure Act 1764	4 Geo. 3. c. 42 Pr.	5 April 1764
An Act for dividing and enclosing the Common Fields, Common Pastures, Common Meadows, Common Grounds, and Waste Grounds, of and in the Manor and Parish of Newnham, in the County of Northampton.
Everdon Inclosure Act 1764	4 Geo. 3. c. 43 Pr.	5 April 1764
An Act for dividing and enclosing the Common Fields, Common Pastures, Common Meadows, Common Grounds, and Waste Grounds, of and in the Manor and Parish of Everdon, otherwise Great Everdon, and Little Everdon, in the County of Northampton.
Ledgers Ashby Inclosure Act 1764	4 Geo. 3. c. 44 Pr.	5 April 1764
An Act for enclosing and dividing the Common Fields, Common Pastures, Common Grounds, and Waste Grounds, in the Parish of Ledgers Ashby, in the County of Northampton.
Crook and Billyrow (Durham) Inclosure Act 1764	4 Geo. 3. c. 45 Pr.	5 April 1764
An Act for dividing and enclosing a certain Moor, or Common, in the Township of Crook and Billyrow, within the Parish of Brancepeth, in the County of Durham.
Atherstone Inclosure Act 1764	4 Geo. 3. c. 46 Pr.	5 April 1764
An Act for dividing and enclosing the Open and Common Fields of Atherstone, in the County of Warwick, and all the Lands, Meadows, and Grounds, within the same.
Holderness Drainage Act 1764	4 Geo. 3. c. 47 Pr.	5 April 1764
An Act for draining, preserving, and improving, the Low Grounds and Carrs lying and being in the Parishes, Townships, Hamlets, Lordships, Precincts, and Territories, of Sutton, Ganstead, Swine, Benningholme, Benningholme Grange, and Fairholme, North Skirlaugh, Rowton, Arnold, Long Riston, Leven Heigholme, and Hallytree-Holme, Brandes-Burton, and Bursall, Eske, Tickton, Weel, Routh, Meaux, and Waghen otherwise Wawn, in Holderness, in the East Riding of the County of York.
John Viscount Spencer's Estate Act 1764	4 Geo. 3. c. 48 Pr.	5 April 1764
An Act to empower the Right Honourable John Lord Viscount Spencer to make Leases of the Manor of Battersea and Wandsworth, and of Lands and Grounds in Battersea and Wandsworth, in the County of Surrey, purchased in Pursuance of the Will of the most Noble Sarab late Dutches Dowager of Marlborough, in order for building upon and improving the same.
Horton's Estates Act 1764	4 Geo. 3. c. 49 Pr.	5 April 1764
An Act for confirming a Partition of several Estates, late of Thomas Horton, in the Counties of Wilts and Gloucester, between William Blanch, John Roberts, Richard Brereton, and others; and for vesting and settling the Premises to the several Uses therein mentioned.
Beagham's Estate Act 1764	4 Geo. 3. c. 50 Pr.	5 April 1764
An Act for vesting the Estate late of Edmund Hungate Beaghan Esquire, deceased, in the Counties of Kent and Sussex, in Trustees, in Trust, to sell and convey the same to Edward Louisa Mann Esquire, or as he shall appoint, pursuant to an Agreement for that Purpose; and for applying the Money arising by such Sale for the Benefit of George Edmund Beaghan, his only Son and Heir, an Infant.
Brett's Estate Act 1764	4 Geo. 3. c. 51 Pr.	5 April 1764
An Act for vesting divers Messuages and Hereditaments in the City of London, the settled Estate of Elizabeth Brett, Wife of Charles Brett Esquire, in the said Charles Brett and his Heirs, discharged from the Uses of his Marriage Settlement; and for settling another Estate, in the County of Middlesex, of greater Value, in Lieu thereof, to the Uses limited of the said Estate.
Discharging uses and trusts of lands and manors in Norfolk, settled for benefit of William Wigget and Mary Bullwer and settling others in the same county.	4 Geo. 3. c. 52 Pr.	5 April 1764
An Act for discharging the Uses and Trusts of certain Manors, Lands, and Hereditaments, in the County of Norfolk, settled upon, and for the Benefit of, William Wiggett Bulwer and Mary his Wife, and their Issue; and for substituting and settling other Estates and Hereditaments in the same County, of greater Value, in Lieu thereof, to the like Uses.
Delaune's Estate Act 1764	4 Geo. 3. c. 53 Pr.	5 April 1764
An Act for vesting Two Shares in Ranelagh House, Gardens, and Premises, late the Estate of James Delaune, deceased, in John Ferrett and Robert Edmeston, and their Heirs, in Trust, to sell the same, and apply the Money arising from such Sale to the several Charitable Purposes as directed by the Will of the said James Delaune.
Young's Estate Act 1764	4 Geo. 3. c. 54 Pr.	5 April 1764
An Act for vesting the settled Estate of William Young Esquire, in the County of Wilts, in Trustees, to be sold; and for laying out the Money arising thereby, together with other Money of the said William Young, in the Purchase of other Hereditaments, of greater Value, to be settled in Lieu thereof.
John Carter's Name Act 1764	4 Geo. 3. c. 55 Pr.	5 April 1764
An Act to enable John Pollard Esquire (lately called John Carter) and his Heirs Male to take and use the Surname and Arms of Pollard, pursuant to the Will of Elizabeth Pollard, deceased.
Naturalization of James de Berville, Johann Uckermann and John Hauser.	4 Geo. 3. c. 56 Pr.	5 April 1764
An Act for naturalizing James Nehou de Berville, Johann Jacob Uckermann, and John Hauser.
Naturalization of James Alric.	4 Geo. 3. c. 57 Pr.	5 April 1764
An Act for naturalizing James Alric.
West Haddon (Northamptonshire) Inclosure Act 1764	4 Geo. 3. c. 58 Pr.	19 April 1764
An Act for dividing and enclosing the Open and Common Fields, Common Pastures, Common Meadows, Common Grounds, Heath, and Waste Ground, in the Manor and Parish of West Haddon, in the County of Northampton.
Newport (Salop.) Inclosure Act 1764 (repealed)	4 Geo. 3. c. 59 Pr.	19 April 1764
An Act for dividing and enclosing a Waste Ground called The Marsh, in the Township of Newport, in the County of Salop; and applying the Produce thereof to the several Purposes therein mentioned. (Repealed by Newport (Salop.) Marsh Improvement Act 1854 (17 & 18 Vict. c. lxxxi))
Enabling Lucy Knightly to make inclosures in Haversham (Buckinghamshire), vesting in him certain glebe lands and tithes belonging to Haversham rectory and compensating the rector for the same.	4 Geo. 3. c. 60 Pr.	19 April 1764
An Act to enable Lucy Knightley Esquire to enclose several Open and Common Fields in the Parish of Haversham, in the County of Bucks; and for vesting certain Glebe Lands, and the Tithes belonging to the Rectory of Haversham aforesaid in the said Lucy Knightley and his Heirs; and for making a Compensation to the Rector of the said Parish, in Lieu thereof.
Westbury Inclosure Act 1764	4 Geo. 3. c. 61 Pr.	19 April 1764
An Act for dividing and enclosing the Open and Common Field, Common Meadows, Common Pastures, Common Grounds, and Commonable Lands, within the Manor, Parish, and Liberties of Westbury, in the County of Buckingham.
Nether Broughton Inclosure Act 1764	4 Geo. 3. c. 62 Pr.	19 April 1764
An Act for dividing and enclosing the Common Fields, Common Meadows, and Common Pastures, in the Parish of Nether Broughton, in the County of Leicester.
Staindrop Inclosure Act 1764	4 Geo. 3. c. 63 Pr.	19 April 1764
An Act for dividing and enclosing a Moor, or Common, called Staindrop Moor, within the Township of Staindrop, in the County of Durham.
Great Wigston Inclosure Act 1764	4 Geo. 3. c. 64 Pr.	19 April 1764
An Act for dividing and enclosing the Open and Common Fields in the Parish of Great Wigston, in the County of Leicester.
Husbands Boswoth or Boresworth (Leicestershire) Inclosure Act 1764	4 Geo. 3. c. 65 Pr.	19 April 1764
An Act for dividing and enclosing the Open and Common Fields, Common Pastures, Common Meadows, Common Grounds, and Waste Grounds, in the Parish of Husbands Bosworth, otherwise Boresworth, in the County of Leicester.
Wombwell Inclosure Act 1764	4 Geo. 3. c. 66 Pr.	19 April 1764
An Act for dividing and enclosing the Common or Waste Grounds within the Manor of Wombwell, in the County of York.
Warkworth Inclosure Act 1764	4 Geo. 3. c. 67 Pr.	19 April 1764
An Act for dividing and enclosing the Open and Common Field, Common Meadows, Common Pastures, Common Grounds, and Commonable Lands, lying within the Township, Hamlets, and Liberties, of Warkworth, in the County of Northampton.
Earl of Ashburnham's Estate Act 1764	4 Geo. 3. c. 68 Pr.	19 April 1764
An Act for vesting divers Manors, Lands, and Hereditaments, in the Counties of Bedford, Dorset, and Lancaster, comprised in the Marriage Settlement of John Earl of Ashburnham, in him the said Earl, in Fee Simple, discharged of the Uses and Trusts of that Settlement; and for substituting and settling other Lands and Hereditaments, in the Dominion of Wales, in Lieu thereof, and to the like Uses.
Earl of Egremont's Estate Act 1764	4 Geo. 3. c. 69 Pr.	19 April 1764
An Act to empower the Guardians of George Earl of Egremont, an Infant, to enfranchise certain Customary Lands and Hereditaments, in the County of Cumberland, Part of the settled Estates of the said Earl; and also to empower the Guardians of the said Earl and his Infant Brothers to make Leases of Part of the said Estates in the County of Cumberland; and to make Leases and Copyhold Grants of the several Estates limited and devised to them respectively by Charles Earl of Egremont, their late Father, deceased; and for other the Purposes therein mentioned.
Earl of Barymore's Estate Act 1764	4 Geo. 3. c. 70 Pr.	19 April 1764
An Act for vesting Lands and Hereditaments in Great Britain and Ireland, Part of the Estate of James Earl of Barrymore, in Trustees, for raising Money towards paying and discharging the Debts and Encumbrances affecting his Real Estates.
Henrietta Rosa Peregrina Townsend's Estate Act 1764	4 Geo. 3. c. 71 Pr.	19 April 1764
An Act for settling the Estate of Henrietta Rosa Peregrina Townsend, Wife of James Townsend Esquire, according to certain Articles of Agreement executed before her Intermarriage with the said James Townsend, but subject to the Charges and Encumbrances affecting the same.
Harpur Trust Act 1764 (repealed)	4 Geo. 3. c. 72 Pr.	19 April 1764
An Act for enlarging the charitable Uses, extending the Objects, and regulating the Application of the Rents and Profits, of the Estates given by Sir William Harpur Knight and Dame Alice his Wife, for the Benefit of the Poor, and other Objects of Charity, of the Town of Bedford. (Repealed by Bedford School Act 1826 (7 Geo. 4. c. 29 Pr.))
Christ's College Manchester Glebe Lands Act 1764	4 Geo. 3. c. 73 Pr.	19 April 1764
An Act to enable the Warden and Fellows of the College of Christ in Manchester, in the County Palatine of Lancaster, for the Time being, to grant Leases of the Glebe belonging to the said College.
Empowering George Lane Parker to shut up a road used over certain inclosed lands in Gamlingay (Cambridgeshire) and extinguishing all right to a toll to which he is entitled in two lanes near the road and obliging him to keep them in good repair.	4 Geo. 3. c. 74 Pr.	19 April 1764
An Act to empower the Honourable George Lane Parker to shut up a Road or Way now used, over certain enclosed Lands, in the Parish of Gamlingay, in the County of Cambridge; and for extinguishing all Right to a certain Toll which he is now entitled to, in Two Lanes near the said Road or Way; and for obliging him to keep the said Lanes in Repair.
Plunkett's Estate Act 1764	4 Geo. 3. c. 75 Pr.	19 April 1764
An Act for enlarging the Time given to Trustees therein named, to execute certain Trusts vested in them in and by an Act of Parliament made in the Sixteenth Year of the Reign of His late Majesty, intituled, "An Act for vesting the Remainder in Fee of several Lands in Ireland, the Estate of Arthur Plunkett Esquire, in Trustees, in order to sell such Lands to Protestant Purchasers;" (Note: Plunkett's Estate Act 1742 (16 Geo. 2. c. 21 Pr.)) and also by another Act of Parliament made in the Thirty-second Year of the Reign of His said late Majesty, intituled, "An Act for giving further Time to Trustees therein named, to execute certain Trusts vested in them in and by the said Act of Parliament made in the said Sixteenth Year of the Reign of His said late Majesty." (Note: Plunkett's Estate Act 1758 (32 Geo. 2. c. 40 Pr.))
Divesting out of the crown, the reversion in fee of papist Mathew Dowdall's estate in Ireland, expectant of the death of his three grandsons without issue male and vesting the same in Anthony Ladeveze, a Protestant.	4 Geo. 3. c. 76 Pr.	19 April 1764
An Act for divesting out of the Crown the Reversion in Fee of certain Lands in Ireland, late the Estate of Mathew Dowdall, a Papist, deceased, expectant upon the Death of his Three Grandsons without Issue Male and for vesting the same in Anthony Ladeveze of the City of Dublin Esquire, a Protestant, and his Heirs.
Divesting out of the crown the reversion in fee of lands in Ireland and vesting in Gerald Fitzgerald.	4 Geo. 3. c. 77 Pr.	19 April 1764
An Act for divesting out of the Crown, and to vest in Gerald Fitzgerald of Rathrone in the County of Meath in the Kingdom of Ireland Esquire, and his Heirs, the Reversion in Fee of and in several Lands in Ireland.
Enabling the exchange of lands in Saffron Waldon (Essex) between Sir John Griffin Griffin and the trustees of King Edward VI's almshouses there and Thomas Fuller.	4 Geo. 3. c. 78 Pr.	19 April 1764
An Act to enable the Mayor and Aldermen of the Town of Saffron Walden, in the County of Essex, the Guardians or Trustees of King Edward the Sixth's Almshouses there, and other the Feoffees thereof, to convey Part of the Lands, Revenues, and Possessions, of the said Almshouses, to Sir John Griffin Griffin, in Exchange for other Lands, of greater Value, to be conveyed to and held by them, to the Uses and upon the Trusts therein mentioned; and for vesting Part of the Lands of Thomas Fuller, an Infant in Saffron Walden aforesaid, in the said Sir John Griffin Griffin, in Exchange for other Lands, of greater Value, to be conveyed to the said Infant and his Heirs; and for other Purposes therein mentioned.
Bayly's Estate Act 1764	4 Geo. 3. c. 79 Pr.	19 April 1764
An Act for vesting certain Messuages, Lands, Tenements, and Hereditaments, in the Town and County of Northampton, devised by the Will of Edward Bayly, deceased, in Trustees, to be sold; and for laying out the Money arising by such Sale in the Purchase of other Lands, to be settled to the like Uses.
Weller Divorce Act 1764	4 Geo. 3. c. 80 Pr.	19 April 1764
An Act to dissolve the Marriage of John Weller Esquire with Charlotte Wilson his now Wife; and to enable him to marry again; and for other Purposes therein mentioned.
Naturalization of Peter Pohlmann and David Godin.	4 Geo. 3. c. 81 Pr.	19 April 1764
An Act for naturalizing Peter Polhmann and David Godin.
Kock's Naturalization Act 1764	4 Geo. 3. c. 82 Pr.	19 April 1764
An Act for naturalizing Henry Kock.
Poittier's Naturalization Act 1764	4 Geo. 3. c. 83 Pr.	19 April 1764
An Act for naturalizing Alexander Joseph Poittier.

=== Sources ===
- "4 George III - 1763-4". The Statutes at Large. Vol. 26. 1762 – via Internet Archive.
- Journals of the House of Commons. Vol. 29. London: His Majesty's Stationery Office. 1803. pp. 667–1058 – via Google Books.
- Chronological Table of and Index to the Statutes. Vol. 1: To the End of the Session 59 Vict. Sess. 2 (1895) (13th ed.). London: Her Majesty's Stationery Office. 1896. pp. 121–122 – via Google Books.

== See also ==
- List of acts of the Parliament of Great Britain
