= Dover Western Heights =

Earthworks and forts in Dover, England

Coordinates: 51.119014°N 1.301022°E

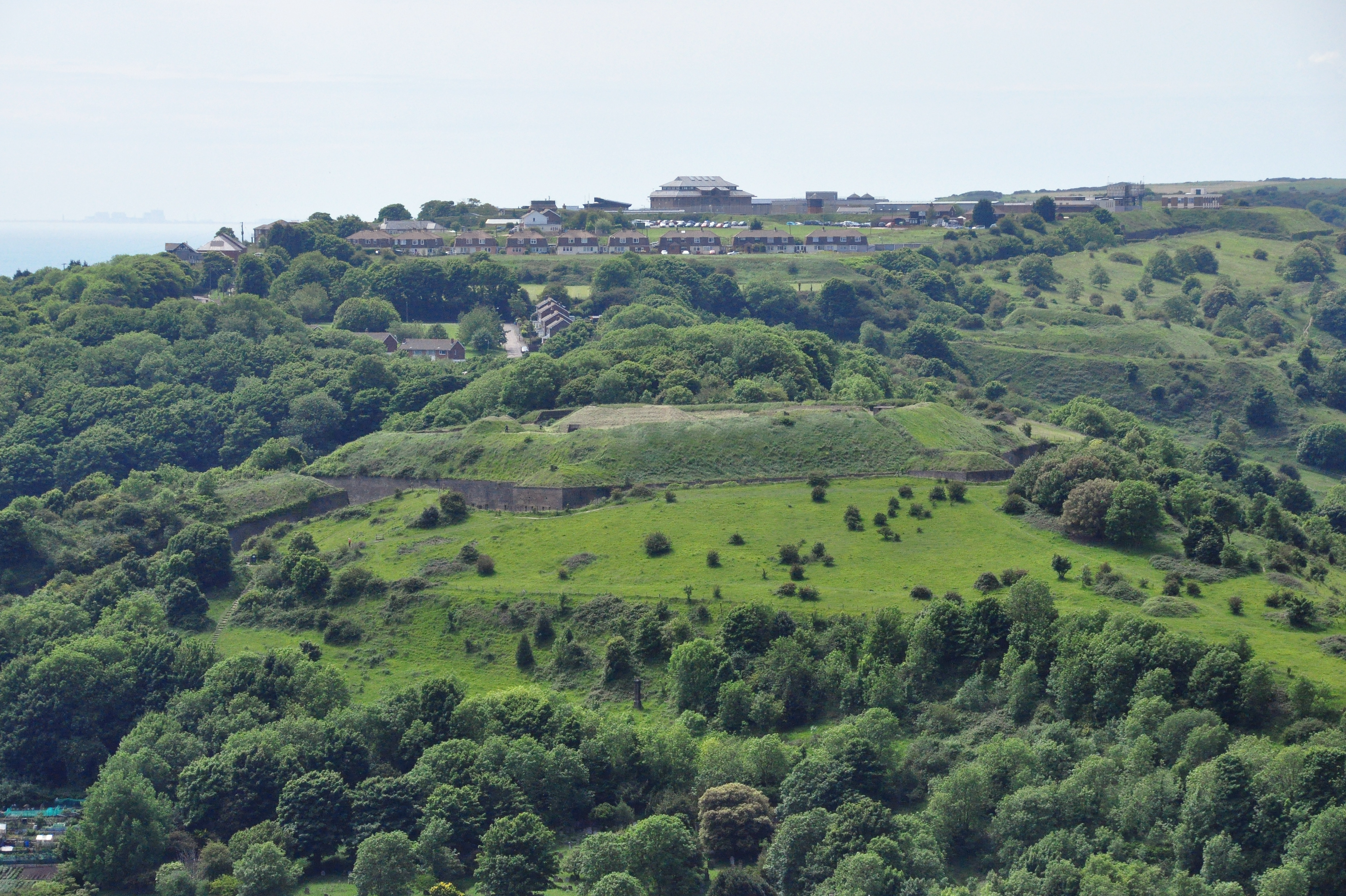
The Western Heights from Dover Castle: Drop Redoubt is in the foreground, the Citadel is in the background

The Western Heights of Dover is a series of forts and ditches in Dover, England. They were created in the 18th and 19th centuries to augment the existing defences and protect the key port of Dover from both seaward and landward attack. In the early 20th century, the Dover Western Heights was collectively reputed to be the "strongest and most elaborate" fortification in the country. The Army withdrew from the Heights in 1956–61. They are now a local nature reserve.

== Introduction ==
First given earthworks in 1779 against the planned invasion that year, the high ground west of Dover was properly fortified in 1804 when Lieutenant-Colonel William Twiss was instructed to modernise the existing defences. This was part of a huge programme of fortification in response to Napoleon's planned invasion of the United Kingdom. It followed a sustained period of related work by Twiss on upgrading the fortifications of nearby Dover Castle (1794–1803).

== The Citadel ==
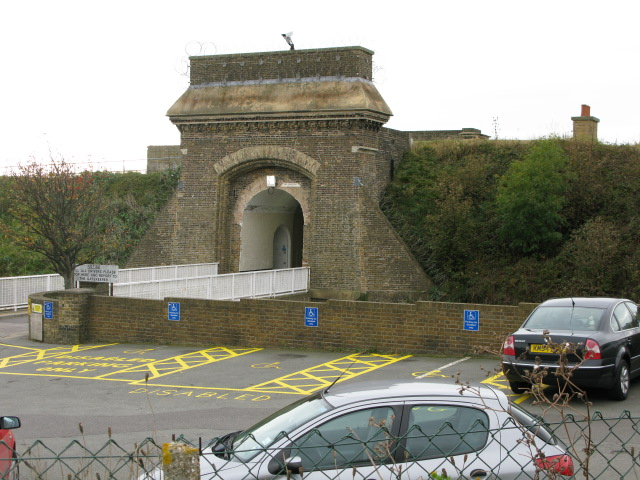
The entrance to the Citadel.

The Citadel, lying at the western end of the Heights, formed its main defensive point. The Citadel began as a large bastioned fieldwork, constructed in the early 1780s and containing within its fortifications three loopholed guard houses.

In 1804, plans were made to rebuild both the 'West and East Redoubts' (i.e. the Citadel and Drop Redoubt) and to link them with earthworks along the length of the Heights. By 1806, the rebuilt Citadel was surrounded by an unrevetted defensive ditch. In the centre was a set of temporary barracks huts, and the three guardhouses. In 1809, a well was sunk to ensure a permanent supply of water in case of a siege. In 1860, a pumphouse was added .

In 1807, following a collapse of part of the fortifications, another application was made for revetting to take place. At the end of the Napoleonic Wars the Citadel remained unfinished. In 1853, at the start of the Crimean War, work resumed on completing and revetting the ditches. At the same time, some of the existing casemates were adapted to provide barracks accommodation for 500 men.

By 1860, the Citadel was entered via a drawbridge over the ditch, through a gate on the eastern side. A tunnel then led through the rampart into the fort by way of the main guard room.

Between 1860 and 1874 outworks were added. By now, within the ramparts, the Citadel contained barracks, stores and magazines arrayed around a large parade ground. The bomb-proof Officers' Quarters and Mess, built by Major William Jervois in 1860, was designed in part to be able to function as a defensible keep in the event of the Citadel being stormed by the enemy.

After 1890 the Citadel ceased to have a defensive role and functioned as a large barracks and mobilisation centre, with additional hut accommodation provided for up to 900 soldiers in total. During World War I it was occupied by the 3rd (Reserve) Battalion, Buffs (East Kent Regiment), charged with training reinforcement drafts for the service battalions serving overseas. In 1956, the Citadel was handed over to HM Prison Service. It served successively as a Borstal, a Youth Custody Centre and a Young Offender Institution.

=== Armaments ===
It was initially envisaged that the Citadel would be armed with forty-three 18-pounder guns, and thirty-one carronades. By the 1860s, it was re-armed with eighteen 18-pounder carronades, twenty 12-pounder carronades and ten 8-inch mortars.

== Drop Redoubt ==
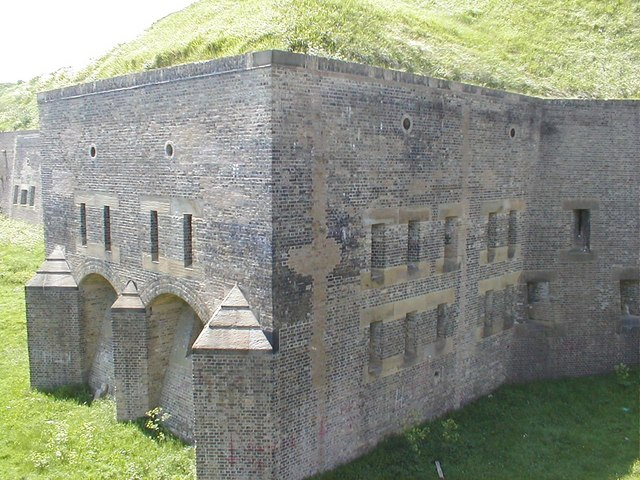
A caponier of the Drop Redoubt

The Drop Redoubt is one of the two forts on Western Heights, and is linked to the Citadel by a series of dry moats. Prior to construction of the Redoubt a bastioned fort stood there as part of the 18th-century fortifications. The construction of the Redoubt was in two periods: the first being from 1804 to 1808 during the Napoleonic Wars, and the second from 1859 to 1864 following the recommendations of the 1859 Royal Commission.

=== First Period ===
The original form of the Drop Redoubt was a simple pentagon, formed by cutting trenches into the hillside and revetting (facing) them with brickwork. Thus, the Redoubt was a solid ‘island’ with barracks, magazine, and artillery, on top. Originally, it would have accommodated 200 troops. By 1893, the numbers had been reduced to just 90.

A striking feature of the first period is the Soldiers’ Quarters – five bomb-proof casemates. These are parabolic in cross section and covered in a thick layer of earth to withstand the effect of mortar-bombs. The windows at the rear of each open into a trench, to protect them against blast.

=== Second Period ===
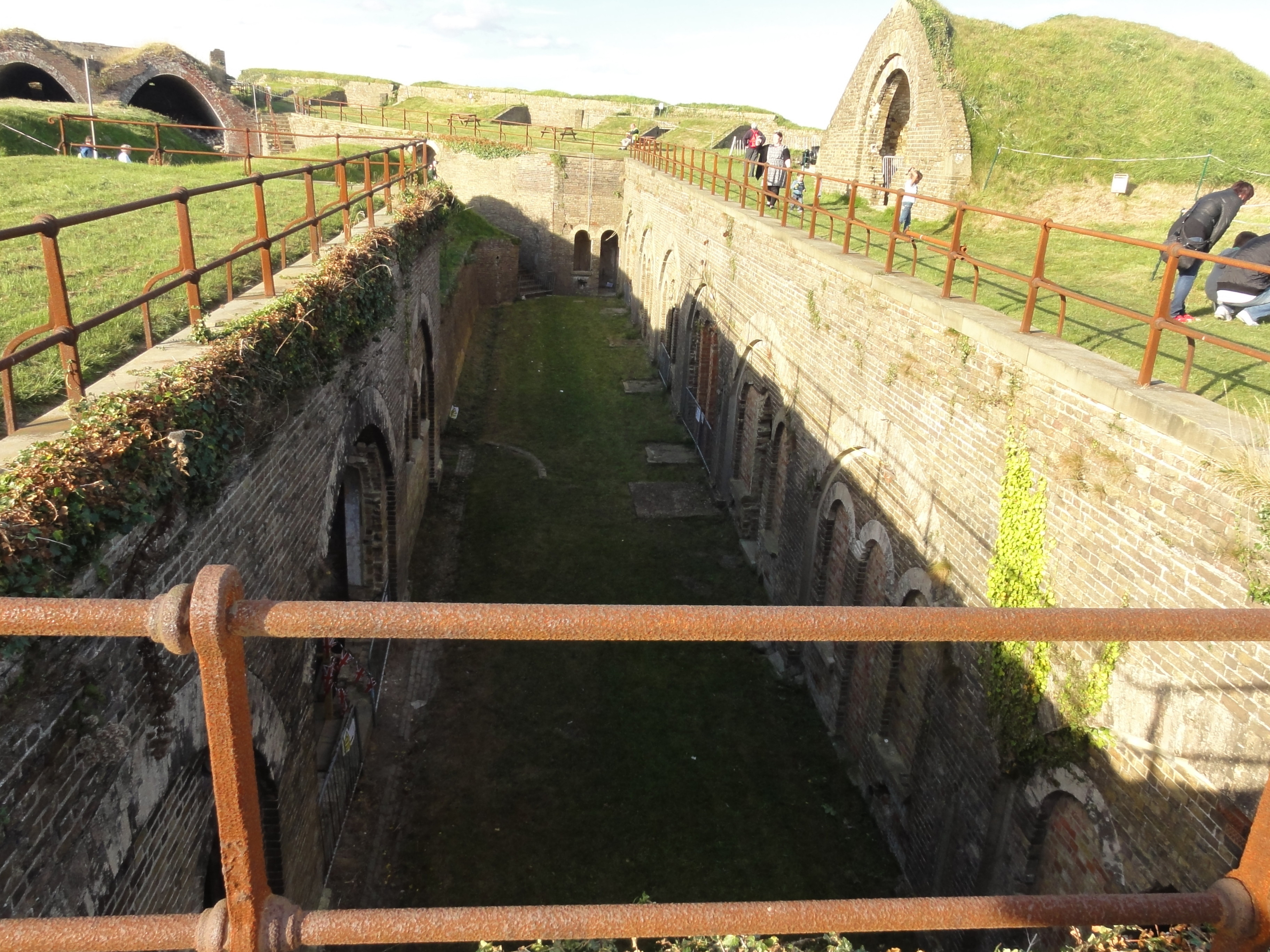
Inside the Redoubt: soldiers' barracks (top left), guardroom (below left), officers' quarters (below right), small arms store (top right)

The rise of Napoleon III during the 1850s caused a further invasion scare, and a Royal Commission was set up in 1859 to investigate the defences of Britain. More work was deemed necessary at the Heights, and the Drop Redoubt had its defences improved. Caponiers were added to four of the corners of the existing fort, each with a stone staircase leading up to the top of the Redoubt. Gunrooms were built alongside two of them to allow fire along the North and South-East Lines. The original magazine was enlarged, and covered with a large earth bank as protection from mortar-fire.

The Officers’ Quarters, Guardroom, and cells date from this period. They can be distinguished from the earlier work by the semi-circular shape of their arches.

During World War II, the Redoubt housed a squad of commandos that, in the event of invasion, would have been responsible for destroying Dover Harbour. Their presence was secret and the lines around the Redoubt were mined. Evidence of their stay are the sally ports in Caponiers 1 & 2, and the short tunnel leading from the encircling line to Drop Redoubt Road.

The entrance to Drop Redoubt was via a bridge. The inner third of this was pivoted so that the Redoubt could be isolated. The pivot and the recess into which the bridge swung can still be seen, although the bridge has long since gone. In the 1980s, a temporary scaffolding bridge was built by the army to enable access for guided tours of the Redoubt. In the mid-1990s, this was removed to prevent unauthorised entry and vandalism.

=== Armaments ===
Originally, the Redoubt was to be equipped with 12 smooth bore 24-pounder guns and two carronades. It is unlikely that many were installed, since the Napoleonic War was almost over by the time construction was completed. In 1851, three 24-pounders were in place, with six 12-pounder saluting guns and an 8" mortar.

Following the Second Period, eleven Armstrong 64-pounder Rifled Breech Loaders were installed on traversing carriages. These proved unsatisfactory and a return was made to muzzle loaders.

The artillery at the Redoubt faced mostly inland. It was intended to attack an invading force attempting to capture Dover from the rear.

== Outer defences ==
As part of the first rebuilding, from 1804 onwards, a series of earthworks (ramparts and ditches) were constructed: the North Lines, running along the ridge between the Citadel and Drop Redoubt; the South Lines, descending from the Citadel to the Old Folkestone Road (where a bridge across the defensive ditch provided access to the fortress, by way of the South Military Road, as well as to the harbour beyond); and the North-East Line, running east from the Drop Redoubt.

During the building of the defensive lines (1809–16) a tiered bulwark, the 'North-West Bastion', was built on the edge of the Citadel flanking the northern slope of the Heights. At the same time the 'North-Centre Bastion' was built, halfway along the earthworks between the Citadel and Drop Redoubt. As part of the construction of the North Lines a North Entrance was built, between the Drop Redoubt and North Centre Bastion, giving access to the Heights by way of the North Military Road.

After 1858, a further 'Detached Bastion' was built immediately to the north of the North Centre Bastion (which was itself rebuilt and strengthened), to the designs of Captain Edmund Du Cane. The bastions enabled flanking fire by both muskets and artillery along the length of the North Line. At the same time, the Citadel was extended to the west (the 'Western Outworks') with further casemated barracks provided within the new ramparts.

Also at this time, following the Royal Commission of 1859, the North and South Lines were strengthened and the North-East Line rebuilt on a different alignment, more effectively closing off that end of the site between the Drop Redoubt and the cliffs. The North Entrance was rebuilt and strengthened, necessitated by the rebuilding of the Lines. It was approached by way of a twisting path through the tenaille and lifting and falling bridges across the ditches. A new South Entrance was provided to the south, built where the South Military Road crossed a new extension to the South Lines, close to the junction with Citadel Road. Also known as Archcliffe Gate, this monumental stone gatehouse was demolished in the 1960s.

As well as helping protect the Heights from landward attack, the earthworks served to enclose a sizeable area of land (lying between the Citadel and the Redoubt, the North Lines and the escarpments to the south and east. This could accommodate a large body of troops accommodated in tents; it continued to be used for large-scale parades and assemblies of troops prior to embarkation during the First World War.

== Barracks ==
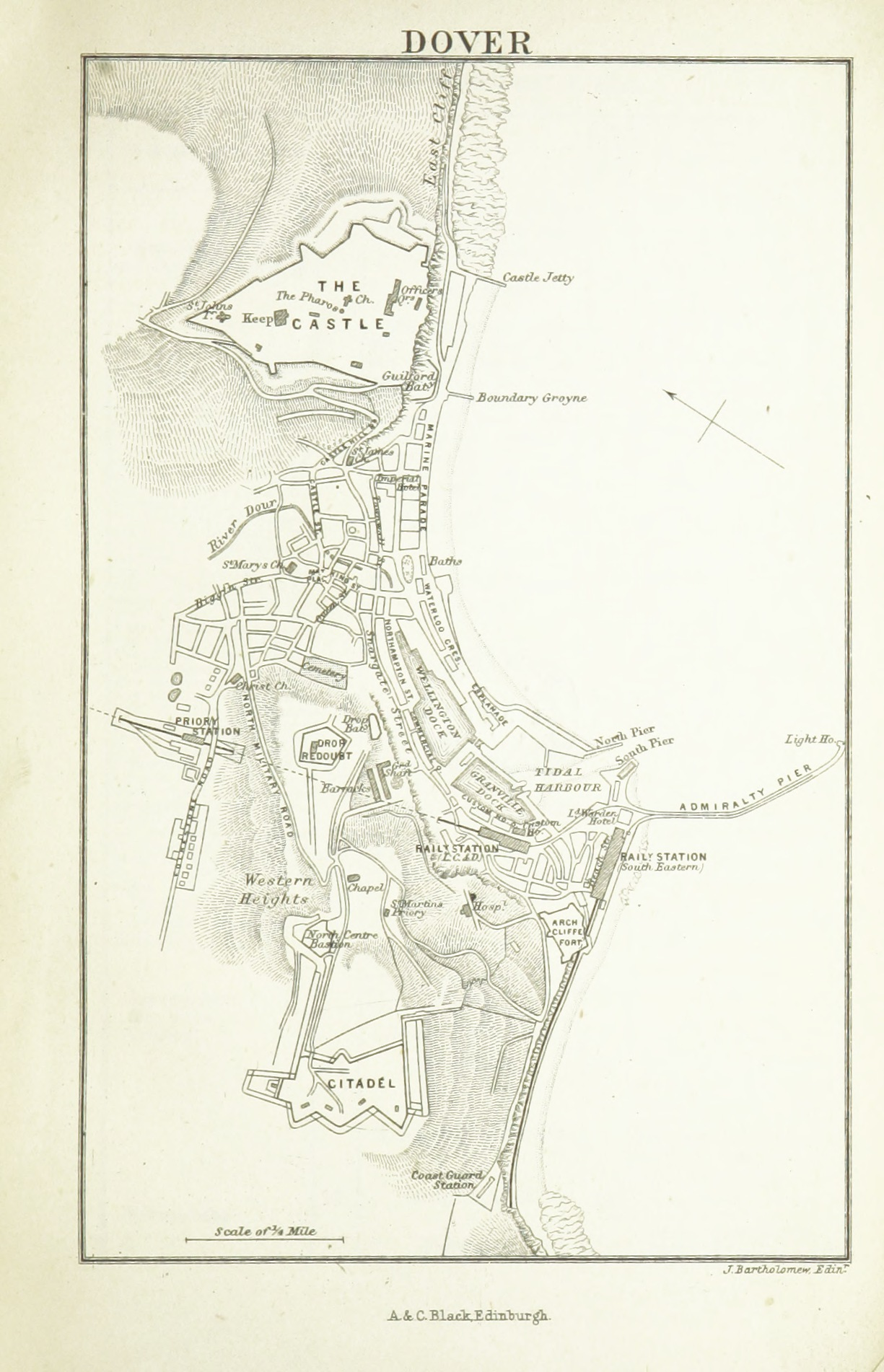
Dover in 1884: the Castle is seen at the top (i.e. to the north-east). The Western Heights is laid out below, to the west of the town and harbour.

In October 1804, to supplement the soldiers' accommodation in the casemates of the Redoubt, construction began on a separate barracks, later known as Grand Shaft Barracks, designed by Twiss to accommodate 700 men, on land between the Redoubt and the cliff to the south. Towards the cliff, the ground was levelled to create a parade ground. Behind it, stepped terraces were created in the slope up the hill for three parallel ranges of three- and four-storey barracks blocks: first (facing the parade ground) were a pair of blocks, one for soldiers, one for officers; then, on the next terrace up, was a longer block for soldiers plus a small block for Staff Sergeants; then, above that, was the Field Officers' quarters. (Further terraces beyond later accommodated a gymnasium and stables). Access to the terraces was provided by a long flight of steps rising from the far left corner of the parade ground (as viewed from the cliff top). The right-hand side of the parade ground was enclosed by the Officers' Mess, whilst a Canteen (later termed 'Regimental Institute') was built facing it, on the left-hand side; the remaining side of the parade ground was left open (providing a clear view across the harbour from the cliff top). Ancillary buildings were on further terraces above and beyond the Canteen, ranged along the left-hand side of the flight of steps. Further buildings were added in the 1860s, including additional married quarters.

Barrack accommodation on Western Heights was further increased by the building of another barracks to the south-west, South Front Barracks, in the 1860s. In contrast to the Grand Shaft Barracks, which had come to be seen as vulnerable due to technological advances in artillery, the accommodation at South Front Barracks was mainly built within bomb-proof casemates within the ditch of the southern defensive line, which was constructed at the same time above Archcliffe Fort.

Between these casemated barracks and the Citadel Road, married quarters and ancillary buildings were provided, on a series of three stepped terraces built into the hillside. The casemated barracks had accommodation for 400 soldiers and the married quarters accommodated a further 120 married soldiers with their families. While the married quarters continued to be occupied in the 20th century, by 1912 the casemates were no longer in use as barracks, serving instead as offices for the Royal Garrison Artillery.

In the 1860s, buildings were added to the west of the Grand Shaft Barracks, across the Centre Road, close to the North Gate, to serve the whole Western Heights garrison, including a Garrison Chapel and School. A Military Hospital was built to the south in 1804–06. Extended in the 1860s, it latterly served as a headquarters for the Royal Engineers. In the 1960s, these garrison buildings, and the Grand Shaft Barracks and South Front Barracks, were almost entirely demolished.

=== The Grand Shaft ===
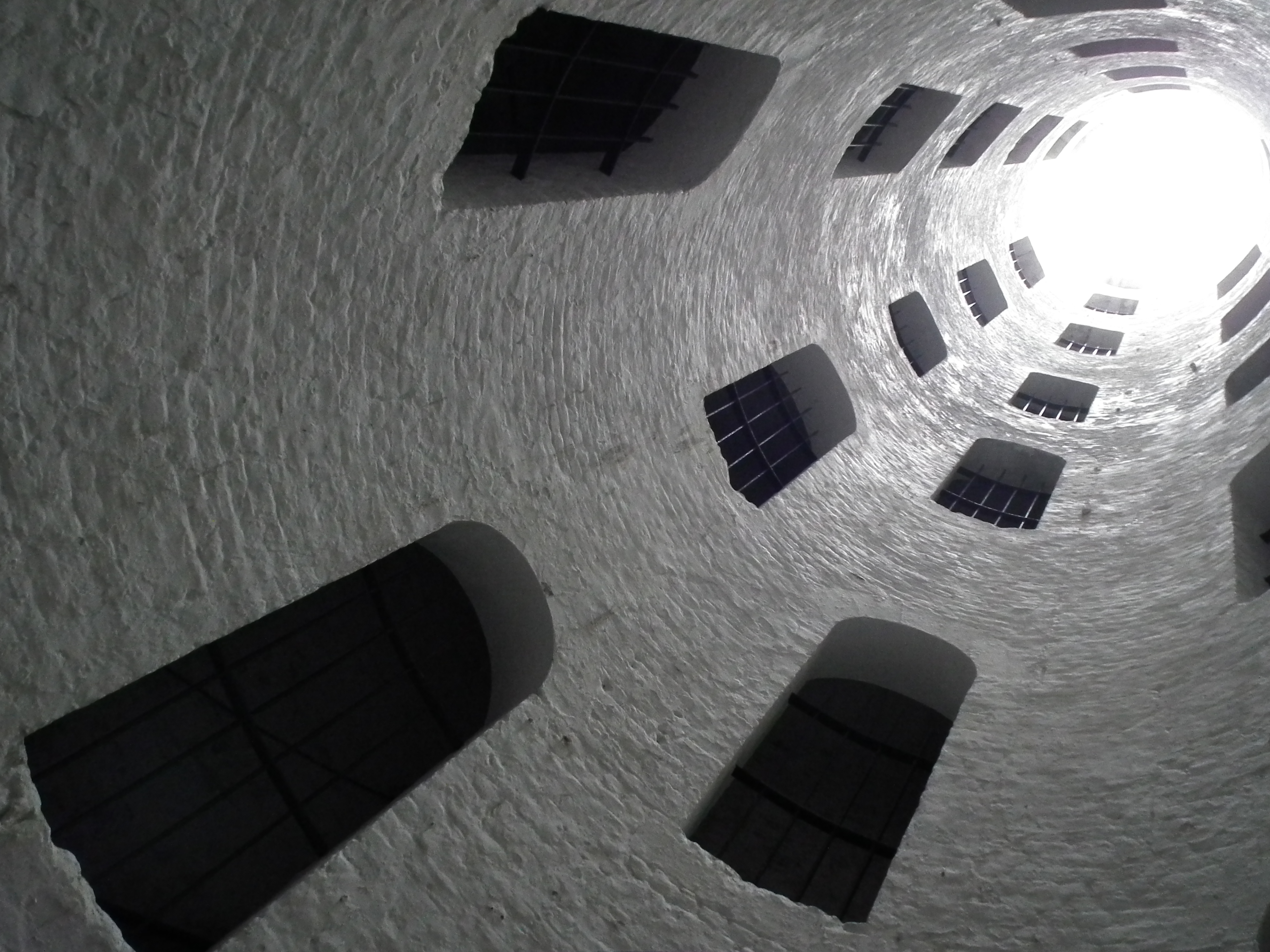
Inside the Grand Shaft

To assist with the movement of troops between the Heights and the town defences and harbour, Twiss made his case for building the Grand Shaft in the cliff, adjacent to the barracks parade ground:

‘...the new barracks.....are little more than 300 yards horizontally from the beach.....and about 180 feet (55 m) above high-water mark, but in order to communicate with them from the centre of town, on horseback the distance is nearly a mile and a half and to walk it about three-quarters of a mile, and all the roads unavoidably pass over ground more than 100 feet (30 m) above the barracks, besides the footpaths are so steep and chalky that a number of accidents will unavoidably happen during the wet weather and more especially after floods. I am therefore induced to recommend the construction of a shaft, with a triple staircase.... chief objective of which is the convenience and safety of troops....and may eventually be useful in sending reinforcements to troops or in affording them a secure retreat.’

Twiss's plan was approved and building went ahead. The resulting shaft was 26 feet (7.9 m) in diameter, 140 feet (43 m) deep with a 180-foot (55 m) gallery connecting the bottom of the shaft to Snargate Street, and all for under an estimated £4,000.

The plan entailed building two brick-lined shafts, one inside the other. In the outer would be built a triple staircase, the inner acting as a light well with ‘windows’ cut in its outer wall to illuminate the staircases. Apparently, by March 1805 only 40 feet (12 m) of the connecting gallery was left to dig and it is probable that the project was completed by 1807.

== Coast Artillery batteries ==
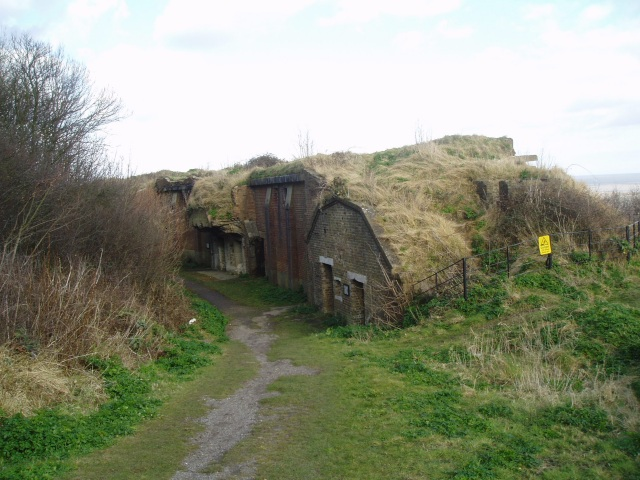
Western Heights Coastal Defence (remains of St Martin's Battery).

In the 1850s a gun battery was built, as part of Dover's coast artillery defences, on the slope below Drop Redoubt. Known as the Drop Battery, it was designed with emplacements for eight 8-inch guns. Within ten years, however, construction of the North-East Line of fortification (extending south from the Redoubt) had blocked part of the battery's field of fire.

Therefore, in the 1870s the Drop Battery was replaced by another gun battery further to the south-west: St Martin's Battery. It had three gun emplacements (designed to accommodate 10-inch RMLs) with ammunition stores in between them. In 1898 a further gun emplacement, the Citadel Battery, was built at the far end of the Western Outworks of the Citadel (the westernmost extremity of the site). It was designed for three 9.2 inch Mark X BL guns.

Another battery was built at the same time to the south (South Front Battery), but it was short-lived. By this time the guns on St Martin's Battery were obsolete and it remained out of commission until World War II, when it was re-armed with three 6-inch BL guns. The Citadel Battery remained operational until the dismantling of Britain's coast artillery network in 1956.

== Older features ==
=== The Western Pharos ===
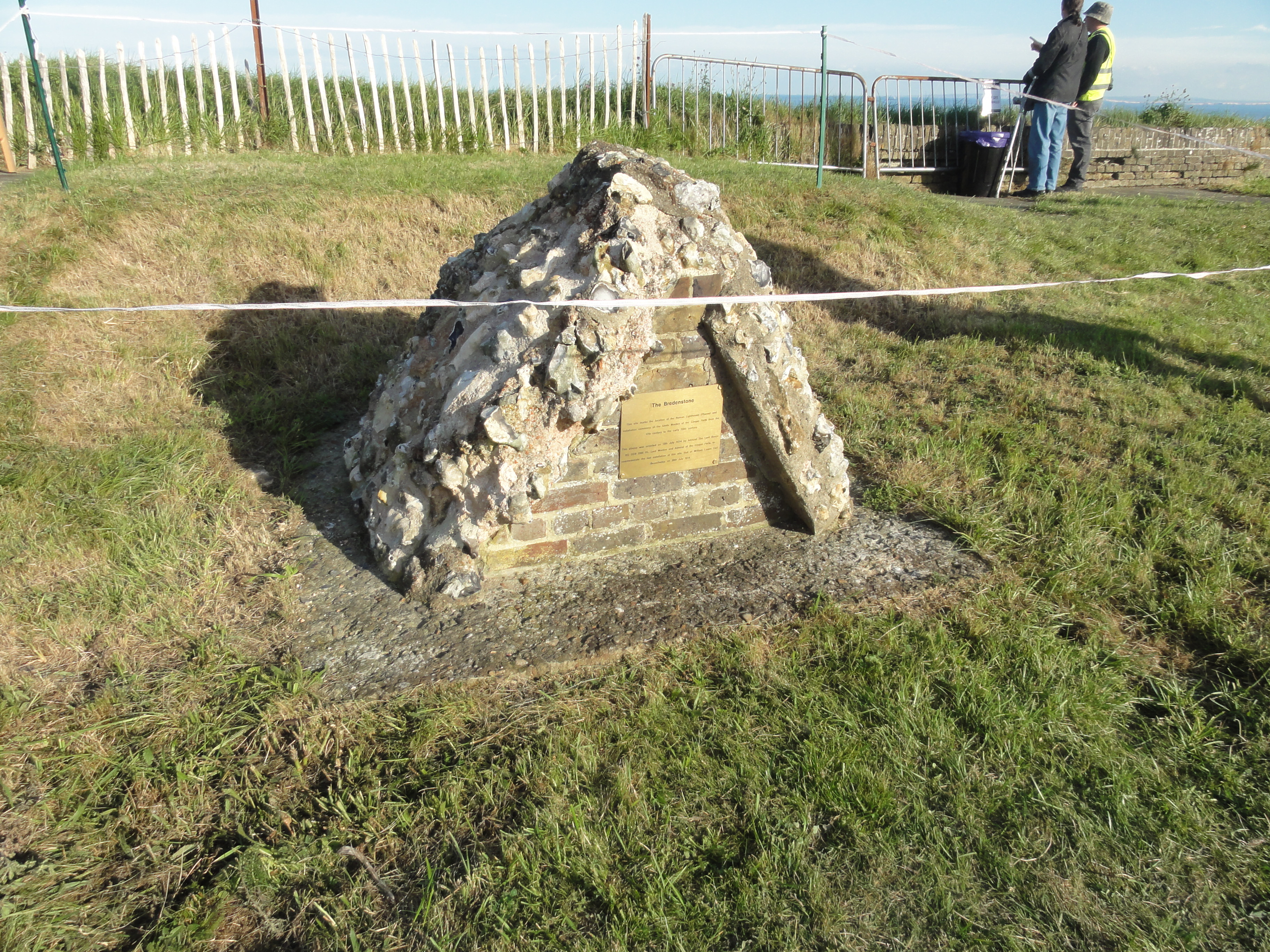
The Bredenstone

On top of the Redoubt are the remains of a Roman Pharos, or lighthouse, which complemented the one that still exists in the grounds of Dover Castle. Both date from the 2nd Century AD, and would have been similar in design lighting the cliffs either side of the Roman Port of Dubris. The remains were lost during the first period of construction, but were re-discovered during the second period and restored to their original position as a rather shapeless lump of masonry. The foundations are present in the room immediately below.

Local names for the remains of the Pharos are the ‘Bredenstone’ or the ‘Devil’s Drop of Mortar’, and it was here, until 1804, that the Lords Warden of the Cinque Ports had their installation ceremony. It is likely that the name ‘Drop Redoubt’ originates from the local name given to the ruins of the Pharos.

=== Knights Templar Church ===
Between The Citadel and Drop Redoubt are the ruins of an 11th-century church with a round nave.

== Today ==
Today, much of the site is open as a country park. The barracks have been demolished.

The Citadel, formerly a young offenders' institution, was most recently used as the Dover Immigration Removal Centre, and so was off-limits until at least November 2015 when the centre was closed down. Many of the Citadel's original buildings remain preserved within. In 2018, the freehold site was put up for sale.

English Heritage owns the Redoubt. The Grand Shaft spiral staircase is owned by the council, and is annually opened by the Western Heights Preservation Society.

The Grand Shaft Bowl, located south of Drop Redoubt, is the proposed location for the new National War Memorial, which will commemorate, by name, all of the British Commonwealth casualties of World War I and World War II.

The Grand Shaft Barracks was the location for the filming of the post-nuclear attack scenes in the Peter Watkins 1965 film The War Game.

== See also ==
- Eastbourne Redoubt
- Dover Castle
