= Dover Immigration Removal Centre =

Immigration detention centre in Dover, England

Coordinates: 51°7′3″N 1°17′48″E

IRC Dover
- Interactive map of IRC Dover
- Location: Dover, Kent
- Security class: Immigration Removal Centre
- Opened: 1952
- Closed: 2015
- Managed by: HM Prison Services
- Website: Dover Immigration Removal Centre at justice.gov.uk

Dover Immigration Removal Centre (formerly known as Dover Prison) was an immigration detention centre, located in the historic citadel of the Western Heights fortifications in Dover, England. The centre was operated by Her Majesty's Prison Service, and formally closed in November 2015. Dover has been designated as an historic site by English Heritage.

== History ==
The Western Heights of Dover are one of the most impressive fortifications in Britain. They comprise a series of forts, strong points and ditches, designed to protect the country from invasion. They were created to augment the existing defences and protect the key port of Dover from both seaward and landward attack. There have been fortifications here since Roman times, but fortifications built for defense from the French in the days of Napoleon house the buildings there today.

The Prison Service took over the site from the British Army in 1952 when work began on converting the fortress into a prison. In 1957, the prison was converted into a Borstal, also operating as a Young Offenders Institution until April 2002, when Detention Centre Rules 2001 converted it into an Immigration Removal Centre.

The site then held male adult detainees aged 18 and over who were appealing for asylum or had failed in seeking it. The centre offered residential space with integral sanitation as well as resources such as televisions and telephones. It provided shared resources including gym, a library, church, mosques, multi-faith rooms, shops, laundry facilities, and a healthcare unit.

In October 2015 the Home Office announced that the centre would close by the end of the month, with all remaining detainees being transferred to other removal centres. The site was then passed over to the Ministry of Justice.
