= Archcliffe Fort =

Former military installation in Dover, UK

Coordinates: 51°6′54″N 1°18′26″E

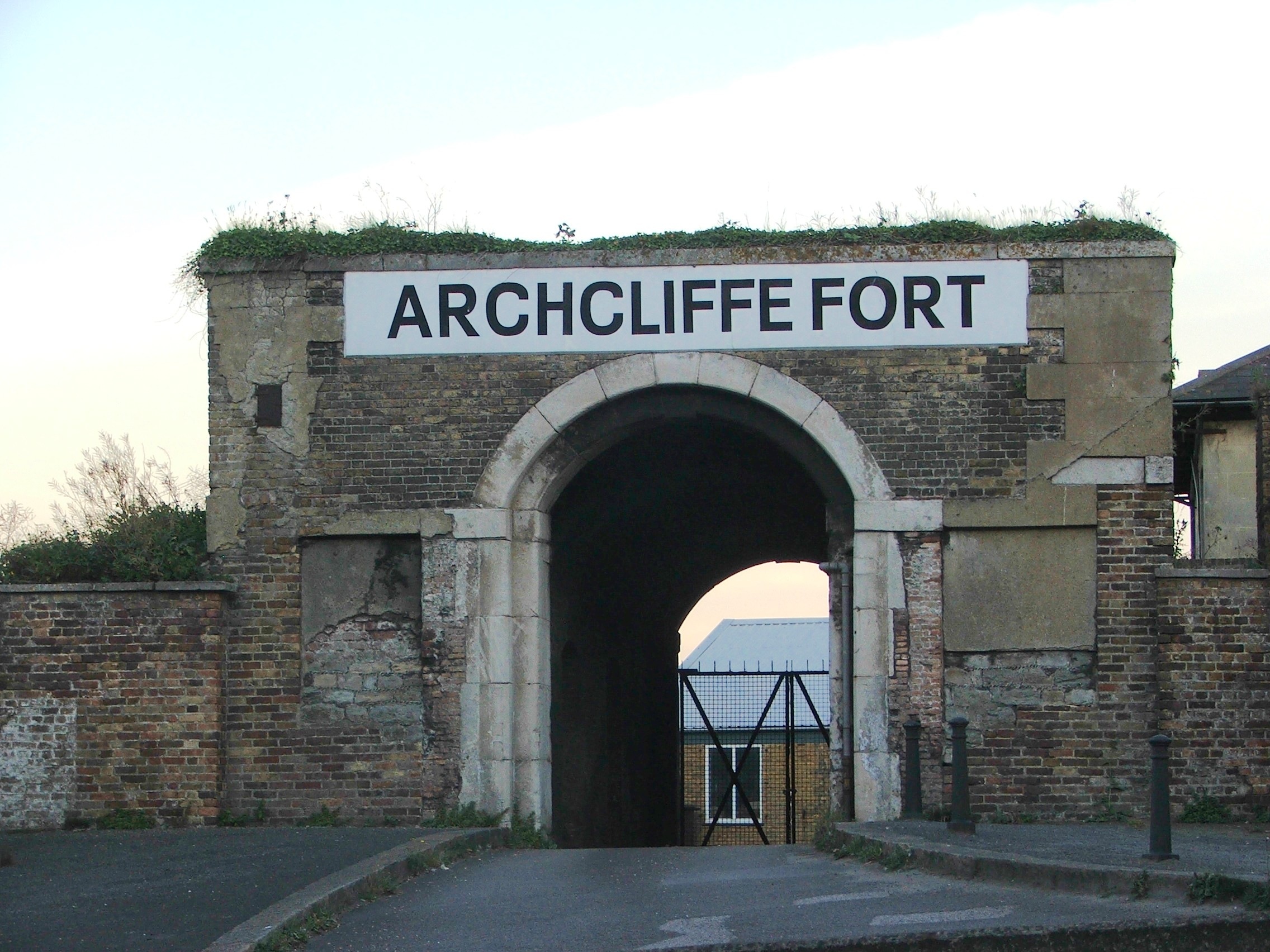
Fort entrance in 2015

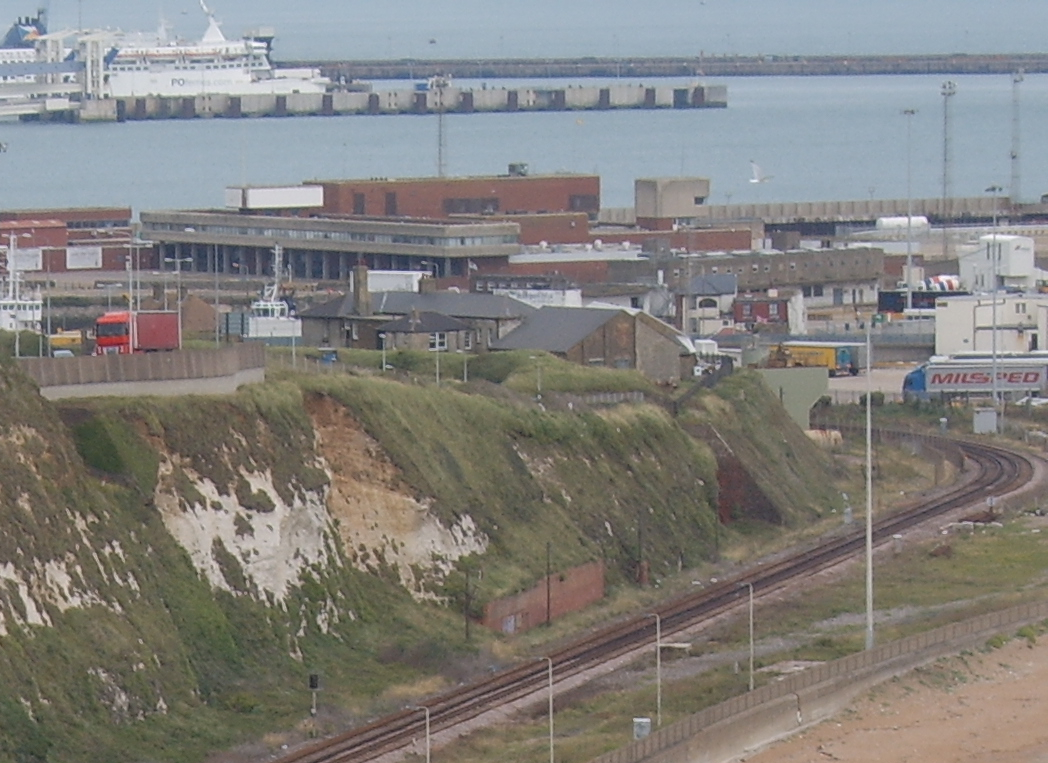
The modern buildings of the fort (centre) sandwiched between the A20 road (left) and South Coast Mainline (right). Shakespeare Beach is visible at bottom and the Port of Dover in the background.

Archcliffe Fort is a former military installation in Dover, England. It is situated at the base of the Dover Western Heights and overlooks the approaches to the port of Dover. A watchtower was erected on the site in 1370 but this was replaced with a more substantial fort by Henry VIII by 1539. The fort fell into disrepair but was renovated in 1588 due to concerns over the Spanish Armada. The Stuart kings James VI and I and Charles I made improvements to the fort and it was heavily garrisoned by Charles II in the aftermath of the 1660 Stuart Restoration. Invasion scares during the long eighteenth century saw further improvements to the defences.

The fort was manned during the First World War but in the 1920s much of it was demolished to allow for improvements to be made to the South Eastern Main Line railway. The fort was deemed obsolete by the time of the Second World War and was decommissioned in 1956, after which further demolition took place to widen the A20 road. The surviving structure includes two ramparts and two complete corner bastions, together with some modern buildings in the interior. The fort is used by the Emmaus Community to house formerly homeless people and operates a furniture workshop and retail centre.

== Early history ==
The site sits at the base of the Dover Western Heights and overlooks Shakespeare Beach and the approaches to the port of Dover. Worked flint dating to the Neolithic and Bronze Age periods has been found here as well as pottery dating from the 12th to 14th centuries. In 1370 a watchtower was erected on the site. No traces of the structure remain but plans from the period show a pentagon-shaped building in the approximate location of the current western bastion. The plans show that the watchtower was connected by a ditch to a gatehouse located in the vicinity of the current eastern bastion.

== Tudor period ==
In 1534 Henry VIII's parliament passed the Act of Supremacy, bringing the Church of England under his control and breaking with the Catholic Church. This led to fears of a Catholic-led invasion of England. Henry began constructing Device Forts to protect his lands including, by 1539, new fortifications at Dover. The existing watchtower at Archcliffe was demolished and a new fort erected. Archcliffe Fort was a rectangular, timber-revetted earth structure enclosing a gunner's house and a number of other buildings.

Archcliffe Fort covered the western side of the harbour with Moat's Bulwark near Dover Castle erected to cover the east and Wyke Bulwark cut into the cliff itself to protect the pier (this fortification fell into disuse by 1568). The new fortifications were intended to destroy any invading force with cannonfire while it was still at sea or in the process of landing.

Archcliffe Fort was equipped with a demi-culverin, two brass sakers, an iron fowler, three serpentines and a dozen bases. It had a permanent staff of a captain and two soldiers, intended to be augmented with additional troops in times of war. After the threat of invasion receded the fort and its guns fell into disrepair until 1588 when Elizabeth I carried out restoration works in response to the threat of the Spanish Armada.

== 17th to 19th centuries ==
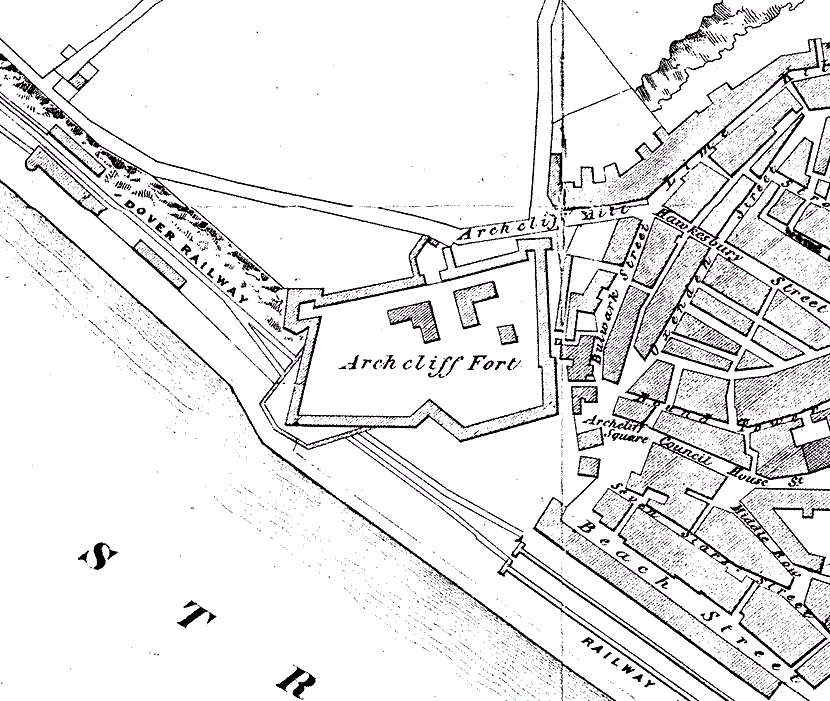
Archcliffe fort from an 1844 map of Dover. The fort is shown at its greatest extent including the now demolished barbican and sea-facing ramparts. The railway runs in a tunnel beneath the fort.

Dover was an important embarkation point for English troops involved in the Eighty Years' War in continental Europe and in the early 17th century James VI and I (r. 1603–1625) ordered repairs made to Archcliffe Fort to improve the port's defences. James' successor Charles I (r. 1624–1649) ordered the cliff below the fort to be steepened to make it more difficult for an attacker to scale. In 1639 the fort was completely rebuilt at a cost of £4,300 (equivalent to £853,102 in 2025). Further works were carried out in 1641 which saw the fort encircled with a 7-foot (2.1 m) deep and 18-foot (5.5 m) wide ditch and a 20-foot (6.1 m) high perimeter rampart. The wall was poorly constructed and repairs were required within 12 months of it being erected.

The fort escaped damage during the English Civil War and in the aftermath of the Stuart Restoration was manned by a captain, a lieutenant, an ensign, a sergeant, two corporals, one drummer, one gunner, two assistant gunners and sixty soldiers. As Charles II (r. 1660–1685) became more secure in his rule the garrison was reduced to two officers and four gunners. As the south-east of the country was ravaged by the Great Plague of 1666 the garrison lit fires, fired cannons and rang bells as precautions against disease. Further repairs were carried out to the walls and gun platforms towards the end of the 17th century when the fort housed 13 iron cannon.

Invasion scares during the mid-18th century saw the fort reinforced, with a barracks and two guard houses being erected in 1745. A parapet was installed to the ramparts in 1755, with surviving sections showing examples of firing steps. Further barracks were erected in 1757 but by 1793, when the 1st Devon Militia were posted to the fort, complaints were being made that the barracks had been almost entirely taken over by the Board of Ordnance and there was insufficient space for any infantrymen. The fort was damaged in 1794 during an explosion while testing was being carried out on some cannons destined for a naval cutter. The Napoleonic Wars with France (1803–1815) saw the entrance remodelled between 1807 and 1809 and a brick-built barbican was installed in front of the entrance between 1814 and 1815. In 1872 the seaward defences were modified to accommodate five RML 10-inch 18-ton guns.

== 20th and 21st centuries ==
On 4 August 1914 Britain declared war on Germany and entered the First World War. That day the Royal Navy captured the German merchant vessels Franz Horn and Perkeo in the English Channel; their crews were brought that day to Archcliffe Fort. During the early part of the war the fort was manned by the Kent Fencibles (the local arm of the Volunteer Training Corps), later in the war it was manned by two non-commissioned officers and nine privates of the 1st Volunteer Battalion of the Buffs (Royal East Kent Regiment) (part of the Volunteer Training Corps) and by the 3rd Fortress Company of the Royal Engineers. During the course of the war quick-firing artillery was installed, intended to be used against enemy troops who might seek to shelter at the cliff face beneath the fort.

In the 1920s the southern and eastern portions of the fort were demolished to allow for improvements to the South Eastern Main Line which previously passed beneath the structure in a tunnel; the fort was left with only two ramparts and two complete corner bastions (partial remains of a third survive) from the 17th-century layout. By the time of the 1939–1945 Second World War the fort was deemed obsolete as a defensive structure and a new vehicle entrance was cut through the northern rampart, to the east of the entrance gate. After the war the fort was home to the Dover Sea Cadets and also to the first memorial to the Dover Patrol, a wooden tablet. Both the cadets and the memorial left the site in the 1970s. The fort was decommissioned as a military installation in 1956. Soon afterwards the entrance barbican and counterscarp of the northern ditch were demolished to facilitate widening of the A20 road; remnants of three entrance bridge structures were found during the works. In 2002 a possible passage to a 19th-century sally port and the remains of a mediaeval column were found during excavation of a pit. In 2012 the remains of a 17th-century structure were found during excavation of a trench near the gateway. The site is designated as a scheduled monument, except for the modern buildings in its interior and security fencing.

The fort is now used by the Emmaus Community, a charity that provides accommodation and work for homeless people. By 2021 the site provided housing to 27 formerly homeless people and a place for the charity to recycle and sell furniture. In August 2024 the charity unveiled a plaque at the site for four soldiers killed clearing mines from the town's beaches in 1944–45.

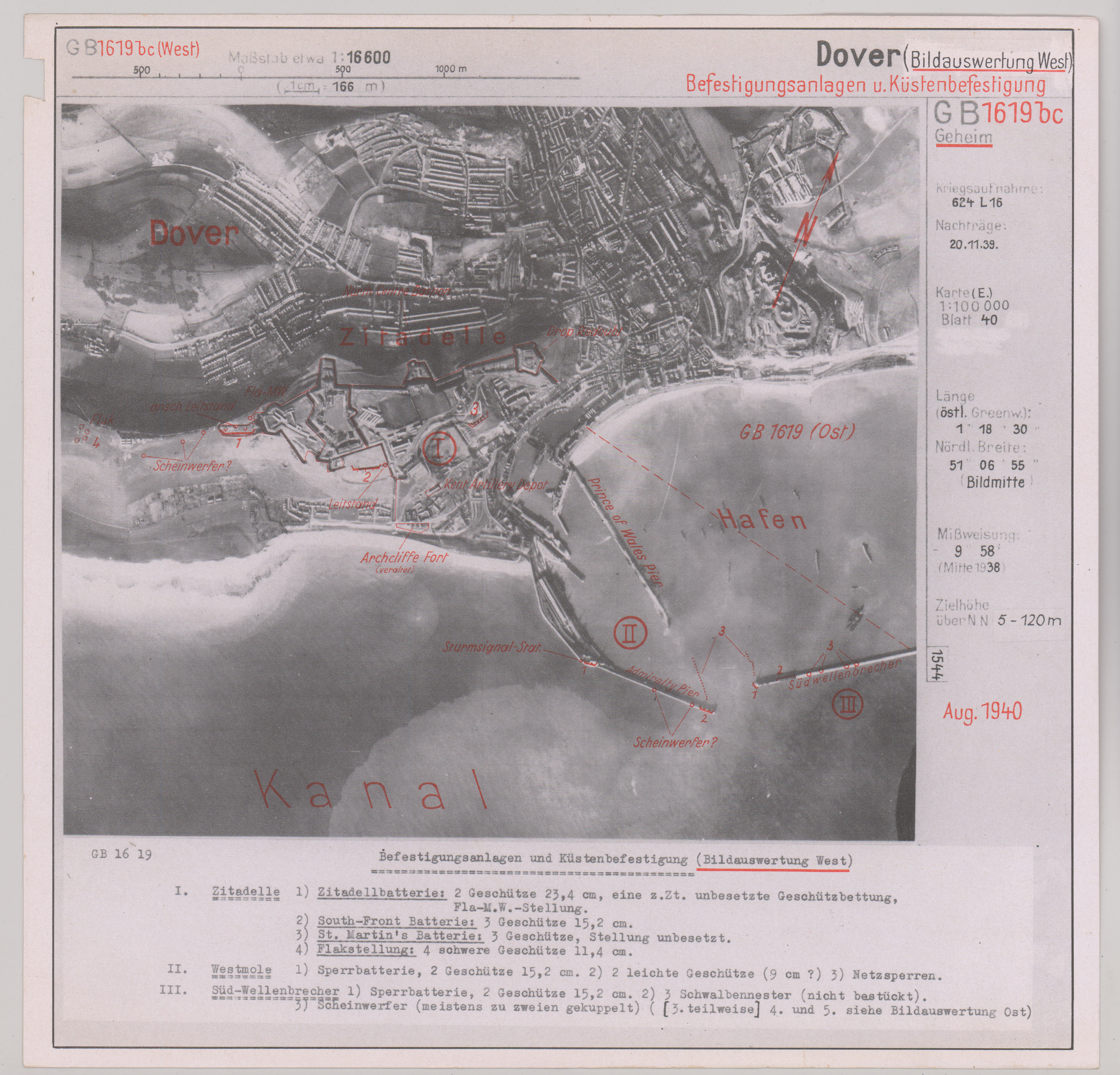
A 1940 Luftwaffe targeting dossier with Archcliffe Fort marked at centre-left as "veraltet" ("obsolete")

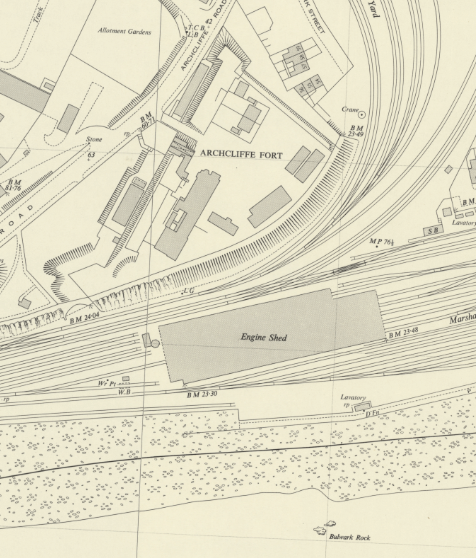
Mid-20th-century OS map of Archcliffe Fort, showing the railway cutting through the south and eastern portions and, at bottom, the beach and sea
