= History of Dover =

The History of Dover, because of the town's proximity to the Continent begins when Stone Age people crossed what was then a land bridge, before the opening up of the English Channel. Since then, successive invasions of peoples have taken place. Archaeological finds have revealed a great deal, particularly about cross channel trade and the attempts of those various inhabitants to build large-scale defences against European invaders on this part of the English coast.

In more modern times the emphasis has tended to be on the growth of Dover as a commercial port, both for passenger and freight ferries and for cruise ships. There is also a relatively large tourist industry built around the town's historical sites.

== Earliest inhabitants ==
The earliest archaeological evidence in the River Dour valley can be seen in finds of Neolithic flint implements and pottery, especially in the Market Square of the town; and the site is considered to be one of the major areas of settlement in Kent. These settlers arrived by crossing the pre-English Channel by what is termed the ‘'land bridge'’. Most such settlements occur in river valleys (see also the River Medway at Kit's Coty House). The Neolithic occupation of the Dour Valley appears to have occurred following significant environmental change

Once the bridge had been broken, later settlers had to arrive by sea, and their artefacts reveal the earliest evidence that Dover was becoming a place of trade with the Continent and Ireland. The so-called Beaker Folk were here; and later Bronze Age peoples traded in gold: one such find has been found near Dover. In addition two other finds of great importance in Dover's history are now displayed in Dover Museum: a boat and a hoard of axes, the latter discovered in Langdon Bay, off Dover. A Bronze Age ring-ditch has also been found at the nearby settlement of Martin. Small Iron Age finds have also been discovered.

== Roman Dover and after ==
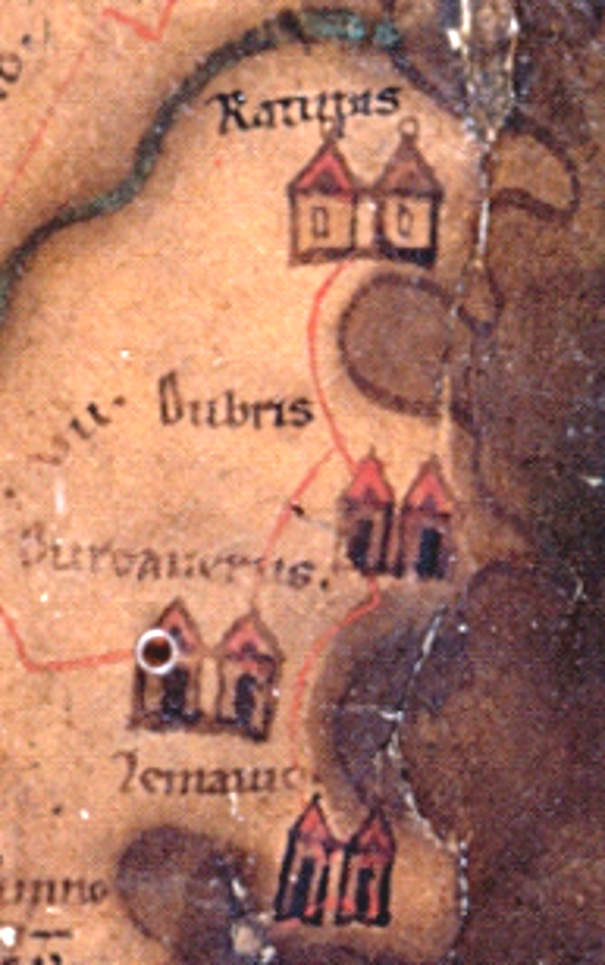
Roman Canterbury, Richborough, Dover and Lympne on the Peutinger Map.

From now on the history of Dover is completely one with the sea. Roman Dover, or Portus Dubris as it was called, was one of the three ports used for trade and the movement of the army; the other two being Lemanis Lympne and Rutupiae Richborough. All three connected to Watling Street at Canterbury. In due course the longshore drift along the coast silted up the latter two ports, and also the mouth of the River Dour, Kent on which Dover stands.

The Romans, for whom the port was a base for their navy, the Classis Britannica, constructed breakwaters against the sea's depredations, and added two lighthouses on the heights either side of the estuary. It is possible that they also constructed a fort on what is now the site of Dover Castle to protect the port.

Dover became one of the three important towns in Kent, after Canterbury (Durovernum) and Rochester (Durobrivae). Evidence that is in an extremely well preserved Roman mansion.

After the departure of the Romans came the Jutes, who left behind the legacy of the establishment of the Kingdom of Kent; from which followed the establishment of Christianity in Kent. The story of Dover Castle may well have begun during the Anglo-Saxon period. By the time of the Viking Danish invasions of Kent in 850, Dover was a principal town and Dover Priory had been established in the early 7th century.

In about 1050 five ports on the south coast of Britain joined to form the Cinque Ports, in order to provide ships and men for the king on fifteen days a year: Dover being one of them.

== The Middle Ages ==
Twenty years after the Norman conquest of England, in 1086, the Domesday Book was compiled. The entry for Dover in the Kent section of the Book came first, before all other entries; there were also two entries specifically to the lands held by the Canons of Dover Priory. The value of Dover was put at £40; its value in the time of Edward the Confessor could not be established, since Dover had been burnt at the time of the Conquest. The town was now a borough; the town burgesses ran their own guild and possessed a guildhall.

Soon after 1066, William appointed a Governor (also known as the Constable) of Dover Castle, who was given the additional title of Lord Warden of the Cinque Ports.

The period saw much activity in the founding of churches, hospitals and other religious buildings. Archaeological evidence suggests that a new castle was constructed near the Saxon church of St Mary in Castro in what is now Dover Castle, rather than or as well as repairing the old burgh. The church was repaired twice in the 13th century.

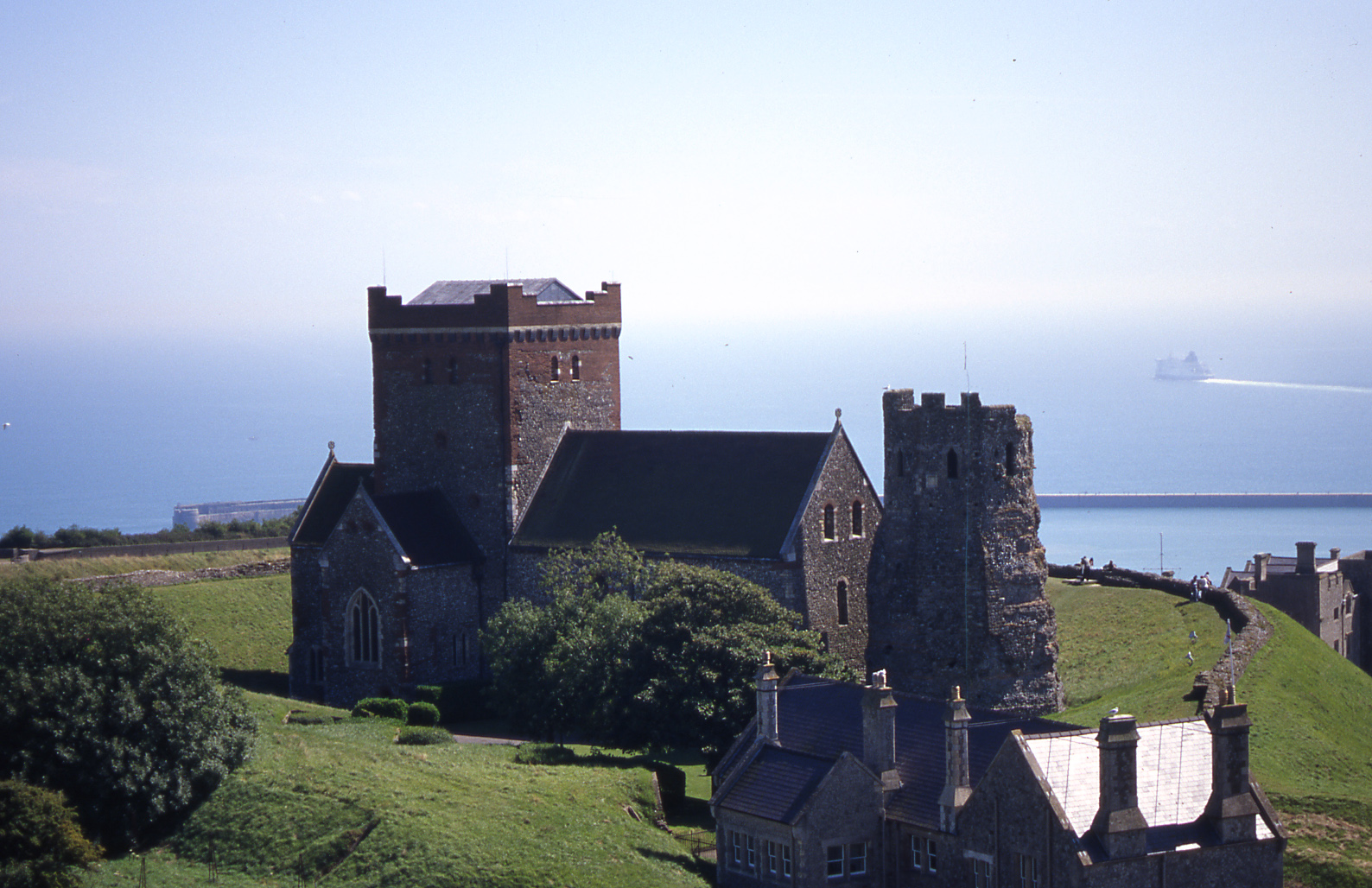
Church of St Mary del Castro

In Dover the churches of St Mary the Virgin and of St. James the Apostle were also built.

St Edmund's Chapel was consecrated in 1253 as a chapel of rest; The large Saxon monastic church of St Martin le Grand, had by this time incorporated three other churches within its walls, although by the time of the Reformation it was closed down. A new Priory was founded on another site, also dedicated to St. Martin; and a college for secular priests was established. Hospitals were built for the relief of pilgrims: there were five in Dover, including Maison Dieu. Several of the surviving buildings remain in 2008, either as ruins or in another guise.

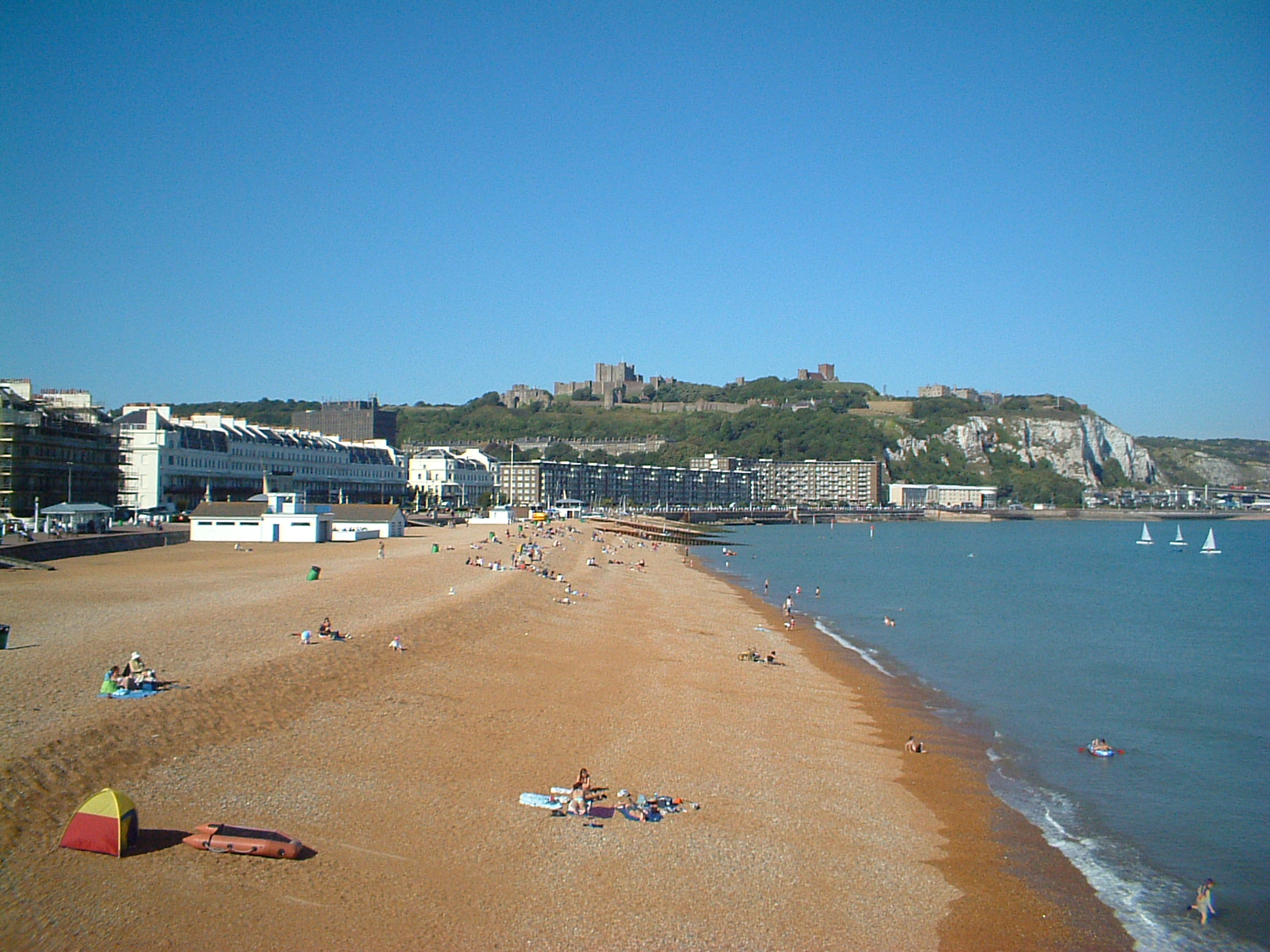
Dover seafront, with the castle overlooking the beach and the valley of the River Dour, behind the line of buildings

A great deal of Saxon Dover was rebuilt. By 1190 the new Dover Castle was complete, and maritime trade was increasing, even though the port itself was small and remained so for some centuries. In the 13th century, Dover withstood two attacks. The first, in 1216, involved the siege of Dover Castle by Prince Louis of France and was almost successful; in 1295 a French raiding party overran the town and set most of the town ablaze.

== 16th to 18th centuries ==
During the Tudor dynasty, continental invasion still threatened. During the reign of Henry VIII improvements were made to Dover's defences, both to the castle and the Moat Bulwark; the king making a personal visit to supervise the work. Further improvements were carried out under Elizabeth I.

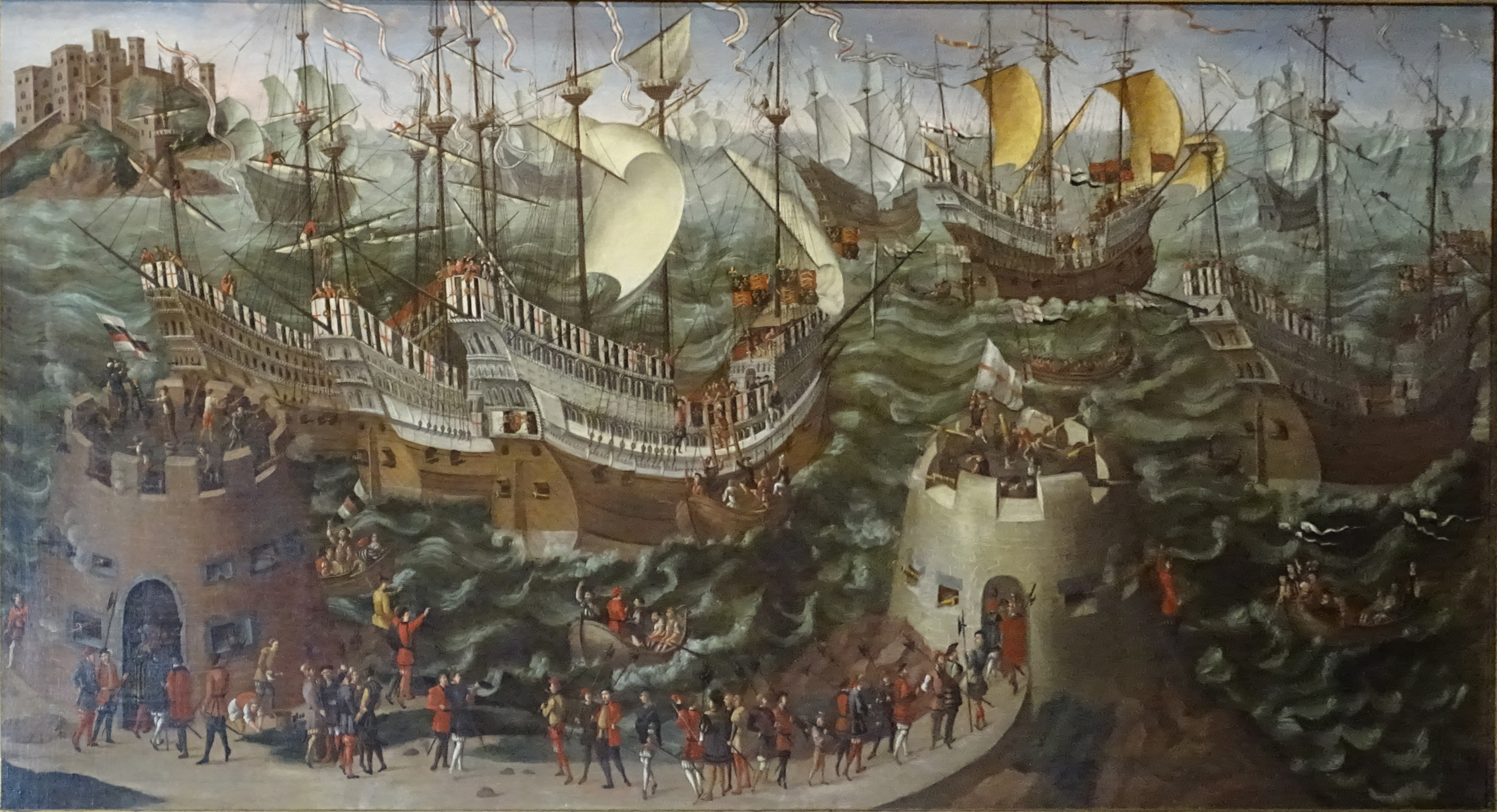
Depiction of Henry VIII embarking at Dover, c. 1520

The Dover Straits earthquake of 1580, possibly the largest ever recorded in England, caused a great deal of devastation.

During the Civil War (1642–1651) Dover declared for the king but was captured by the Parliamentarians without a siege in 1648. Charles II landed here in 1660 at the restoration, deputizing Bernard de Gomme to make extensive repairs to the pier. On 26 May 1670, Charles II signed a secret treaty here ending the hostilities with Louis XIV of France.

During the Napoleonic Wars Dover became a garrison town heavily defended against the threat of French invasion. Napoleon's troops, gathered at Boulogne, could be seen from Dover on a clear day.

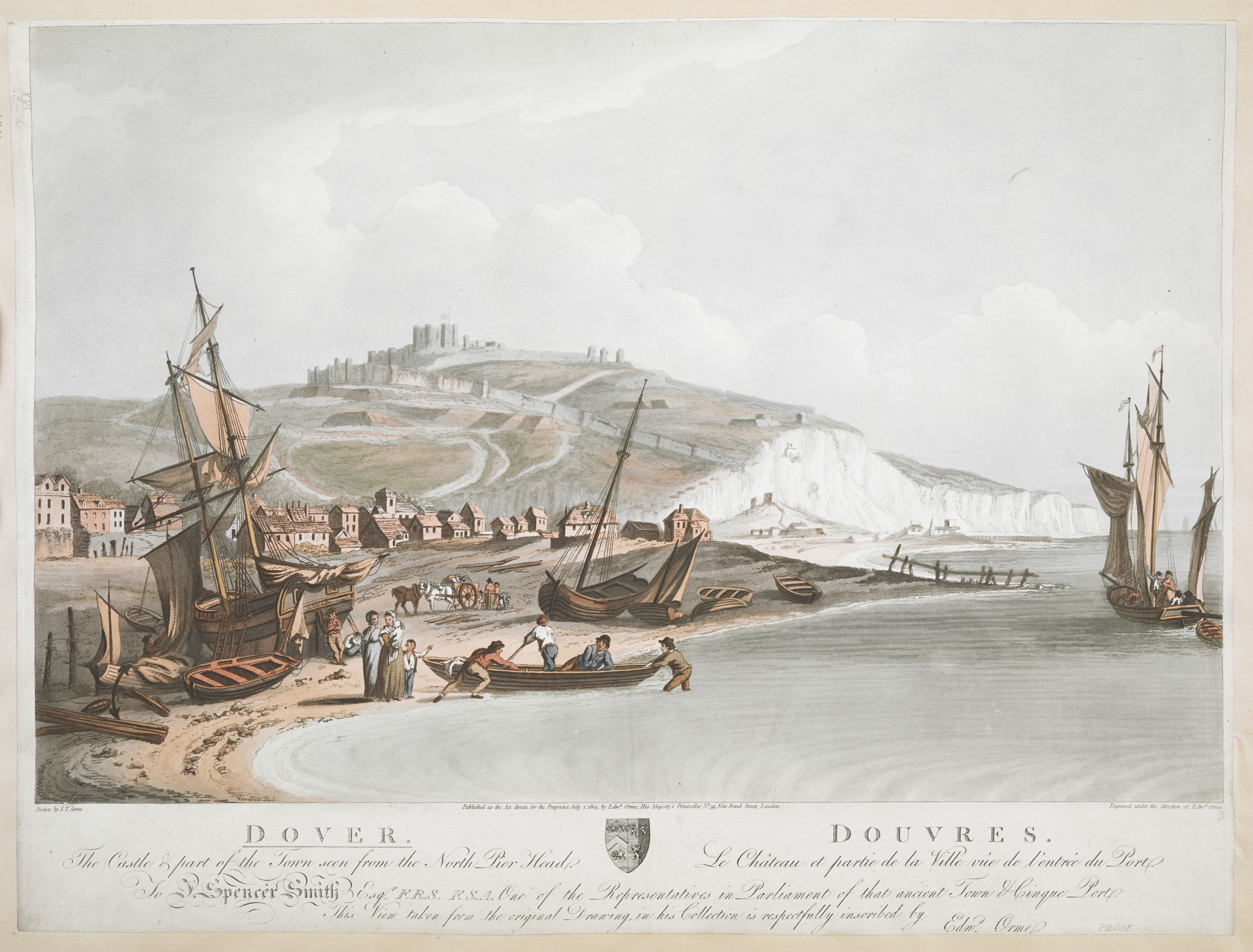
View of Dover, c. 1803

At first earthen batteries were built along the seafront and across the Western Heights (to supplement the medieval castle, which had been superseded by developments in military technology and artillery). These were later improved in 1804 with a massive building programme in stone and brick on the Western Heights, creating two cutting-edge forts, deep brick-lined ditches, and the Grand Shaft, a unique 140 ft (43 m) triple staircase, linking the town to the forts and enabling troops from the hilltop barracks to be rapidly deployed at the seafront.

== 19th century ==
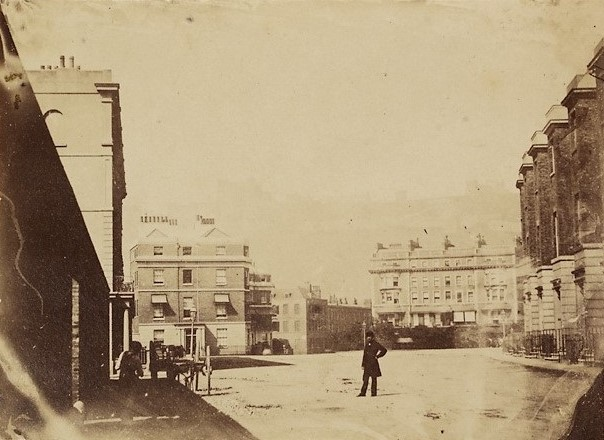
Photograph of a Dover street scene, c.1860

Between 1801 and 1901 the population increased by 600 percent. The harbour was finally rebuilt as a set of artificial moles, and the town tried to become a seaside resort by building a pleasure pier, ice rink, bathing machines and impressive seafront crescents of hotels and apartments. The South Eastern Railway arrived in 1844 and cross-channel traffic boomed – the town were even combined with boat trains and the Golden Arrow service.

== 20th century ==
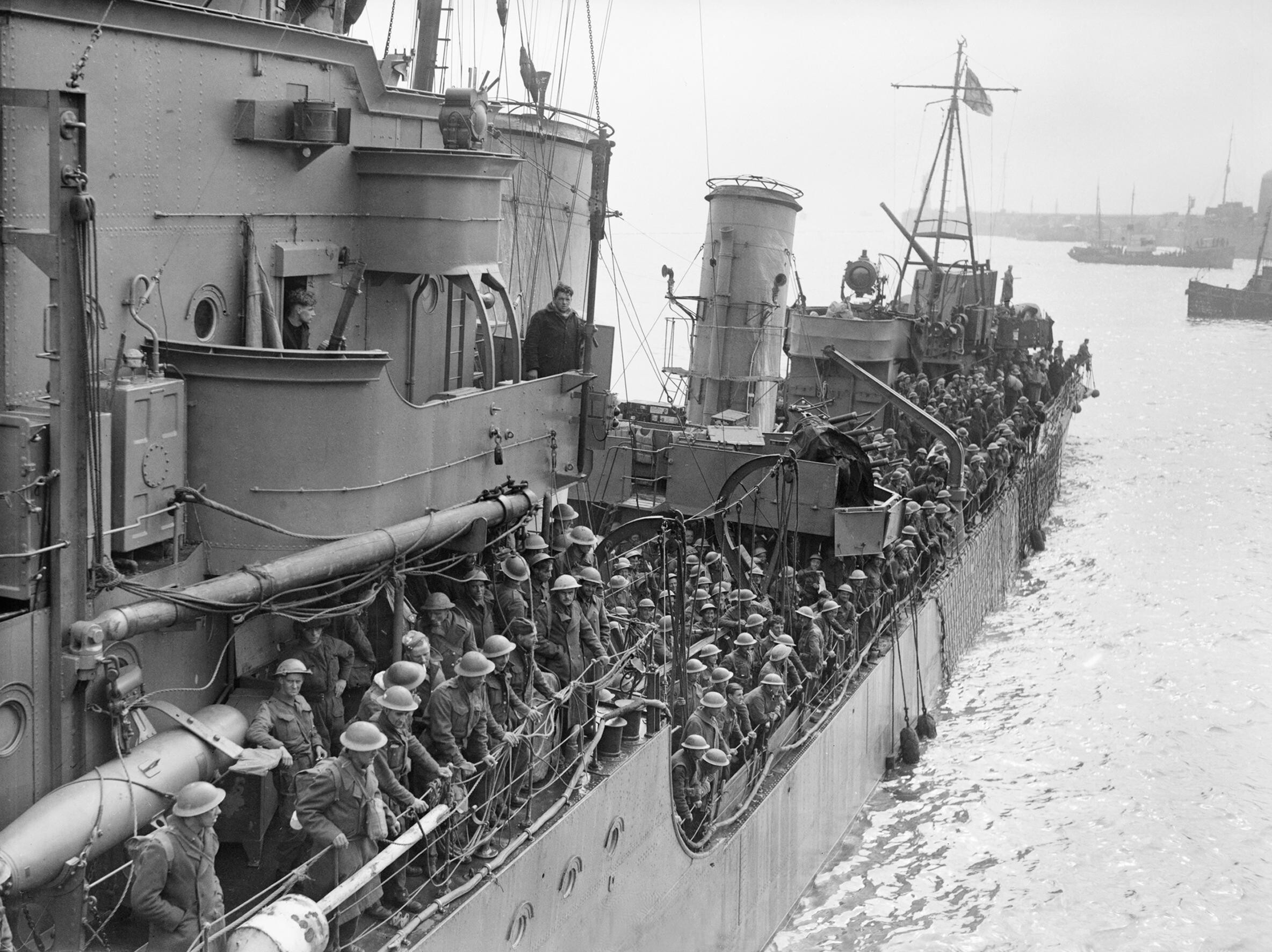
Troops evacuated from Dunkirk on a destroyer about to berth at Dover, 31 May 1940

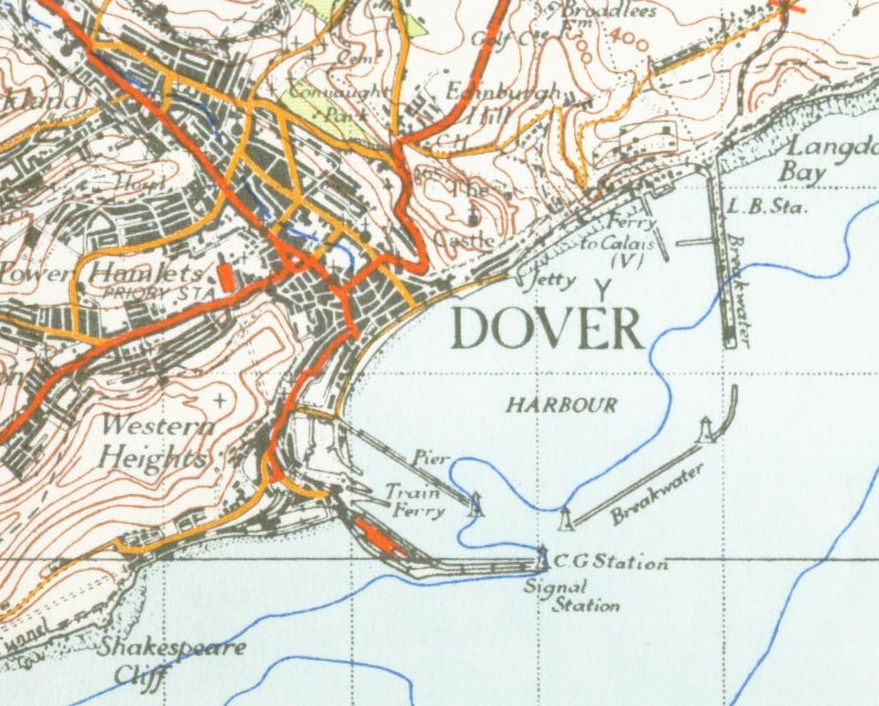
A Map of Dover from 1945

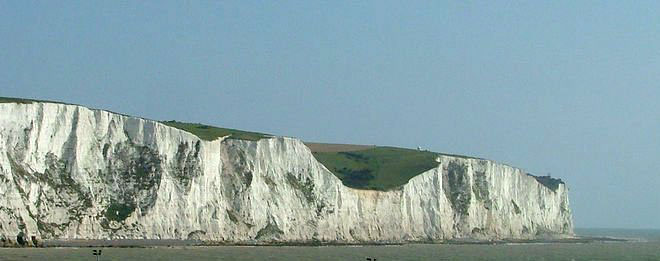
The white cliffs of Dover

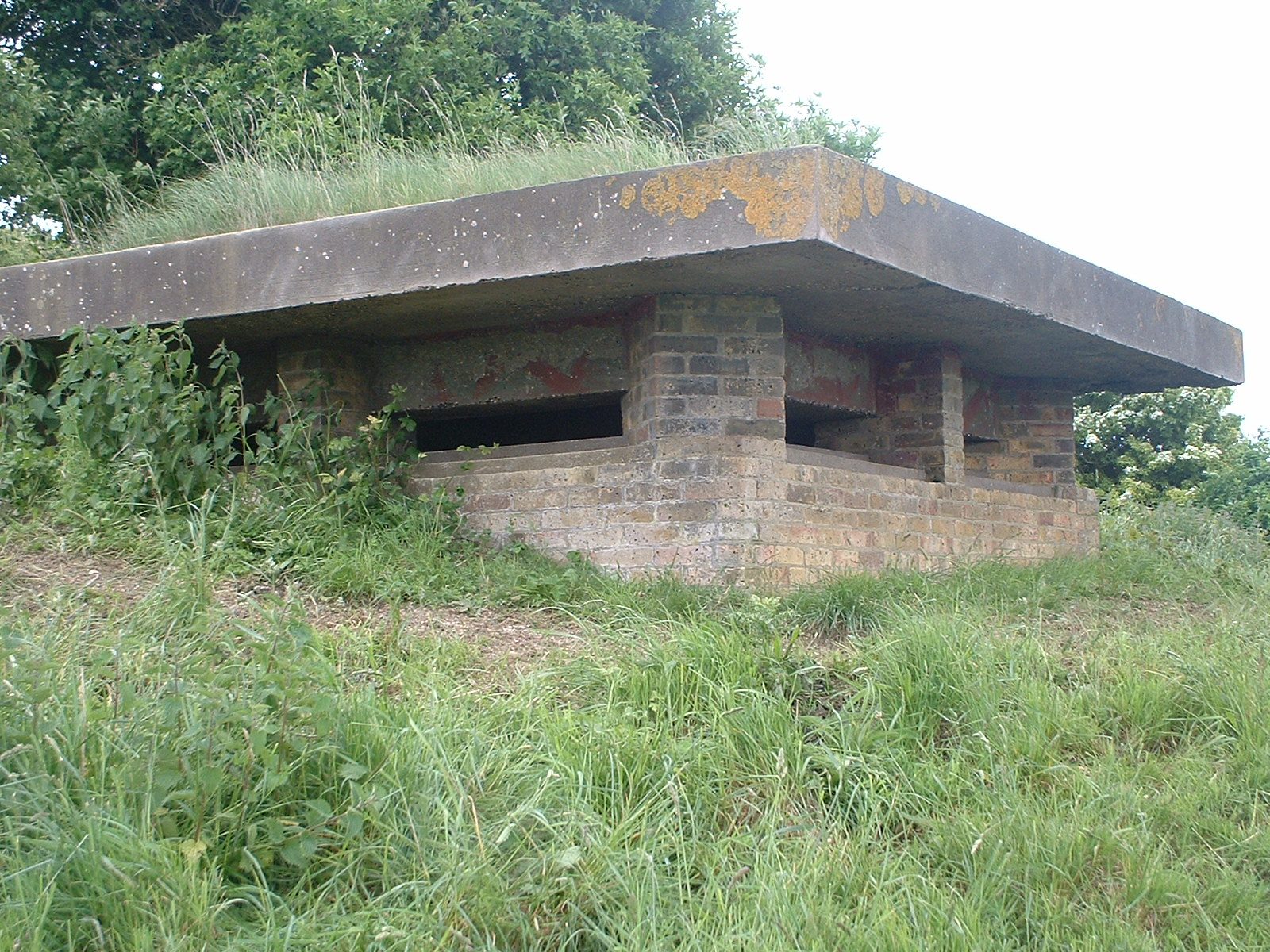
Dover Quad type pillbox on the Western Heights

In the 20th century Dover became the centre of English Channel defence during World War I, as the base for the Dover Patrol.

In World War I it was, with Folkestone, one of the main troop embarkation ports for France. It was also bombed by aeroplanes and zeppelins (the first bomb to be dropped on England fell near Dover Castle on Christmas Eve 1914) and shelled by passing warships. This forced residents to shelter in caves and dug-outs. The town became known as 'Fortress Dover'.

=== World War II ===
In World War II this developed into sustained bombing and shelling by cross-channel guns, causing 3,059 alerts, killing 216 civilians, and damaging 10,056 premises. A series of caves and tunnels in the cliffs were used as air-raid shelters (and as a military base, coordinating Operation Dynamo, whose ships landed at Dover) during the war and Dover became a wartime symbol as part of East Kent's Hellfire Corner.

2,200 shells were fired into the borough, with 464 bombs, and 3 parachute mines. Around half of injuries were killed from shelling or bombs. It was the first shell that killed the most, before the warning was given. 107 people were killed by shelling. The worst shelling was on Tuesday 26 September 1944, with 63 shells, and a hostel was destroyed, which killed 49 people.

Defences were constructed as a part of anti-invasion preparations. The defences included a large number of pillboxes, trenchworks, and minefields.

=== Industry ===
Dover was once a hive of industry, although much of it was on a small scale. The river Dour, flowing faster in years gone by, provided the power for industry including mills, foundries and breweries. Some work centres were destroyed by fire but most closed as a result of amalgamation and takeovers by out-of-town interests. Others just failed as a result of increased competition.

Notable industries that held significant importance in Dover during their operational years include the 1840s mustard factory at Biggin Street (owned by John and Flavius Kingsford), the coffee and spice grinding factory on the same site (owned by Richard Gay), the oil mill in Limekin Street, built backing onto the cliff face, which represented one of Dover's biggest industries, and stood for many years as a landmark of Dover (previously the Peter Becker's steam-powered corn mill ) run by the Dover Oil Crushing Company until 1889. The building of the oil mill was used as a pre-demob centre for troops arriving home from Germany during the First World War.

Just off the Market Square, in the now truncated Market Street, there was an ancient candle factory which is believed to have been there in the time of Elizabeth I. For many years there was an arrangement under which Dover butchers were required by law to take their meat fat to the factory for the production of candles. It is said that the Corporation acted as a middleman, paying an agreed price between butcher and candlemaker. The custom of delivering fat to the centre continued for around 300 years. It was in this same Market Street area that Edward Hills had his coach building works from around 1827 until he moved to bigger premises in Castle Street in 1836.

A. L. Thomas established his Dour Iron Foundry, which over the years grew to become Dover Engineering Works, then Elkington Gatic, and finally Gatic. The company continues to produce iron gas and airtight access covers to the present day, supplying British and international markets from reduced premises in Holmestone Road. There are still drain covers around marked A. L. Thomas and Sons, and many more that bear the more recent names of Elkington Gatic and Gatic.

One of Dover's oldest industries was the making of boots and shoes, especially for the military. Messrs Coulthard and Wilson had their premises in Last Lane (now gone) off Queen Street. Buckland, off London Road, was a land of mills, even when the Normans drew up their Domesday Book. The millers used the river, with dams in places, to provide the power to drive the machinery. Some of the mills were built to grind corn to make bread, some were converted to breweries, and others manufactured paper

At one stage these mill lands were in the ownership of the Maison Dieu but after the dissolution of the monasteries by Henry VIII they passed into the hands of various individuals, some of whom were already millers. By 1777 Ingram Horn, a paper manufacturer, owned one of the bigger mills and later Dover bankers Samuel Latham and Peter Fector had financial interests in one or more mills at Buckland. The last large flour mill making use of Dour waters was Chitty's Mill at Charlton Green which, wrecked by enemy action towards the end of the Second World War, caught fire and was never re-opened. Today the site is occupied by houses and a branch of Halfords.

== See also ==
- List of people from Dover
- Port of Dover
