= Dover Priory =

Priory in Dover, Kent, England

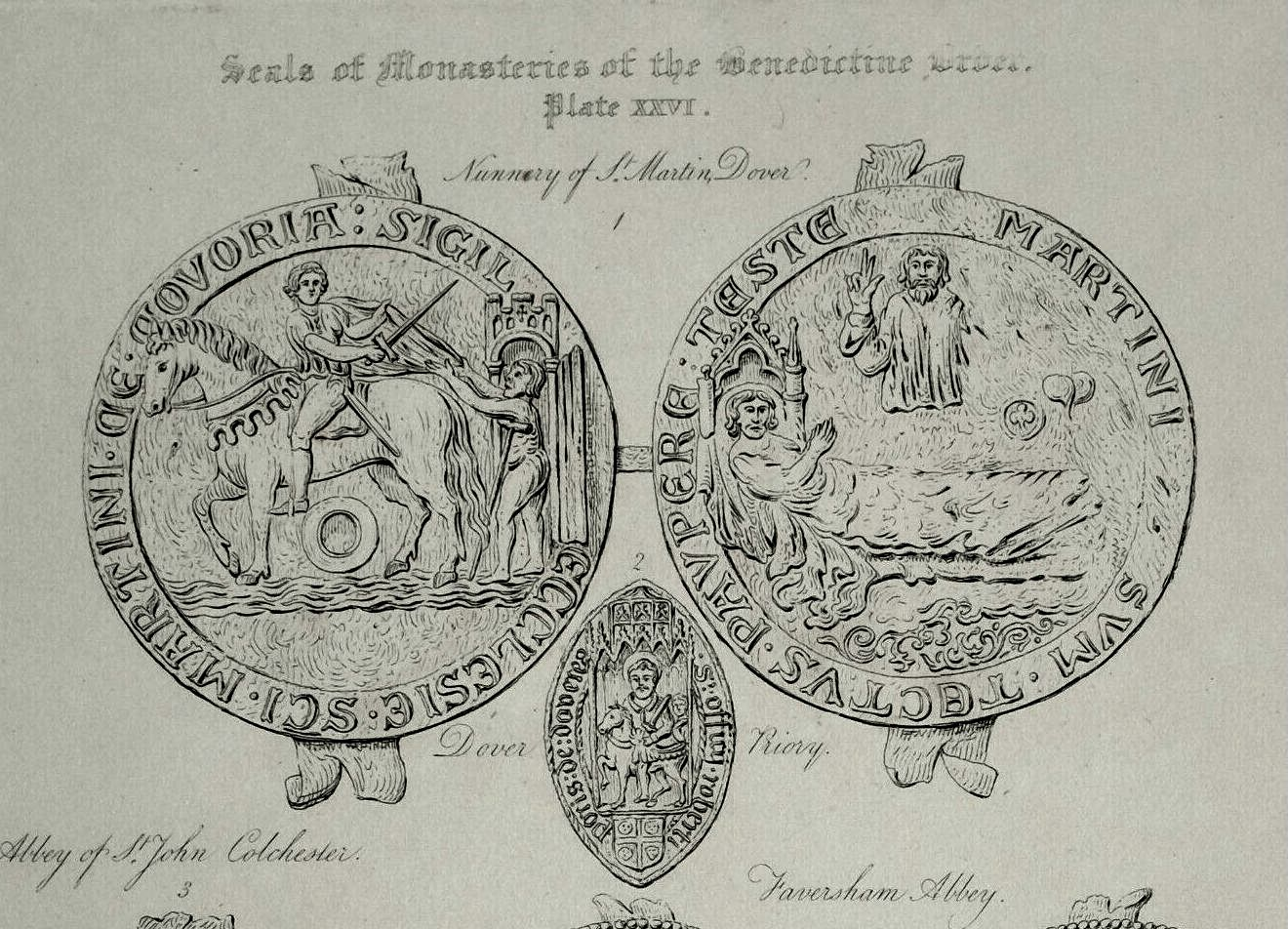
- Seals of St Martin's Priory and Nunnery

- Location within Kent

Monastery information
- Full name: The Priory of St. Mary the Virgin and St. Martin of the New Work, or Newark
- Established: 1130
- Disestablished: 1538
- Diocese: Canterbury

Site
- Coordinates: 51°7′35″N 1°18′24″E
- Visible remains: Gatehouse, guesthouse, refectory
- Public access: By permission
- Other information: Site occupied by Dover College

The Priory of St. Mary the Virgin and St. Martin of the New Work, or Newark, commonly called Dover Priory, was a priory at Dover in southeast England. It was variously independent in rule, then occupied by canons regular of the Augustinian rule, then finally monks of the Benedictine rule as a cell of Christchurch Monastery, Canterbury.

The priory was located just east of what is now Dover Priory railway station, in fact the railway was built on the western part of the site. Housing has been built on the eastern part of the site where the church once stood, between Priory Road and the later Effingham Street in the area of Norman Street and Saxon Street. Dover College, a private boarding school, occupies the land between the station and Effingham Street and has rescued some of the medieval buildings for use by its pupils. The 12th-century Strangers' Refectory on Effingham Street retains its function and is also used for concerts; the gateway to the priory is now the college archives and the priory guesthouse has been consecrated as the school chapel.

== History ==
=== Saxon origins ===
In the early 7th century, a community of 22 secular canons was instituted in the Saxon burgh at Dover Castle by King Eadbald of Kent (616-640), possibly related to the Saxon church of St Mary de Castro there. Taking their existing rights and privileges with them, these canons were transferred to a new small church dedicated to St Martin in the land now occupied by Market Square towards the end of the 7th century, by King Wihtred in fulfilment of a vow to that saint. Their living was dependent on land and tithe grants, and the grant of half of some of the dues levied at the port, held in common.

=== Odo ===
The original small church at Market Square was granted to Odo, Bishop of Bayeux upon the Norman Conquest. He rebuilt it on a grander scale, probably on or near the same site, and so was henceforth known as St. Martin's Le Grand (the Great). It was built above the much earlier foundations of Roman baths, with its churchyard covering most of the present Market Square.

=== New foundation ===
Since the Castle church, which had been their original Saxon home, was in some sense a Royal Chapel, the canons had always been a Royal peculiar, outside any episcopal control and only recognising the authority of the King, and later the Pope. The then Archbishop of Canterbury, William de Corbeil, wanted to bring an end to this and extend his influence to Dover. Therefore, in 1130, using the canons' behaviour as a pretext, he persuaded Henry I to give him a charter allowing him to transfer their assets to a new Priory of St Martin in Dover, whilst leaving their Market Square church to be used as the principal parish church of the town for the use of the townsfolk. The parish church remained dedicated to St Martin—the new priory was called "St. Martin's of the New Work", or "Newark", to distinguish it from the parish church—and under the new Priory's control (its few remains can now be seen on the western side of Market Square, near Dover Museum.)

A site having been secured (probably from land that belonged to the former canons of St. Martin's le Grand), building began there in 1131, and within five years it was partially occupied by 12 canons regular as a Priory dedicated to the Blessed Virgin Mary and St. Martin. Archbishop Theobald completed the buildings in about 1140 and in 1143 confirmed the transfer of the assets of St Martin le Grand and established that thereafter the new priory would follow the Benedictine Rule and remain in possession of the Cathedral church at Canterbury as a mere "cell", at the disposition of the Archbishop. Much controversy thus ensued over the following two centuries between the monks of the cathedral and the canons of Dover Priory.

=== 1150–1500 ===
King Stephen was said to have died on a journey whilst staying at the Priory in 1154. Repaired and extended in 1231 after much damage in a fire of 1201, it was pillaged by the French in a raid in August 1295, during which a monk called Thomas de la Hale was murdered. Extensive repairs were made in the 1480s.

The abbey's church seems to have been a very large one—the King's Commissioner sent to assess it by Thomas Cromwell (just prior to its dissolution) described it to him in a letter as "the fairest church in all that quarter of Kent." It was probably three times as long as St. Mary's Church in Dover, with a general plan perhaps comparable to Repton Priory, or to the Cistercian Stanley Abbey in Wiltshire. Its tower would have stood almost at the present junction of Effingham and Saxon Streets. Of its estimated area of about 25,000 square feet (2,300 m^{2}), about 110 feet (34 m) square of this were its cloisters, with a chapter house joined to the church's transept's north wall, and about an eighth was a refectory.

It had an impressive scriptorium and library which vanished from the records at the Dissolution—parts of it re-appeared on the open market later and are now in colleges of the University of Cambridge, including the Dover Bible (one of only six surviving giant Romanesque Bibles) in the Parker Library of Corpus Christi.

=== Dissolution ===
In 1538 it was suppressed in the Dissolution of the Monasteries. The inventory made of the Priory's goods just beforehand suggest that the monks were living in straitened circumstances by that time (although that may be a fictional pretext for dissolution), but that some provision was still made for the entertainment of visitors to the town.

After its suppression, leading townsmen plundered the buildings for stone, lead and other building materials, leaving just two barns, the gate-house, the refectory and a large hall still standing. Fishermen speaking in court in 1565, said that they had in the past taken their tithes of fish to the Priory "whiles it stood". These buildings were adapted to agricultural use (apart from the 'large hall', which might have been used to house guests). The town records (the new poor law demanded that vagrants be rounded up periodically by the mayor and his officers for questioning and then usually ejected from the town) show that one of these buildings, known as the "Priory Barn", was frequently used as a refuge for vagrants, particularly at times of poor harvests, plague and low employment such as the 1590s and 1620s. This may have been because of a folk memory of a time when the Priory, like other religious houses, was a place of refuge and hospitality for the poor.

Its lands were granted first to a cleric called Richard Thornden or Thornton, but passed on shortly afterwards to Archbishop Thomas Cranmer when Thornton received an important benefice. In December 1538, Cranmer leased them out to Henry Bingham of Wingham, gentleman, on a 999-year lease, who then (as the Archbishop had always done when the monastery was still active) in turn leased them out to others. Probably some active, entrepreneurial men who were later to become very influential in the life of the town first came to Dover with the express purpose of exploiting the lands and tithes of this and other suppressed religious houses of the area.

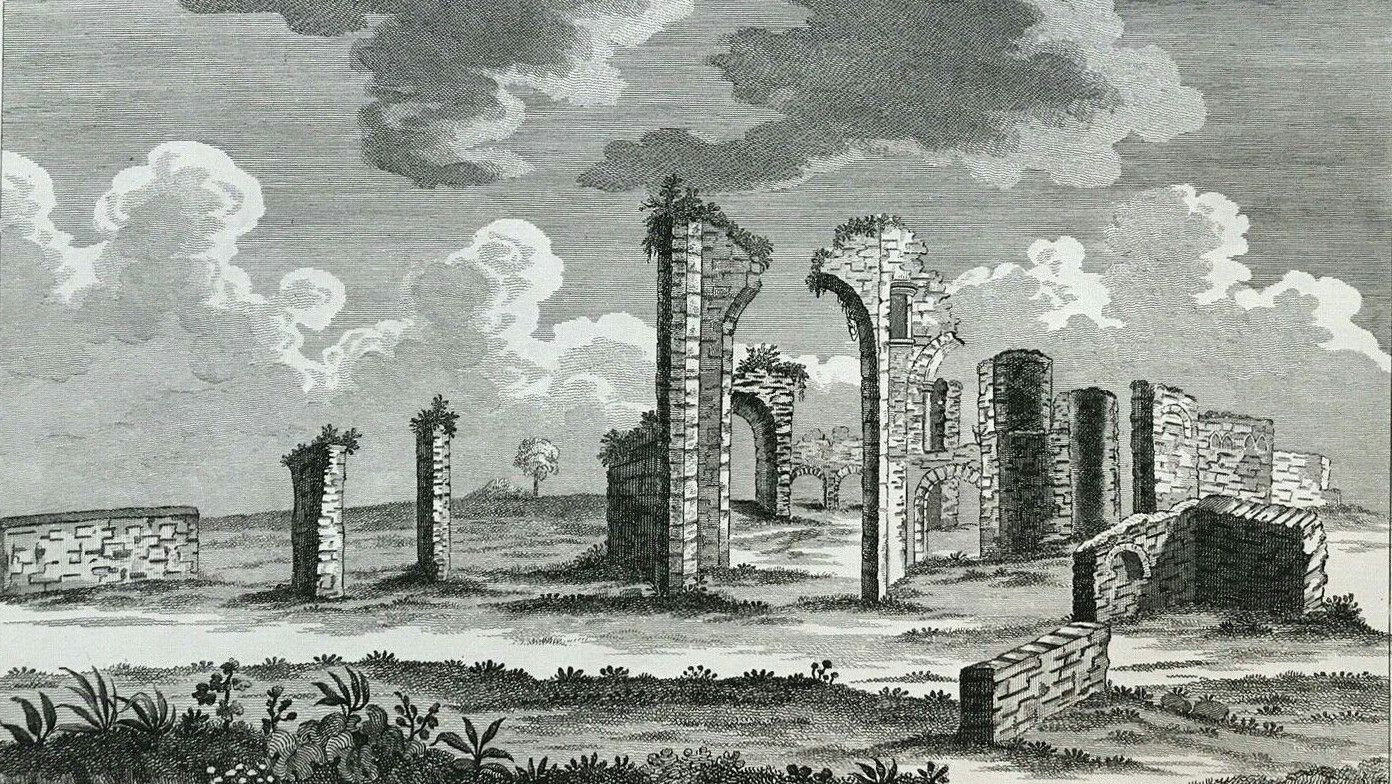
Former ruins Where Dover Priory railway station now stands, 1780

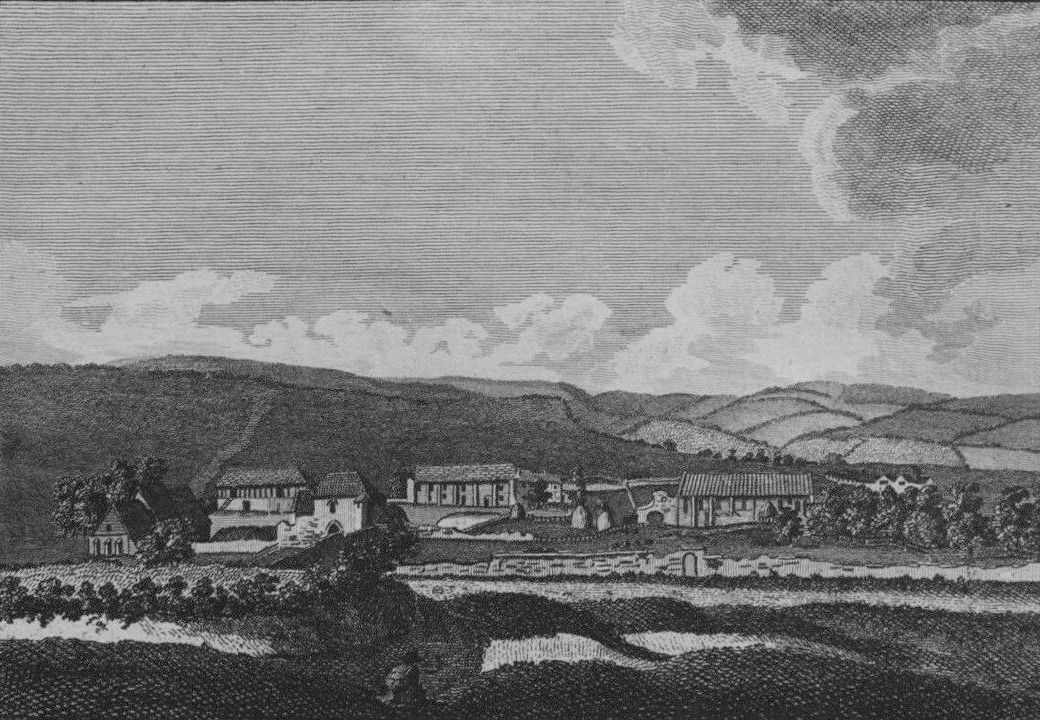
Priory site, 1786

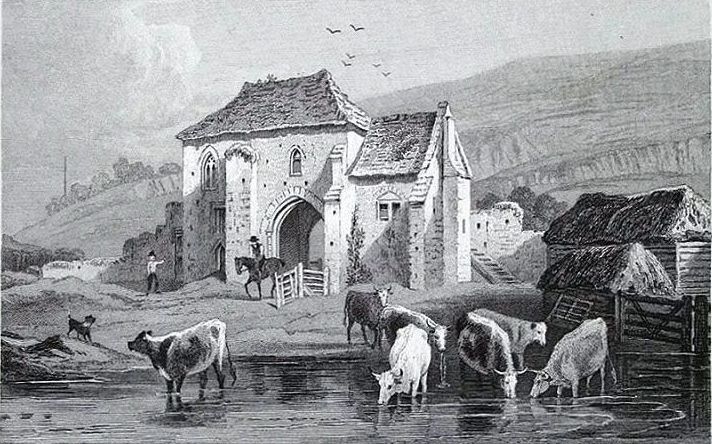
Priory gatehouse, 1829 (now occupied by Dover College)

=== 18th and 19th centuries ===
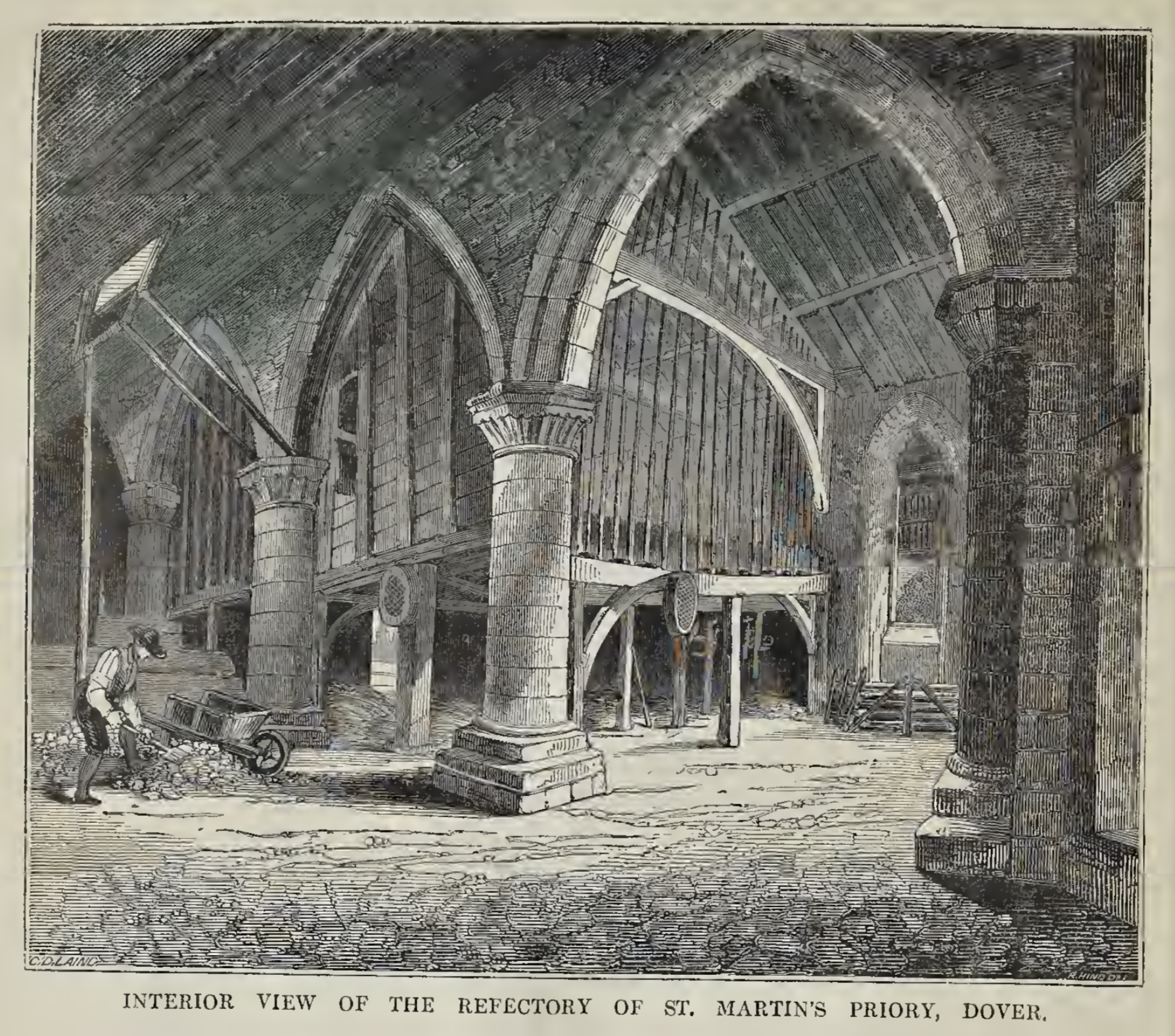
Interior view of the Refectory of St. Martin's Priory, Dover, 1844

Illustrations from the 18th and early 19th centuries of the Priory Farm show its decaying Norman buildings and its two ponds as a picturesque ruin and a pleasant spot on the edge of the town. Upon the Duke of Wellington's installation as Lord Warden of the Cinque Ports in August 1839, a grand fete was held in the Priory meadow.

Much of the buildings were demolished during the first half of the 19th century, including the two barns, one in the north-west corner of the grounds some time after 1850, and one in the south-west corner in 1868.

In 1840 the Priory site's owner (a farmer called John Coleman) the south-eastern parts of the enclosed site was let on a building lease to Parker Ayres. This damaged the remaining buildings but between 1845 and 1847, the local cleric Dr. F.C.Plumptre had already noted everything he possibly could about the foundations of the original buildings. His reconstruction suggests that the builders probably created Effingham Street along the site of the dormitory, chapter house and transepts, Effingham Crescent along what might have been the reredorter, and Saxon Street and the houses and gardens of the north side of St. Martin's Hill along what was once the nave of the church.

From c.1840 to 1868, the local timber merchant Steriker Finnis leased or owned the western portion of the site. In 1868 the ponds were drained and this portion of the grounds became Priory Gate Road and part of the yard of Dover Priory railway station.

=== Dover College ===
In 1869 Robert Chignell, who had a private school at Westmount, in Folkestone Road, leased part of the Priory buildings for a private school. He passed on his interest, however, to a group of leading citizens in Dover who had formed the Dover College Company to promote the foundation of a public school on what remained of the Priory site with the dual intention of providing a public school education for local boys and of using and thus preserving the Priory's remaining ancient buildings.

Dover College opened modestly in 1871. It acquired the large hall, or guest-house, in 1879 and converted it into a chapel for the school by enlarging the east end into an apse. In time, the Ecclesiastical Commissioners made over the whole property to the College Trustees. The Strangers' Refectory was restored and an important but damaged fresco was found there. The gatehouse was restored in 1881, to mark a charitable act by Sir Richard Dickenson the then mayor of Dover. Famous alumni of Dover College include Simon Cowell, Air Marshal Sir Hugh Walmsley, Sir Frederick Ashton, J. Lee Thompson, Admiral Sir Peter White, George Lam, Michael Kuhn, Guy East, and Dai Fujikura.

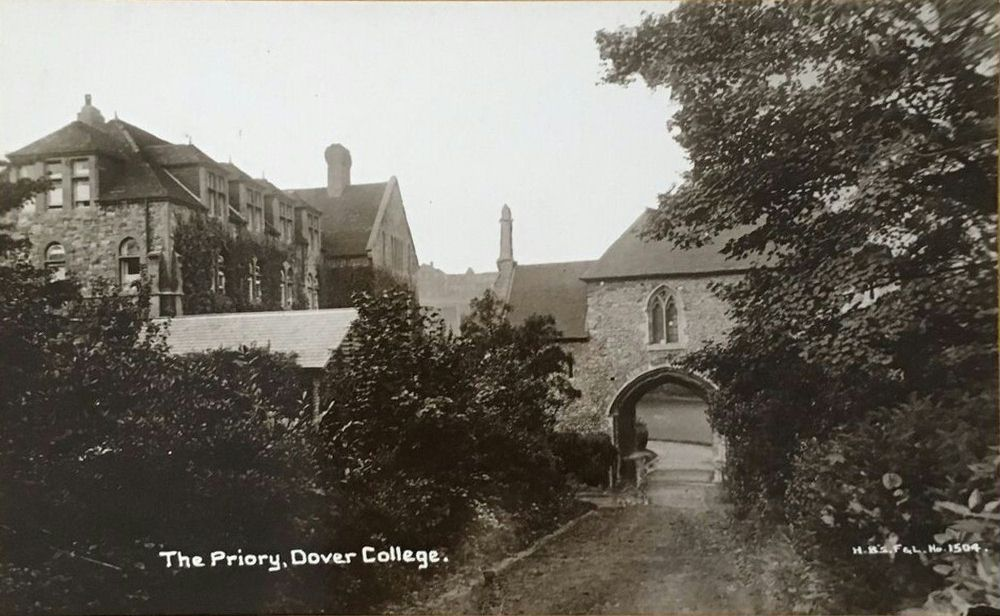
Dover College gatehouse, before 1914

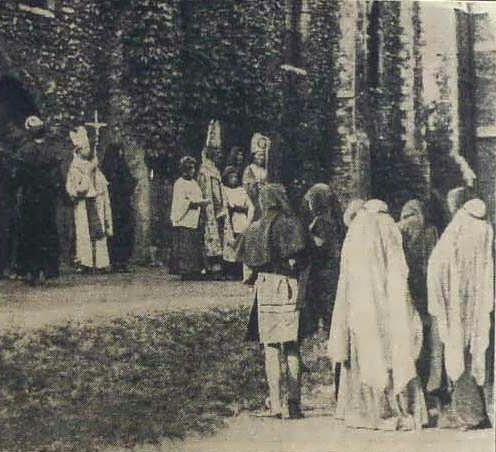
Priory 1136 foundation celebration, at Dover college, 1937

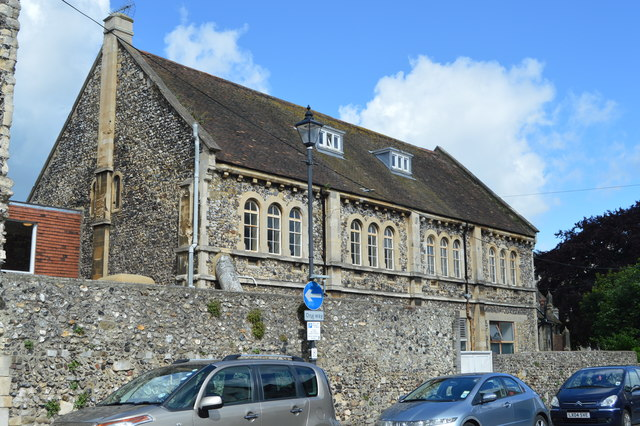
Dover College, 2016

== See also ==
- Maison Dieu, Dover – across Priory Road, founded in 1203 to provide hospitality to pilgrims
- St Edmund's Chapel – a wayside chapel on Priory Road, serving a cemetery set up by the Priory

== Bibliography ==
- Haines, Charles Reginald (1930). Dover Priory: A History of the Priory of St Mary the Virgin and St Martin of the New Work. Cambridge: Cambridge University Press. OCLC 5005889. – has old engravings of the priory
