= St Edmund's Chapel =

Wayside chapel in Dover, Kent, England

Coordinates: 51°07′39″N 1°18′33″E

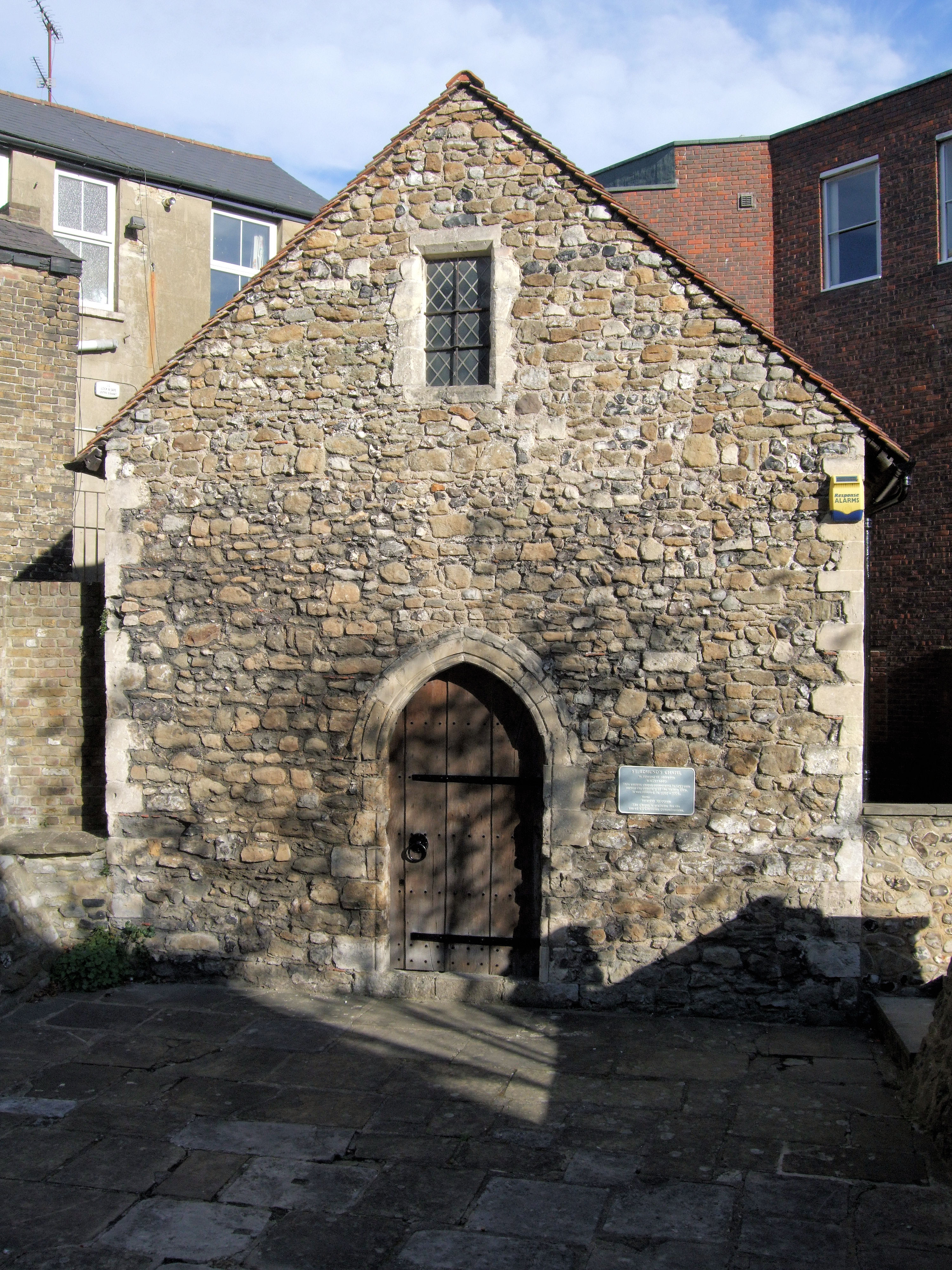
St Edmund's Chapel in Dover.

St Edmund's Chapel is a church in Dover, England, dedicated to St Edmund. It was completed in 1262 as a wayside chapel or chapel of rest for the cemetery for the poor beside the Maison Dieu, just outside the enclosed part of the medieval town, a short distance above Biggin Gate, and for pilgrims setting off for Thomas Becket's shrine at Canterbury Cathedral. This cemetery had been established by the monks of Dover Priory.

The building is about 28 feet in length, by 14 feet broad with walls of rubble masonry two feet thick, with Caen stone quoins and dressings.

It was first consecrated on Refreshment Sunday 30 March 1253 by Bishop Richard of Chichester, who preached his last sermon on that occasion, saying that he had always longed before his last day to "consecrate one church at least in honour of Blessed Edmund." Next morning during Mass, he fell to the ground, and was carried to bed in the Maison Dieu, where he died on 3 April. His internal organs were then removed in this chapel in preparation for the journey to Chichester Cathedral, where he wished to be buried, and placed in the chapel altar. Because of this and its dedication, it became a place of pilgrimage in its own right.

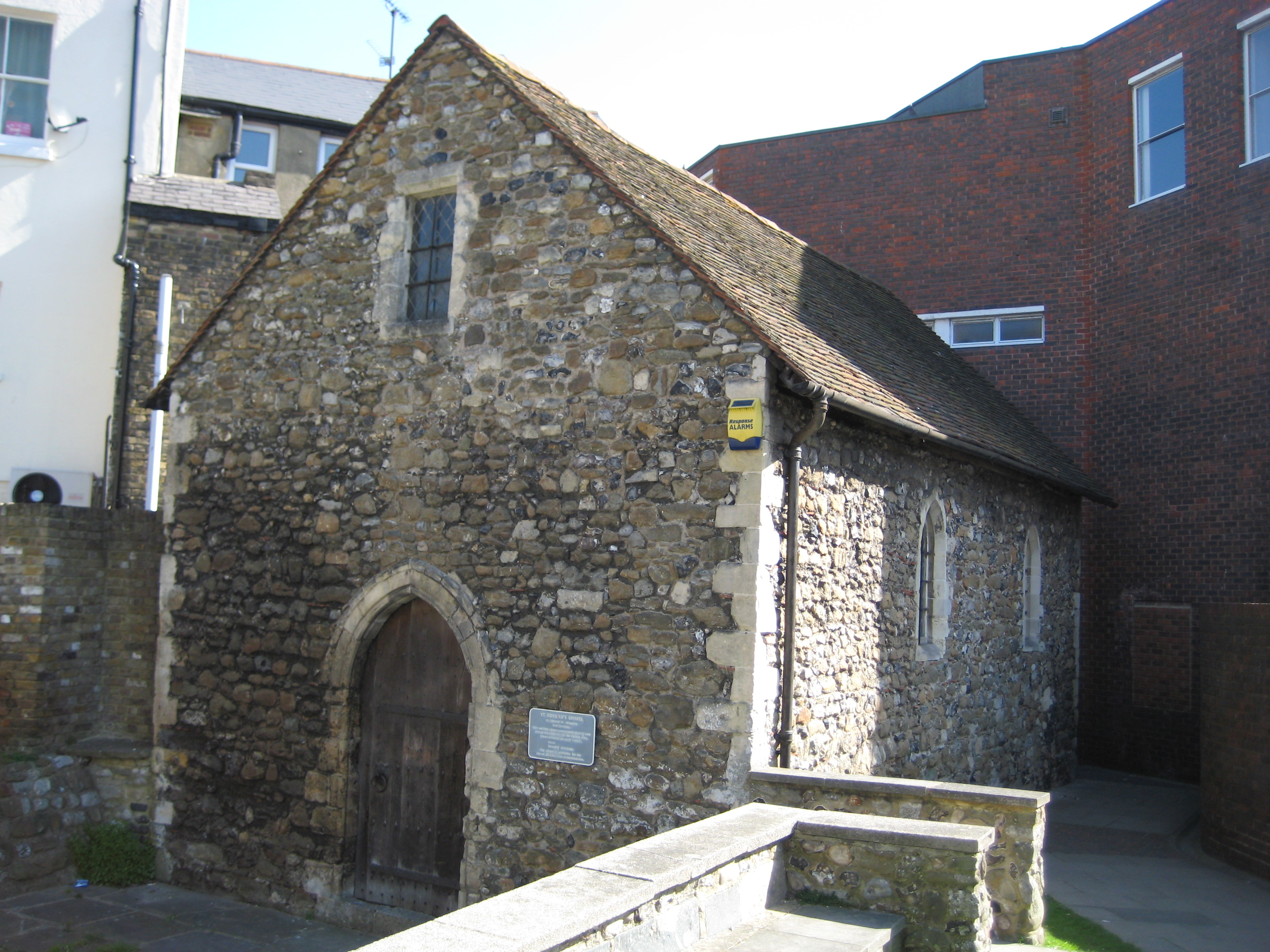
The chapel as viewed from Priory Road

At the dissolution of the monasteries, the chapel, Priory and Maison Dieu were all dissolved in 1544. The rest of its history is sketchy - immediately after the dissolution, it was probably still associated with the fortunes of the Maison Dieu and became part of a victualling store for the Navy, and later became a store-house for the shops which came to be built in Biggin Street.

In the middle of the 19th century it was converted into a two-floor building, and became a dwelling-house and forge. In 1943 artillery shells from the cross channel guns destroyed the two shops hiding the chapel on the Priory Road side, leaving the chapel itself untouched. Attempts to make it a Scheduled Ancient Monument in 1963 failed and it was scheduled for demolition, but on attracting interest from a local Catholic priest(Father Tanner) it was privately purchased two years later. From 1967, it underwent a one-year restoration project, using original medieval techniques (although at least 75 per cent of the building seen today is original), and reconsecrated in 1968 . During the restoration there was a 4-day archaeological investigation conducted by Brian Philp . In 1973 the building was protected with a grade II* listing. It is now an ecumenical chapel, and was for a time open to the public. It now rarely opens. It is maintained by The St Edmund of Abingdon Memorial Trust. Though it is used for a Saturday morning Eucharist, a Christian Unity vigil, candle-lit services for the Feast Days of St Edmund and St Richard, it now opens to the public less frequently. On Good Friday 18 April 2014 prayers were said in the chapel by the Archbishop of Canterbury The Most Reverend Justin Welby. This was probably the first visit by an Archbishop of Canterbury for many centuries.
