= List of people from Dover =

Dover is a town and seaport in Kent, England. The following is a list of those people who were born and/or have lived extensively in Dover.

- Frederick Arnold (1899–1980), cricketer and British Army officer
- James Barber (1923–2007), cookbook author and host of CBC's The Urban Peasant
- Tammy Beaumont (born 1991), England cricketer
- Charlotte Bellamy (born 1973), TV actress
- Edward Betts (1815–1872), civil engineer and contractor
- Bob Bolder (born 1958), footballer
- Alan Clayson (born 1951), musician
- Charlie Connelly (born 1970), journalist and nonfiction writer
- Wayne Couzens (born 1972), police officer, Sarah Everard's killer.
- Sir Alfred Dyer (1865–1947), journalist, chief executive, and Conservative Party politician
- Colin Greenland (born 1954), novelist
- David Elleray (born 1954), FA football referee
- Wally Hammond (1903–1965), cricketer
- Topper Headon (born 1955), drummer
- Rob Henderson (born 1972), rugby union player
- White Kennett (1660–1728), Anglican Bishop of Peterborough and antiquarian
- Jim Leverton (born 1946), rock musician
- John Lloyd (born 1951), comedy writer and TV producer
- Rhys Lloyd (born 1982), American football player
- E. J. Lowe (1950–2014), philosopher and academic
- Miriam Margolyes (born 1941), actress (Professor Sprout in Harry Potter and The Spanish Infanta in Blackadder)
- Sammy Moore (born 1987), football player
- Howard Mowll (1890–1958), Anglican Archbishop of Sydney and Primate of Australia
- Andrea Newman (1938–2019), author and television screenwriter
- Cuthbert Ottaway (1850–1879), first captain of the England football team
- Edward Pellew, 1st Viscount Exmouth (1757–1833), naval commander
- Frank Rutley (1842–1904), geologist
- Patrick Saul (1913–1999), sound archivist
- Henry Hawley Smart (1833–1893), army officer and prolific novelist
- Joss Stone (born 1987), soul and R and B singer/songwriter, and occasional actress
- Neil Stuke (born 1966), actor
- John Russell Taylor (born 1935), critic and author
- Carl Thompson (1981/2–2015), heaviest man in the United Kingdom
- Arthur H. Vachell (1864–1933), English watercolorist
- Philip Yorke, 1st Earl of Hardwicke (1690–1764), politician and Lord Chancellor
- Shane Taylor (born 1974), actor
- William Crundall (1847-1934), Mayor of the town thirteen times between 1886-1911.
- Rev. Canon Thomas Benjamin Watkins (1856–1933), vicar of Old St James' Church, Dover, between 1907 and 1926.
