= Maison Dieu, Dover =

Municipal building in Dover, Kent, England

Dover Town Hall and the remains of the Maison Dieu
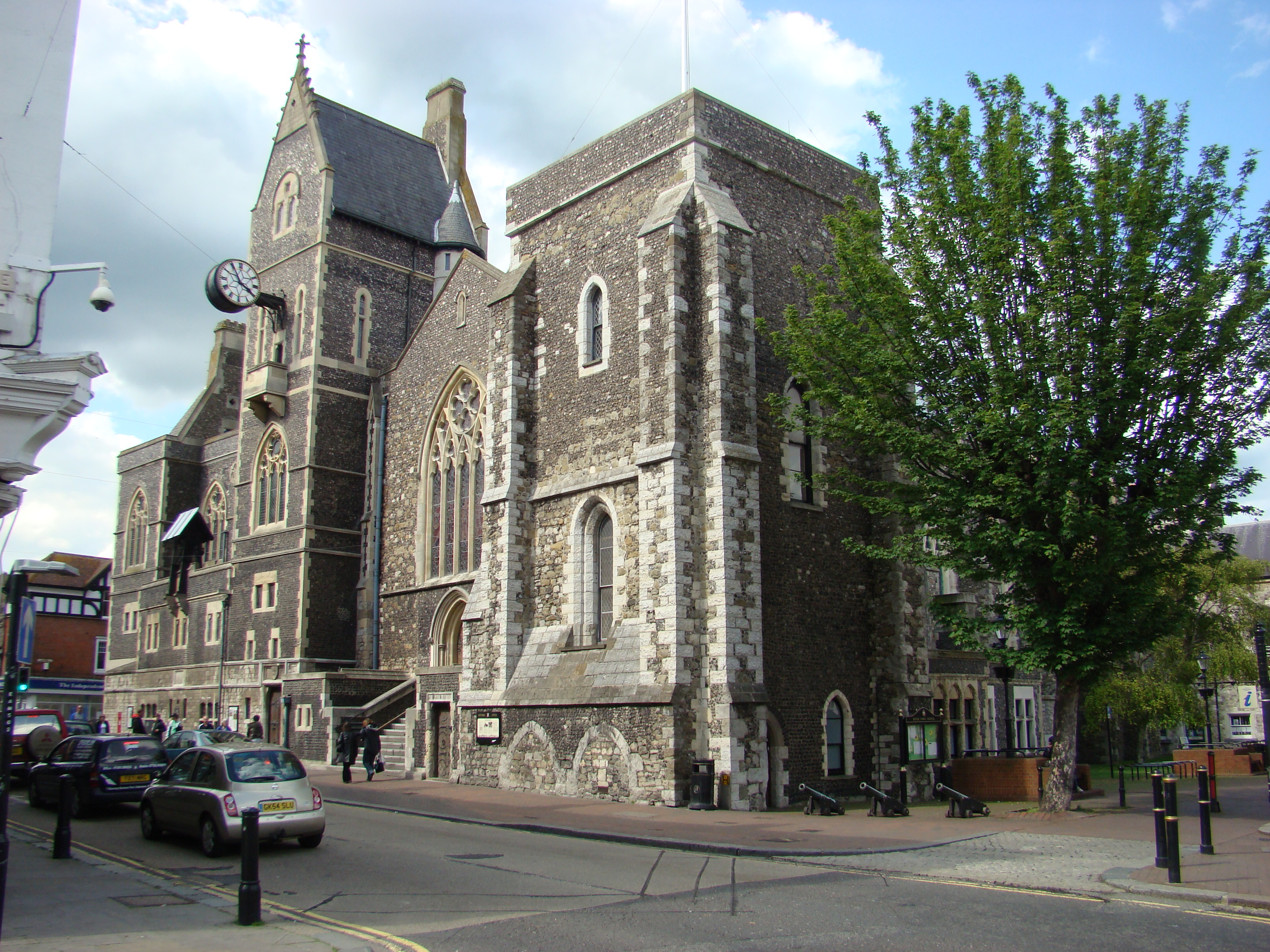
- Maison Dieu (foreground, with later Town Hall buildings in the background).

- Location within Kent
- 51°07′41″N 1°18′32″E
- Location: Dover, Kent

History
- Built: 1203

Listed Building – Grade I
- Designated: 17 December 1973
- Reference no.: 1069499

The Hospital of St Mary, Domus Dei, or Maison Dieu (Latin/Norman French – house of God), is a medieval building in Dover, England which forms the oldest part of Dover Town Hall. The Town Hall and remains of medieval Maison Dieu were Grade II* listed in 1973; they were upgraded to a Grade I listing in 2017.

== History ==
=== Foundation in 13th century ===
Mason Dieu was founded in 1203 by Hubert de Burgh, the Constable of Dover Castle, as the "Hospital of the Mason Dieu" to accommodate pilgrims coming from the Continent to visit the shrine of Thomas Becket in Canterbury Cathedral. de Burgh gave the manors of River and Kingsdown to the hospital in order to fund it. Simon de Wardune also gave some land.

The original buildings consisted of one large hall (later referred to as the Pilgrims' Hall) with a kitchen and living quarters attached for the Master and Brethren who 'practised hospitality to all strangers'. The hospital accommodated permanent pensioners and other wounded and poor soldiers, as well as pilgrims.

In 1227, a chapel was added at the north-east end of the hall, and Henry III attended its consecration. (Today, this chapel survives as a courtroom, having been converted in the nineteenth century by the town council of Dover.) Subsequently, the number of priest brothers based at the hospital grew, and in 1239 it was brought under the rule of Saint Augustine.

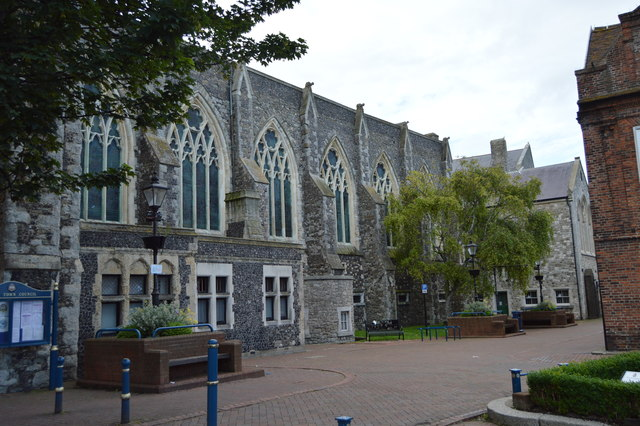
Stone Hall, seen from the south.

A "Great Chamber", built in 1253, is thought to be the present 'Stone Hall', which has interesting stained glass and contains the town corporation's civic paintings, Cinque Ports Volunteers regimental flags, arms, and armour. A square tower, at the southernmost corner of the site, also dates from this period (1250-1350).

The grounds of the hospital extended well to the east, on the far side of the River Dour. As well as the buildings by the roadside, the site included a wash house, a watermill, a bakehouse, a slaughterhouse, stables and a cemetery. There was also a house (or 'mansion') for the Master of the hospital and a sizeable library of 117 books.

St Edmund's Chapel was built next to the Maison Dieu (where it still stands). It became a place of pilgrimage after the canonisation of Richard of Chichester in 1262: nine years earlier, Bishop Richard had consecrated the chapel, but he fell ill later that day and was taken into the Maison Dieu where he died, on 3 April 1253.

There are records of a number of royal visits taking place, up to the end of the 14th century; in 1396 Richard II appointed his regent at the Maison Dieu, before setting sail for France.

=== Dissolution in 1534 ===
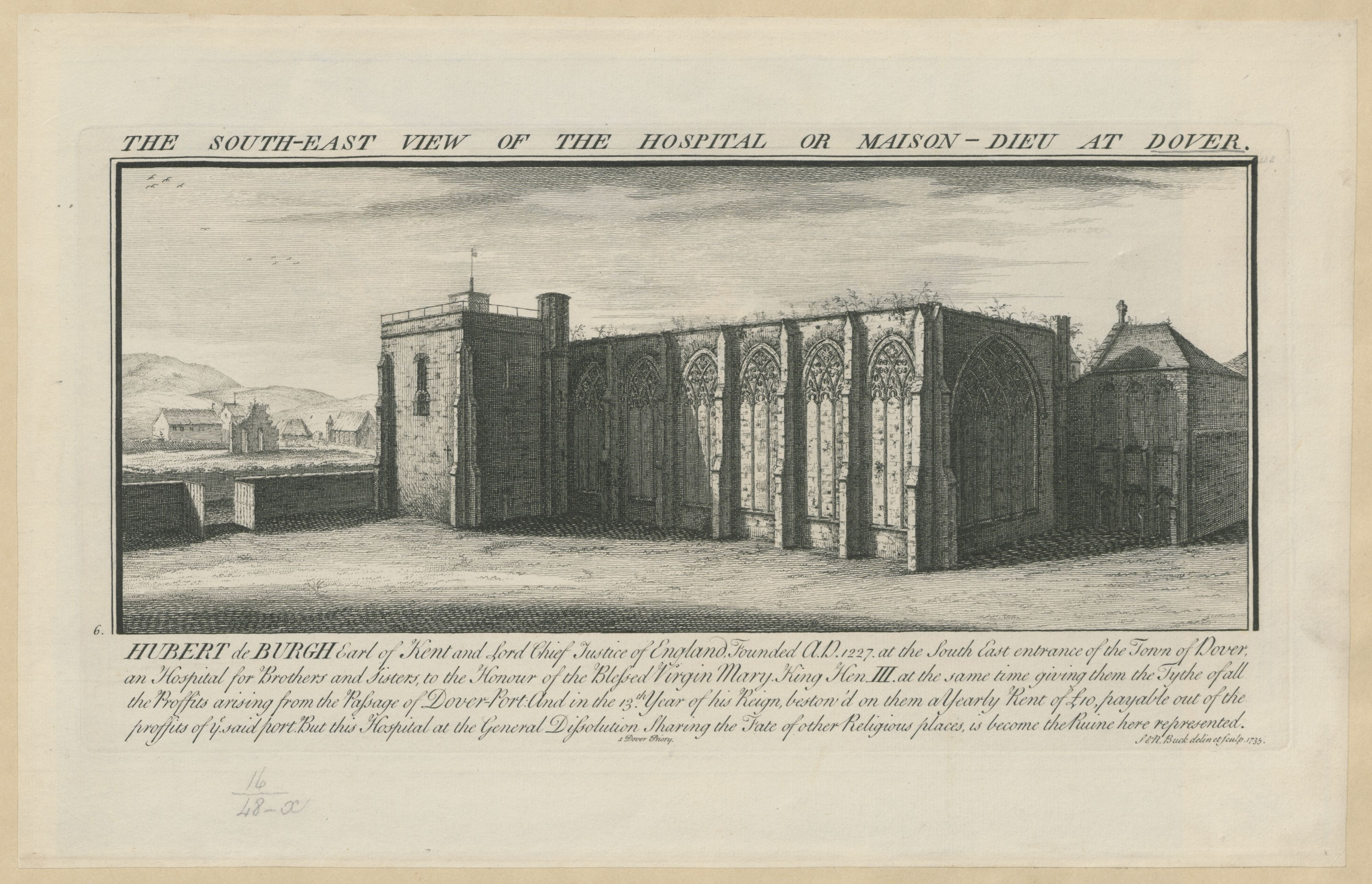
South-east view of the Maison Dieu in 1735 (by Samuel Buck), showing: (left to right) the Square Tower, Stone Hall and Courtroom (former chapel).

When the Master and Brethren of the Hall signed an oath accepting Henry VIII's Act of Supremacy, declaring him the Head of the Church of England, in 1534, the institution's religious role ended. Ten years later, the building was surrendered to the Crown, together with its nearby subsidiary, St Edmund's Chapel. Between 1544 and 1831 the Maison Dieu served as a victualling store for naval vessels anchored nearby in the Downs.

Maison Dieu House (right) pictured alongside the Maison Dieu in 1800.

Following the Restoration the victualling yard was refurbished; facilities on the site at this time included a brewhouse, bakehouse, flesh store, pickle house and granaries. In 1665, Maison Dieu House was built, just to the south of the medieval hall, as accommodation for the Agent Victualler (the senior officer on site). After the victualling yard closed in 1831, the Maison Dieu was briefly used by the Board of Ordnance as an office and depot for the local company of Royal Engineers.

=== 19th century ===
In 1834, the building was sold to the Corporation of Dover who used the Maison Dieu as the Town Hall. Previously, a 17th-century building known as the Court Hall in the Market Square had served this purpose; its successor would likewise serve as a prison and a court of justice, as well as a civic meeting place. At first, the building was used by the Town Council with minimal restorations. The floor of the Stone Hall was raised, creating a basement level which was used for the prison, with two rows of vaulted cells inserted either side of a central corridor. At the same time the old chapel was converted into a courtroom; again the floor level was raised to provide room for prison cells on the lower level. Some seventy prisoners were accommodated at the Maison Dieu in this period, both men and women, in reportedly very cramped conditions. The medieval square tower was used to house the prison governor.

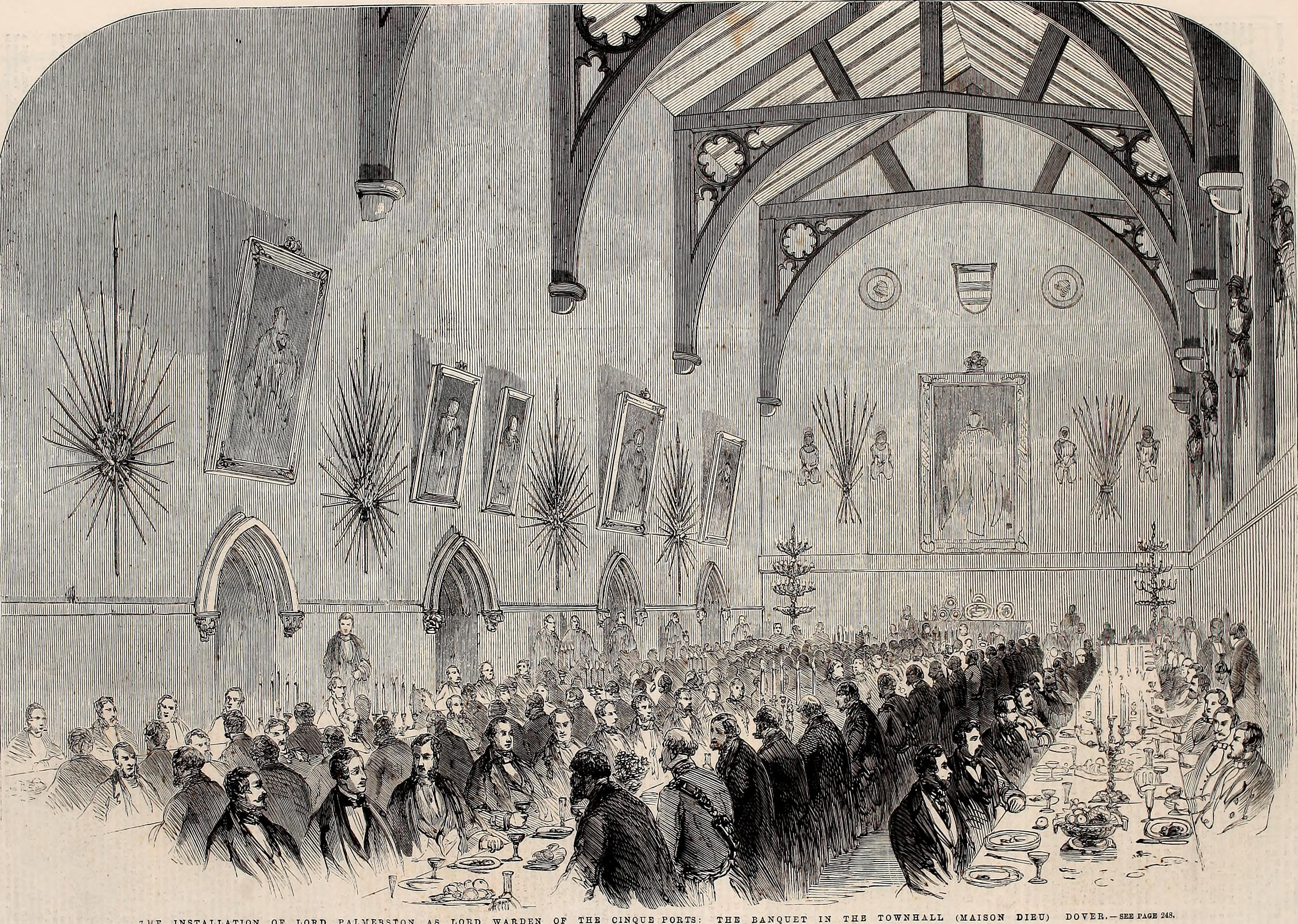
Banquet following the Installation of Lord Palmerston as Lord Warden of the Cinque Ports (1861).

Eventually, the Council decided to fully restore the building, and in 1851 they agreed to implement renovations suggested by Victorian architect Ambrose Poynter. After seven years of fundraising for the project, William Burges, another famous Victorian architect, funded almost entirely by the council, began work on the restoration project. Burges's admiration of the original mediaeval style can be seen in such parts of his renovation as grotesque animals and in the coats of arms incorporated into his new designs.

==== Prison improvements ====
The 1865 Prison Act required the Council to improve its gaol facilities, so in 1867 the medieval Pilgrim's Hall (which stood alongside and parallel to the Stone Hall, to the north-west) was demolished and replaced with a brand new prison block containing four tiers of cells (to house a total of 56 inmates). As part of the new building an imposing four-storey tower was built alongside the High Street (to correspond with the medieval square tower on the other side of the Stone Hall). In that same year, a new Magistrates' Room (which became the Council Chamber) was built, adjacent to the north-east end of the Stone Hall (with cells provided on the floor below); it replaced a room which had been demolished for the building of the prison. Both the new buildings were designed by the Town Surveyor, John Hanvey.

Ten years later, however, the prison (in common with other borough gaols) was taken over by the government under the terms of the Prison Act 1877. The prison was promptly closed by the Home Office, and in 1879 the former prison buildings were repurchased by the Town Council. Burges described them as being 'in a perfect state of repair but unfortunately useless' with regard to the Council's future requirements; and they were demolished two years later.

==== Burges's rebuilding ====
Work then began (in March 1881) on erecting a new grand public hall where the prison had formerly stood. In April of that year, however, William Burges died; his designs, though, were largely complete and the project was completed after his death by his partners, Pullan and Chapple. The new hall, or 'assembly room', was opened by the Duke and Duchess of Connaught on 14 July 1883, and it subsequently came to be known as the Connaught Hall.

The new hall had a stage at one end, galleries on either side and a further gallery facing the stage; it was designed to seat 1,200 people. Iron columns supported the galleries and the roof, and the building was decorated throughout with colourful patterns and motifs. The south-west end of the new hall (facing the High Street) had large square staircase towers on either side; the right hand tower was extended upwards to form a clock tower (which was given a projecting clock, by E. Dent & Co., in 1883). (Adjoining the clock tower on the other side was the gable end of the Stone Hall, which provided the main entrance to the complex from the High Street.)

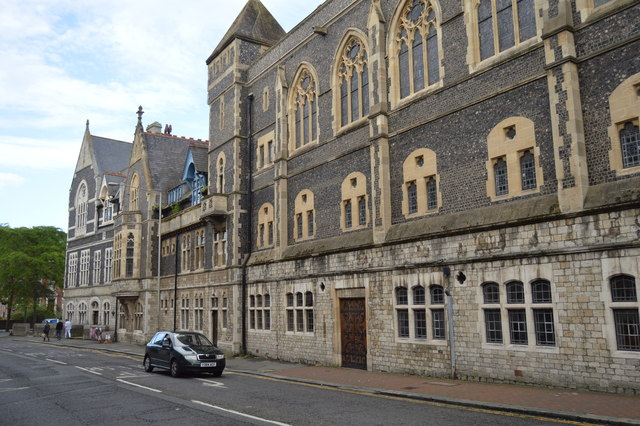
View along Ladywell, showing the School building (far left) adjoining the Mayor's Parlour, and the northern end of the Connaught Hall (right).

At the opposite end of the new hall, to the north-east, a new 'Mayoral Suite' was constructed; this extended the building's elevation (in a more 'domestic' style) along Ladywell. It contained the Mayor's Parlour (with its large oriel window) and other offices and function rooms. All the principal rooms were on the first floor; the ground floor contained offices, accommodation for a caretaker and service areas. As part of the redevelopment a police station was created at this level, underneath the Stone Hall (accessed by a separate entrance from the High Street); accommodation was provided for the Superintendent in the adjacent medieval tower.

Electric light was first introduced to the building in 1894, when electroliers were installed in the Connaught Hall (replacing the gas 'sunburners' previously in use).

In 1894, J. S. Chapple built another building immediately to the north-east of the Maison Dieu complex for a School of Science and Art (which had been established in the town by Sir Henry Cole in 1867). While functionally separate from the Town Hall, it was designed in a complementary style; it was Grade II listed in 1996.

===== Stained-glass windows =====
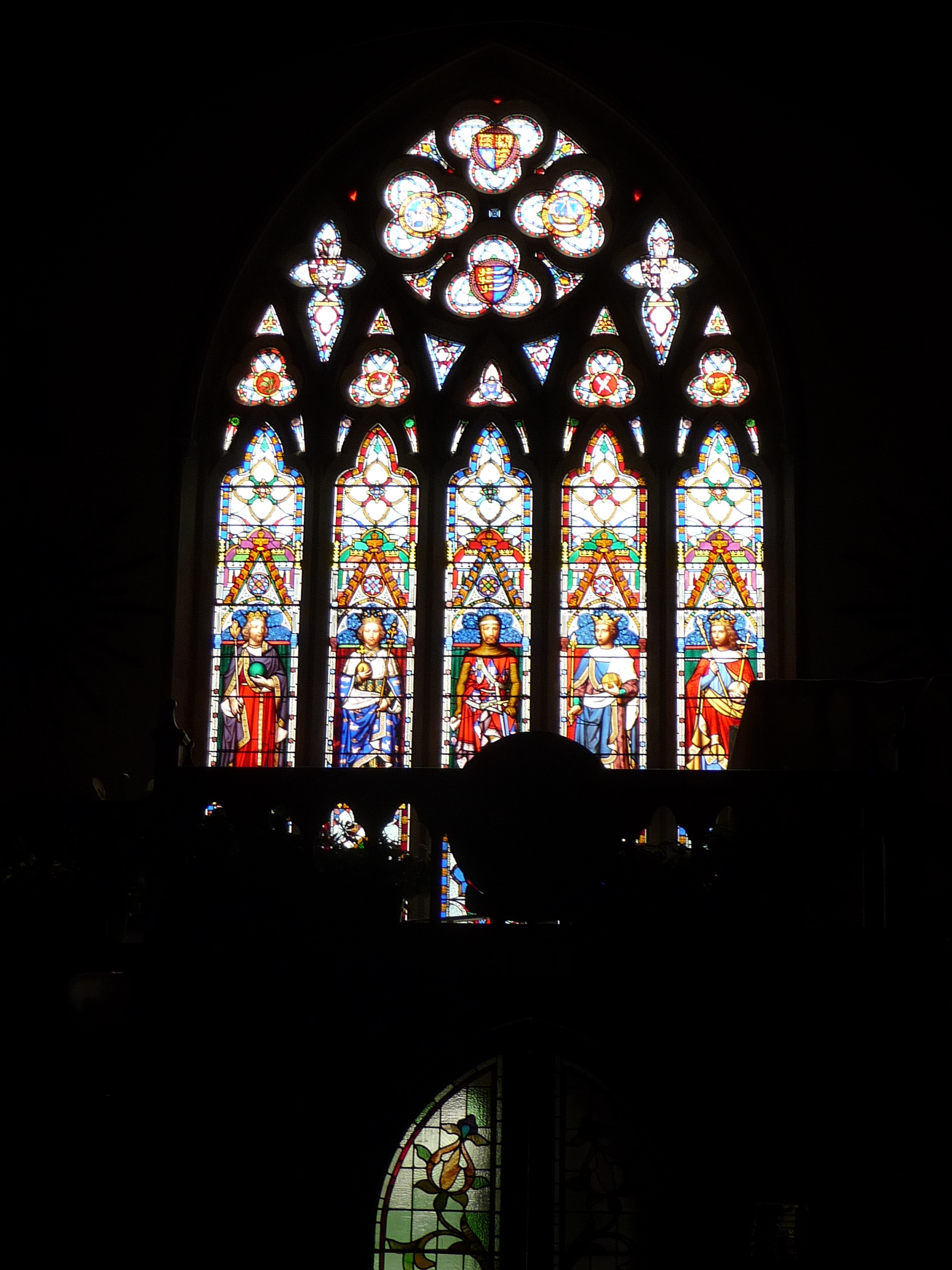
View of the west window in the Stone Hall.

In the Stone Hall, above the entrance, is a large stained-glass window representing the benefactors of the building, with Hubert de Burgh in the centre wearing a surcoat with his armorial bearings. Henri II and Henri III stand on the right side of de Burgh, Henri IV on the left side. The windows were a gift by Mrs Mary Bell (cousin and benefactor of William Kingsford, owner of Maison Dieu upon his death in 1856) in the 19th century. The windows were produced by William Wailes in 1856, to a design by Ambrose Poynter. The six windows in the south wall were designed by the latter's son, Edward Poynter; they depict historical events associated with Dover.

Windows in the Connaught Hall, and in certain other parts of the building, were designed by H. W. Lonsdale.

=== 20th century ===
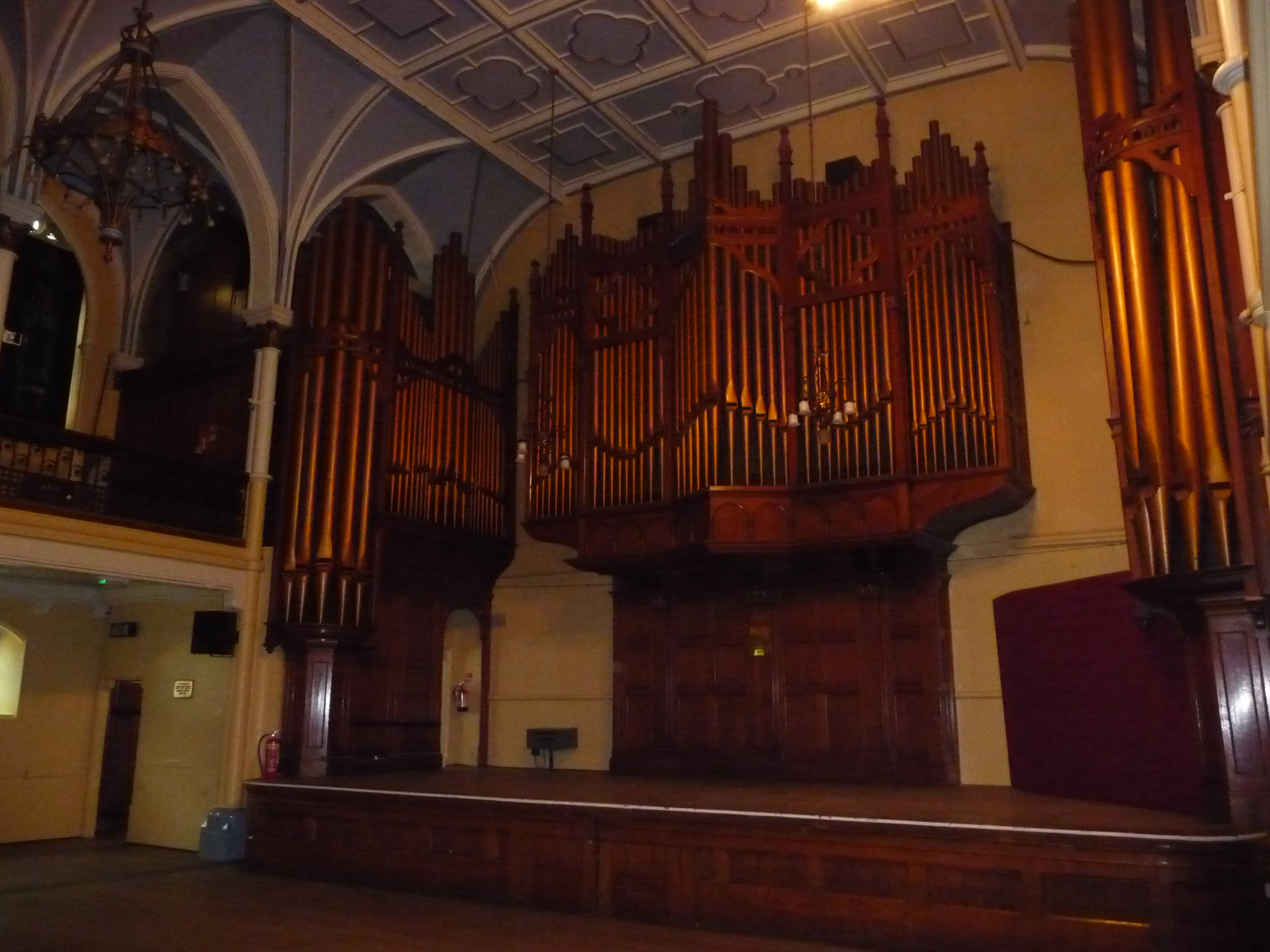
Astley Organ in the Connaught Hall.

In 1902 the Connaught Hall was furnished with an organ, made by Norman and Beard of Norwich and presented by Edward F. Astley.

Following the Great War, a bell was presented to the town by the people of Belgium in commemoration of the Zeebrugge Raid; known as the Zeebrugge Bell, it was mounted outside on the balcony in front of the Connaught Hall in 1923 ('erected to the lasting friendship of Dover and Zeebrugge') and is sounded each year on Saint George's Day (the anniversary of the raid). The following year a war memorial (designed by Reginald R. Goulden) was erected on the lawn in front of Maison Dieu House.

In 1939, with the outbreak of the Second World War, the building's stained-glass windows were removed to be protected until the end of the conflict.

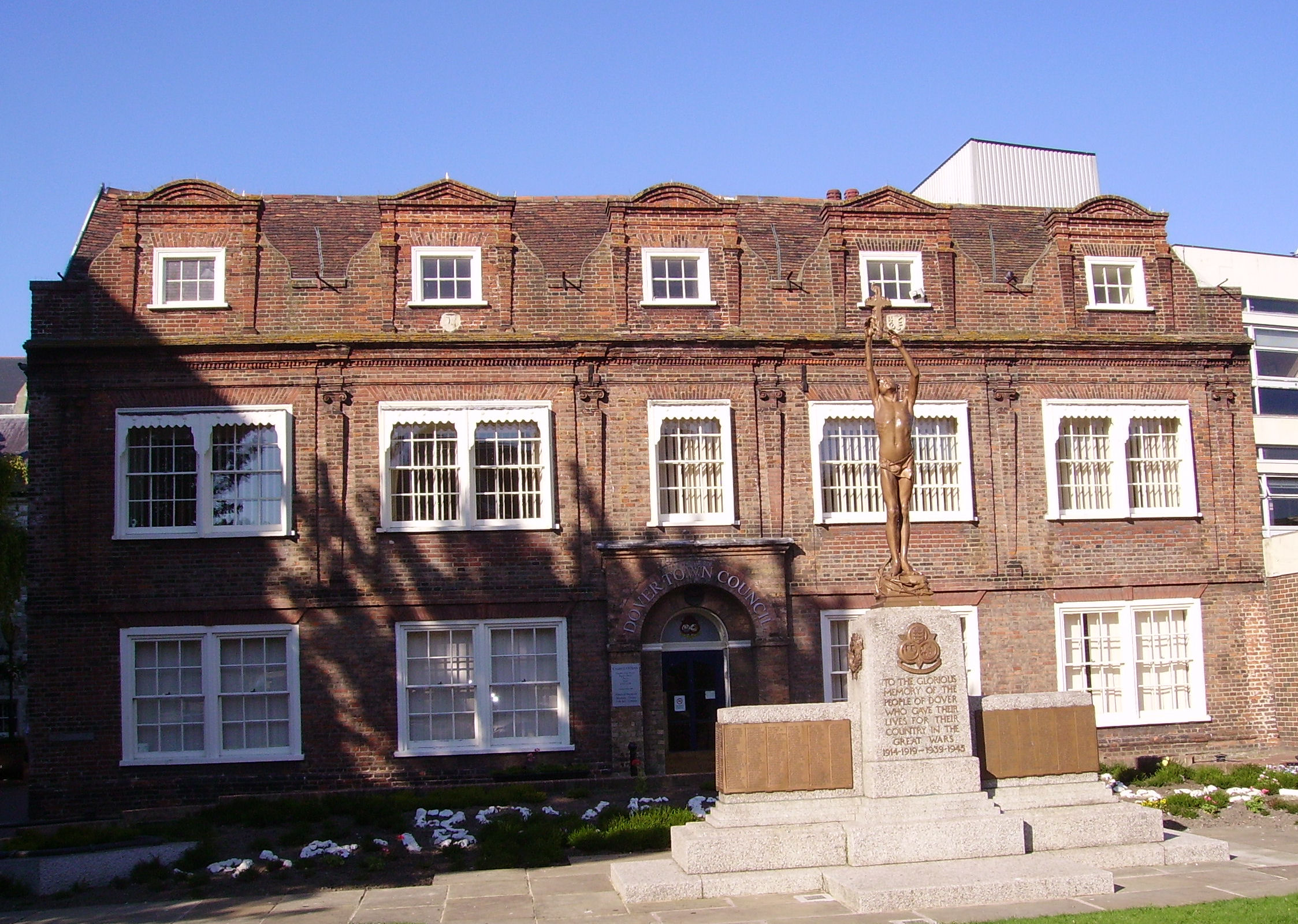
Maison Dieu House, dating from 1665.

Maison Dieu House was Grade II* listed in 1949. Maison Dieu House contains the offices of Dover Town Council, and its meetings are held there.

The Town Hall and remains of mediaeval Maison Dieu were Grade II* listed in 1973; Maison Dieu is also a Scheduled Monument. The Council Chamber ceased being used for council meetings in 1974, when the old municipal borough was abolished. The courtroom continued to serve as a Magistrates' Court until 1978.

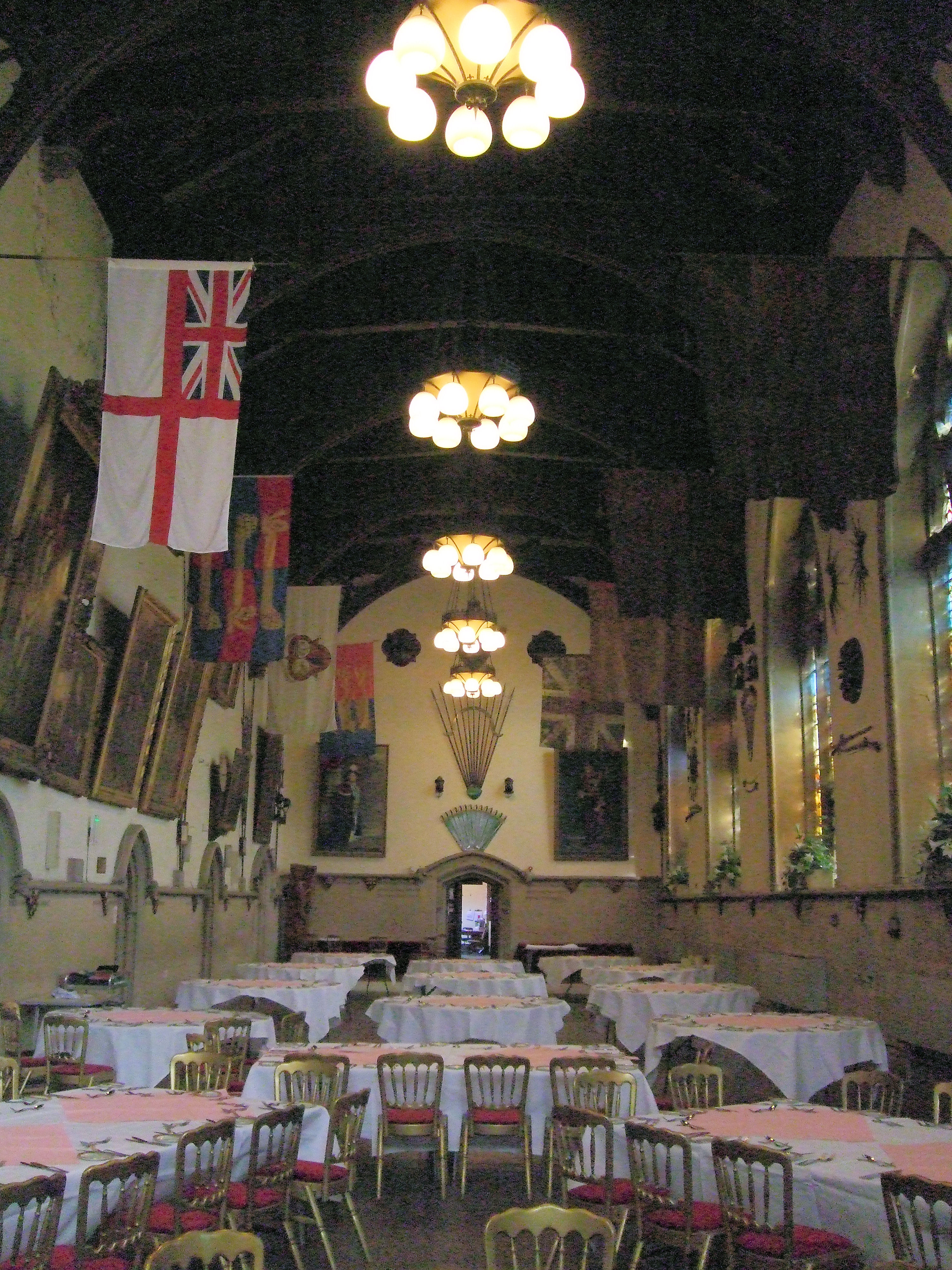
The Stone Hall set for a banquet in 2010.

The Maison Dieu itself continued to be used as one of the main meeting halls in Dover, as well as being open to public use for functions such as conferences, weddings, fairs, concerts, theatrical performances and (from the early 1990s) the annual White Cliffs Winter Ales Festival.

=== 21st century ===
Renovation work was begun in 2020 which uncovered much of Burges's decorative scheme, and plans were announced for its restoration and reinstatement. Following the award of a National Lottery Heritage Fund grant later that year, work began the following year on a comprehensive programme of building works. This aimed to bring redundant spaces back into commercial use: the Mayor’s Parlour was restored in conjunction with the Landmark Trust, with a view to it becoming a holiday let; and part of the former prison area under the Stone Hall was converted into a café. The work was completed in March 2025, and the Maison Dieu reopened to the public two months later, being 'for the first time in its history' free to enter and open seven days a week.
