= Listed buildings in the borough of Tonbridge and Malling, Kent =

There are about 1,300 listed Buildings in the borough of Tonbridge and Malling, which are buildings of architectural or historic interest.

- Grade I buildings are of exceptional interest.
- Grade II* buildings are particularly important buildings of more than special interest.
- Grade II buildings are of special interest.

The lists follow Historic England’s geographical organisation, with entries grouped by county, local authority, and parish (civil and non-civil). The following lists are arranged by parish.

Parish	Listed buildings list	Grade I	Grade II*	Grade II	Total
Addington, Kent	Listed buildings in Addington, Kent	1	1	15	17
Aylesford, Kent	Listed buildings in Aylesford	4	5	68	74
Birling	Listed buildings in Birling, Kent	1		12	13
Borough Green	Listed buildings in Borough Green			12	12
Burham	Listed buildings in Burham	1		5	6
Ditton, Kent	Listed buildings in Ditton, Kent		2	9	11
East Malling and Larkfield	Listed buildings in East Malling and Larkfield	4	5	65	74
East Peckham	Listed buildings in East Peckham		5	91	96
Hadlow	Listed buildings in Hadlow	2	9	111	122
Hildenborough	Listed buildings in Hildenborough		3	103	106
Ightham	Listed buildings in Ightham	2	4	55	61
Kings Hill	Listed buildings in Kings Hill			5	5
Leybourne	Listed buildings in Leybourne		2	6	8
Mereworth	Listed buildings in Mereworth	5		30	35
Offham	Listed buildings in Offham, Kent	1	3	33	37
Platt	Listed buildings in Platt, Kent		2	28	30
Plaxtol	Listed buildings in Plaxtol	2	5	61	68
Ryarsh	Listed buildings in Ryarsh		1	11	12
Shipbourne	Listed buildings in Shipbourne			24	24
Snodland	Listed buildings in Snodland	1	4	22	27
Stansted	Listed buildings in Stansted, Kent		3	8	11
Tonbridge non-civil	Listed buildings in Tonbridge	1	4	110	115
Trottiscliffe	Listed buildings in Trottiscliffe	1		23	24
Wateringbury	Listed buildings in Wateringbury		4	55	59
West Malling	Listed buildings in West Malling	7	11	153	171
West Peckham	Listed buildings in West Peckham	2	1	27	30
Wouldham	Listed buildings in Wouldham	2		5	7
Wrotham	Listed buildings in Wrotham	1	4	59	64
Total	—	38	78	1,218	1,334
