= Offham =

There are three villages named Offham in England:

- Offham, East Sussex, near Lewes
- Offham, Kent, near West Malling
- Offham, West Sussex, near Arundel
