= Ryarsh =

Village in Kent, England

Coordinates: 51.313650°N 0.394510°E

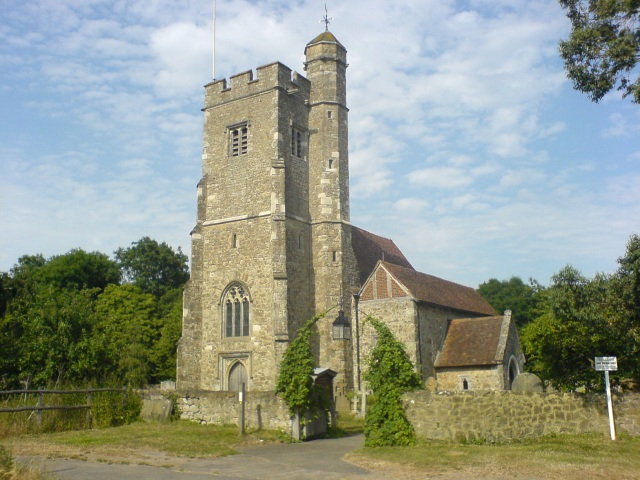
- St Martin's Church

- Location within Kent
- Population: 696 (2011 Census)
- District: Tonbridge and Malling
- Shire county: Kent
- Region: South East
- Country: England
- Sovereign state: United Kingdom
- Post town: West Malling
- Postcode district: ME 19
- Dialling code: 01732
- Police: Kent
- Fire: Kent
- Ambulance: South East Coast
- UK Parliament: Tonbridge

Ryarsh is a village and civil parish in the local government district of Tonbridge and Malling in Kent, England. It is home to around 1,000 residents. Ryarsh is west of Maidstone and north of West Malling.

== History ==
Ryarsh is believed to be a Saxon village dating from around 1050. At the time of the Domesday Book (1086) it was in the possession of Odo of Bayeux, half-brother of William the Conqueror. It then passed, by grant of the Crown, to the Crecy and Mowbray families but was confiscated from John de Mowbray who rebelled against the King in 1322. The manor of Ryarsh was then given to the Neville family, Earls of Abergavenny.

St Martin's church, on the south side of the M20, is a Grade II* listed building, with parts dating from the 12th century. Before the dissolution of the monasteries, it belonged to the Priors of Merton.

In December 2017, Kent County Council (KCC) received a proposal for a new 12-hectare quarry at Ryarsh that would extract 3.6 million tonnes of sand over a period of up to 24-years. It was strongly opposed by local residents, and in December 2018 KCC excluded the proposal from the county’s Minerals and Waste Local Plan, thereby rejecting the quarry plan. However, in early 2026 a fresh application was made to KCC to excavate over a million tons of sand from a 8.6-hectare site over 14-years, prompting a new local opposition campaign.

== Ryarsh Circle ==
The "Ryarsh Circle" are remains of a hill figure chalk circle. Little is known about it, but is believed to be manmade.

== Culture and community ==
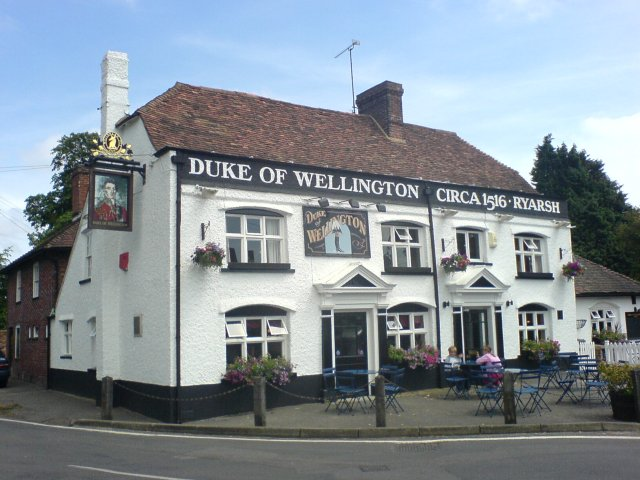
The Duke of Wellington pub, Ryarsh

The village public house is the Duke of Wellington. The village also has a community village hall and accompanying village green which hosts the annual fete, primary school and children's play area.

== Transport ==
Ryarsh is located close to the A20, M20 and M25. The closest railway stations are at West Malling for the Maidstone East Line and Snodland for the Medway Valley Line.

== Education ==
Ryarsh Primary School is located on Birling Road. There is no secondary school in the village, with most pupils transferring to schools in Maidstone, Sevenoaks, Tonbridge or Tunbridge Wells.

== Notable people ==
Celia Fremlin, novelist, was born in the village.

== See also ==
- Listed buildings in Ryarsh
