= Listed buildings in West Malling =

Civil Parish in Kent, England

West Malling is a town and civil parish in Kent, England. It contains 171 listed buildings that are recorded in the National Heritage List for England. Of these seven are grade I, eleven are grade II* and 153 are grade II.

This list is based on the information retrieved online from Historic England.

== Key ==
| Grade | Criteria |
|---|---|
| I | Buildings that are of exceptional interest |
| II* | Particularly important buildings of more than special interest |
| II | Buildings that are of special interest |

== Listing ==
| Name | Grade | Location | Type | Completed (Note: The date given is the date used by Historic England as significant for the initial building or that of an important part in the structure's description.) | Date designated | Grid ref. (Note: The grid reference is based on the British national grid reference system, sometimes known as OSGB36, used by the Ordnance Survey.) Geo-coordinates | Notes | Entry number (Note: The "List Entry Number" is a unique number assigned to each listed building and scheduled monument by Historic England.) | Image | Wikidata |
|---|---|---|---|---|---|---|---|---|---|---|
| Church of the Resurrection of Our Lord Jesus Christ and of the Blessed Virgin Mary , West Malling Abbey | II* | | | | 18 February 1999 | TQ6829757704; 51°17′37″N 0°24′45″E | | 1245579 | Upload Photo | Q17547005 |
| West Malling Station | II | | | | 9 November 2000 | TQ6874257540; 51°17′31″N 0°25′07″E | | 1268428 | West Malling Station More images | Q2053919 |
| 9 and 11, Frog Lane | II | 9 and 11, Frog Lane | | | 30 November 1993 | TQ6833657771; 51°17′39″N 0°24′47″E | | 1209077 | 9 and 11, Frog Lane More images | Q26504147 |
| West Malling Lodge | II | 34, Frog Lane | | | 30 November 1993 | TQ6837357853; 51°17′42″N 0°24′49″E | | 1209078 | Upload Photo | Q26504148 |
| The Bull Public House | II | 1, High Street | | | 30 November 1993 | TQ6810357973; 51°17′46″N 0°24′35″E | | 1209079 | The Bull Public House More images | Q26504149 |
| Clout's Memorial Hall | II | 9, High Street | | | 1 August 1952 | TQ6809557947; 51°17′45″N 0°24′35″E | | 1209080 | Clout's Memorial Hall More images | Q26504150 |
| 14 and 16, High Street | II | 14 and 16, High Street | | | 1 August 1952 | TQ6805357906; 51°17′44″N 0°24′32″E | | 1292844 | 14 and 16, High Street More images | Q26580828 |
| 15, High Street | II | 15, High Street | | | 1 August 1952 | TQ6809057934; 51°17′45″N 0°24′34″E | | 1209081 | 15, High Street More images | Q26504151 |
| 17, High Street | II | 17, High Street | | | 1 August 1952 | TQ6808757923; 51°17′44″N 0°24′34″E | | 1292845 | 17, High Street More images | Q26580829 |
| Abingdon House | II | 19-25, High Street | | | 1 August 1952 | TQ6809157908; 51°17′44″N 0°24′34″E | | 1209082 | Abingdon House More images | Q26504152 |
| 20, High Street | II | 20, High Street | | | 1 August 1952 | TQ6805057898; 51°17′43″N 0°24′32″E | | 1209083 | 20, High Street More images | Q26504153 |
| Kent County Library | II | 22-26, High Street | | | 1 August 1952 | TQ6804857886; 51°17′43″N 0°24′32″E | | 1292167 | Kent County Library More images | Q26580207 |
| 27 and 29, High Street | II | 27 and 29, High Street | | | 1 August 1952 | TQ6807857900; 51°17′44″N 0°24′34″E | | 1292846 | 27 and 29, High Street More images | Q26580830 |
| 28 and 30, High Street | II | 28 and 30, High Street | | | 1 August 1952 | TQ6804557877; 51°17′43″N 0°24′32″E | | 1292184 | 28 and 30, High Street More images | Q26580220 |
| 31-37, High Street | II | 31-37, High Street | | | 1 August 1952 | TQ6807457886; 51°17′43″N 0°24′33″E | | 1209084 | 31-37, High Street More images | Q26504155 |
| 32, High Street | II | 32, High Street | | | 30 November 1993 | TQ6804257869; 51°17′43″N 0°24′32″E | | 1218055 | 32, High Street More images | Q26512723 |
| The Assembly Rooms | II* | 36 and 38, High Street | | | 1 August 1952 | TQ6803957858; 51°17′42″N 0°24′32″E | | 1218061 | The Assembly Rooms More images | Q17546925 |
| 39-43, High Street | II | 39-43, High Street | | | 1 August 1952 | TQ6806757864; 51°17′42″N 0°24′33″E | | 1292847 | 39-43, High Street More images | Q26580831 |
| Rose and Crown Public House | II | 40, High Street | | | 1 August 1993 | TQ6803757850; 51°17′42″N 0°24′31″E | | 1218089 | Rose and Crown Public House | Q26512752 |
| 42 and 44, High Street | II | 42 and 44, High Street | | | 30 November 1993 | TQ6803657840; 51°17′42″N 0°24′31″E | | 1218096 | 42 and 44, High Street More images | Q26512759 |
| 47, High Street | II | 47, High Street | | | 1 August 1952 | TQ6808557854; 51°17′42″N 0°24′34″E | | 1209085 | Upload Photo | Q26504156 |
| 49 and 51, High Street | II | 49 and 51, High Street | | | 1 August 1952 | TQ6806257849; 51°17′42″N 0°24′33″E | | 1218103 | 49 and 51, High Street More images | Q26512765 |
| The Bakery Restaurant | II* | 53-57, High Street | | | 1 August 1952 | TQ6805857836; 51°17′41″N 0°24′33″E | | 1218117 | The Bakery Restaurant More images | Q17546928 |
| 54A, 56 and 58, High Street | II | 54A, 56 and 58, High Street | | | 1 August 1952 | TQ6802657817; 51°17′41″N 0°24′31″E | | 1292808 | 54A, 56 and 58, High Street More images | Q26580795 |
| 59 and 61, High Street | II | 59 and 61, High Street | | | 1 August 1952 | TQ6805857806; 51°17′40″N 0°24′32″E | | 1218137 | 59 and 61, High Street More images | Q26512796 |
| 62, High Street | II | 62, High Street | | | 1 August 1952 | TQ6802557796; 51°17′40″N 0°24′31″E | | 1209086 | 62, High Street More images | Q26504157 |
| 63 and 63A, High Street | II | 63 and 63A, High Street | | | 1 August 1952 | TQ6805657797; 51°17′40″N 0°24′32″E | | 1218141 | 63 and 63A, High Street More images | Q26512800 |
| The Joiners Arms Public House | II | 64 and 66, High Street | | | 1 August 1952 | TQ6802257789; 51°17′40″N 0°24′31″E | | 1209087 | The Joiners Arms Public House More images | Q26504158 |
| The Ancient House | I | 65 and 67, High Street | | | 1 August 1952 | TQ6805457787; 51°17′40″N 0°24′32″E | | 1292809 | The Ancient House More images | Q17530292 |
| 68 and 70, High Street | II | 68 and 70, High Street | | | 1 August 1952 | TQ6801657776; 51°17′40″N 0°24′30″E | | 1218167 | 68 and 70, High Street More images | Q26512825 |
| 69, High Street | II | 69, High Street | | | 1 August 1952 | TQ6805157777; 51°17′40″N 0°24′32″E | | 1218171 | 69, High Street More images | Q26512829 |
| 71 and 73, High Street | II | 71 and 73, High Street | | | 1 August 1952 | TQ6804857771; 51°17′39″N 0°24′32″E | | 1218173 | 71 and 73, High Street More images | Q26512831 |
| Industrial Building to Rear of 71 and 73 | II | 71 and 73, High Street | | | 30 November 1993 | TQ6806557767; 51°17′39″N 0°24′33″E | | 1218175 | Upload Photo | Q26512833 |
| 72, High Street | II | 72, High Street | | | 1 August 1952 | TQ6801557768; 51°17′39″N 0°24′30″E | | 1209088 | 72, High Street More images | Q26504159 |
| 75 and 77, High Street | II | 75 and 77, High Street | | | 1 August 1952 | TQ6804757764; 51°17′39″N 0°24′32″E | | 1292810 | 75 and 77, High Street More images | Q26580796 |
| 84, 84A and 86, High Street | II | 84, 84A and 86, High Street | | | 1 August 1952 | TQ6800057752; 51°17′39″N 0°24′29″E | | 1292811 | Upload Photo | Q26580797 |
| Andrew Smith Huntsman Stedham Stedham (85 and 97) Andrew Smith (89) Huntsman (91) And 83 IS the Flat Behind | II | 85 and 97, 89, 91 and 83, High Street | | | 30 November 1993 | TQ6803157722; 51°17′38″N 0°24′31″E | | 1209090 | Upload Photo | Q26504161 |
| Arundel House | II | 88, High Street | | | 1 August 1952 | TQ6799757742; 51°17′38″N 0°24′29″E | | 1209091 | Arundel House More images | Q26504162 |
| 95, High Street | II | 95, High Street | | | 1 August 1952 | TQ6802657713; 51°17′38″N 0°24′31″E | | 1292812 | Upload Photo | Q26580798 |
| Former Stables to Rear of Bear Hotel | II | 97, High Street | | | 30 November 1993 | TQ6805257702; 51°17′37″N 0°24′32″E | | 1292813 | Upload Photo | Q26580799 |
| Five Pointed Star Public House | II | 100 and 102, High Street | | | 1 August 1952 | TQ6798557709; 51°17′37″N 0°24′29″E | | 1209093 | Five Pointed Star Public House More images | Q26504164 |
| 101, High Street | II | 101, High Street | | | 1 August 1952 | TQ6801357689; 51°17′37″N 0°24′30″E | | 1209094 | Upload Photo | Q26504165 |
| 103 and 105, High Street | II | 103 and 105, High Street | | | 1 August 1952 | TQ6801157683; 51°17′37″N 0°24′30″E | | 1218286 | Upload Photo | Q26512927 |
| 104, High Street | II | 104, High Street | | | 1 August 1952 | TQ6798257696; 51°17′37″N 0°24′28″E | | 1292814 | 104, High Street More images | Q26580800 |
| 106, High Street | II | 106, High Street | | | 1 August 1952 | TQ6798057686; 51°17′37″N 0°24′28″E | | 1218295 | 106, High Street More images | Q26512935 |
| 107, High Street | II | 107, High Street | | | 1 August 1952 | TQ6800857678; 51°17′36″N 0°24′30″E | | 1209095 | 107, High Street More images | Q26504166 |
| 108, High Street | II | 108, High Street | | | 1 August 1952 | TQ6797857679; 51°17′36″N 0°24′28″E | | 1292047 | 108, High Street More images | Q26580101 |
| 110, High Street | II | 110, High Street | | | 1 August 1952 | TQ6797557673; 51°17′36″N 0°24′28″E | | 1209096 | 110, High Street More images | Q26504167 |
| Wistaria House | II | 112, High Street | | | 1 August 1952 | TQ6797257666; 51°17′36″N 0°24′28″E | | 1218305 | Wistaria House More images | Q26512945 |
| 115 and 117, High Street | II | 115 and 117, High Street | | | 1 August 1952 | TQ6799557644; 51°17′35″N 0°24′29″E | | 1292015 | Upload Photo | Q26580074 |
| Milverton House | II | 116, High Street | | | 1 August 1952 | TQ6796557651; 51°17′36″N 0°24′27″E | | 1209097 | Milverton House More images | Q26504168 |
| Lucknow | II | 119, High Street | | | 1 August 1992 | TQ6799157635; 51°17′35″N 0°24′29″E | | 1209098 | Lucknow More images | Q26504169 |
| 123, High Street | II | 123, High Street | | | 25 August 1959 | TQ6798257619; 51°17′35″N 0°24′28″E | | 1218313 | 123, High Street More images | Q26512952 |
| Forsters | II | 124, High Street | | | 1 August 1952 | TQ6795957635; 51°17′35″N 0°24′27″E | | 1218319 | Forsters More images | Q26512958 |
| Old Vicarage | II | 126, High Street | | | 1 August 1952 | TQ6794757626; 51°17′35″N 0°24′26″E | | 1209099 | Old Vicarage More images | Q26504170 |
| 127, High Street | II | 127, High Street | | | 1 August 1952 | TQ6797457609; 51°17′34″N 0°24′28″E | | 1209101 | 127, High Street More images | Q26504173 |
| Street House | II | 128, High Street | | | 1 August 1952 | TQ6795457610; 51°17′34″N 0°24′27″E | | 1218348 | Street House More images | Q26512985 |
| Tudor Cottage | II | 134, High Street | | | 1 August 1952 | TQ6794857588; 51°17′34″N 0°24′26″E | | 1218352 | Tudor Cottage More images | Q26512989 |
| Tudor House | II | 136, High Street | | | 1 August 1952 | TQ6794357576; 51°17′33″N 0°24′26″E | | 1209102 | Tudor House More images | Q26504174 |
| Church House | II | 137, High Street | | | 1 August 1952 | TQ6796757554; 51°17′32″N 0°24′27″E | | 1218364 | Church House More images | Q26513001 |
| Stable to the Vicarage (Vicarage Not Included) | II | 138, High Street | | | 30 November 1993 | TQ6790757621; 51°17′35″N 0°24′24″E | | 1218367 | Upload Photo | Q26513004 |
| Brome House | II* | 148, High Street | | | 1 August 1952 | TQ6793357516; 51°17′31″N 0°24′26″E | | 1209103 | Brome House More images | Q17546907 |
| Coach House to Brome House | II | 148, High Street | | | 30 November 1993 | TQ6796457491; 51°17′30″N 0°24′27″E | | 1209104 | Coach House to Brome House More images | Q26504175 |
| Bollard Opposite No 18 (The Priors) | II | High Street | | | 30 November 1993 | TQ6803857900; 51°17′44″N 0°24′32″E | | 1292823 | Upload Photo | Q26580808 |
| Boundary Wall to Brome House | II | High Street | | | 30 November 1993 | TQ6794957514; 51°17′31″N 0°24′26″E | | 1218374 | Upload Photo | Q26513012 |
| Parish Church of St Mary the Virgin | II* | High Street | | | 25 August 1959 | TQ6789957538; 51°17′32″N 0°24′24″E | | 1292816 | Parish Church of St Mary the Virgin More images | Q17547060 |
| Chest tomb 0.5 metre south of east-most buttress to nave of Parish Church of St Mary the Virgin | II | High Street | | | 30 November 1993 | TQ6789957527; 51°17′32″N 0°24′24″E | | 1218427 | Upload Photo | Q26513059 |
| Chest tomb 0.5 metre west of List entry 1292818, south of Parish Church of St Mary the Virgin | II | High Street | | | 30 November 1993 | TQ6789057529; 51°17′32″N 0°24′23″E | | 1218447 | Chest tomb 0.5 metre west of List entry 1292818, south of Parish Church of St Mary the Virgin More images | Q26513074 |
| Chest tomb approximately 0.5 metre west of List entry 1209107, south of Parish Church of St Mary the Virgin | II | High Street | | | 30 November 1993 | TQ6789257527; 51°17′32″N 0°24′23″E | | 1292818 | Chest tomb approximately 0.5 metre west of List entry 1209107, south of Parish Church of St Mary the Virgin More images | Q26580803 |
| Chest tomb approximately 1 metre south of List entry 1209107, south of Parish Church of St Mary the Virgin | II | High Street | | | 30 November 1993 | TQ6789457523; 51°17′32″N 0°24′24″E | | 1291954 | Chest tomb approximately 1 metre south of List entry 1209107, south of Parish Church of St Mary the Virgin More images | Q26580017 |
| Chest tomb approximately 1 metre south of nave of Parish Church of St Mary the Virgin | II | High Street | | | 30 November 1993 | TQ6790257526; 51°17′32″N 0°24′24″E | | 1209106 | Chest tomb approximately 1 metre south of nave of Parish Church of St Mary the Virgin More images | Q26504177 |
| Chest tomb approximately 10 metres south of nave of Parish Church of St Mary the Virgin | II | High Street | | | 30 November 1993 | TQ6790157518; 51°17′31″N 0°24′24″E | | 1291990 | Chest tomb approximately 10 metres south of nave of Parish Church of St Mary the Virgin More images | Q26580050 |
| Chest tomb approximately 25 metres south of nave of Parish Church of St Mary the Virgin | II | High Street | | | 30 November 1993 | TQ6788357485; 51°17′30″N 0°24′23″E | | 1292817 | Chest tomb approximately 25 metres south of nave of Parish Church of St Mary the Virgin More images | Q26580802 |
| Chest tomb approximately 3 metres south of nave of Parish Church of St Mary the Virgin | II | High Street | | | 30 November 1993 | TQ6789557526; 51°17′32″N 0°24′24″E | | 1209107 | Chest tomb approximately 3 metres south of nave of Parish Church of St Mary the Virgin More images | Q26504178 |
| Chest tomb approximately 6 metres south of Grahame Monument, Parish Church of St Mary the Virgin | II | High Street | | | 30 November 1993 | TQ6786657509; 51°17′31″N 0°24′22″E | | 1209110 | Chest tomb approximately 6 metres south of Grahame Monument, Parish Church of St Mary the Virgin More images | Q26504181 |
| Downman Monument 1 metre south of Frazer Monument, Parish Church of St Mary the Virgin | II | High Street | | | 30 November 1993 | TQ6786457483; 51°17′30″N 0°24′22″E | | 1292820 | Upload Photo | Q26580805 |
| Downman Monument approximately 15 metres south of Honywood Monument, Parish Church of St Mary the Virgin | II | High Street | | | 30 November 1993 | TQ6786657485; 51°17′30″N 0°24′22″E | | 1218595 | Downman Monument approximately 15 metres south of Honywood Monument, Parish Church of St Mary the Virgin More images | Q26513215 |
| Duplow Monument approximately 3 metres south of List entry 1209110, south west of Parish Church of St Mary the Virgin | II | High Street | | | 30 November 1993 | TQ6786557503; 51°17′31″N 0°24′22″E | | 1218609 | Duplow Monument approximately 3 metres south of List entry 1209110, south west of Parish Church of St Mary the Virgin More images | Q26513226 |
| Frazer Monument approximately 3 metres south of Duplow Monument, Parish Church of St Mary the Virgin | II | High Street | | | 30 November 1993 | TQ6785957485; 51°17′30″N 0°24′22″E | | 1209109 | Frazer Monument approximately 3 metres south of Duplow Monument, Parish Church of St Mary the Virgin More images | Q26504180 |
| Grahame Monument approximately 15 metres south of west tower of Parish Church of St Mary the Virgin | II | High Street | | | 30 November 1993 | TQ6787057518; 51°17′31″N 0°24′22″E | | 1292819 | Grahame Monument approximately 15 metres south of west tower of Parish Church of St Mary the Virgin More images | Q26580804 |
| Honywood Monument approximately 20 metres south of south aisle of Parish Church of St Mary the Virgin | II | High Street | | | 30 November 1993 | TQ6787557506; 51°17′31″N 0°24′23″E | | 1209108 | Honywood Monument approximately 20 metres south of south aisle of Parish Church of St Mary the Virgin More images | Q26504179 |
| Monument to James Godfrey approximately 30 metres north of chancel of Parish Church of St Mary the Virgin | II | High Street | | | 30 November 1993 | TQ6792157548; 51°17′32″N 0°24′25″E | | 1209105 | Upload Photo | Q26504176 |
| Monument to Thomas Holebin 7 metres south of west wall of south aisle of Parish Church of St Mary the Virgin | II | High Street | | | 30 November 1993 | TQ6788257525; 51°17′32″N 0°24′23″E | | 1291880 | Monument to Thomas Holebin 7 metres south of west wall of south aisle of Parish Church of St Mary the Virgin More images | Q26579951 |
| Warne Monument 15 metres north of west tower of Parish Church of St Mary the Virgin | II | High Street | | | 30 November 1993 | TQ6789457568; 51°17′33″N 0°24′24″E | | 1218414 | Warne Monument 15 metres north of west tower of Parish Church of St Mary the Virgin More images | Q26513047 |
| Ice House North of the Lake Manor Park | II | High Street | | | 22 April 2010 | TQ6801057345; 51°17′26″N 0°24′29″E | | 1393757 | Upload Photo | Q26672901 |
| K6 Telephone Kiosk | II | High Street | | | 27 January 1988 | TQ6799857716; 51°17′38″N 0°24′29″E | | 1209111 | K6 Telephone Kiosk More images | Q26504182 |
| Outbuilding to Rear of Five Pointed Star Public House | II | High Street | | | 30 November 1993 | TQ6796457700; 51°17′37″N 0°24′27″E | | 1292036 | Upload Photo | Q26580092 |
| Outbuilding to Rear of Nos 81-87 | II | High Street | | | 30 November 1993 | TQ6804757727; 51°17′38″N 0°24′32″E | | 1209089 | Upload Photo | Q26504160 |
| Railings Gate and Wall to Went House | II | High Street | | | 30 November 1993 | TQ6833557724; 51°17′38″N 0°24′47″E | | 1209133 | Upload Photo | Q26504202 |
| Railings to Old Vicarage | II | High Street | | | 30 November 1993 | TQ6796257622; 51°17′35″N 0°24′27″E | | 1292017 | Upload Photo | Q26580076 |
| Railings to Parish Church of St Mary the Virgin | II | High Street | | | 30 November 1993 | TQ6794057546; 51°17′32″N 0°24′26″E | | 1291984 | Railings to Parish Church of St Mary the Virgin More images | Q26580044 |
| Town Pump Situated Opposite Old Vicarage | II | High Street | | | 30 November 1993 | TQ6796257617; 51°17′34″N 0°24′27″E | | 1209100 | Town Pump Situated Opposite Old Vicarage More images | Q26504171 |
| Wall and Gatepiers to Church House | II | High Street | | | 30 November 1993 | TQ6795457539; 51°17′32″N 0°24′27″E | | 1292815 | Wall and Gatepiers to Church House More images | Q26580801 |
| West Malling War Memorial | II | High Street | | | 20 March 2017 | TQ6793857543; 51°17′32″N 0°24′26″E | | 1444565 | West Malling War Memorial More images | Q66478640 |
| 2, 4 and 6, King Street | II | 2, 4 and 6, King Street | | | 30 November 1993 | TQ6805657941; 51°17′45″N 0°24′33″E | | 1292821 | 2, 4 and 6, King Street More images | Q26580806 |
| Forge Cottages, Forge House | II | 12 and 14, King Street | | | 1 August 1952 | TQ6804257918; 51°17′44″N 0°24′32″E | | 1209112 | Forge Cottages, Forge House More images | Q26504183 |
| Prior's Cottage the Priors | II* | 18, King Street | | | 30 November 1993 | TQ6803257904; 51°17′44″N 0°24′31″E | | 1209113 | Prior's Cottage the Priors More images | Q17546916 |
| 26 and 28, King Street | II | 26 and 28, King Street | | | 30 November 1993 | TQ6801757880; 51°17′43″N 0°24′30″E | | 1209114 | 26 and 28, King Street More images | Q26504184 |
| 30 and 32, King Street | II | 30 and 32, King Street | | | 30 November 1993 | TQ6801457870; 51°17′43″N 0°24′30″E | | 1218698 | 30 and 32, King Street More images | Q26513310 |
| 34, King Street | II | 34, King Street | | | 30 November 1993 | TQ6801357860; 51°17′42″N 0°24′30″E | | 1209115 | 34, King Street More images | Q26504185 |
| Avicia Cottage | II | 36, King Street | | | 30 November 1993 | TQ6801257854; 51°17′42″N 0°24′30″E | | 1218719 | Avicia Cottage More images | Q26513330 |
| Store Adjoining Avicia Cottage | II | 38, King Street | | | 30 November 1993 | TQ6800957848; 51°17′42″N 0°24′30″E | | 1218722 | Store Adjoining Avicia Cottage More images | Q26513333 |
| 46, King Street | II | 46, King Street | | | 30 November 1993 | TQ6800357771; 51°17′39″N 0°24′30″E | | 1209116 | 46, King Street More images | Q26504187 |
| Bear Hotel | II | King Street | | | 1 August 1952 | TQ6802057703; 51°17′37″N 0°24′30″E | | 1209092 | Bear Hotel More images | Q26504163 |
| Bollard Opposite No 16 (Prior's Cottage) | II | King Street | | | 30 November 1993 | TQ6804157906; 51°17′44″N 0°24′32″E | | 1292822 | Upload Photo | Q26580807 |
| Building to Rear of Nos 36 and 38 High Street | II | King Street | | | 30 November 1993 | TQ6802757862; 51°17′42″N 0°24′31″E | | 1292824 | Upload Photo | Q26580809 |
| The Lavenders | II | 41, Lavenders Road | | | 30 November 1993 | TQ6827957408; 51°17′27″N 0°24′43″E | | 1291806 | Upload Photo | Q26579883 |
| New Barns | II | Lavenders Road | | | 1 August 1952 | TQ6838256637; 51°17′02″N 0°24′47″E | | 1292825 | Upload Photo | Q26580810 |
| Garden Wall at the Hermitage | II | Lucks Hill | | | 30 November 1993 | TQ6875057897; 51°17′43″N 0°25′08″E | | 1291811 | Upload Photo | Q26579888 |
| Stable and Coach House at the Hermitage | II | Lucks Hill | | | 30 November 1993 | TQ6872557916; 51°17′43″N 0°25′07″E | | 1209117 | Upload Photo | Q26504188 |
| The Hermitage | II | Lucks Hill | | | 1 August 1952 | TQ6869657891; 51°17′43″N 0°25′06″E | | 1218755 | Upload Photo | Q26513363 |
| Puckle Cottage | II | 91, Norman Road | | | 30 November 1993 | TQ6747757877; 51°17′43″N 0°24′03″E | | 1218795 | Upload Photo | Q26513400 |
| 147-165, Norman Road | II | 147-165, Norman Road | | | 30 November 1993 | TQ6733158024; 51°17′48″N 0°23′55″E | | 1209119 | Upload Photo | Q26504190 |
| 2-8, Police Station Road | II | 2-8, Police Station Road | | | 30 November 1993 | TQ6818257806; 51°17′40″N 0°24′39″E | | 1218797 | 2-8, Police Station Road More images | Q26513401 |
| 5 and 7, Police Station Road | II | 5 and 7, Police Station Road | | | 30 November 1993 | TQ6817957831; 51°17′41″N 0°24′39″E | | 1209120 | 5 and 7, Police Station Road More images | Q26504191 |
| Brook Cottage | II | 14, Police Station Road | | | 30 November 1993 | TQ6819157827; 51°17′41″N 0°24′39″E | | 1219030 | Brook Cottage More images | Q26513603 |
| Water Pump Opposite No 14 | II | Police Station Road | | | 30 November 1993 | TQ6818857823; 51°17′41″N 0°24′39″E | | 1209121 | Water Pump Opposite No 14 More images | Q26504192 |
| Lodge to Douce's Manor | II | 16, St Leonard's Street | | | 30 November 1993 | TQ6791957412; 51°17′28″N 0°24′25″E | | 1291671 | Upload Photo | Q26579763 |
| Douce's Manor | II* | 60, St Leonard's Street | | | 1 August 1952 | TQ6774357320; 51°17′25″N 0°24′15″E | | 1209122 | Douce's Manor More images | Q17546921 |
| Forge House | II | 115, St Leonard's Street | | | 30 November 1993 | TQ6764157019; 51°17′15″N 0°24′10″E | | 1292826 | Upload Photo | Q26580811 |
| Yew Tree Cottage | II* | 181, St Leonard's Street | | | 1 August 1952 | TQ6746256775; 51°17′08″N 0°24′00″E | | 1291654 | Upload Photo | Q17547046 |
| Park Cottages | II | 101-107, St Leonard's Street | | | 30 November 1993 | TQ6767357065; 51°17′17″N 0°24′11″E | | 1209123 | Upload Photo | Q26504193 |
| 114 and 116, St Leonard's Street | II | 114 and 116, St Leonard's Street | | | 30 November 1993 | TQ6762557016; 51°17′15″N 0°24′09″E | | 1219069 | Upload Photo | Q26513638 |
| Chestnuts | II | St Leonard's Street | | | 1 August 1952 | TQ6758456912; 51°17′12″N 0°24′07″E | | 1209124 | Upload Photo | Q26504194 |
| Malling Place | II* | St Leonard's Street | | | 1 August 1952 | TQ6763257142; 51°17′19″N 0°24′09″E | | 1219060 | Upload Photo | Q17546934 |
| Old Gatepiers to Malling Place | II | St Leonard's Street | | | 30 November 1993 | TQ6768157163; 51°17′20″N 0°24′12″E | | 1219072 | Upload Photo | Q26513640 |
| St Leonard's House | II | St Leonard's Street | | | 1 August 1952 | TQ6753456856; 51°17′10″N 0°24′04″E | | 1209125 | Upload Photo | Q26504195 |
| St Leonard's Tower | I | St Leonard's Street | | | 30 November 1993 | TQ6759557082; 51°17′18″N 0°24′07″E | | 1219087 | St Leonard's Tower More images | Q24661828 |
| 1 and 3, Swan Street | II | 1 and 3, Swan Street | | | 1 August 1952 | TQ6805457827; 51°17′41″N 0°24′32″E | | 1292827 | 1 and 3, Swan Street More images | Q26580812 |
| Swan Mill | II | 10A, Swan Street | | | 30 November 1993 | TQ6807057786; 51°17′40″N 0°24′33″E | | 1209118 | Upload Photo | Q26504189 |
| 18-24, Swan Street | II | 18-24, Swan Street | | | 30 November 1993 | TQ6809557801; 51°17′40″N 0°24′34″E | | 1219145 | 18-24, Swan Street More images | Q26513708 |
| 23-27 Swan Street | II | 23-27, Swan Street | | | 1 March 1990 | TQ6809957819; 51°17′41″N 0°24′35″E | | 1209126 | 23-27 Swan Street More images | Q26504196 |
| Abbey Gate House | II | 41, Swan Street | | | 1 August 1952 | TQ6814257811; 51°17′41″N 0°24′37″E | | 1219148 | Abbey Gate House More images | Q26513711 |
| Brook House | II | 43, Swan Street | | | 1 August 1952 | TQ6815157807; 51°17′40″N 0°24′37″E | | 1292788 | Upload Photo | Q26580778 |
| The Lobster Pot | II | 47, Swan Street | | | 1 August 1952 | TQ6816257799; 51°17′40″N 0°24′38″E | | 1219157 | The Lobster Pot More images | Q26513720 |
| 49-53, Swan Street | II | 49-53, Swan Street | | | 1 August 1952 | TQ6817957790; 51°17′40″N 0°24′39″E | | 1209127 | 49-53, Swan Street More images | Q26504197 |
| Abbey Cottage Including Forecourt Wall | II | 55, Swan Street | | | 1 August 1952 | TQ6819457787; 51°17′40″N 0°24′39″E | | 1219161 | Abbey Cottage Including Forecourt Wall More images | Q26513724 |
| Abbey View House Including Forecourt Wall | II | 61, Swan Street | | | 30 November 1993 | TQ6821557782; 51°17′40″N 0°24′41″E | | 1209128 | Abbey View House Including Forecourt Wall More images | Q26504198 |
| Abbey Brewery Cottage | II | 75 and 77, Swan Street | | | 30 November 1993 | TQ6828157759; 51°17′39″N 0°24′44″E | | 1291585 | Abbey Brewery Cottage More images | Q26579686 |
| Forecourt Wall to Nos 75 and 77 | II | 75 and 77, Swan Street | | | 30 November 1993 | TQ6827957750; 51°17′38″N 0°24′44″E | | 1292789 | Upload Photo | Q26580779 |
| Cade House | II | 79, Swan Street | | | 1 August 1952 | TQ6830157756; 51°17′39″N 0°24′45″E | | 1219173 | Cade House More images | Q26513736 |
| Forecourt and Wall to No 79 (Cade House) | II | 79, Swan Street | | | 30 November 1993 | TQ6829657745; 51°17′38″N 0°24′45″E | | 1209129 | Upload Photo | Q26504199 |
| Forecourt Wall to West Malling Free Church | II | Swan Street | | | 30 November 1993 | TQ6822457768; 51°17′39″N 0°24′41″E | | 1292790 | Upload Photo | Q26580780 |
| Gatehouse and Chapel to St Mary's Abbey | I | Swan Street | | | 25 August 1959 | TQ6822257740; 51°17′38″N 0°24′41″E | | 1209130 | Gatehouse and Chapel to St Mary's Abbey More images | Q17530264 |
| Icm Offices | II | Swan Street | | | 1 August 1952 | TQ6826957755; 51°17′39″N 0°24′43″E | | 1291598 | Icm Offices More images | Q26579697 |
| St Marys Abbey Convent Building | I | Swan Street | | | 25 August 1959 | TQ6827157667; 51°17′36″N 0°24′43″E | | 1209132 | Upload Photo | Q99646344 |
| St Mary's Abbey Guesthouse | II | Swan Street | | | 25 August 1959 | TQ6823557698; 51°17′37″N 0°24′41″E | | 1219252 | Upload Photo | Q26513807 |
| St Mary's Abbey North Wall of Cloister | I | Swan Street | | | 25 August 1959 | TQ6827557692; 51°17′37″N 0°24′43″E | | 1291527 | Upload Photo | Q17530286 |
| St Mary's Abbey Refectory | II | Swan Street | | | 25 August 1959 | TQ6825757686; 51°17′36″N 0°24′43″E | | 1209131 | Upload Photo | Q26504200 |
| St Mary's Abbey Tower to Original Abbey | I | Swan Street | | | 25 August 1959 | TQ6826257703; 51°17′37″N 0°24′43″E | | 1292791 | Upload Photo | Q17530289 |
| St Mary's Abbey, Chapterhouse and Library | I | Swan Street | | | 25 August 1959 | TQ6829157677; 51°17′36″N 0°24′44″E | | 1291520 | Upload Photo | Q17530283 |
| Stabling to North East of Went House | II | Swan Street | | | 30 November 1993 | TQ6835557767; 51°17′39″N 0°24′48″E | | 1219408 | Stabling to North East of Went House More images | Q26513954 |
| Swan Hotel | II | Swan Street | | | 1 August 1952 | TQ6812057816; 51°17′41″N 0°24′36″E | | 1219371 | Swan Hotel More images | Q26513923 |
| The Cascade | II | Swan Street | | | 30 November 1993 | TQ6828657734; 51°17′38″N 0°24′44″E | | 1292792 | The Cascade More images | Q26580781 |
| Went House | II* | Swan Street | | | 1 August 1952 | TQ6833857741; 51°17′38″N 0°24′47″E | | 1219391 | Went House More images | Q17546938 |
| West Malling Free Church | II | Swan Street | | | 30 November 1993 | TQ6823457789; 51°17′40″N 0°24′42″E | | 1291591 | West Malling Free Church More images | Q26579691 |
| Brewery Cottages | II | 1, 2 and 3, Town Hill | | | 1 August 1952 | TQ6811758009; 51°17′47″N 0°24′36″E | | 1292793 | Brewery Cottages More images | Q26580782 |
| Rose Cottage | II | 38, Town Hill | | | 30 November 1993 | TQ6813658088; 51°17′50″N 0°24′37″E | | 1219413 | Rose Cottage More images | Q26513959 |
| Hill House | II | 46, Town Hill | | | 30 November 1993 | TQ6812258068; 51°17′49″N 0°24′36″E | | 1209134 | Hill House More images | Q26504203 |
| Town Hill Cottage | II | 58, Town Hill | | | 9 June 1993 | TQ6809958030; 51°17′48″N 0°24′35″E | | 1219422 | Town Hill Cottage More images | Q26513968 |
| Top Hill House | II | Town Hill | | | 30 November 1993 | TQ6810358036; 51°17′48″N 0°24′35″E | | 1209135 | Top Hill House More images | Q26504204 |
| Old Parsonage Court | II | 1, 2 and 3, Water Lane | | | 30 November 1993 | TQ6802457509; 51°17′31″N 0°24′30″E | | 1218382 | Upload Photo | Q26513019 |
| Ewell Monastery Guesthouse | II | 21 abd 23, Water Lane | | | 30 November 1993 | TQ6812557544; 51°17′32″N 0°24′35″E | | 1219433 | Upload Photo | Q26513978 |
| Ewell Monastery the Abbey Tithe Barn | II* | Water Lane | | | 30 November 1993 | TQ6813257518; 51°17′31″N 0°24′36″E | | 1292794 | Ewell Monastery the Abbey Tithe Barn | Q17547052 |
| 2, 4 and 6, West Street | II | 2, 4 and 6, West Street | | | 26 March 1984 | TQ6799657768; 51°17′39″N 0°24′29″E | | 1219462 | 2, 4 and 6, West Street More images | Q26514006 |
| 5, West Street | II | 5, West Street | | | 30 November 1993 | TQ6796657756; 51°17′39″N 0°24′28″E | | 1209136 | 5, West Street More images | Q26504206 |
| 8 and 10, West Street | II | 8 and 10, West Street | | | 30 November 1993 | TQ6798357766; 51°17′39″N 0°24′29″E | | 1219481 | 8 and 10, West Street More images | Q26514023 |
| 12, West Street | II | 12, West Street | | | 30 November 1993 | TQ6797857766; 51°17′39″N 0°24′28″E | | 1292795 | 12, West Street More images | Q26580783 |
| Kingsworth House | II | 16, West Street | | | 30 November 1993 | TQ6796357773; 51°17′40″N 0°24′28″E | | 1219485 | Kingsworth House More images | Q26514027 |
| Outbuilding to Rear of No 16 | II | West Street | | | 30 November 1993 | TQ6797457784; 51°17′40″N 0°24′28″E | | 1209137 | Upload Photo | Q26504207 |
| The White Cottage | II | West Street | | | 30 November 1993 | TQ6795457775; 51°17′40″N 0°24′27″E | | 1219499 | The White Cottage More images | Q26514040 |

== See also ==
- Grade I listed buildings in Kent
- Grade II* listed buildings in Kent

== Sources ==
- Newman, John (2012) [1969], Kent: West and the Weald, The Buildings of England, New Haven and London: Yale University Press, ISBN 978-0-300-18509-6
