= Listed buildings in Ditton, Kent =

Civil Parish in Kent, England

Ditton is a village and civil parish in the Tonbridge and Malling district of Kent, England. It contains eleven listed buildings that are recorded in the National Heritage List for England. Of these two are grade II* and nine are grade II.

This list is based on the information retrieved online from Historic England.

== Key ==
Grade	Criteria
I	Buildings that are of exceptional interest
II*	Particularly important buildings of more than special interest
II	Buildings that are of special interest

== Listing ==
Name	Grade	Location	Type	Completed (Note: The date given is the date used by Historic England as significant for the initial building or that of an important part in the structure's description.)	Date designated	Grid ref. (Note: The grid reference is based on the British national grid reference system, sometimes known as OSGB36, used by the Ordnance Survey.) Geo-coordinates	Notes	Entry number (Note: The "List Entry Number" is a unique number assigned to each listed building and scheduled monument by Historic England.)	Image	Wikidata
Milepost on A20 London Road at Ditton, Kent	II	476 London Road, ME20 6BZ			25 October 2011	TQ7155158319; 51°17′53″N 0°27′34″E		1404161	Upload Photo	Q26675677
War Memorial	II		war memorial		27 November 2000	TQ7126858367; 51°17′55″N 0°27′19″E		1271153	War Memorial More images	Q26561134
Finnish Olympic Sauna	II	Aylesford, ME20 6DD			15 January 2024	TQ7112858678; 51°18′05″N 0°27′12″E		1487251	Upload Photo	Q124325400
578-580, London Road	II	578-580, London Road			25 February 1987	TQ7102958491; 51°17′59″N 0°27′07″E		1099192	Upload Photo	Q26391343
The Clifford Sheldon Club House	II	London Road			25 February 1987	TQ7107658524; 51°18′00″N 0°27′09″E		1070525	Upload Photo	Q26324486
Church of St Peter Ad Vincula	II*	New Road	church building		25 August 1959	TQ7098658048; 51°17′45″N 0°27′04″E		1099197	Church of St Peter Ad Vincula More images	Q17546855
Golding Tomb 15 Yards South of Ditton Church	II	New Road			25 February 1987	TQ7098258035; 51°17′45″N 0°27′04″E		1070526	Upload Photo	Q26324488
Golding Tomb 20 Yards South East of the Chancel of Ditton Church	II	New Road			25 February 1987	TQ7099758030; 51°17′45″N 0°27′04″E		1099199	Upload Photo	Q26391348
40, the Stream	II	40, The Stream			11 December 1975	TQ7100458169; 51°17′49″N 0°27′05″E		1363101	Upload Photo	Q26644947
Stream Cottages	II*	44-48, The Stream			25 February 1987	TQ7100158162; 51°17′49″N 0°27′05″E		1070527	Upload Photo	Q17546791
The Old Mill House	II	The Stream			14 February 1977	TQ7095858154; 51°17′49″N 0°27′03″E		1349055	Upload Photo	Q26632378

== See also ==
- Grade I listed buildings in Kent
- Grade II* listed buildings in Kent

== Sources ==
- Newman, John (2012) [1969], Kent: West and the Weald, The Buildings of England, New Haven and London: Yale University Press, ISBN 978-0-300-18509-6
