= Listed buildings in Hadlow =

Historic structures in Kent, England

Hadlow is village and civil parish in Kent, England. It contains 115 listed buildings that are recorded in the National Heritage List for England. Of these two are grade I, nine are grade II* and 111 are grade II.

This list is based on the information retrieved online from Historic England.

== Key ==
Grade	Criteria
I	Buildings that are of exceptional interest
II*	Particularly important buildings of more than special interest
II	Buildings that are of special interest

== Listing ==
Name	Grade	Location	Type	Completed (Note: The date given is the date used by Historic England as significant for the initial building or that of an important part in the structure's description.)	Date designated	Grid ref. (Note: The grid reference is based on the British national grid reference system, sometimes known as OSGB36, used by the Ordnance Survey.) Geo-coordinates	Notes	Entry number (Note: The "List Entry Number" is a unique number assigned to each listed building and scheduled monument by Historic England.)	Image	Wikidata
Hadlow War Memorial	II				13 May 1998	TQ6398650361; 51°13′44″N 0°20′50″E		1119743	Hadlow War Memorial More images	Q26413038
1 and 2 Easterfield Cottages	II	1 and 2, Easterfield Cottages			19 February 1990	TQ6327848439; 51°12′43″N 0°20′11″E		1247909	Upload Photo	Q26540170
Barn Approximately 30 Metres North of the Poult House	II	Ashes Lane			19 February 1990	TQ6117849704; 51°13′26″N 0°18′24″E		1070462	Upload Photo	Q26324366
Farmbuildings Adjoining to North of North Frith Farmhouse Including Long Barn	II	Ashes Lane			19 February 1990	TQ6120050523; 51°13′52″N 0°18′27″E		1070460	Upload Photo	Q26324362
Granary Approximately 250 Metres West of North Frith Farmhouse	II	Ashes Lane			19 February 1990	TQ6116350546; 51°13′53″N 0°18′25″E		1236762	Upload Photo	Q26529964
Grimbles	II	Ashes Lane			3 March 1976	TQ6215649549; 51°13′20″N 0°19′15″E		1248626	Upload Photo	Q26540824
North Frith Farm Oast	II	Ashes Lane			19 June 1986	TQ6114650512; 51°13′52″N 0°18′24″E		1070461	Upload Photo	Q26324364
North Frith Farmhouse	II	Ashes Lane			19 February 1990	TQ6122150495; 51°13′51″N 0°18′28″E		1363143	Upload Photo	Q26644984
North Frith House	II	Ashes Lane			17 May 1996	TQ6083050243; 51°13′43″N 0°18′07″E		1268478	Upload Photo	Q26558785
North Frith House, Gentlemens Bathing Box	II	Ashes Lane			17 May 1996	TQ6099650225; 51°13′43″N 0°18′16″E		1268479	Upload Photo	Q26558786
North Frith House, Ladies Bathing Box	II	Ashes Lane			17 May 1996	TQ6097550228; 51°13′43″N 0°18′15″E		1268480	Upload Photo	Q26558787
Old Chegs	II	Ashes Lane			19 February 1990	TQ6222149579; 51°13′20″N 0°19′18″E		1070459	Upload Photo	Q26324360
The Poult House	II	Ashes Lane			19 February 1990	TQ6117449650; 51°13′24″N 0°18′24″E		1363144	Upload Photo	Q26644985
The Rose Revived	II	Ashes Lane			19 February 1990	TQ6242949383; 51°13′14″N 0°19′28″E		1363142	Upload Photo	Q26644983
Bournside Farmhouse	II	Blackmans Lane			19 February 1990	TQ6318548952; 51°12′59″N 0°20′07″E		1236784	Upload Photo	Q26529984
Oasthouse Approximately 80 Metres North of Bournside Farmhouse	II	Blackmans Lane			19 February 1990	TQ6311448993; 51°13′01″N 0°20′03″E		1363145	Upload Photo	Q26644986
Bourne Mill Cottage	II	Carpenters Lane			23 September 1974	TQ6274850263; 51°13′42″N 0°19′46″E		1236788	Upload Photo	Q26529988
Costens Park End Cottages	II	Carpenters Lane			19 February 1990	TQ6292150947; 51°14′04″N 0°19′56″E		1363146	Upload Photo	Q26644987
Hoath Cottage	II	Carpenters Lane			19 February 1990	TQ6296550454; 51°13′48″N 0°19′58″E		1264431	Upload Photo	Q26555128
Hope Farmhouse	II	Carpenters Lane			20 October 1954	TQ6285750304; 51°13′43″N 0°19′52″E		1070463	Upload Photo	Q26324369
Spring Place	II*	Carpenters Lane			20 October 1954	TQ6279251063; 51°14′08″N 0°19′50″E		1236819	Upload Photo	Q17546978
The Close	II	Carpenters Lane			19 February 1990	TQ6327949749; 51°13′25″N 0°20′13″E		1070464	The Close More images	Q26324371
Bailiffs Cottage	II	Cemetery Lane			4 February 1992	TQ6419949881; 51°13′28″N 0°21′00″E		1248611	Upload Photo	Q26540810
1 Church Street	II	1, Church Street			20 October 1954	TQ6344249788; 51°13′26″N 0°20′21″E		1070465	1 Church Street More images	Q26324373
The Old Red House and 2 Church Street	II	Church Street			20 October 1954	TQ6342849786; 51°13′26″N 0°20′20″E		1237321	The Old Red House and 2 Church Street More images	Q26530472
Church of St Mary	II*	Church Street			20 October 1954	TQ6345449714; 51°13′24″N 0°20′22″E		1070466	Church of St Mary More images	Q7590167
Balcombe headstone approximately 10 metres south of the nave of the Church of St Mary	II	Church Street			19 February 1990	TQ6344649692; 51°13′23″N 0°20′21″E		1264340	Upload Photo	Q26555043
Barton headstone approximately 1 metre south of the nave of the Church of St Mary	II	Church Street			19 February 1990	TQ6345949700; 51°13′23″N 0°20′22″E		1070470	Upload Photo	Q26324391
Beeke headstone approximately 17 metres south of the nave of the Church of St Mary	II	Church Street			19 February 1990	TQ6344849686; 51°13′23″N 0°20′21″E		1070471	Upload Photo	Q26324393
Carnel chest tomb approximately 2 metres north of the organ loft of the Church of St Mary	II	Church Street			19 February 1990	TQ6346649723; 51°13′24″N 0°20′22″E		1264365	Carnel chest tomb approximately 2 metres north of the organ loft of the Church of St Mary More images	Q26555065
Carnell chest tomb approximately 3.5 metres north of the organ loft of the Church of St Mary	II	Church Street			19 February 1990	TQ6346649727; 51°13′24″N 0°20′22″E		1070468	Carnell chest tomb approximately 3.5 metres north of the organ loft of the Church of St Mary More images	Q26324387
Carrol headstone approximately 2.5 metres south of the chancel of the Church of St Mary	II	Church Street			19 February 1990	TQ6347049696; 51°13′23″N 0°20′22″E		1070472	Upload Photo	Q26324396
Golding chest tomb approximately 2 metres north of the vestry of the Church of St Mary	II	Church Street			19 February 1990	TQ6347149719; 51°13′24″N 0°20′23″E		1264370	Golding chest tomb approximately 2 metres north of the vestry of the Church of St Mary More images	Q26555070
Group of six Kipping headstones approximately 4 metres south of the nave of the Church of St Mary	II	Church Street			19 February 1990	TQ6344949700; 51°13′23″N 0°20′21″E		1070437	Upload Photo	Q26324320
Hodg headstone approximately 9 metres east of the chancel of the Church of St Mary	II	Church Street			19 February 1990	TQ6349349702; 51°13′23″N 0°20′24″E		1264279	Upload Photo	Q26554989
Hoppers Memorial approximately 20 metres east south east of the chancel of Church of St Mary	II	Church Street			19 February 1990	TQ6350049686; 51°13′23″N 0°20′24″E		1236918	Hoppers Memorial approximately 20 metres east south east of the chancel of Church of St Mary More images	Q26530112
Illegible chest tomb approximately 17 metres west south west of the tower of the Church of St Mary	II	Church Street			19 February 1990	TQ6342349708; 51°13′23″N 0°20′20″E		1363150	Upload Photo	Q26644991
Illegible headstone approximately 15 metres north west of the tower of the Church of St Mary	II	Church Street			19 February 1990	TQ6342449734; 51°13′24″N 0°20′20″E		1070442	Illegible headstone approximately 15 metres north west of the tower of the Church of St Mary More images	Q26324330
Iron railings to north of the churchyard of the Church of St Mary	II	Church Street			19 February 1990	TQ6345349735; 51°13′24″N 0°20′22″E		1264261	Iron railings to north of the churchyard of the Church of St Mary More images	Q26554975
Jeke headstone adjacent to south porch of the Church of St Mary	II	Church Street			19 February 1990	TQ6344449704; 51°13′23″N 0°20′21″E		1070475	Upload Photo	Q26324402
Lick headstone approximately 10 metres south of the nave of the Church of St Mary	II	Church Street			19 February 1990	TQ6345849686; 51°13′23″N 0°20′22″E		1363169	Upload Photo	Q26645008
Lomas headstone approximately 8 metres south of the tower of the Church of St Mary	II	Church Street			19 February 1990	TQ6342949698; 51°13′23″N 0°20′20″E		1070438	Upload Photo	Q26324322
Maltings Approximately 10 Metres South West of the Old Farmhouse, Style Place	II	Church Street			19 February 1990	TQ6460049003; 51°12′59″N 0°21′20″E		1237143	Upload Photo	Q26530313
May Family vault approximately 26 metres south west of the tower of the Church of St Mary	II	Church Street			19 February 1990	TQ6341249701; 51°13′23″N 0°20′19″E		1363148	Upload Photo	Q26644989
Pair of Barton headstones approximately 18 metres south west of the tower of the Church of St Mary	II	Church Street			19 February 1990	TQ6341449704; 51°13′23″N 0°20′20″E		1237035	Upload Photo	Q26530222
Pair of Cheesman headstones approximately 2.5 metres north of the organ loft of the Church of St Mary	II	Church Street			19 February 1990	TQ6346749722; 51°13′24″N 0°20′22″E		1070473	Upload Photo	Q26324398
Pair of Kibble chest tombs approximately 3 metres west of the tower of the Church of St Mary	II	Church Street			19 February 1990	TQ6342749718; 51°13′24″N 0°20′20″E		1363149	Pair of Kibble chest tombs approximately 3 metres west of the tower of the Church of St Mary More images	Q26644990
Pair of Wells headstones approximately 2 metres north east of the vestry of the Church of St Mary	II	Church Street			19 February 1990	TQ6347949716; 51°13′24″N 0°20′23″E		1363132	Upload Photo	Q26644974
Porter chest tomb approximately 20 metres south south west of the tower of the Church of St Mary	II	Church Street			19 February 1990	TQ6341749701; 51°13′23″N 0°20′20″E		1236945	Upload Photo	Q26530139
Rodger chest tomb approximately 2 metres west of the tower of the Church of St Mary	II	Church Street			19 February 1990	TQ6342849710; 51°13′23″N 0°20′20″E		1070469	Rodger chest tomb approximately 2 metres west of the tower of the Church of St Mary More images	Q26324389
Row of four James headstones approximately 3.5 metres south of the chancel of the Church of St Mary	II	Church Street			19 February 1990	TQ6346949691; 51°13′23″N 0°20′22″E		1264280	Upload Photo	Q26554990
Row of Hodsoll headstones approximately 400mm east of the chancel of the Church of St Mary	II	Church Street			19 February 1990	TQ6347549704; 51°13′23″N 0°20′23″E		1070474	Row of Hodsoll headstones approximately 400mm east of the chancel of the Church of St Mary More images	Q26324400
Saxby headstone approximately 3 metres south east of the chancel of the Church of St Mary	II	Church Street			19 February 1990	TQ6347749696; 51°13′23″N 0°20′23″E		1363170	Upload Photo	Q26645009
Simmons chest tomb approximately 2.5 metres south of the chancel of the Church of St Mary	II	Church Street			19 February 1990	TQ6346249698; 51°13′23″N 0°20′22″E		1264339	Simmons chest tomb approximately 2.5 metres south of the chancel of the Church of St Mary More images	Q26555042
Simmons headstone approximately 17 metres south of the nave of the Church of St Mary	II	Church Street			19 February 1990	TQ6344249687; 51°13′23″N 0°20′21″E		1070440	Upload Photo	Q26324326
Cheesman headstone approximately 7 metres east north east of the chancel of the Church of St Mary	II	Church Street			19 February 1990	TQ6348949711; 51°13′23″N 0°20′23″E		1237051	Upload Photo	Q26530234
Three Porter headstones approximately 19 metres west of the tower of the Church of St Mary	II	Church Street			19 February 1990	TQ6341449715; 51°13′24″N 0°20′20″E		1070439	Upload Photo	Q26324324
Wickersham headstone approximately 17 metres west of the tower of the Church of St Mary	II	Church Street			19 February 1990	TQ6342149721; 51°13′24″N 0°20′20″E		1070441	Upload Photo	Q26324328
Yardley Memorial approximately 2.5 metres west of the tower of the Church of St Mary	II	Church Street			19 February 1990	TQ6342849714; 51°13′24″N 0°20′20″E		1070467	Yardley Memorial approximately 2.5 metres west of the tower of the Church of St Mary More images	Q26324379
South wall to churchyard of the Church of St Mary	II	Church Street			19 February 1990	TQ6343149690; 51°13′23″N 0°20′20″E		1363133	South wall to churchyard of the Church of St Mary More images	Q26644975
Chancel House and Church House	II	Church Street			20 October 1954	TQ6341549757; 51°13′25″N 0°20′20″E		1236882	Chancel House and Church House More images	Q26530078
Church Place	II	Church Street			20 October 1954	TQ6343849764; 51°13′25″N 0°20′21″E		1363147	Church Place More images	Q26644988
Cobblestones	II	Church Street			20 October 1954	TQ6344649776; 51°13′26″N 0°20′21″E		1264412	Cobblestones More images	Q26555110
Goldhill House	II	Court Lane			19 February 1990	TQ6359548027; 51°12′29″N 0°20′26″E		1363135	Upload Photo	Q26644977
Stables Approximately 45 Metres West of the Old Farmhouse	II	Court Lane			19 February 1990	TQ6455049001; 51°12′59″N 0°21′17″E		1070445	Upload Photo	Q26324336
The Hermitage	II	Court Lane			20 October 1954	TQ6270449431; 51°13′15″N 0°19′43″E		1247971	Upload Photo	Q26540224
The Old Farmhouse	II*	Court Lane			20 October 1954	TQ6342848035; 51°12′29″N 0°20′18″E		1237176	Upload Photo	Q17546983
The Old Farmhouse, Style Place Farm (also known as Caxton Place)	II	Gardeners Cottage and The Gables			19 February 1990	TQ6460349040; 51°13′01″N 0°21′20″E		1237130	Upload Photo	Q26530300
Hartlake Barn	II	Hartlake Road			20 September 1976	TQ6321247499; 51°12′12″N 0°20′06″E		1363136	Upload Photo	Q26644978
Hartlake Cottage Hartlake Farmhouse	II	Hartlake Road			20 September 1976	TQ6325447488; 51°12′12″N 0°20′08″E		1264221	Upload Photo	Q26554943
Hartlake Oasthouse and Hartlake Roundels	II	Hartlake Road			19 February 1990	TQ6322147612; 51°12′16″N 0°20′06″E		1237184	Upload Photo	Q26530345
The Maltings I and II	II	Hartlake Road			25 July 1979	TQ6321749761; 51°13′25″N 0°20′10″E		1070448	Upload Photo	Q26324342
Thompsons Oast and Thompson Roundels	II	Hartlake Road			19 February 1990	TQ6337748048; 51°12′30″N 0°20′15″E		1070446	Upload Photo	Q26324338
Commercial House	II	High Street			20 October 1954	TQ6336549799; 51°13′26″N 0°20′17″E		1363137	Commercial House More images	Q26644979
Corneys	II	High Street			20 October 1954	TQ6344649814; 51°13′27″N 0°20′21″E		1070453	Corneys More images	Q26324350
Former Prince of Wales Public House	II	High Street			19 February 1990	TQ6320749688; 51°13′23″N 0°20′09″E		1363138	Upload Photo	Q26644980
Gateway to Hadlow Castle	II*	High Street			20 October 1954	TQ6335149741; 51°13′25″N 0°20′16″E		1363139	Gateway to Hadlow Castle More images	Q17547121
Grays House Hadlow Bakery	II	High Street			20 October 1954	TQ6332049725; 51°13′24″N 0°20′15″E		1070450	Grays House Hadlow Bakery More images	Q26324347
Hadlow Tower, Hadlow Castle	I	High Street			17 April 1951	TQ6341949639; 51°13′21″N 0°20′20″E		1070451	Hadlow Tower, Hadlow Castle More images	Q113452163
Lime Tree House	II	High Street			20 October 1954	TQ6338049803; 51°13′27″N 0°20′18″E		1237199	Lime Tree House More images	Q26530361
Little Corneys	II	High Street			20 October 1954	TQ6344549808; 51°13′27″N 0°20′21″E		1070454	Little Corneys More images	Q26324352
Natal House	II	High Street			20 October 1954	TQ6328349703; 51°13′23″N 0°20′13″E		1237241	Natal House More images	Q26530401
North Lodge	II*	High Street			20 October 1954	TQ6336049750; 51°13′25″N 0°20′17″E		1237277	North Lodge More images	Q17546994
Oasthouse Approximately 8 Metres North West of Spring House	II	High Street			19 February 1990	TQ6316049729; 51°13′24″N 0°20′07″E		1264209	Upload Photo	Q26554933
Ranges Round the Stable Yard West of Hadlow Tower, Hadlow Castle	II*	High Street			19 February 1990	TQ6343649674; 51°13′22″N 0°20′21″E		1237300	Upload Photo	Q17547000
South Lodge	II*	High Street			20 October 1954	TQ6334049733; 51°13′24″N 0°20′16″E		1237249	Upload Photo	Q17546988
Spring Cottage	II	High Street			19 February 1990	TQ6318349716; 51°13′24″N 0°20′08″E		1264196	Upload Photo	Q26554921
Spring House	II	High Street			19 February 1990	TQ6317549714; 51°13′24″N 0°20′07″E		1070449	Upload Photo	Q26324345
The High House	II	High Street			19 February 1990	TQ6499849341; 51°13′10″N 0°21′41″E		1070443	Upload Photo	Q26324332
The Pharmacy	II	High Street			20 October 1954	TQ6341449790; 51°13′26″N 0°20′20″E		1070452	Upload Photo	Q26324348
Walnut Tree Cottage	II	High Street			19 February 1990	TQ6341049841; 51°13′28″N 0°20′20″E		1070447	Upload Photo	Q26324340
The Terrace	II	5, Maidstone Road			19 February 1990	TQ6348549870; 51°13′29″N 0°20′24″E		1247881	Upload Photo	Q26540146
Appledale Cottage and wall to left	II	Maidstone Road			19 April 1985	TQ6413650999; 51°14′04″N 0°20′59″E		1070697	Upload Photo	Q26324948
Former barn 18 metres to the south-west of Goose Green Farmhouse	II	Maidstone Road			19 April 1985	TQ6460050962; 51°14′03″N 0°21′23″E		1363035	Upload Photo	Q26644887
Former oast house and granary 45 metres north-east of Goose Green Farmhouse	II	Maidstone Road			19 April 1985	TQ6468650995; 51°14′04″N 0°21′27″E		1070694	Upload Photo	Q26324938
Goose Green Farmhouse	II	Maidstone Road			1 August 1952	TQ6464150981; 51°14′03″N 0°21′25″E		1070695	Upload Photo	Q26324941
Hadlow Manor Hotel	II	Maidstone Road			19 April 1985	TQ6449150945; 51°14′02″N 0°21′17″E		1070698	Upload Photo	Q26324951
Hazel House	II	Maidstone Road			19 April 1985	TQ6435851060; 51°14′06″N 0°21′10″E		1070696	Upload Photo	Q26324945
James House Including Garden Walls Adjoining to Rear	II	Maidstone Road			20 October 1954	TQ6360050252; 51°13′41″N 0°20′30″E		1070455	Upload Photo	Q26324354
Paris Farmhouse	II	Maidstone Road			19 April 1985	TQ6411351010; 51°14′05″N 0°20′58″E		1363036	Upload Photo	Q26644888
North Lodge	II	Shipbourne Road			18 May 1987	TQ5982150733; 51°14′00″N 0°17′16″E		1247885	Upload Photo	Q26540150
The Thatch Cottage	II	Shipbourne Road			19 February 1990	TQ5976550423; 51°13′50″N 0°17′13″E		1070456	Upload Photo	Q26324357
Animal House and Stables Approximately 35 Metres West of the Old Farmhouse	II	Style Place, Court Lane			19 February 1990	TQ6455949022; 51°13′00″N 0°21′17″E		1264249	Upload Photo	Q26554969
Barn Approximately 35 Metres North West of the Old Farmhouse, Style Place	II	Style Place, Court Lane			19 February 1990	TQ6455549040; 51°13′01″N 0°21′17″E		1237154	Upload Photo	Q26530324
Outbuilding Approximately 40 Metres South West of the Old Farmhouse	II	Style Place, Court Lane			19 February 1990	TQ6460048985; 51°12′59″N 0°21′19″E		1070444	Upload Photo	Q26324334
Pump House Approximately 25 Metres South East of the Old Farmhouse	II	Style Place, Court Lane			19 February 1990	TQ6463549023; 51°13′00″N 0°21′21″E		1363134	Upload Photo	Q26644976
Barn Approximately 4 Metres South of Tithe Ward Farmhouse	II	Three Elm Lane			19 February 1990	TQ6339248359; 51°12′40″N 0°20′16″E		1363158	Upload Photo	Q26644998
Barnes Place	I	Three Elm Lane			20 October 1954	TQ6459248116; 51°12′31″N 0°21′18″E		1363161	Upload Photo	Q17530332
Barnes Street Farmhouse	II	Three Elm Lane			19 February 1990	TQ6470848111; 51°12′30″N 0°21′24″E		1070421	Upload Photo	Q26324287
Cartshed and Stables Approximately 15 Metres West of Goldhill Mill	II	Three Elm Lane			19 February 1990	TQ6360848458; 51°12′43″N 0°20′28″E		1363159	Upload Photo	Q26644999
Easterfield Farmhouse	II	Three Elm Lane			19 February 1990	TQ6334048453; 51°12′43″N 0°20′14″E		1363140	Upload Photo	Q26644981
Golden Green Mission Church	II	Three Elm Lane			19 February 1990	TQ6376448252; 51°12′36″N 0°20′35″E		1070418	Upload Photo	Q26324283
Goldhill Mill	II	Three Elm Lane			20 October 1954	TQ6363548457; 51°12′43″N 0°20′29″E		1070417	Upload Photo	Q26324281
Hadlow Place	II*	Three Elm Lane			20 October 1954	TQ6293748218; 51°12′36″N 0°19′53″E		1070457	Upload Photo	Q17546760
Hadlow Place Farmhouse	II	Three Elm Lane			19 February 1990	TQ6240148103; 51°12′33″N 0°19′25″E		1247903	Upload Photo	Q26540164
Poplar Court	II*	Three Elm Lane			20 October 1954	TQ6457348176; 51°12′33″N 0°21′17″E		1070420	Upload Photo	Q17546755
Poplar Farm Oast	II	Three Elm Lane			19 February 1990	TQ6453448205; 51°12′34″N 0°21′15″E		1070419	Upload Photo	Q26324285
The Barn	II	Three Elm Lane			19 February 1990	TQ6455048162; 51°12′32″N 0°21′16″E		1363160	Upload Photo	Q26645000
The Bell Public House	II	Three Elm Lane			29 January 1990	TQ6374148290; 51°12′37″N 0°20′34″E		1070422	Upload Photo	Q26324289
Tithe Ward Farmhouse	II	Three Elm Lane			19 February 1990	TQ6338948377; 51°12′40″N 0°20′16″E		1070416	Upload Photo	Q26324279
Faulkners Oast	II	Tonbridge Road			11 May 1973	TQ6222148908; 51°12′59″N 0°19′17″E		1263865	Upload Photo	Q26554621
Garden Walls Approximately 17 Metres South East of the Hermitage	II	Tonbridge Road			19 February 1990	TQ6275349410; 51°13′14″N 0°19′45″E		1363162	Upload Photo	Q26645001

== See also ==
- Grade I listed buildings in Tonbridge and Malling
- Grade II* listed buildings in Tonbridge and Malling

== Sources ==
- Newman, John (2012) [1969], Kent: West and the Weald, The Buildings of England, New Haven and London: Yale University Press, ISBN 978-0-300-18509-6
