= Listed buildings in Offham, Kent =

Civil Parish in Kent, England

Offham is a village and civil parish in the Tonbridge and Malling district of Kent, England. It contains 37 listed buildings that are recorded in the National Heritage List for England. Of these one is grade I, three are grade II* and 33 are grade II.

This list is based on the information retrieved online from Historic England.

== Key ==
Grade	Criteria
I	Buildings that are of exceptional interest
II*	Particularly important buildings of more than special interest
II	Buildings that are of special interest

== Listing ==
Name	Grade	Location	Type	Completed (Note: The date given is the date used by Historic England as significant for the initial building or that of an important part in the structure's description.)	Date designated	Grid ref. (Note: The grid reference is based on the British national grid reference system, sometimes known as OSGB36, used by the Ordnance Survey.) Geo-coordinates	Notes	Entry number (Note: The "List Entry Number" is a unique number assigned to each listed building and scheduled monument by Historic England.)	Image	Wikidata
Aldon Farmhouse	II	Aldon Lane			25 February 1987	TQ6476958001; 51°17′50″N 0°21′43″E		1070560	Upload Photo	Q26324554
The Oasthouse	II	Aldon Lane			25 February 1987	TQ6480858030; 51°17′51″N 0°21′45″E		1070559	Upload Photo	Q26324552
The Old Rectory	II	Aldon Lane			25 February 1987	TQ6479557937; 51°17′48″N 0°21′44″E		1070561	Upload Photo	Q26324558
Wall 30 Yards to the North of the Old Rectory	II	Aldon Lane			25 February 1987	TQ6478957976; 51°17′49″N 0°21′44″E		1070562	Upload Photo	Q26324561
Chest Tomb 10 Yards South West of Offham Church	II	Church Road			30 May 1984	TQ6601558055; 51°17′51″N 0°22′47″E		1236015	Upload Photo	Q26529286
Chest Tomb 10 Yards West of Offham Church	II	Church Road			30 May 1984	TQ6601258064; 51°17′51″N 0°22′47″E		1236020	Upload Photo	Q26529290
Chest Tomb 10 Yards West of Offham Church	II	Church Road			30 May 1984	TQ6601258066; 51°17′51″N 0°22′47″E		1236024	Upload Photo	Q26680479
Chest Tomb 10 Yards West of Offham Church	II	Church Road			30 May 1984	TQ6601258069; 51°17′51″N 0°22′47″E		1236025	Upload Photo	Q26890555
Chest Tomb 15 Yards South West of Offham Church	II	Church Road			30 May 1984	TQ6601558052; 51°17′51″N 0°22′47″E		1236014	Upload Photo	Q26529285
Church of St Michael	I	Church Road	church building		25 August 1959	TQ6602958063; 51°17′51″N 0°22′48″E		1264787	Church of St Michael More images	Q17530271
Frederick Addison Chest Tomb 15 Yards South of Offham Church	II	Church Road			30 May 1984	TQ6603158049; 51°17′50″N 0°22′48″E		1236011	Upload Photo	Q26529282
Hodges Place	II	Church Road			30 May 1984	TQ6598357335; 51°17′27″N 0°22′45″E		1264822	Upload Photo	Q26555479
Offham War Memorial in St Michaels Churchyard	II	Church Road	war memorial		17 March 2008	TQ6603758053; 51°17′51″N 0°22′49″E		1392475	Offham War Memorial in St Michaels Churchyard More images	Q26671692
Old Manor House	II*	Church Road, West Malling, ME19 5NX			1 August 1952	TQ6598158048; 51°17′51″N 0°22′46″E		1236003	Upload Photo	Q17546944
Comp Farmhouse	II	Comp Lane			13 February 1974	TQ6454857149; 51°17′23″N 0°21′30″E		1236026	Upload Photo	Q26529294
Little Comp Farmhouse	II	Comp Lane, Little Comp			30 May 1984	TQ6397156930; 51°17′16″N 0°21′00″E		1236030	Upload Photo	Q26529298
Quintain House and New Quintain	II*	North Meadow, West Malling, ME19 5NU	house		1 August 1952	TQ6571357317; 51°17′27″N 0°22′31″E		1264803	Quintain House and New Quintain More images	Q17547031
Walnut Tree Cottages	II	1 and 2, North Meadow			30 May 1984	TQ6583957494; 51°17′33″N 0°22′37″E		1264798	Upload Photo	Q26555456
Yew Tree Cottage	II	North Meadow			30 May 1984	TQ6575657343; 51°17′28″N 0°22′33″E		1236033	Upload Photo	Q26529301
Comp Corner Cottage	II	Seven Mile Lane			24 September 1986	TQ6394056921; 51°17′16″N 0°20′59″E		1236702	Upload Photo	Q26529912
The Boarded Cottage	II	146, Seven Mile Lane			30 May 1984	TQ6395356992; 51°17′18″N 0°20′59″E		1236039	Upload Photo	Q26529305
2, 3 and 4 Swan Cottages	II	2, 3 and 4, Swan Cottages, The Green, ME19 5NN			31 August 1973	TQ6568057254; 51°17′25″N 0°22′29″E		1236059	Upload Photo	Q26680487
King's Arms Public House	II	Teston Road	pub		30 May 1984	TQ6563957359; 51°17′29″N 0°22′27″E		1264799	King's Arms Public House More images	Q26555457
Morphews Oast	II	Teston Road			20 December 1973	TQ6598257244; 51°17′25″N 0°22′44″E		1236094	Upload Photo	Q26529355
Quintain	II	Teston Road	building		1 August 1952	TQ6572957276; 51°17′26″N 0°22′31″E		1264802	Quintain More images	Q17641448
Teston Cottage	II	Teston Road			1 August 1952	TQ6588657249; 51°17′25″N 0°22′39″E		1236088	Upload Photo	Q26529350
The Manor House	II*	Teston Road			1 August 1952	TQ6583257296; 51°17′26″N 0°22′37″E		1264775	Upload Photo	Q17547024
The Old Forge	II	Teston Road			31 August 1973	TQ6575957254; 51°17′25″N 0°22′33″E		1236068	Upload Photo	Q26529331
The Roundels	II	Teston Road			25 February 1987	TQ6503857579; 51°17′36″N 0°21′56″E		1070569	Upload Photo	Q26324579
Village Pound	II	Teston Road			30 May 1984	TQ6563357294; 51°17′26″N 0°22′27″E		1264801	Upload Photo	Q26555459
Wall Bordering Garden to North and East of Quintain House	II	Teston Road			30 May 1984	TQ6571757297; 51°17′27″N 0°22′31″E		1236046	Upload Photo	Q26529312
Wall to Garden of the Manor House	II	Teston Road			30 May 1984	TQ6579857283; 51°17′26″N 0°22′35″E		1236083	Upload Photo	Q26529345
K6 Telephone Kiosk	II	The Green			25 November 1987	TQ6578557284; 51°17′26″N 0°22′34″E		1236699	Upload Photo	Q26529909
Ramblers Cottage	II	The Green, ME19 5NN			30 May 1984	TQ6566957246; 51°17′25″N 0°22′28″E		1236058	Upload Photo	Q26529323
Kingscott	II	Tower Hill			30 May 1984	TQ6587357182; 51°17′23″N 0°22′39″E		1236107	Upload Photo	Q26529364
Offham House and Railings in Front of House	II	Tower Hill			1 August 1952	TQ6590957246; 51°17′25″N 0°22′41″E		1264753	Upload Photo	Q26555421
Postern House	II	Tower Hill			1 August 1952	TQ6591457259; 51°17′25″N 0°22′41″E		1264748	Upload Photo	Q26555417

== See also ==
- Grade I listed buildings in Kent
- Grade II* listed buildings in Kent

== Sources ==
- Newman, John (2012) [1969], Kent: West and the Weald, The Buildings of England, New Haven and London: Yale University Press, ISBN 978-0-300-18509-6
