= Listed buildings in Aylesford =

Civil Parish in Kent, England

Aylesford is village and a civil parish in the Tonbridge and Malling district of Kent, England. It contains 77 listed buildings that are recorded in the National Heritage List for England. Of these four are grade I, five are grade II* and 68 are grade II.

This list is based on the information retrieved online from Historic England..

== Key ==
Grade	Criteria
I	Buildings that are of exceptional interest
II*	Particularly important buildings of more than special interest
II	Buildings that are of special interest

== Listing ==
Name	Grade	Location	Type	Completed (Note: The date given is the date used by Historic England as significant for the initial building or that of an important part in the structure's description.)	Date designated	Grid ref. (Note: The grid reference is based on the British national grid reference system, sometimes known as OSGB36, used by the Ordnance Survey.) Geo-coordinates	Notes	Entry number (Note: The "List Entry Number" is a unique number assigned to each listed building and scheduled monument by Historic England.)	Image	Wikidata
Barn	II	Aylesford, Bull Lane, 50 Yards East of Court Lodge Farmhouse	Barn		25 February 1987	TQ7237759074; 51°18′17″N 0°28′17″E		1337004	Barn More images	Q26621460
Court Farmhouse	II*	Aylesford, Bull Lane	Farmhouse		1 August 1952	TQ7279159047; 51°18′16″N 0°28′39″E		1070571	Upload Photo	Q17546801
Court Lodge Farmhouse	II	Aylesford, Bull Lane	Farmhouse		25 February 1987	TQ7235859091; 51°18′17″N 0°28′17″E		1363082	Court Lodge Farmhouse More images	Q26644930
Eccles War Memorial Clock Tower	II	Aylesford, Bull Lane	War Memorial		30 August 2019	TQ7284060552; 51°19′04″N 0°28′44″E		1464868	Upload Photo	Q66894902
Gatehouse and Walls to the North and East of the Friars	I	Aylesford, Bull Lane	Gatehouse		25 February 1987	TQ7240358930; 51°18′12″N 0°28′19″E		1111775	Gatehouse and Walls to the North and East of the Friars More images	Q17530255
The Friars, Main Block	I	Aylesford, Bull Lane			25 August 1959	TQ7239658860; 51°18′10″N 0°28′18″E		1070570	The Friars, Main Block More images	Q17530220
Shrine of Our Lady of Mount Carmel and St Simon Stock	II*	Aylesford, Aylesford Priory			23 September 2016	TQ7243858895; 51°18′11″N 0°28′20″E		1437906	Shrine of Our Lady of Mount Carmel and St Simon Stock More images	Q66477910
Granary	II	Aylesford, Bull Lane, 10 Yards East of Court Farmhouse	Granary		25 February 1987	TQ7279159060; 51°18′16″N 0°28′39″E		1111780	Upload Photo	Q26405574
The Cedars and Wall to North	II	Aylesford, Bull Lane			1 August 1952	TQ7279858996; 51°18′14″N 0°28′39″E		1070572	Upload Photo	Q26324581
Church of St Peter and St Paul	I	Aylesford, Church Walk	Church		25 August 1959	TQ7293959032; 51°18′15″N 0°28′46″E	Ragstone church. West tower of rubble ragstone, Norman with top stage Perpendicular	1337029	Church of St Peter and St Paul More images	Q17530296
Brassey tomb monument approximately 36 metres north west of Church of St Peter and St Paul	II	Aylesford, Church Walk			25 February 1987	TQ7289959063; 51°18′16″N 0°28′44″E		1070537	Upload Photo	Q26324508
Chest tomb approximately 13 metres south east of Church of St Peter and St Paul	II	Aylesford, Church Walk			25 February 1987	TQ7296959022; 51°18′15″N 0°28′48″E		1070575	Chest tomb approximately 13 metres south east of Church of St Peter and St Paul More images	Q26324592
Chest tomb approximately 14 metres south of chancel of Church of St Peter and St Paul	II	Aylesford, Church Walk			25 February 1987	TQ7295759016; 51°18′14″N 0°28′47″E		1322400	Chest tomb approximately 14 metres south of chancel of Church of St Peter and St Paul More images	Q26608212
Chest tomb approximately 18 metres south east of Church of St Peter and St Paul	II	Aylesford, Church Walk			25 February 1987	TQ7296659016; 51°18′14″N 0°28′48″E		1363085	Chest tomb approximately 18 metres south east of Church of St Peter and St Paul More images	Q26644933
Chest tomb approximately 3 metres east of Church of St Peter and St Paul	II	Aylesford, Church Walk			25 February 1987	TQ7296059036; 51°18′15″N 0°28′47″E		1112546	Chest tomb approximately 3 metres east of Church of St Peter and St Paul More images	Q26406472
Chest tomb approximately 3 metres east of Church of St Peter and St Paul	II	Aylesford, Church Walk			25 February 1987	TQ7296059030; 51°18′15″N 0°28′47″E		1070576	Chest tomb approximately 3 metres east of Church of St Peter and St Paul More images	Q26324596
Chest tomb approximately 3 metres north east of Church of St Peter and St Paul	II	Aylesford, Church Walk			25 February 1987	TQ7295859042; 51°18′15″N 0°28′47″E		1363086	Chest tomb approximately 3 metres north east of Church of St Peter and St Paul More images	Q26644934
Chest tomb approximately 4 metres south of Church of St Peter and St Paul	II	Aylesford, Church Walk			25 February 1987	TQ7294759019; 51°18′14″N 0°28′47″E		1111754	Chest tomb approximately 4 metres south of Church of St Peter and St Paul More images	Q26405553
Chest tomb approximately 4 metres south of Church of St Peter and St Paul	II	Aylesford, Church Walk			25 February 1987	TQ7294359019; 51°18′14″N 0°28′47″E		1337031	Chest tomb approximately 4 metres south of Church of St Peter and St Paul More images	Q26685034
Chest tomb approximately 4 metres south of Church of St Peter and St Paul	II	Aylesford, Church Walk			25 February 1987	TQ7294059018; 51°18′14″N 0°28′46″E		1363083	Chest tomb approximately 4 metres south of Church of St Peter and St Paul More images	Q26894964
Chest tomb approximately 4 metres south of west tower of Church of St Peter and St Paul	II	Aylesford, Church Walk			25 February 1987	TQ7292359016; 51°18′14″N 0°28′46″E		1070574	Chest tomb approximately 4 metres south of west tower of Church of St Peter and St Paul More images	Q26324588
Chest tomb approximately 6 metres east of Church of St Peter and St Paul	II	Aylesford, Church Walk			25 February 1987	TQ7296659039; 51°18′15″N 0°28′48″E		1322403	Chest tomb approximately 6 metres east of Church of St Peter and St Paul More images	Q26608215
Chest tomb approximately 6 metres south of Church of St Peter and St Paul	II	Aylesford, Church Walk			25 February 1987	TQ7294559015; 51°18′14″N 0°28′47″E		1070573	Upload Photo	Q26324584
Chest tomb approximately 6 metres south of west tower of Church of St Peter and St Paul	II	Aylesford, Church Walk			25 February 1987	TQ7292259010; 51°18′14″N 0°28′45″E		1070538	Upload Photo	Q26324510
Chest tomb approximately 6 metres south of west tower of Church of St Peter and St Paul	II	Aylesford, Church Walk			25 February 1987	TQ7292459010; 51°18′14″N 0°28′46″E		1336968	Upload Photo	Q26685028
Spong tomb monument approximately 14 metres south of Church of St Peter and St Paul	II	Aylesford, Church Walk			25 February 1987	TQ7294159014; 51°18′14″N 0°28′46″E		1363084	Spong tomb monument approximately 14 metres south of Church of St Peter and St Paul More images	Q26644932
Table tomb approximately 3 metres east of Church of St Peter and St Paul	II	Aylesford, Church Walk			25 February 1987	TQ7296059028; 51°18′15″N 0°28′47″E		1322401	Table tomb approximately 3 metres east of Church of St Peter and St Paul More images	Q26608213
Fountain 30 Yards North of Preston Hall	II	Aylesford, Culpeper Road			19 January 1989	TQ7279958104; 51°17′45″N 0°28′38″E		1290321	Upload Photo	Q26578535
Preston Hall	II	Aylesford, Culpeper Road			19 January 1989	TQ7278658064; 51°17′44″N 0°28′37″E		1070492	Upload Photo	Q26324430
Statues Flanking Entrance 50 Yards South of Preston Hall	II	Aylesford, Culpeper Road			19 January 1989	TQ7277957992; 51°17′41″N 0°28′36″E		1363122	Upload Photo	Q26644966
Wall and Gates to Courtyard at Front of Preston Hall	II	Aylesford, Culpeper Road			19 January 1989	TQ7280358025; 51°17′42″N 0°28′38″E		1210705	Upload Photo	Q26505751
1, High Street	II	Aylesford, 1 High Street			25 February 1987	TQ7309058969; 51°18′13″N 0°28′54″E		1070540	1, High Street More images	Q26324514
11 and 13, High Street	II	Aylesford, 11 High Street			25 February 1987	TQ7304858965; 51°18′13″N 0°28′52″E		1070542	11 and 13, High Street More images	Q26324518
15, High Street	II	Aylesford, 15 High Street			25 February 1987	TQ7304158965; 51°18′13″N 0°28′52″E		1070543	15, High Street More images	Q26324520
Aylesford Village Shop	II	Aylesford, 21 High Street			25 February 1987	TQ7301758964; 51°18′13″N 0°28′50″E		1070544	Aylesford Village Shop More images	Q26324522
23 and 25, High Street	II	Aylesford, 23 and 25 High Street			25 February 1987	TQ7301058964; 51°18′13″N 0°28′50″E		1363108	23 and 25, High Street More images	Q26644954
24 and 26, High Street	II	Aylesford, 24 and 26 High Street			25 February 1987	TQ7300759000; 51°18′14″N 0°28′50″E		1111805	24 and 26, High Street More images	Q26405600
27, High Street	II	Aylesford, 27 High Street			25 February 1987	TQ7300158965; 51°18′13″N 0°28′49″E		1336990	27, High Street More images	Q26621447
41-55, High Street	II	Aylesford, 41-55 (odd) High Street			1 August 1952	TQ7294058975; 51°18′13″N 0°28′46″E		1111801	41-55, High Street More images	Q26405597
44-48, High Street	II	Aylesford, 44-48 (even) High Street			25 February 1987	TQ7296658988; 51°18′13″N 0°28′48″E		1070547	44-48, High Street More images	Q26324526
54-62, High Street	II	Aylesford, 54-62 (even) High Street			25 February 1987	TQ7294058989; 51°18′14″N 0°28′46″E		1336979	54-62, High Street More images	Q26621437
57 and 59, High Street	II	Aylesford, 57 and 59 High Street			1 August 1952	TQ7292058970; 51°18′13″N 0°28′45″E		1363109	57 and 59, High Street More images	Q26644955
67, High Street	II	Aylesford, 67 High Street			1 August 1952	TQ7289958978; 51°18′13″N 0°28′44″E		1363076	67, High Street More images	Q26644924
73, High Street	II	Aylesford, 73 High Street			1 August 1952	TQ7286658981; 51°18′13″N 0°28′43″E		1081537	73, High Street More images	Q26356994
75, High Street	II	Aylesford, 75 High Street			25 February 1987	TQ7287758984; 51°18′13″N 0°28′43″E		1070555	75, High Street More images	Q26324542
77, 79 and 81 High Street	II	Aylesford, 77, 79 and 81 High Street			25 February 1987	TQ7288458986; 51°18′13″N 0°28′43″E		1081539	77, 79 and 81 High Street More images	Q26356997
83, High Street	II	Aylesford, 83 High Street			25 February 1987	TQ7289458988; 51°18′14″N 0°28′44″E		1070546	83, High Street More images	Q26324524
Hengist Restaurant	II	Aylesford, High Street			25 February 1987	TQ7305858968; 51°18′13″N 0°28′52″E		1070541	Hengist Restaurant More images	Q26324516
The Chequers Public House	II*	Aylesford, High Street			1 August 1952	TQ7291258977; 51°18′13″N 0°28′45″E		1111803	The Chequers Public House More images	Q17546876
The George House	II*	Aylesford, High Street			1 August 1952	TQ7297358967; 51°18′13″N 0°28′48″E		1070545	The George House More images	Q17546796
The Little Gem Public House	II	Aylesford, High Street			25 August 1959	TQ7302558963; 51°18′13″N 0°28′51″E		1363107	The Little Gem Public House	Q26644953
Ivy Cottage	II	Aylesford, 290 London Road			10 April 1974	TQ7242657937; 51°17′40″N 0°28′18″E		1070539	Upload Photo	Q26324512
29 and 31 Mackenders Lane	II	Aylesford, 29 and 31 Mackenders Lane			2 May 1980	TQ7314260704; 51°19′09″N 0°29′00″E		1070548	Upload Photo	Q26324528
The Red Bull Public House	II	Aylesford, Mackenders Lane			25 February 1987	TQ7303660795; 51°19′12″N 0°28′54″E		1363110	Upload Photo	Q26644956
5, Mill Hall	II	Aylesford, 5 Mill Hall			25 February 1987	TQ7205858696; 51°18′05″N 0°28′00″E		1336981	Upload Photo	Q26621439
Aylesford Goods Shed	II	Aylesford, Mill Hall			8 February 2022	TQ7195958743; 51°18′07″N 0°27′55″E		1479200	Upload Photo	Q111853370
22-32, Mount Pleasant	II	Aylesford, 22-32 Mount Pleasant			25 February 1987	TQ7309359067; 51°18′16″N 0°28′54″E		1111809	Upload Photo	Q26405604
Arch and Wall to the North of Trinity Court	II	Aylesford, Mount Pleasant			25 February 1987	TQ7311759069; 51°18′16″N 0°28′56″E		1070549	Upload Photo	Q26324530
280, Pratling Street	II	Aylesford, 280 Pralling Street			25 February 1987	TQ7430759685; 51°18′35″N 0°29′58″E		1070550	Upload Photo	Q26324532
300, Pratling Street	II	Aylesford, 300 Pratling Street			25 February 1987	TQ7432259788; 51°18′38″N 0°29′59″E		1186853	Upload Photo	Q26482095
301 and 303, Pratling Street	II	Aylesford, 301 and 303 Pratling Street			25 February 1987	TQ7429359773; 51°18′37″N 0°29′58″E		1363111	Upload Photo	Q26644957
Ruins of Great Cossington at Cossington Farm	II	Aylesford, Pratling Street			25 February 1987	TQ7476659756; 51°18′36″N 0°30′22″E		1186850	Upload Photo	Q26482092
Former Methodist Church including Sunday School	II	Aylesford, 31 Rochester Road			2 April 1990	TQ7319559036; 51°18′15″N 0°29′00″E		1363141	Former Methodist Church including Sunday School	Q26644982
Anchor Farmhouse	II	Aylesford, Rochester Road			25 February 1987	TQ7356759530; 51°18′30″N 0°29′20″E		1186862	Upload Photo	Q26482104
Anchor Oast, Tottington Farm	II	Aylesford, Rochester Road			20 November 1995	TQ7355859577; 51°18′32″N 0°29′19″E		1242668	Upload Photo	Q26535431
Barn 150 Yards South of Little Tottington Farmhouse	II	Aylesford, Rochester Road			25 February 1987	TQ7396959974; 51°18′44″N 0°29′41″E		1186864	Upload Photo	Q26482106
Cowleaze Farmhouse	II	Aylesford, Rochester Road			25 February 1987	TQ7366759850; 51°18′41″N 0°29′25″E		1363112	Upload Photo	Q26644958
Hale Close	II	Aylesford, Rochester Road			25 February 1987	TQ7357760932; 51°19′16″N 0°29′23″E		1070552	Upload Photo	Q26324536
Little Culand Farmhouse	II	Aylesford, Rochester Road			25 February 1987	TQ7323161301; 51°19′28″N 0°29′05″E		1070553	Upload Photo	Q26324538
Old Mill House	II	Aylesford, Rochester Road			31 January 2005	TQ7336259363; 51°18′25″N 0°29′09″E		1391221	Upload Photo	Q26670590
Trinity Court	II*	Aylesford, Rochester Road			1 August 1952	TQ7312159048; 51°18′15″N 0°28′56″E		1298997	Upload Photo	Q17547065
Village Pump 10 Yards East of Trinity Court	II	Aylesford, Rochester Road			25 February 1987	TQ7313559046; 51°18′15″N 0°28′57″E		1070551	Upload Photo	Q26324534
460, Station Road	II	Aylesford, 460 Station Road			25 February 1987	TQ7284858791; 51°18′07″N 0°28′41″E		1070554	Upload Photo	Q26324540
Aylesford Bridge	I	Aylesford, Station Road			25 August 1959	TQ7294158927; 51°18′11″N 0°28′46″E		1363113	Aylesford Bridge More images	Q17530328
Aylesford railway station	II	Aylesford, Station Road			25 February 1987	TQ7201158690; 51°18′05″N 0°27′58″E		1186882	Aylesford railway station More images	Q26482124
Aylesford Signal Box	II	Aylesford, Aylesford Station	Railway station		12 July 2013	TQ7205658680; 51°18′04″N 0°28′00″E		1415110	Upload Photo	Q26676432
Former Village School and Rosalind's Cottage	II	Aylesford, Station Road			25 February 1987	TQ7289758816; 51°18′08″N 0°28′44″E		1186870	Upload Photo	Q26482111

== See also ==
- Grade I listed buildings in Kent
- Grade II* listed buildings in Kent

== Sources ==
- Newman, John (2012) [1969], Kent: West and the Weald, The Buildings of England, New Haven and London: Yale University Press, ISBN 978-0-300-18509-6
