= Listed buildings in Ightham =

Historic structures in Kent, England

Ightham is a village and civil parish in the Tonbridge and Malling district of Kent, England. It contains two grade I, four grade II* and 55 grade II listed buildings that are recorded in the National Heritage List for England.

This list is based on the information retrieved online from Historic England.

== Key ==
Grade	Criteria
I	Buildings that are of exceptional interest
II*	Particularly important buildings of more than special interest
II	Buildings that are of special interest

== Listing ==
Name	Grade	Location	Type	Completed (Note: The date given is the date used by Historic England as significant for the initial building or that of an important part in the structure's description.)	Date designated	Grid ref. (Note: The grid reference is based on the British national grid reference system, sometimes known as OSGB36, used by the Ordnance Survey.) Geo-coordinates	Notes	Entry number (Note: The "List Entry Number" is a unique number assigned to each listed building and scheduled monument by Historic England.)	Image	Wikidata
Cricketts Farmhouse	II	Borough Green Road			3 May 1984	TQ6011857629; 51°17′43″N 0°17′43″E		1362406	Upload Photo	Q26644298
Methodist Chapel	II	Chapel Row			4 December 1996	TQ5923756676; 51°17′13″N 0°16′56″E		1259583	Upload Photo	Q26550682
Forge Cottage	II	Coach Road			3 May 1984	TQ5872454350; 51°15′58″N 0°16′25″E		1071959	Upload Photo	Q26327337
Ivors	II	Coach Road			3 May 1984	TQ5871854364; 51°15′59″N 0°16′25″E		1362407	Upload Photo	Q26644299
Raspit Hill	II	Coach Road			3 May 1984	TQ5818454791; 51°16′13″N 0°15′58″E		1071960	Upload Photo	Q26327338
Harrow Cottage	II	Common Road			3 May 1984	TQ5874255683; 51°16′41″N 0°16′28″E		1362408	Upload Photo	Q26644300
The Old Cottage the Workhouse	II	Common Road			3 May 1984	TQ5873755723; 51°16′43″N 0°16′28″E		1071961	Upload Photo	Q26327340
Church of St Peter	I	Fen Pond Road			25 August 1959	TQ5948456930; 51°17′21″N 0°17′09″E		1071962	Church of St Peter More images	Q17530242
Bailey Tomb, 10 Yards North East of Church of St Peter	II	Fen Pond Road			3 May 1984	TQ5949456942; 51°17′21″N 0°17′09″E		1362409	Bailey Tomb, 10 Yards North East of Church of St Peter More images	Q26644301
Barn 60 Yards to East of Boundary Oast	II	Fen Pond Road			3 May 1984	TQ5940257863; 51°17′51″N 0°17′06″E		1071969	Upload Photo	Q26327348
Chest Tomb 10 Yards East of Church of St Peter	II	Fen Pond Road			3 May 1984	TQ5950256935; 51°17′21″N 0°17′10″E		1071963	Upload Photo	Q26327341
Chest Tomb 10 Yards North West of Church of St Peter	II	Fen Pond Road			3 May 1984	TQ5949956924; 51°17′21″N 0°17′10″E		1071964	Chest Tomb 10 Yards North West of Church of St Peter More images	Q26327343
Chest Tomb 15 Yards North West of Church of St Peter	II	Fen Pond Road			3 May 1984	TQ5950156917; 51°17′21″N 0°17′10″E		1071965	Chest Tomb 15 Yards North West of Church of St Peter More images	Q26327344
Chest Tomb 10 Yards South of South Porch	II	Fen Pond Road			3 May 1984	TQ5948256911; 51°17′20″N 0°17′09″E		1071966	Chest Tomb 10 Yards South of South Porch More images	Q26327346
Table Tomb in Churchyard of Church of St Peter 15 Yards South of South Porch	II	Fen Pond Road			3 May 1984	TQ5948156907; 51°17′20″N 0°17′09″E		1071967	Table Tomb in Churchyard of Church of St Peter 15 Yards South of South Porch More images	Q26327347
Chest Tomb 5 Yards South of Church of St Peter	II	Fen Pond Road			3 May 1984	TQ5949056920; 51°17′21″N 0°17′09″E		1281454	Chest Tomb 5 Yards South of Church of St Peter More images	Q26570505
Chest Tomb 20 Yards North West of Church of St Peter	II	Fen Pond Road			3 May 1984	TQ5950656916; 51°17′21″N 0°17′10″E		1281489	Chest Tomb 20 Yards North West of Church of St Peter More images	Q26570536
Boundary House	II	Fen Pond Road			3 May 1984	TQ5939057822; 51°17′50″N 0°17′05″E		1281462	Upload Photo	Q26570512
Church Cottage	II	Fen Pond Road			3 May 1984	TQ5952556949; 51°17′22″N 0°17′11″E		1203907	Church Cottage More images	Q26499406
Ightham Court	II*	Fen Pond Road			1 August 1952	TQ5950657559; 51°17′41″N 0°17′11″E		1071968	Upload Photo	Q17546819
Fir Tree House	II	Ismays Road			3 May 1984	TQ5877254416; 51°16′00″N 0°16′28″E		1203936	Upload Photo	Q26499436
K6 Telephone Kiosk, Ismays Road	II	Ismays Road			7 June 1989	TQ5873254392; 51°16′00″N 0°16′26″E		1261797	Upload Photo	Q26552722
Ightham Mote	I	Mote Road			1 August 1952	TQ5847653485; 51°15′31″N 0°16′11″E		1362410	Ightham Mote More images	Q1254903
Garden Urn 30 Yards West of Ightham Mote	II	Mote Road			3 May 1984	TQ5840853467; 51°15′30″N 0°16′08″E		1071971	Garden Urn 30 Yards West of Ightham Mote More images	Q26327351
Gates, Gatepiers and Mounting Block to South West of Ightham Mote	II	Mote Road			3 May 1984	TQ5844053457; 51°15′30″N 0°16′09″E		1281424	Gates, Gatepiers and Mounting Block to South West of Ightham Mote More images	Q26570476
Mote Farm Cottages Old Laundry Cottage	II*	1-4, Mote Road			1 August 1952	TQ5838753459; 51°15′30″N 0°16′07″E		1362411	Mote Farm Cottages Old Laundry Cottage More images	Q17547096
Mote Farmhouse	II	Mote Road			1 August 1952	TQ5843653326; 51°15′26″N 0°16′09″E		1071970	Upload Photo	Q26327350
East Mote Oast	II	Mote Road			3 May 1984	TQ5869753702; 51°15′37″N 0°16′23″E		1281428	Upload Photo	Q26570481
Oasthouse 75 Yards North of Mote Farmhouse	II	Mote Road			3 May 1984	TQ5836853306; 51°15′25″N 0°16′05″E		1203955	Upload Photo	Q26499453
Stable Building 20 Yards to East of Ightham Mote	II	Mote Road			3 May 1984	TQ5850653481; 51°15′30″N 0°16′13″E		1281418	Upload Photo	Q26570470
The Old House	II	Mote Road			1 August 1952	TQ5870154291; 51°15′56″N 0°16′24″E		1071972	Upload Photo	Q26327353
Oldbury Hall	II	Oldbury Lane			1 August 1952	TQ5875856505; 51°17′08″N 0°16′31″E		1071973	Upload Photo	Q26327354
Oldbury Manor Farmhouse	II	Oldbury Lane			3 May 1984	TQ5854156629; 51°17′12″N 0°16′20″E		1281394	Upload Photo	Q26570446
Prestons Farmhouse	II	Rectory Lane			3 May 1984	TQ5940356269; 51°17′00″N 0°17′04″E		1362412	Upload Photo	Q26644302
The Well Springs	II	Rectory Lane			3 May 1984	TQ5931156278; 51°17′00″N 0°16′59″E		1362383	Upload Photo	Q26644277
Holly Tree Cottage	II	Redwell Lane			3 May 1984	TQ5899655871; 51°16′47″N 0°16′42″E		1071975	Upload Photo	Q26327357
Langleys	II	Redwell Lane			3 May 1984	TQ5884655745; 51°16′43″N 0°16′34″E		1071974	Upload Photo	Q26327356
Redwell	II	Redwell Lane			3 May 1984	TQ5913555833; 51°16′46″N 0°16′49″E		1071976	Upload Photo	Q26327358
The Old House Public House	II	Redwell Lane			25 August 1959	TQ5902155886; 51°16′48″N 0°16′43″E		1362374	Upload Photo	Q18161020
Yew Tree Cottage	II	Redwell Lane			3 May 1984	TQ5895755820; 51°16′46″N 0°16′40″E		1362413	Upload Photo	Q26644303
The Old Forge	II	School Road			1 August 1952	TQ5936656598; 51°17′10″N 0°17′02″E		1071977	Upload Photo	Q26327360
The Bank	II	1, 3 and 4, The Street			25 August 1959	TQ5953256663; 51°17′12″N 0°17′11″E		1281330	The Bank More images	Q26570387
Bank Cottage	II	The Street			3 May 1984	TQ5952356653; 51°17′12″N 0°17′10″E		1362379	Bank Cottage More images	Q26644273
The George and Dragon Public House	II	The Street			1 August 1952	TQ5953456716; 51°17′14″N 0°17′11″E		1204161	The George and Dragon Public House More images	Q26499637
Bank Cottages	II	The Street			1 August 1952	TQ5954556678; 51°17′13″N 0°17′11″E		1071982	Bank Cottages More images	Q26327366
Bank House	II	The Street			3 May 1984	TQ5958156688; 51°17′13″N 0°17′13″E		1204220	Bank House More images	Q26499690
Chequers	II	The Street			3 May 1984	TQ5949656649; 51°17′12″N 0°17′09″E		1071978	Chequers More images	Q26327362
Hortondene the Gallery	II	The Street			3 May 1984	TQ5952656686; 51°17′13″N 0°17′11″E		1071980	Hortondene the Gallery More images	Q26327365
Ightham Place	II*	The Street			3 May 1984	TQ5957756747; 51°17′15″N 0°17′13″E		1071981	Ightham Place More images	Q17546824
Old Forge House	II*	The Street			1 August 1952	TQ5955256739; 51°17′15″N 0°17′12″E		1204195	Old Forge House More images	Q17546898
Old Stones	II	The Street			1 August 1952	TQ5945856619; 51°17′11″N 0°17′07″E		1362375	Old Stones More images	Q26644269
Petts Cottage	II	The Street			3 May 1984	TQ5950556658; 51°17′12″N 0°17′09″E		1362376	Petts Cottage More images	Q26644270
Stone Cottage	II	The Street			3 May 1984	TQ5951056664; 51°17′12″N 0°17′10″E		1281408	Stone Cottage More images	Q26570461
Stone House	II	The Street			3 May 1984	TQ5951756671; 51°17′13″N 0°17′10″E		1071979	Stone House More images	Q26327364
Sycamore Cottage	II	The Street			3 May 1984	TQ5957656708; 51°17′14″N 0°17′13″E		1362378	Upload Photo	Q26644272
The Town House	II	The Street			1 August 1952	TQ5953156748; 51°17′15″N 0°17′11″E		1362377	The Town House More images	Q26644271
Tudor Cottage	II	The Street			3 May 1984	TQ5956956713; 51°17′14″N 0°17′13″E		1204212	Tudor Cottage More images	Q26499682
Bewley Farm	II	Tonbridge Road			3 May 1984	TQ5945255054; 51°16′20″N 0°17′04″E		1071983	Upload Photo	Q26327369
Gibbon's Place	II	Tonbridge Road			1 August 1952	TQ5954255429; 51°16′32″N 0°17′09″E		1204235	Upload Photo	Q26499705
Meadlands	II	Tonbridge Road			3 May 1984	TQ5941156107; 51°16′54″N 0°17′04″E		1261762	Upload Photo	Q26552690
The Bower House	II	Tonbridge Road			3 May 1984	TQ5940156298; 51°17′01″N 0°17′03″E		1071984	Upload Photo	Q26327370

== See also ==
- Grade I listed buildings in Kent
- Grade II* listed buildings in Kent

== Sources ==
- Newman, John (2012) [1969], Kent: West and the Weald, The Buildings of England, New Haven and London: Yale University Press, ISBN 978-0-300-18509-6
