= Listed buildings in Ryarsh =

Civil Parish in Kent, England

Ryarsh is a village and civil parish in the Tonbridge and Malling district of Kent, England. It contains twelve listed buildings that are recorded in the National Heritage List for England. Of these one is grade II* and eleven are grade II.

This list is based on the information retrieved online from Historic England.

== Key ==
Grade	Criteria
I	Buildings that are of exceptional interest
II*	Particularly important buildings of more than special interest
II	Buildings that are of special interest

== Listing ==
Name	Grade	Location	Type	Completed (Note: The date given is the date used by Historic England as significant for the initial building or that of an important part in the structure's description.)	Date designated	Grid ref. (Note: The grid reference is based on the British national grid reference system, sometimes known as OSGB36, used by the Ordnance Survey.) Geo-coordinates	Notes	Entry number (Note: The "List Entry Number" is a unique number assigned to each listed building and scheduled monument by Historic England.)	Image	Wikidata
90-92, Chapel Road	II	90-92, Chapel Road			25 February 1987	TQ6686760237; 51°19′00″N 0°23′35″E		1070476	Upload Photo	Q26324404
Dingle Dell Cottage	II	89, Chapel Road			25 February 1987	TQ6689560183; 51°18′59″N 0°23′36″E		1070514	Upload Photo	Q26324467
Church Farmhouse	II	Church Road			25 February 1987	TQ6723459045; 51°18′21″N 0°23′52″E		1070478	Upload Photo	Q26324406
Church of St Martin	II*	Church Road	church building		25 August 1959	TQ6723459136; 51°18′24″N 0°23′52″E		1070477	Church of St Martin More images	Q17546771
Calais Court	II	London Road			1 August 1952	TQ6730958535; 51°18′05″N 0°23′55″E		1363114	Upload Photo	Q26644959
Milestone	II	London Road			25 February 1987	TQ6687058643; 51°18′09″N 0°23′33″E		1363151	Upload Photo	Q26644992
Ryarsh Place	II	Woodgate Lane			1 August 1952	TQ6707859897; 51°18′49″N 0°23′45″E		1070482	Upload Photo	Q26324413
The Duke of Wellington Public House	II	Woodgate Lane			25 February 1987	TQ6700559903; 51°18′49″N 0°23′42″E		1363115	Upload Photo	Q26644960
The Holmes	II	Woodgate Lane			25 February 1987	TQ6696659890; 51°18′49″N 0°23′40″E		1070481	Upload Photo	Q26324412
Elm Tree House	II	Woodgate Lane Road			25 February 1987	TQ6696459846; 51°18′48″N 0°23′39″E		1070480	Upload Photo	Q26324410
Godfreys	II	Woodgate Road			25 February 1987	TQ6728360103; 51°18′56″N 0°23′56″E		1101542	Upload Photo	Q26395081
Lilac Cottage	II	Woodgate Road			25 February 1987	TQ6751660157; 51°18′57″N 0°24′08″E		1363116	Upload Photo	Q26644961

== See also ==
- Grade I listed buildings in Kent
- Grade II* listed buildings in Kent

== Sources ==
- Newman, John (2012) [1969], Kent: West and the Weald, The Buildings of England, New Haven and London: Yale University Press, ISBN 978-0-300-18509-6
