= Listed buildings in Stansted, Kent =

Civil Parish in Kent, England

Stansted is a village and civil parish in the Tonbridge and Malling district of Kent, England. It contains eleven listed buildings that are recorded in the National Heritage List for England. Of these three are grade II* and 8 are grade II.

This list is based on the information retrieved online from Historic England.

== Key ==
Grade	Criteria
I	Buildings that are of exceptional interest
II*	Particularly important buildings of more than special interest
II	Buildings that are of special interest

== Listing ==
Name	Grade	Location	Type	Completed (Note: The date given is the date used by Historic England as significant for the initial building or that of an important part in the structure's description.)	Date designated	Grid ref. (Note: The grid reference is based on the British national grid reference system, sometimes known as OSGB36, used by the Ordnance Survey.) Geo-coordinates	Notes	Entry number (Note: The "List Entry Number" is a unique number assigned to each listed building and scheduled monument by Historic England.)	Image	Wikidata
Court Lodge	II	Plaxdale Green Road			30 May 1984	TQ6082162152; 51°20′09″N 0°18′26″E		1236115	Upload Photo	Q26529372
Old Manor Cottage	II	Plaxdale Green Road			30 May 1984	TQ6003361925; 51°20′02″N 0°17′45″E		1236118	Upload Photo	Q26529375
The Old Rectory	II	Plaxdale Green Road			30 May 1984	TQ6050862226; 51°20′11″N 0°18′10″E		1236111	Upload Photo	Q26529368
Rumney Farmhouse	II	South Ash Road			30 May 1984	TQ6013163603; 51°20′56″N 0°17′53″E		1236151	Upload Photo	Q26529405
Church of St Mary	II*	Stansted Hill	church building		25 August 1959	TQ6073662124; 51°20′08″N 0°18′22″E		1236153	Church of St Mary More images	Q17546954
War Memorial	II	Stansted Hill	war memorial		30 May 1984	TQ6083362228; 51°20′11″N 0°18′27″E		1236154	War Memorial More images	Q26529407
Church Cottage	II	Tumblefield Road			30 May 1984	TQ6067362126; 51°20′08″N 0°18′18″E		1236156	Upload Photo	Q26529409
Fairseat House	II	Vigo Road			30 May 1984	TQ6214061587; 51°19′49″N 0°19′33″E		1236183	Upload Photo	Q26529434
Fairseat Manor and Garden Wall to North	II*	Vigo Road			1 August 1952	TQ6220261440; 51°19′44″N 0°19′36″E		1236169	Upload Photo	Q17546959
Coldharbour Farmhouse	II	Wrotham Hill Road			30 May 1984	TQ6104461160; 51°19′36″N 0°18′36″E		1236190	Upload Photo	Q26529441

== See also ==
- Grade I listed buildings in Kent
- Grade II* listed buildings in Kent

== Sources ==
- Newman, John (2012) [1969], Kent: West and the Weald, The Buildings of England, New Haven and London: Yale University Press, ISBN 978-0-300-18509-6
