= Listed buildings in Snodland =

Civil Parish in Kent, England

Snodland is a village and civil parish in the Tonbridge and Malling district of Kent, England. It contains 27 listed buildings that are recorded in the National Heritage List for England. Of these one is grade I, four are grade II* and 22 are grade II.

This list is based on the information retrieved online from Historic England.

== Key ==
Grade	Criteria
I	Buildings that are of exceptional interest
II*	Particularly important buildings of more than special interest
II	Buildings that are of special interest

== Listing ==
Name	Grade	Location	Type	Completed (Note: The date given is the date used by Historic England as significant for the initial building or that of an important part in the structure's description.)	Date designated	Grid ref. (Note: The grid reference is based on the British national grid reference system, sometimes known as OSGB36, used by the Ordnance Survey.) Geo-coordinates	Notes	Entry number (Note: The "List Entry Number" is a unique number assigned to each listed building and scheduled monument by Historic England.)	Image	Wikidata
Snodland Signal Box	II	ME6 5AN			25 April 2013	TQ7067461795; 51°19′47″N 0°26′54″E		1413577	Upload Photo	Q26676350
Dode Church (church of Our Lady of the Meadow)	II*	Wrangling Lane, Luddesdowne, Gravesend, DA13 0XF, Dode	church building		25 August 1959	TQ6685563725; 51°20′53″N 0°23′40″E		1101756	Dode Church (church of Our Lady of the Meadow) More images	Q17546869
1, Alex Hughes Close	II	1, Alex Hughes Close, ME6 5ST			25 February 1987	TQ6976260590; 51°19′09″N 0°26′05″E		1070520	Upload Photo	Q26324477
Chest Tomb 5 Yards South of All Saints Church	II	All Saints Church, Mill Street, ME6 5AT			25 February 1987	TQ7076361808; 51°19′47″N 0°26′59″E		1070483	Upload Photo	Q26324415
13 and 15, Brook Lane	II	13 and 15, Brook Lane, ME6 5JS			25 February 1987	TQ6995760624; 51°19′10″N 0°26′15″E		1070557	Upload Photo	Q26324547
9 and 11, Brook Lane	II	9 and 11, Brook Lane, ME6 5JS			25 February 1987	TQ6994260621; 51°19′10″N 0°26′14″E		1081508	Upload Photo	Q26356952
Ham Mill Cottage	II	56, Brook Lane, ME6 5JY			25 February 1987	TQ7013060640; 51°19′10″N 0°26′24″E		1070558	Upload Photo	Q26324549
Woodlands Farmhouse	II*	Constitution Hill, ME6 5DJ	farmhouse		16 January 1981	TQ6980761991; 51°19′54″N 0°26′10″E		1101517	Woodlands Farmhouse More images	Q17546865
1, High Street	II	1, High Street, ME6 5DG			25 August 1970	TQ7018761886; 51°19′50″N 0°26′29″E		1101495	Upload Photo	Q26394978
Mulberry Cottage	II*	73, High Street, ME6 5AL	cottage		1 August 1952	TQ7051961811; 51°19′47″N 0°26′46″E		1070485	Mulberry Cottage More images	Q17546777
Snodland Station	II	High Street, ME6 5AN	railway station		15 March 1989	TQ7066361864; 51°19′49″N 0°26′54″E		1070493	Snodland Station More images	Q1899707
The Church House	II	70, High Street, ME6 5AG	church building		25 February 1987	TQ7044861784; 51°19′47″N 0°26′43″E		1101527	The Church House More images	Q26395040
72, Holborough Road	II	72, Holborough Road, ME6 5PB			25 February 1987	TQ7035062102; 51°19′57″N 0°26′38″E		1363118	Upload Photo	Q26644963
74, Holborough Road	II	74, Holborough Road, ME6 5PB			25 February 1987	TQ7034662107; 51°19′57″N 0°26′38″E		1101501	Upload Photo	Q26394992
Island Cottage	II	Holborough Road, ME6 5PJ			1 August 1952	TQ7038362725; 51°20′17″N 0°26′41″E		1347919	Upload Photo	Q26631338
Little Holborough	II	Holborough Road, ME6 5PJ			1 August 1952	TQ7041962730; 51°20′17″N 0°26′43″E		1070486	Upload Photo	Q26324420
The Cedars	II	Holborough Road, ME6 5PL			25 February 1987	TQ7036163064; 51°20′28″N 0°26′40″E		1363119	Upload Photo	Q26644964
Church of All Saints	I	Mill Street, ME6 5AT	church building		25 August 1959	TQ7076161822; 51°19′47″N 0°26′59″E		1347897	Church of All Saints More images	Q17530310
Barn 30 Yards to the West of Paddlesworth Old Farmhouse	II	Paddlesworth Road, ME6 5PJ			1 August 1952	TQ6843962175; 51°20′01″N 0°25′00″E		1070488	Upload Photo	Q26324424
Barn with Attached Well House 30 Yards East of Paddlesworth Old Farmhouse	II	Paddlesworth Road, ME6 5DR			1 August 1953	TQ6851662177; 51°20′01″N 0°25′04″E		1347909	Upload Photo	Q26631330
Church of St Benedict	II*	Paddlesworth Road, ME6 5DR	church building		25 August 1959	TQ6847462116; 51°19′59″N 0°25′01″E		1363120	Church of St Benedict More images	Q7592638
Mark Farmhouse	II	Paddlesworth Road, ME6 5DP			25 February 1987	TQ6910862124; 51°19′59″N 0°25′34″E		1101484	Upload Photo	Q26394954
Paddlesworth Old Farmhouse	II	Paddlesworth Road, ME6 5DR			1 August 1952	TQ6848962179; 51°20′01″N 0°25′02″E		1070487	Upload Photo	Q26324422
Store 25 Yards South West of Paddlesworth Old Farmhouse	II	Paddlesworth Road, ME6 5DR			1 August 1952	TQ6847562162; 51°20′01″N 0°25′01″E		1101463	Upload Photo	Q26394915
Grotto 15 Yards South of South East Water Offices	II	Rocfort Road, ME6 5NQ			25 February 1987	TQ7043461693; 51°19′44″N 0°26′42″E		1070484	Upload Photo	Q26324418
Snodland War Memorial	II	Snodland Cemetery, ME6 5DN			11 March 2019	TQ6969562237; 51°20′02″N 0°26′04″E		1463032	Upload Photo	Q66480111
Gates and Walls to the Church House	II	The Church House, 70, High Street, ME6 5AG			25 February 1987	TQ7044961800; 51°19′47″N 0°26′43″E		1363117	Upload Photo	Q26644962

== See also ==
- Grade I listed buildings in Kent
- Grade II* listed buildings in Kent

== Sources ==
- Newman, John (2012) [1969], Kent: West and the Weald, The Buildings of England, New Haven and London: Yale University Press, ISBN 978-0-300-18509-6
