= Stansted, Kent =

Village in Kent, England

Coordinates: 51.335860°N 0.305350°E

Stansted
- Location within Kent
- Population: 484 (2011 Census)
- District: Tonbridge and Malling
- Shire county: Kent
- Region: South East
- Country: England
- Sovereign state: United Kingdom
- Post town: Sevenoaks
- Postcode district: TN15
- Police: Kent
- Fire: Kent
- Ambulance: South East Coast
- UK Parliament: Tonbridge
- Website: Stansted Parish Council

Stansted (referred to in older texts as Stanstead) is a village and rural parish in the Tonbridge and Malling district of the county of Kent in the United Kingdom (not to be confused with Stansted Mountfitchet or London Stansted Airport, both of which are in Essex).

It is located close to the M20 motorway. The Morris dancers of Stansted were one of the earliest groups to form from the revival of the activity, in 1934. The name Stansted means "stony place".

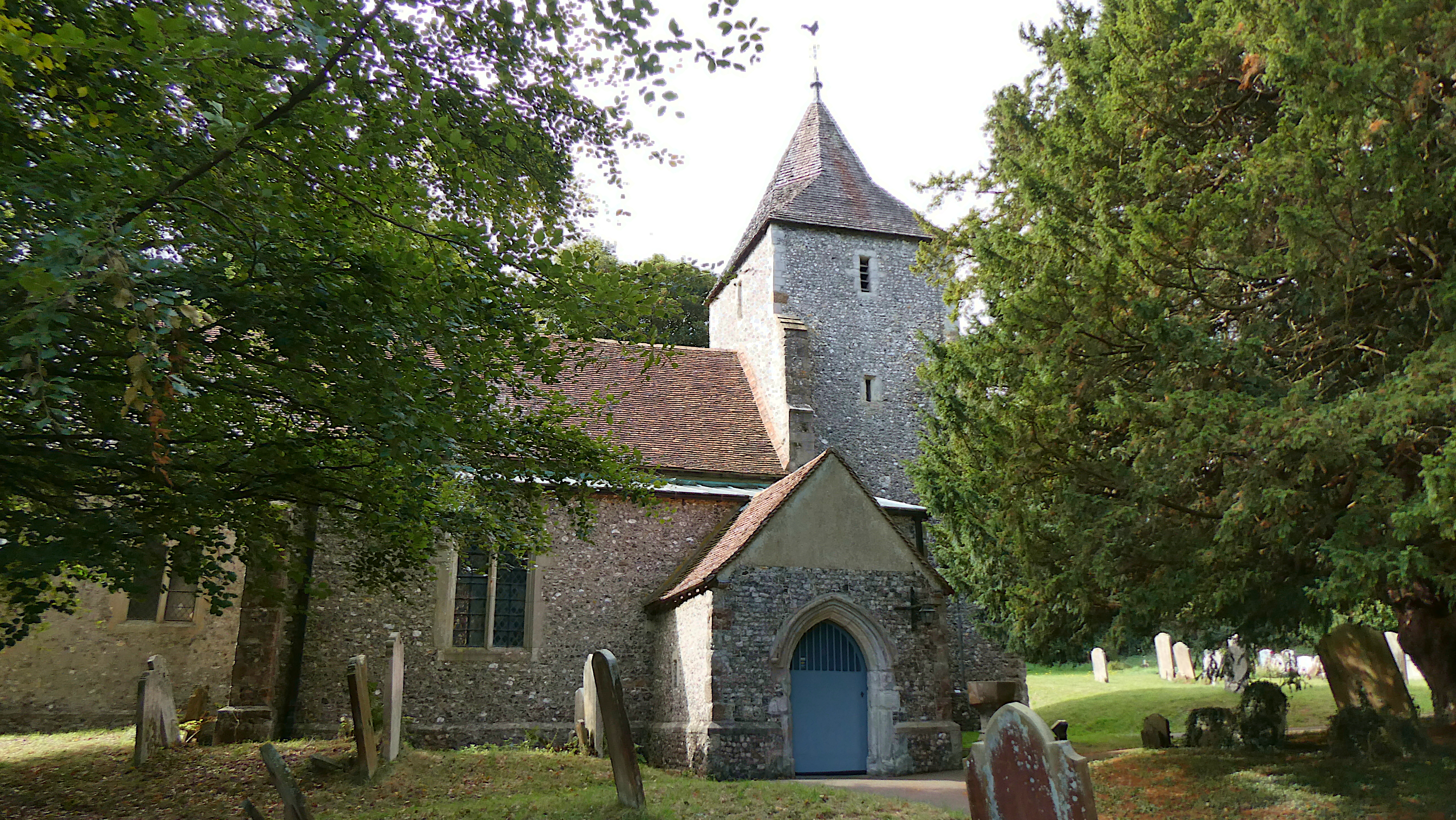
The church of St. Mary the Virgin at Stansted(Kent), England. August 2025.

The church of St. Mary the Virgin has C14 origins with later additions and restorations.

== Filming location ==
In January 2007 the village was used as a semi-fictional location in the filming of an episode of EastEnders broadcast in the United Kingdom over the Easter 2007 holiday season. Additional scenes were filmed at Wormshill and Ringlestone as ostensibly the same village location, notwithstanding they are some 20 miles (32 kilometres) from Stansted.

== Shooting ==
On 29 December 2007 the police were alerted that a man in the village was brandishing a gun. Upon arrival, the police opened fire and eventually shot and killed him. The case was investigated by the IPCC.

== BA confuse Stansted Airport with Stansted, Kent ==
In early 2007, British Airways mistakenly used inflight 'skymaps' that relocated Stansted Airport, Essex to Stansted in Kent. Skymaps show passengers their location, but the mistake was luckily not replicated on the pilots' navigation system. BA blamed outside contractors hired to make the map. "It was the mistake of the independent company that produced the software," said a spokeswoman. "The cartographer appears to have confused the vast Essex airport, which handles 25 million passengers a year, with this tiny Kent village, also called Stansted, which has a population of around 200".

== See also ==
- Listed buildings in Stansted, Kent
