= Listed buildings in Birling, Kent =

Civil Parish in Kent, England

Birling is a village and civil parish in the Tonbridge and Malling district of Kent, England. It contains 13 listed buildings that are recorded in the National Heritage List for England. Of these one is grade I and 12 are grade II.

This list is based on the information retrieved online from Historic England.

== Key ==
Grade	Criteria
I	Buildings that are of exceptional interest
II*	Particularly important buildings of more than special interest
II	Buildings that are of special interest

== Listing ==
Name	Grade	Location	Type	Completed (Note: The date given is the date used by Historic England as significant for the initial building or that of an important part in the structure's description.)	Date designated	Grid ref. (Note: The grid reference is based on the British national grid reference system, sometimes known as OSGB36, used by the Ordnance Survey.) Geo-coordinates	Notes	Entry number (Note: The "List Entry Number" is a unique number assigned to each listed building and scheduled monument by Historic England.)	Image	Wikidata
Sandhole	II				25 February 1987	TQ6937360692; 51°19′12″N 0°25′45″E		1363077	Upload Photo	Q26644925
Sandhole Farm Cottages	II				25 February 1987	TQ6942960623; 51°19′10″N 0°25′48″E		1081542	Upload Photo	Q26357002
Birling Ashes	II	Birling Road			25 February 1987	TQ6856059907; 51°18′48″N 0°25′02″E		1070556	Upload Photo	Q26324545
74, High Street	II	74, High Street			25 February 1987	TQ6780760357; 51°19′03″N 0°24′24″E		1070515	Upload Photo	Q26324469
Bank Cottae Ferndale Cottage	II	82, High Street			25 February 1987	TQ6777860332; 51°19′02″N 0°24′22″E		1070516	Upload Photo	Q26324471
Barn 60 Yards to North of Birling Lodge	II	High Street			25 February 1987	TQ6777660778; 51°19′17″N 0°24′23″E		1070518	Upload Photo	Q26324475
Birling Lodge	II	High Street			25 February 1987	TQ6778860722; 51°19′15″N 0°24′23″E		1070517	Upload Photo	Q26324473
Church of All Saints	I	High Street	church building		25 August 1959	TQ6801960604; 51°19′11″N 0°24′35″E		1070519	Church of All Saints More images	Q17530216
No 42 and Forge Adjoining to Right	II	42, High Street			25 February 1987	TQ6800060555; 51°19′09″N 0°24′34″E		1366275	Upload Photo	Q26647880
Barn to South East of Birling Place	II	Stangate Road			25 February 1987	TQ6744061570; 51°19′43″N 0°24′07″E		1363099	Upload Photo	Q26644945
Birling Place	II	Stangate Road			25 February 1987	TQ6738261568; 51°19′43″N 0°24′04″E		1363098	Upload Photo	Q26644944
Wall to East Birling Place	II	Stangate Road			25 February 1987	TQ6743761589; 51°19′44″N 0°24′07″E		1070521	Upload Photo	Q26324480
Wall to West and South of Birling Place	II	Stangate Road			25 February 1987	TQ6734261551; 51°19′42″N 0°24′02″E		1070522	Upload Photo	Q26324482

== See also ==
- Grade I listed buildings in Kent
- Grade II* listed buildings in Kent

== Sources ==
- Newman, John (2012) [1969], Kent: West and the Weald, The Buildings of England, New Haven and London: Yale University Press, ISBN 978-0-300-18509-6
