= Birling, Kent =

Village near Maidstone, Kent, England

Coordinates: 51.318990°N 0.409560°E

Birling
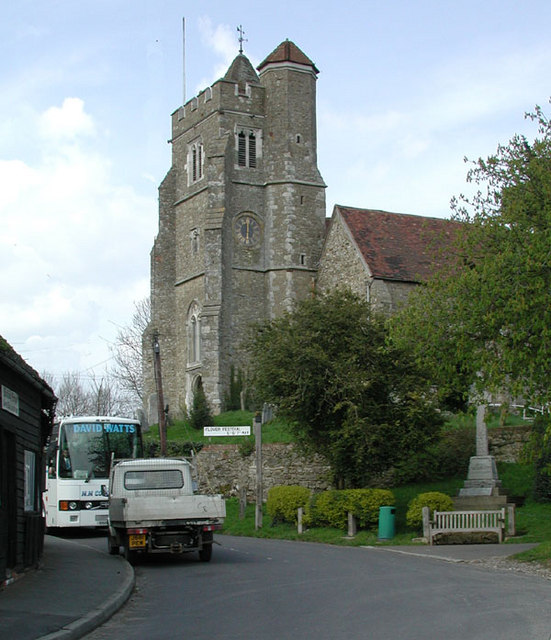
- All Saints Church, Birling

- Location within Kent
- Population: 437 (2011 Census)
- Civil parish: Birling
- District: Tonbridge and Malling
- Shire county: Kent
- Region: South East
- Country: England
- Sovereign state: United Kingdom
- Post town: West Malling
- Postcode district: ME19
- Police: Kent
- Fire: Kent
- Ambulance: South East Coast
- UK Parliament: Tonbridge

Birling is a village and civil parish in the Tonbridge and Malling district of Kent, England, about seven miles west of Maidstone. According to the 2001 census it had a population of 430 increasing to 437 at the 2011 census: 224 male and 213 female. It is south-west of the nearby town of Snodland and 37 miles away from the capital.

== Toponymy ==
The origin of the name 'Birling' is unclear, some sources believe that it signifies 'Bærla's family' with the 'ing' portion of the word coming from the Old English '-ingas' suffix meaning family or followers. Other sources mention Birling and other place names with similar spellings with the definition: 'place of the descendants of the cup-bearer or butler'.

== The Village ==
Birling is home to the Children's House Montessori School, which was previously the village school. Another notable buildings is the Nevill Bull pub, whose name derives from the Nevill family that have owned land in the area for hundreds of years. The parish itself is only 680 hectares with much of the area being pasture grounds, it lies at the foot of the chalk, Birling Hills.

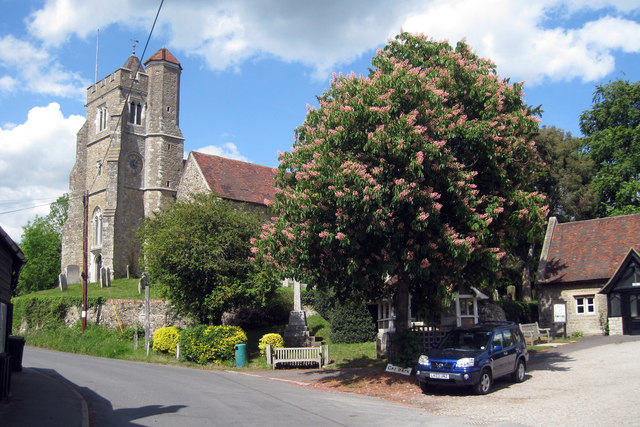
All Saints Church, Birling

=== All Saints Church (Church of All Saints) ===
Situated at the north end of the village, All Saints church, is mentioned in Domesday Book although many sources say that the main aisles and nave were actually built 300 years later in the 14th century. The chancel was rebuilt in the 16th century by the Nevill family. The church became a Grade I listed building in 1959.

=== Transport ===
Despite being a rural village, Birling is relatively well connected to its local settlements due to Maidstone being in close proximity. It is on the Addington to Maidstone bus route and although it does not have a train station, the nearest is less than 3 miles away in West Malling.

== History ==
Although there is no record of the village of Birling pre-Norman Conquest, it features in Domesday Book which was written in 1086. At that time, there were 30 households, 12 acres of meadow and pasture and 50 cattle. It also mentions the All Saints church, but major developments on the building were made around 400 years later. Around this time, a vast proportion of Kent and the surrounding areas was in possession of Odo of Bayeux, Earl of Kent. Odo was the half brother of William the Conqueror.

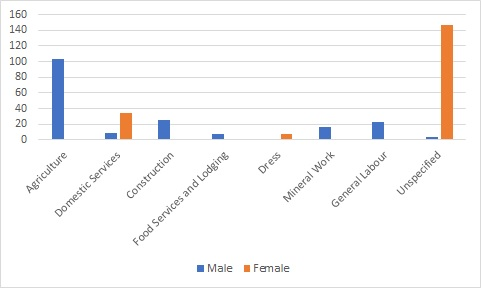
Occupational Structure of Birling, 1881.

In the 1870s, Birling was described as:

A parish in Malling district, Kent; adjacent to the river Medway, 2¾ miles WSW of Snodland r. station, and 6 NW of Maidstone. It has a post office under Maidstone. Acres, 1,883. Real property, £3,277. Pop., 662. Houses, 111. The property is subdivided.

=== Occupation Structure in 1881 ===
In 1881 a large number of people who lived in the village of Birling worked in agriculture due to the large amount of pasture ground and meadow. The majority of working women had occupations based around domestic services, food and dress however, a large proportion of women were not employed or had unspecified jobs. There was also one police officer in the village. This structure tallies with other villages in Britain.

=== The Nevill Family ===
The Nevill family have been prevalent in Birling's history as they have been in possession of Birling Estate since 1435. The family acquired the Estate when Elizabeth, daughter of Richard Beauchamp, Earl of Worcester married Sir Edward Nevill. The estate has remained in the family since, coming up to 600 years later. The family also had royal ties, with Queen Elizabeth I being recorded as coming to visit Henry Nevill in Birling as part of her travels in 1573.

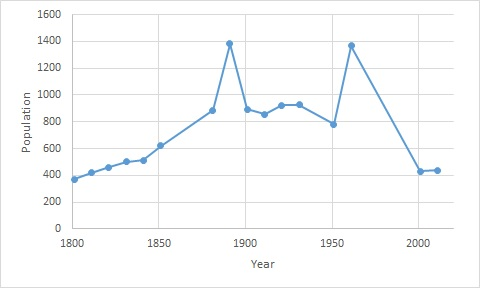
Time Series Graph for Birling, 1801–2011

== Population ==
In 2011 the population of Birling was 437, 66 more than in 1801 (371). It has however fluctuated significantly in that time. The highest population count was in 1891 at 1,384 inhabitants. After a decline, it increased to a similar level in 1960, before a slow decline to the current day.

In terms of population structure in the village, it is similar to that of the rest of the country, the majority of people are in the economically active category. However Birling has a higher mean and median average age (40.3 and 42) than the rest of the country (39.3 and 39).

== See also ==
- Listed buildings in Birling, Kent
