= Offham, Kent =

Village in Kent, England

Coordinates: 51.2906°N 0.3753°E

Offham
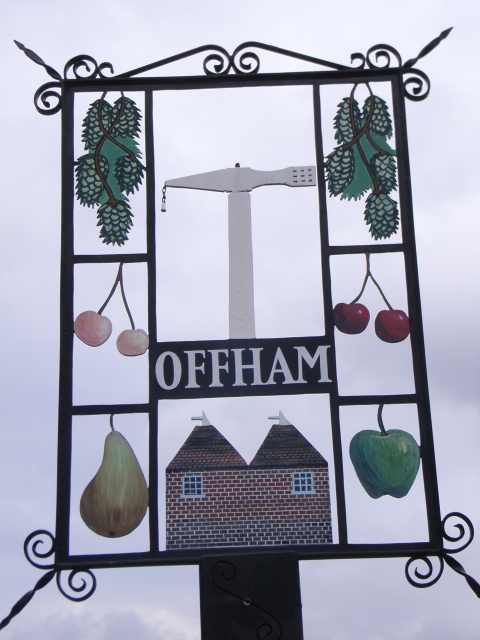

- Location within Kent
- Population: 755 (2011 Census)
- OS grid reference: TQ655575
- Civil parish: Offham
- District: Tonbridge and Malling
- Shire county: Kent
- Region: South East
- Country: England
- Sovereign state: United Kingdom
- Post town: West Malling
- Postcode district: ME19
- Dialling code: 01732
- Police: Kent
- Fire: Kent
- Ambulance: South East Coast
- UK Parliament: Tonbridge
- Website: Offham Parish Council

Offham is a village and civil parish in the local government district of Tonbridge and Malling in Kent, England, five miles to the west of Maidstone.

Offham has a quintain on the village green that was reported in medieval times for use in jousting. It is reputed to be the last English quintain in its original position, though it was removed for safekeeping during the Second World War.

The village gets its name from "Offa", the name of a Saxon landowner, and "ham", a village or homestead.

== History ==
The village has been occupied since Roman times, and the major Roman road from London to the Weald ran through the parish. Offham grew in prominence in the early ninth century under the Saxons.

The village has two entries in the Domesday Book. This shows that there were two separate estates. The first is:

The same Hugh holds OFFHAM of the bishop. (Note: Odo, Bishop of Bayeux was a half-brother of William I.) It is assessed at 1 sulung. (Note: The amount of land which could be ploughed by 4 ox-pairs) There is land for 3 ploughs. (Note: This is a unit of land measurement, not an actual plough. It is the land a plough team of eight oxen could till in a single annual season.) In demesne, nothing. There 6 villans (Note: aka villeins) with 1 boarder (Note: Landless labourer) have 2 ploughs. There is a mill rendering 50d, and 3 slaves, (Note: Slavery had existed in Saxon times, but the Normans progressively abolished it after 1102.) and 4 acres of meadow, [and] woodland for 10 pigs. TRE (Note: Tempore Regis Eduardi "In the time of King Edward" (the Confessor)) it was worth 40s; when received, 20s now 30s.Godric held it of King Edward.

The second entry follows a little later:

Ansketil holds OFFHAM of the bishop. It is assessed at 1 sulung. There is land [...]. In demesne is 1 plough; and 6 villans with 2 borders have 1 plough. There are 4 slaves, and 1 mill rendering 10s, and 7 acres of meadow, [and] woodland for 10 pigs; and in the city of Rochester 1 house rendering 30d. TRE the manor was worth 100s; when received £4, now £4.9s: what Richard of Tonbridge holds is worth 11s. Wulfric held it of Æthelnoth Cild

Jack Straw, the rebel during the reign of Richard II, is said to have been born at Pepingstraw Manor in the parish.

== Quintain ==
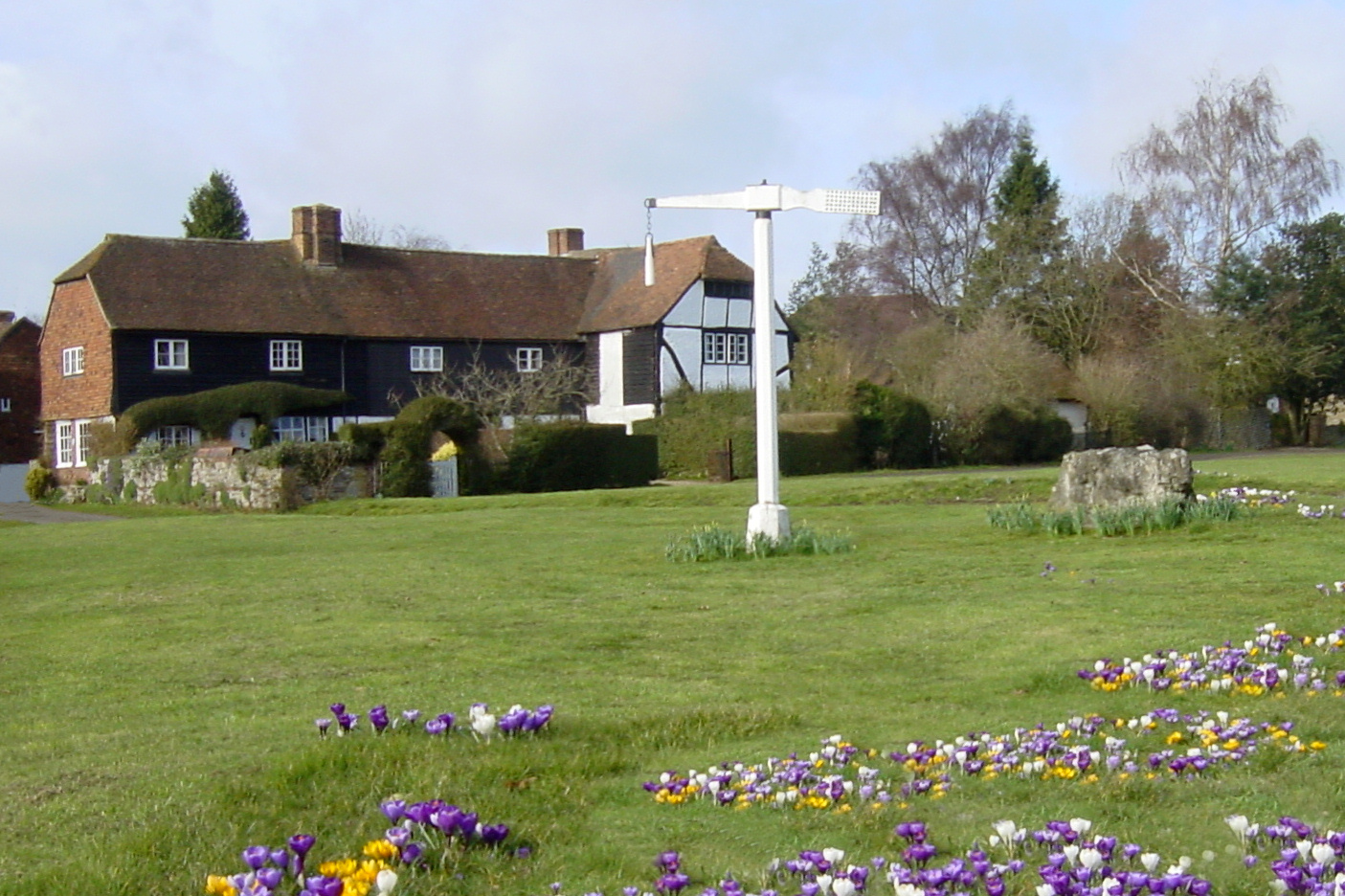
Quintain on Offham Green with crocuses, 2006

The village is famed for its medieval quintain which stands on the green, believed to be the last remaining example in the country.

The quintain consists of a wooden post around eight feet in height with a freely rotating arm on the top. One end of the arm is flat (the "eye"), with the other used to attach heavy objects such as a leather pack. In a sport dating back to perhaps Roman times, a horseman would ride at the quintain at full pace with his lance extended to strike the flat end. Should the horseman not be riding sufficiently quickly, the arm would swing around and the heavy object knock him off his horse.

== Ragstone ==
The village's houses are predominantly constructed from ragstone, Kent's most celebrated building stone. The stone has been mined in the parish since Roman times, with its hardness and durability making it a popular choice for fortifications in London and the south-east.

== Church ==
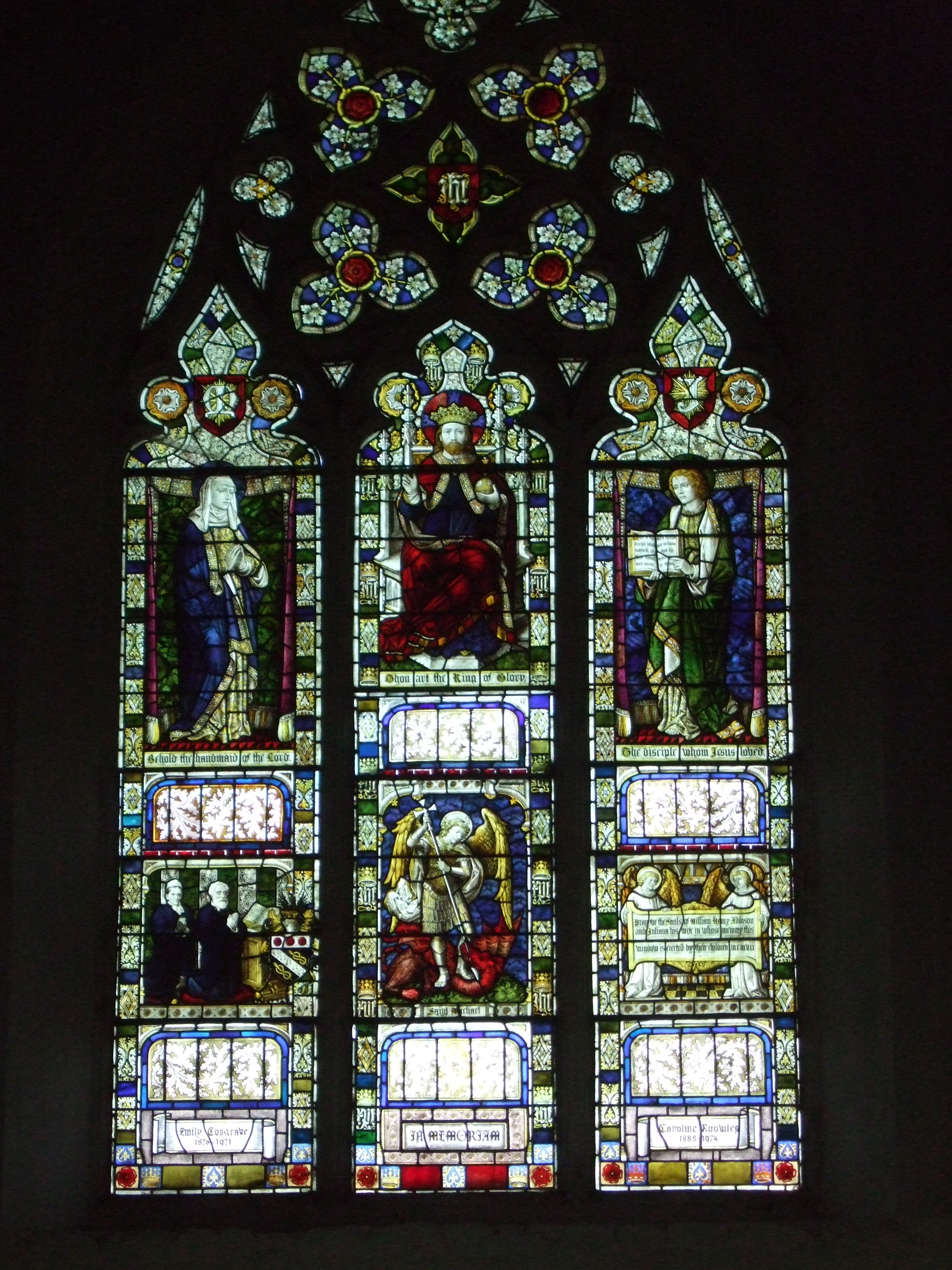
Stained glass in Offham church

The first church in the parish was founded by the Saxon lord of the manor who built a private chapel in the early ninth century. After the Norman Conquest it was replaced by a stone church and the lower stage of the tower of the present church dates from this time.

The present church is dedicated to St Michael.

== Village life ==
The village hosts annual May Day celebrations on the green; a May Queen parades through the village, accompanied by Morris Men, school children perform maypole dances, and occasionally local horseriders undertake the ancient sport of "tilting at the quintain", though a replica quintain is now used.

The King's Arms is the only remaining public house. Built-in the sixteenth century, the pub was originally two cottages, later owned by a saddler and harness maker who ran his business there until granted a licence in 1680. Offham also has its own primary school.

Offham Cricket Club plays at its ground in Church Road, with two teams in the Kent Cricket League as well as age-group sides.

== See also ==
- Listed buildings in Offham, Kent
