= Grade I listed buildings in Tonbridge and Malling =

There are over 9,000 Grade I listed buildings in England. This page is a list of these buildings in the district of Tonbridge and Malling in Kent.

== Tonbridge and Malling ==
Name	Location	Type	Completed (Note: The date given is the date used by Historic England as significant for the initial building or that of an important part in the structure's description.)	Date designated	Grid ref. (Note: Sometimes known as OSGB36, the grid reference is based on the British national grid reference system used by the Ordnance Survey.) Geo-coordinates	Entry number (Note: The "List Entry Number" is a unique number assigned to each listed building and scheduled monument by Historic England.)	Image
Church of St Margaret	Addington, Tonbridge and Malling	Church	c. 1100	25 August 1959	TQ6538558879; 51°18′18″N 0°22′16″E	1070567	Church of St Margaret More images
Aylesford Bridge	Aylesford	Bridge	14th century	25 August 1959	TQ7294158927; 51°18′11″N 0°28′46″E	1363113	Aylesford Bridge More images
Church of St Peter	Aylesford	Church	12th century	25 August 1959	TQ7293959032; 51°18′15″N 0°28′46″E	1337029	Church of St Peter More images
Gatehouse and Walls to the North and East of the Friars	Aylesford	Wall	15th century	25 February 1987	TQ7240358930; 51°18′12″N 0°28′19″E	1111775	Gatehouse and Walls to the North and East of the Friars More images
The Friars, Main Block	Aylesford	Manor House	15th century	25 August 1959	TQ7239658860; 51°18′10″N 0°28′18″E	1070570	The Friars, Main Block More images
Church of All Saints	Birling	Manor House	Early 14th century	25 August 1959	TQ6801960604; 51°19′11″N 0°24′35″E	1070519	Church of All Saints More images
Church of St Mary the Virgin	Burham	Church	C12-C15	25 August 1959	TQ7166062008; 51°19′53″N 0°27′46″E	1070523	Church of St Mary the Virgin More images
Bradbourne House	East Malling and Larkfield	Manor House	17th century	1 August 1952	TQ7036257909; 51°17′41″N 0°26′31″E	1070507	Bradbourne House More images
Church of St James	East Malling and Larkfield	Church	12th century	25 August 1959	TQ7029457080; 51°17′15″N 0°26′27″E	1099148	Church of St James More images
Clare House	East Malling and Larkfield	House	1793	1 August 1952	TQ6947357736; 51°17′37″N 0°25′45″E	1099100	Upload Photo
Stable Block and Barns 40 Yards North of Bradbourne House	East Malling and Larkfield	Barn	19th century	1 August 1952	TQ7034157965; 51°17′43″N 0°26′31″E	1348523	Stable Block and Barns 40 Yards North of Bradbourne House
Barnes Place	Golden Green, Hadlow	Kitchen	18th century OR 19th century	20 October 1954	TQ6459248116; 51°12′31″N 0°21′18″E	1363161	Upload Photo
Hadlow Castle	Hadlow	House	1951	17 April 1951	TQ6341949639; 51°13′21″N 0°20′20″E	1070451	Hadlow Castle More images
Church of St Peter	Ightham	Church	c. 1400	25 August 1959	TQ5948456930; 51°17′21″N 0°17′09″E	1071962	Church of St Peter More images
Ightham Mote	Ightham	House	At least 1340-1360	1 August 1952	TQ5847653485; 51°15′31″N 0°16′11″E	1362410	Ightham Mote More images
Church of St Lawrence	Mereworth	Parish Church	1744-1746	25 August 1959	TQ6601853752; 51°15′32″N 0°22′40″E	1186214	Church of St Lawrence More images
Mereworth Castle (main Block)	Mereworth	House	18th century	1 August 1952	TQ6689553230; 51°15′14″N 0°23′25″E	1070675	Mereworth Castle (main Block) More images
Pavilion to the North East of Mereworth Castle	Mereworth	Pavilion	Circa 1740-1750	1 August 1952	TQ6694253276; 51°15′15″N 0°23′27″E	1363025	Pavilion to the North East of Mereworth Castle
Pavilion to the North West and Stables of Mereworth Castle	Mereworth	Manor House	1740-1750	1 August 1952	TQ6686253285; 51°15′16″N 0°23′23″E	1070676	Pavilion to the North West and Stables of Mereworth Castle
Yotes Court	Mereworth	Country House	1656-1658	19 April 1985	TQ6501553307; 51°15′18″N 0°21′48″E	1363026	Yotes Court More images
Church of St Michael	Offham	Church	c. 1100	25 August 1959	TQ6602958063; 51°17′51″N 0°22′48″E	1264787	Church of St Michael More images
Fairlawne	Plaxtol	Country House	Before 1840	1 August 1952	TQ5943653430; 51°15′28″N 0°17′01″E	1072711	Fairlawne More images
Old Soar Manor	Plaxtol	Farmhouse	18th century	3 May 1984	TQ6195054103; 51°15′47″N 0°19′11″E	1281122	Old Soar Manor More images
Church of All Saints	Snodland	Parish Church	12th century	25 August 1959	TQ7076161822; 51°19′47″N 0°26′59″E	1347897	Church of All Saints More images
Church of St Peter and St Paul	Trottiscliffe	Church	c. 1200	25 August 1959	TQ6463460544; 51°19′13″N 0°21′40″E	1236191	Church of St Peter and St Paul More images
Gatehouse and Chapel to St Mary's Abbey	West Malling, Tonbridge and Malling	Abbey	Late 15th century or early 16th century	25 August 1959	TQ6822257740; 51°17′38″N 0°24′41″E	1209130	Gatehouse and Chapel to St Mary's Abbey More images
St Leonard's Tower	West Malling	Bishops Palace	1077-1108	30 November 1993	TQ6759157081; 51°17′18″N 0°24′07″E	1219087	St Leonard's Tower More images
St Mary's Abbey Chapterhouse and Library	West Malling	Abbey	Norman	25 August 1959	TQ6829157677; 51°17′36″N 0°24′44″E	1291520	Upload Photo
St Marys Abbey Convent Building	West Malling	Abbey	1735	25 August 1959	TQ6827157667; 51°17′36″N 0°24′43″E	1209132	Upload Photo
St Mary's Abbey North Wall of Cloister	West Malling	Abbey	c. 1090	25 August 1959	TQ6827557692; 51°17′37″N 0°24′43″E	1291527	Upload Photo
St Mary's Abbey Tower to Original Abbey	West Malling	Abbey	Early Norman	25 August 1959	TQ6826257703; 51°17′37″N 0°24′43″E	1292791	St Mary's Abbey Tower to Original Abbey More images
The Ancient House	West Malling	Merchants House	15th century	1 August 1952	TQ6805457787; 51°17′40″N 0°24′32″E	1292809	The Ancient House More images
Church of St Dunstan	West Peckham	Church	Saxon	25 August 1959	TQ6442652574; 51°14′55″N 0°21′16″E	1070669	Church of St Dunstan More images
Dukes Place	West Peckham	Manor House	18th century	1 August 1952	TQ6483652687; 51°14′58″N 0°21′38″E	1070672	Dukes Place More images
Church of All Saints	Wouldham	Church	11th century	25 August 1959	TQ7126364391; 51°21′10″N 0°27′29″E	1070490	Church of All Saints More images
Starkey Castle	Wouldham	House	1952	1 August 1952	TQ7138365592; 51°21′49″N 0°27′37″E	1347808	Starkey Castle More images
Church of St George	Wrotham	Church	Early 14th century	25 August 1959	TQ6118359189; 51°18′32″N 0°18′40″E	1236562	Church of St George More images
Tonbridge Castle	Tonbridge and Malling	Keep	Norman	8 May 1950	TQ5897446602; 51°11′47″N 0°16′26″E	1363369	Tonbridge Castle More images
