= Gladys Wright (disambiguation) =

Gladys Wright (1891–1980) was an English women's physical education promoter.

Gladys Wright may also refer to:

- Gladys Stone Wright (1925–2025), American band director
- Gladys Yoakum Wright (1891–1956), co-writer of the anthem "Texas, Our Texas"
