= Leybourne Lakes Country Park =

Park in Kent, England

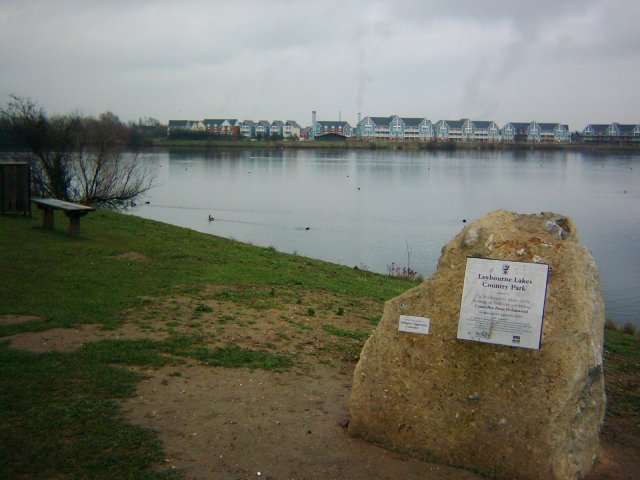
- Leybourne Lakes

- Location within Kent
- OS grid: TQ695603
- Coordinates: 51°18′59″N 0°26′00″E
- Area: 93 hectares (230 acres)
- Created: 2004
- Operator: Tonbridge & Malling Leisure Trust (trading as tmactive)
- Open: 7 days a week, dawn until dusk
- Parking: Paid parking
- Website: Leybourne Lakes Country Park

Leybourne Lakes Country Park is near Snodland, in Kent, England. The park, which opened in 2004, was created from disused gravel pits that have been flooded and landscaped to make fishing and wildlife lakes.

== History ==
In the 1930s a river fed from Leybourne led past the small hamlet of Lunsford (part of Larkfield) and then past Ham Hill (part of Snodland) into the River Medway. Snodland was once a centre of industry along the river, with papermaking and chalk quarries being the main employers in the town. A footpath leads into the park from Brook Street, Snodland, near the entrance to Brookland Lake.

The village of Larkfield (to the south of the lakes) has expanded rapidly since the M20 motorway was constructed in the 1970s and it continues to grow, with new housing developments being built. Mineral extraction also ceased in the 1970s. The gravel pits and surrounding area were designated as a Site of Nature Conservation Interest (SNCI). The site was identified in the 'Tonbridge and Malling Local Plan' for development into a country park, with the partnership of Berkeley Homes.

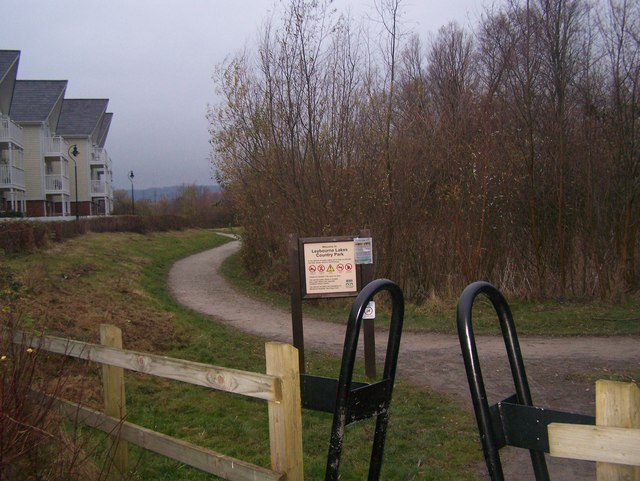
Entrance to Leybourne Lakes near the Berkeley Homes estate

The housing development of 'The Lakes in Leybourne' by Berkeley Homes (seen in the photos), was created beside one of the disused gravel pits that had been turned into man-made lakes. The decision to build on this area was unpopular with some Larkfield residents, but the remaining lakes were turned into a country park and nature reserve to offset the impact of this new housing. The lakes and reserve were later handed over to Tonbridge and Malling Borough Council in 2004 and since November 2021 have been managed by Tonbridge & Malling Leisure Trust (trading as 'tmactive'). They are the current owners and maintain the lakes and paths.

== Facilities ==
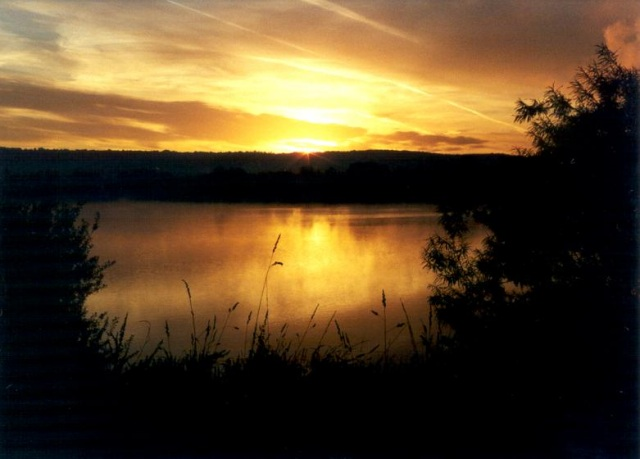
Leybourne Lakes Sunset

The 93 hectares (230 acres) of lakes now provide a peaceful location for wildlife and birdwatching, whilst also allowing watersports enthusiasts the opportunity to windsurf, canoe and kayak in the man-made lakes. Diving also takes place in one of the lakes. Around the lakes are a series of woods and gentle trails, popular with dogwalkers and recreational walkers.

A small charge is payable for use of car parking, situated close to the visitor centre which has a cafe.

Lakes in the north and west of the park are also used for angling by private fishing clubs.

Leybourne Lakes is home to Malling parkrun, which takes place every Saturday morning at 9am, incorporating two laps of the main lake. (https://www.parkrun.org.uk/malling/). The inaugural event was on October 3rd 2015.
