= TMBC =

TMBC can refer to:

- Tameside Metropolitan Borough Council, in Greater Manchester, United Kingdom
- Tonbridge and Malling Borough Council, in Kent, United Kingdom
