= Listed buildings in Kings Hill =

Historic buildings in Kent, England

Kings Hill is village and civil parish in Kent, England. It contains five grade II listed buildings that are recorded in the National Heritage List for England.

This list is based on the information retrieved online from Historic England.

== Key ==
Grade	Criteria
I	Buildings that are of exceptional interest
II*	Particularly important buildings of more than special interest
II	Buildings that are of special interest

== Listing ==
Name	Grade	Location	Type	Completed (Note: The date given is the date used by Historic England as significant for the initial building or that of an important part in the structure's description.)	Date designated	Grid ref. (Note: The grid reference is based on the British national grid reference system, sometimes known as OSGB36, used by the Ordnance Survey.) Geo-coordinates	Notes	Entry number (Note: The "List Entry Number" is a unique number assigned to each listed building and scheduled monument by Historic England.)	Image	Wikidata
Buildings 10, 20, 30, 50, 60 and 70 Former Barracks	II				16 April 2004	TQ6728755312; 51°16′21″N 0°23′48″E		1390915	Upload Photo	
Control Tower	II				16 April 2004	TQ6773255250; 51°16′18″N 0°24′11″E		1390914	Control Tower More images	Q26670290
Former Airmens Institute	II	Churchill Square			15 April 2004	TQ6718455252; 51°16′19″N 0°23′43″E		1390913	Upload Photo	
Garages to Rear of Gibson Building (Tonbridge and Malling Borough Council Offices, Former Officers Mess)	II				16 April 2004	TQ6693755559; 51°16′29″N 0°23′31″E		1390916	Upload Photo	
Gibson Building	II	Gibson Drive			29 July 1999	TQ6691655512; 51°16′28″N 0°23′30″E		1387787	Upload Photo	

== See also ==
- Grade I listed buildings in Tonbridge and Malling
- Grade II* listed buildings in Tonbridge and Malling

== Sources ==
- Newman, John (2012) [1969], Kent: West and the Weald, The Buildings of England, New Haven and London: Yale University Press, ISBN 978-0-300-18509-6
