= Medway Gap =

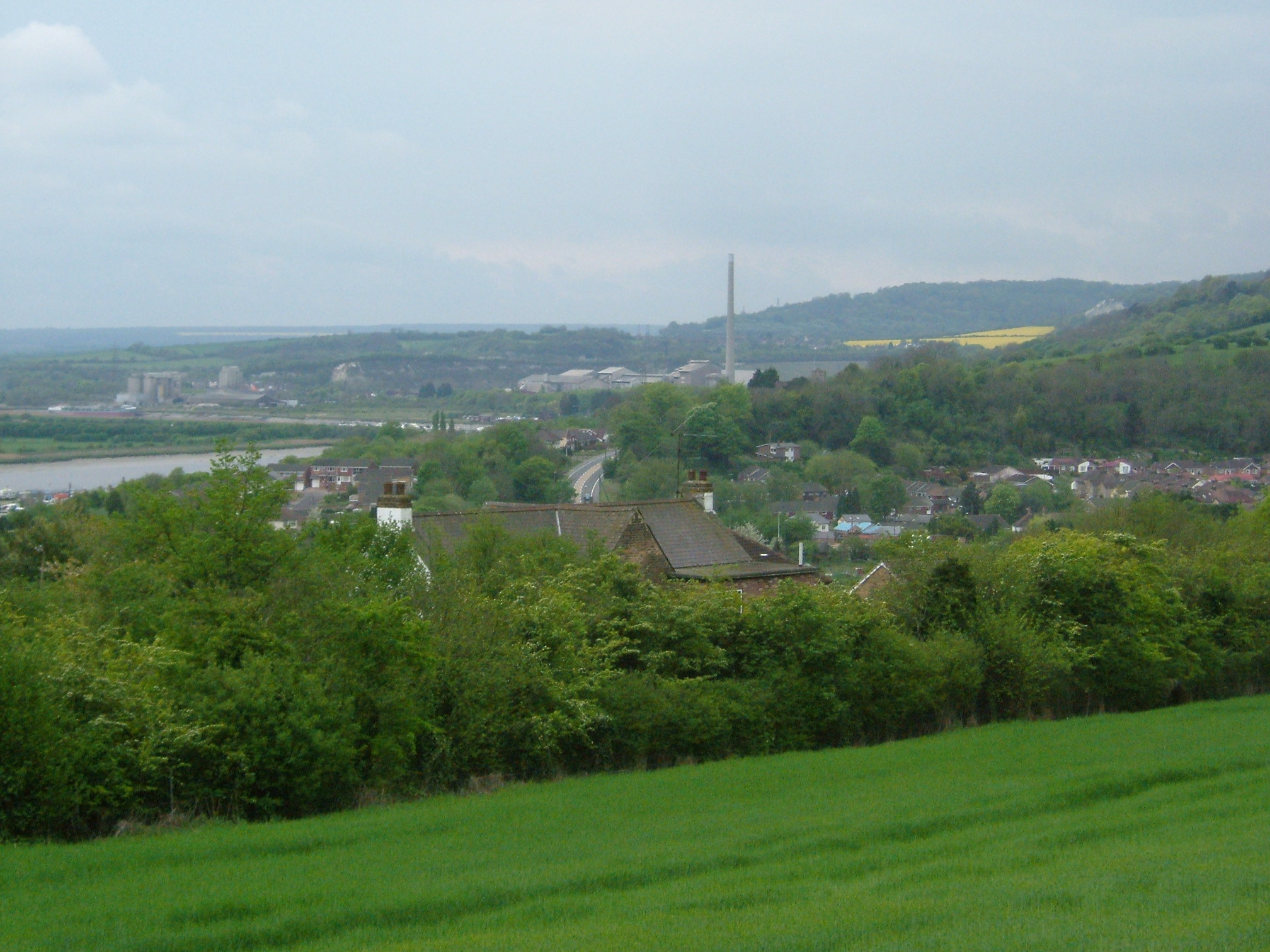
The River Medway passing through the Medway Gap. In the foreground is Cuxton with the Cement Works at Halling to the rear. The A228 is visible.

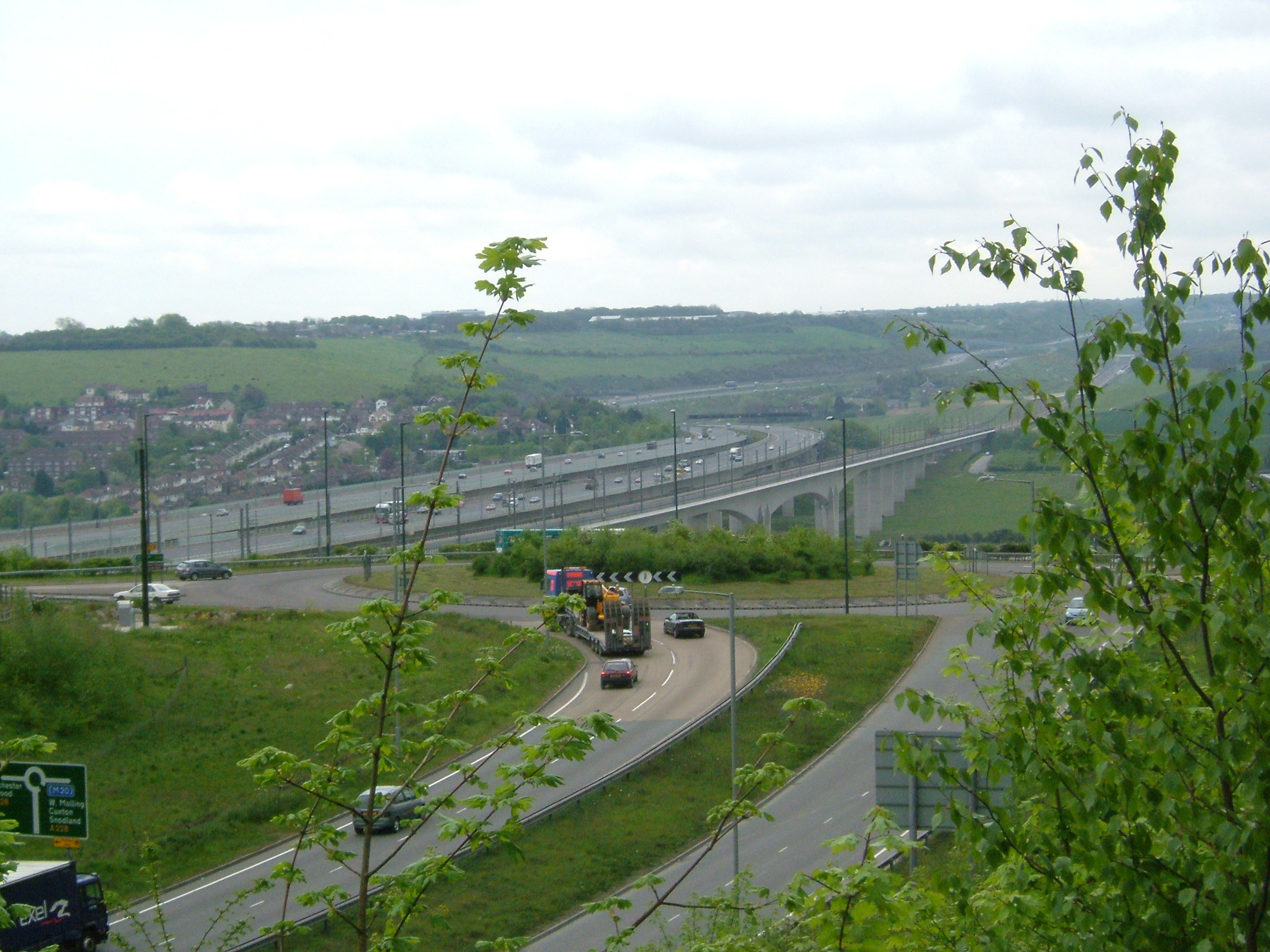
The M2 motorway, and the raillink crossing the Medway, between Cuxton and Borstal. The Nashenden valley on the other bank is typical of Kentish downland scenery.

The Medway Gap is a topographic feature in Kent, England.

It was created when the prehistoric River Medway cut roughly south to north through the line of chalk hills now known as the North Downs; other rivers such as the Darent and the Stour have similar features.

Its past significance as a means of travel is indicated by the prehistoric Medway megaliths in the area. Today the Medway Valley railway line and the A228 road both run through the valley, connecting Tonbridge, West Malling and the Medway Towns. At the north end of the Medway Gap, the river is crossed by the M2 motorway and High Speed 1 viaducts.

== Environment ==
The Gap is designated as a Biodiversity Opportunity Area by Kent County Council. It also has the effect of creating local weather patterns, thereby frequently exhibiting opposite conditions to the surrounding countryside.

== Human settlement ==
The Medway Gap in north west Kent.

In the borough of Tonbridge and Malling, the "Medway Gap" refers to the group of villages in this area i.e. Aylesford, East Malling, Larkfield and Leybourne. Much of the residential development in this area took place after World War II. Most of these settlements are in the Chatham and Aylesford constituency.
