= Leybourne =

Village in Kent, England

Coordinates: 51°18′15″N 0°25′21″E

- Village and Civil Parish
- Location within Kent
- District: Tonbridge and Malling
- Shire county: Kent
- Region: South East
- Country: England
- Sovereign state: United Kingdom
- Post town: WEST MALLING
- Postcode district: ME19
- Police: Kent
- Fire: Kent
- Ambulance: South East Coast
- UK Parliament: Maidstone and Malling

Leybourne is a village and civil parish in Kent, England situated off Junction 4 of the M20 Motorway. Leybourne is adjacent to New Hythe, Larkfield and West Malling. As of 2020, Leybourne Parish had a population of 4,372.

Historically, the area was extensively quarried, leaving a number of flooded gravel pits. These have recently been developed into Leybourne Lakes Country Park, and a housing development. Several of the houses on the development feature in the Channel 4 TV Series Cape Wrath. Nearby New Hythe was also home (until 2004) of Meridian's newsroom and studio for the South East. Leybourne's name is the origin of that of the French city Libourne.

== History ==
The church was built in Saxon times but the building was changed greatly in 1874. The Leybourne history started when the ancestor of the Leybourne family came over with William the Conqueror from France. He was granted land by William I in Yorkshire and lived there with his family for a long time. His descendant, Sir Philip Libourne, decided to live in a village in Kent called Lillieburn. The names mixed to call the place Leybourne. He built Leybourne Castle and was the first baron of Leybourne; his new name was Sir Philip Baron de Leybourne. Two people who were quite important were barons of Leybourne. The first, the baron of Leybourne, Sir Roger de Leybourne who was the great grandson of Philip, was good friends with Prince Edward (later to become Edward I). In 1270 he set off with Edward on a crusade to the Holy Land. On the way he was ill so was sent back; in France on the way to Leybourne he died. His heart was sent back to Leybourne and put in the left-hand side box of the niche; the one on the right is empty.

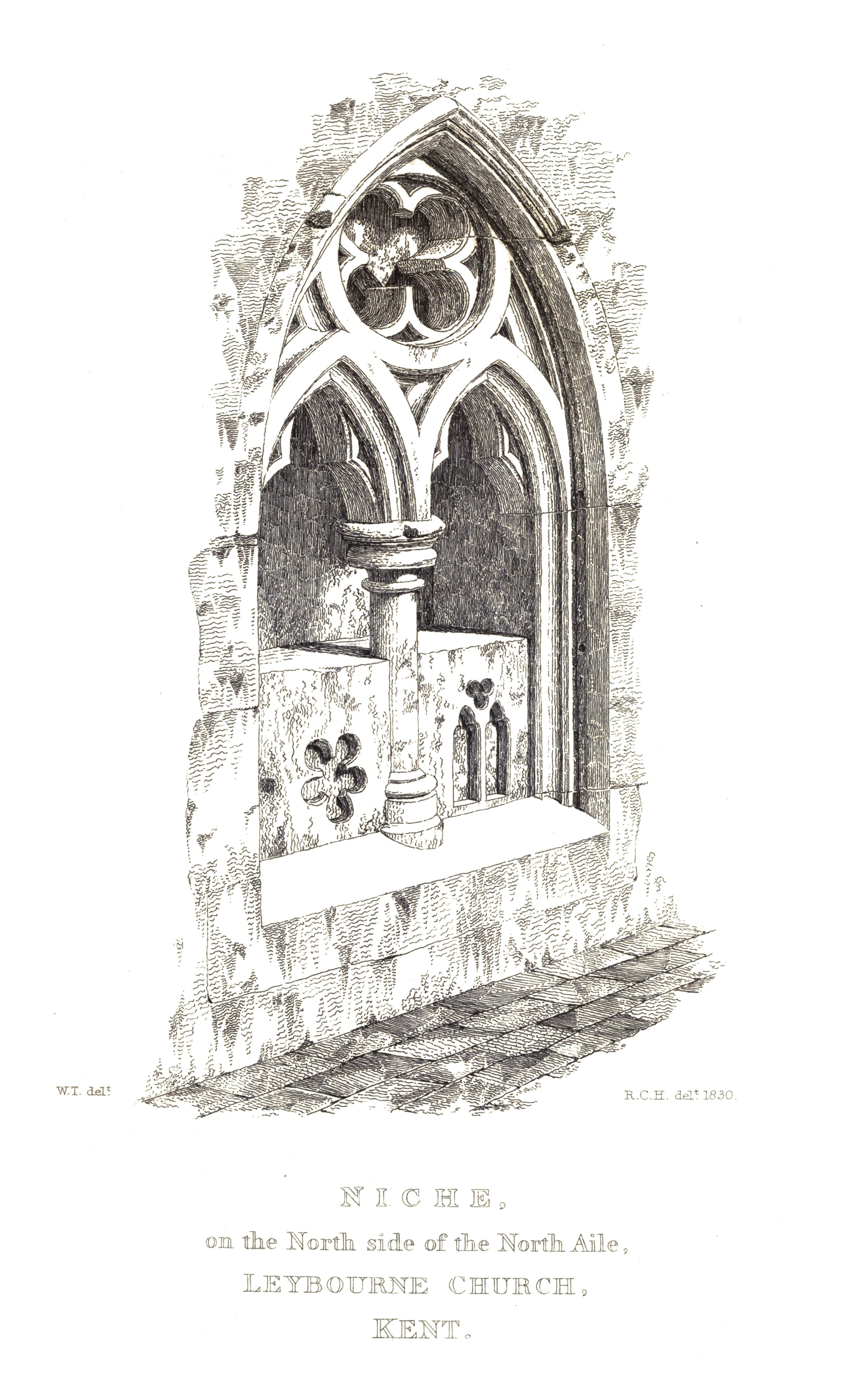
Niche on the north side of the north aile, Leybourne Church, Kent

The second is Sir William Baron de Leybourne, son of Sir Roger, who was the first Englishman to have the title admiral. On 25 October 1286 King Edward I and Queen Eleanor of Castille visited William at Leybourne Castle. They left two crowns as gifts, which hang above the wooden plaque about Sir William, which was unveiled in 1956 by Richard Talbot.

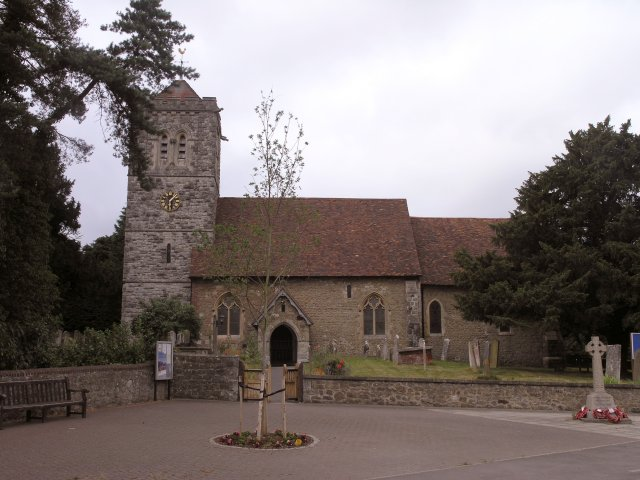
Church of Ss. Peter & Paul, Leybourne

In the church tower there were originally three bells. The tower collapsed in 1580, and was restored with two bells. On Friday 10 June 1966 lightning hit the tower and it caught fire, after which it was decided only to have one bell. The tower was Norman, but in 1874, architect Sir Arthur Blomfeld encased it in an extra layer of wall.

The Domesday Book says about Leybourne:

Adam holds Leybourne of the bishop. It is assessed at 2 sulungs. There is land. In demesne are 3 ploughs; and 16 villains with 2 bordars have 7 ploughs. There is a church, and 10 slaves, and 1 mill rendering 7s, and 12 acres of meadow, woodland for 50 pigs. In the time of King Edward it was worth £8; when received, £7; now £8. Richard of Tonbridge holds in his lowy what is worth 24s. The king holds as a recent gift from the bishop what is worth 24s2d. Thorgisl holds this manor of Earl Godwine.

The blank entry above is as shown in the Domesday Book; either it was left blank for future addition, or the original entry was erased.

== Amenities ==
Leybourne has a primary school, pre Norman-conquest church, 13th-century castle, hairdressers, shop, newsagent and general store, village hall, pub/restaurant (The Old Rectory) and Premier Inn Hotel.

Leybourne and the neighbouring town of West Malling elect three councillors to Tonbridge and Malling Borough Council. It has its own Parish Council.

There are junior football teams aging from Under 6's to Under 18's and a cricket club for adults and children on the school premises: Leybourne St Peter and St Paul Church of England Primary school (Voluntary aided).

Nearby Leybourne Lakes Country Park offer fishing, scenic walking and cycle paths plus water sports such as windsurfing and scuba diving.

In the 2000s the new settlement of Leybourne Chase was developed in the west of the parish, on the former Leybourne Grange mental hospital site.

== Bypass ==
The Leybourne bypass, a part of the A228, was opened in October 2006. It was intended to reduce traffic coming off the M20 motorway and through Leybourne along Castle Way, and to handle additional traffic from nearby Kings Hill.

== Leybourne Woods ==
Leybourne Woods is an area of wood and heathland set between the communities of Leybourne and West Malling.

== See also ==
- Listed buildings in Leybourne
