= Listed buildings in Leybourne =

Civil Parish in Kent, England

Leybourne is a village and civil parish in the Tonbridge and Malling district of Kent, England. It contains eight listed buildings that are recorded in the National Heritage List for England. Of these two are grade II* and six are grade II.

This list is based on the information retrieved online from Historic England.

== Key ==
Grade	Criteria
I	Buildings that are of exceptional interest
II*	Particularly important buildings of more than special interest
II	Buildings that are of special interest

== Listing ==
Name	Grade	Location	Type	Completed (Note: The date given is the date used by Historic England as significant for the initial building or that of an important part in the structure's description.)	Date designated	Grid ref. (Note: The grid reference is based on the British national grid reference system, sometimes known as OSGB36, used by the Ordnance Survey.) Geo-coordinates	Notes	Entry number (Note: The "List Entry Number" is a unique number assigned to each listed building and scheduled monument by Historic England.)	Image	Wikidata
Village Pump	II				25 February 1987	TQ6863958396; 51°17′59″N 0°25′03″E		1348519	Upload Photo	Q26631895
Leybourne Grange	II	Birling Road			25 February 1987	TQ6789759353; 51°18′31″N 0°24′27″E		1363096	Upload Photo	Q26644943
Stable Block 50 Yards North West of Leybourne Grange	II	Birling Road			25 February 1987	TQ6785959396; 51°18′32″N 0°24′25″E		1100247	Upload Photo	Q26392333
Church of St Peter and St Paul	II*	Castle Way, West Malling	church building		25 August 1959	TQ6894958929; 51°18′16″N 0°25′20″E		1100628	Church of St Peter and St Paul More images	Q17546860
Leybourne Castle	II*	Castle Way, West Malling	castle		25 August 1959	TQ6886658910; 51°18′15″N 0°25′16″E		1363097	Leybourne Castle More images	Q15242302
Monk's Cottage	II	99, London Road			25 February 1987	TQ6856758239; 51°17′54″N 0°24′59″E		1070513	Upload Photo	Q26324465
The Millhouse	II	London Road			25 February 1987	TQ6773058533; 51°18′04″N 0°24′17″E		1070479	Upload Photo	Q26324408
The Wheatsheaf Inn	II	London Road			25 February 1987	TQ6773558510; 51°18′04″N 0°24′17″E		1100257	Upload Photo	Q26392344

== See also ==
- Grade I listed buildings in Kent
- Grade II* listed buildings in Kent

== Sources ==
- Newman, John (2012) [1969], Kent: West and the Weald, The Buildings of England, New Haven and London: Yale University Press, ISBN 978-0-300-18509-6
