= Manor Park Country Park =

Park in Kent, England

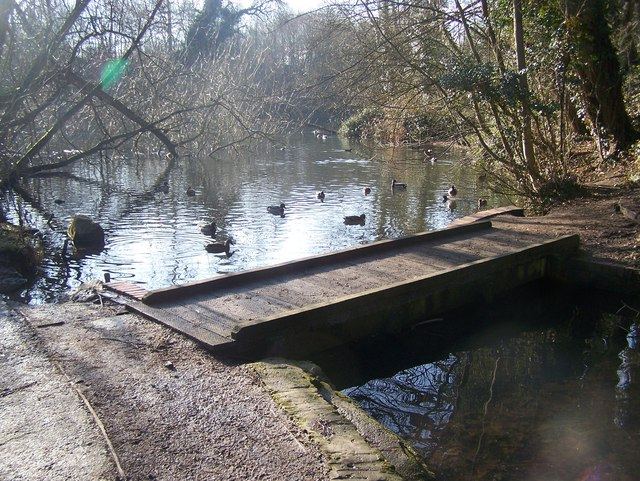
- Footbridge in Manor Park Country Park

- Location within Kent
- OS grid: TQ678571
- Coordinates: 51°17′12″N 0°24′07″E
- Area: 52 acres (210,000 m^{2})
- Created: 1973
- Operator: Kent County Council,
- Status: Open 7 days a week, dawn until dusk
- Parking: Paid car park

Manor Park Country Park is a country park in West Malling, Kent, England. The 52-acre (210,000 m^{2}) park, formerly the private gardens of the nearby Douces Manor, was purchased from the manor's owners by Kent County Council in 1973 to be converted into a public open space. The park is legally protected as public recreational land in perpetuity by Fields in Trust as part of the Queen Elizabeth II Fields Challenge.

== History ==
This Country park was bought by Kent County Council, in 1973 by using a grant aid from the Countryside Commission. The site covers 52 acres (210,000 m^{2}), part of which was the estate of the nearby 18th Century Manor House. The Grade Listed II building (formerly owned by Thomas Augustus Douce) is opposite the park (across St. Leonard's Street). It was still within the Douce family hands, until 1916, when the manor was bought by the Trustees of Fredrick Andrews to convert it into a convalescent home for ladies. The house was then used in the Second World War to accommodate airmen and was used as the headquarters and Mess for officers flying from the nearby RAF West Malling Airfield. Inside the Georgian wine cellar (of the house), 'the Twitch Inn' was established. This was so named because of all the nervous tics caused by constantly looking out for enemy aircraft, of the pilots. Names of the pilots are still etched on the walls of the cellar. Many famous air aces have frequented Douces Manor, including Sailor Malan, Stanford Tuck, Guy Gibson (a Dambusters pilot) and Wing Commander John ‘Cats Eyes’ Cunningham (a top RAF night-flight pilot) with his navigator Jimmy Rawnsley. The Twitch Inn is now designated as a Heritage Centre by the Tonbridge and Malling Borough Council and is let to the Parish Council on a peppercorn rent for 125 years. The centre opens up to 20 times a year and displays artefacts currently in the possession of the Malling Society, including Guy Gibson's uniform. Beechcroft Developments (current owners of Douces Manor) donated up to £5,000 to get the fund-raising for the heritage centre.

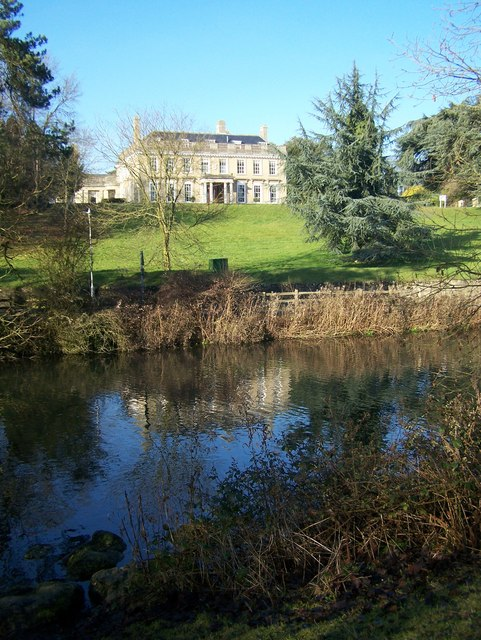
Douce's Manor - Former Manor House

== Description ==
The park is divided into four main sections;- the Lake, Douce's Meadow, Ice House Field, Abbey Field and Chestnut Paddocks.

- The Lake - a large body of water, running the length of St.Leonards Road. Thomas Douce made many alterations to the estate during his ownership, including pushing the lake further into the Parkland away from the house and making a new road beside the lake and the old St Leonards Street became his front and back drive to the manor house. This meant a lot of landscaping works were carried out. In the mid-1920s the lake froze over and was used for ice skating. The lake and its surrounding woodland are a haven for water wildlife, including mallards, coots, mute swans and moorhens. In summer, martins and swallows visit the lake.
- Douce's Meadow - Large parkland meadow, in the past it had wide open views across towards the house and West Malling Church.
- Ice House Field - a smaller meadow (across the lake) that takes its name from the site of a former ice house. The sunken brick constructed chamber, with a concrete floor, would have been used to store ice taken from the lake in winter for use in the Manor House kitchen throughout the year. During the Second World War, the field on which the ice house is situated was used as a prison camp for interned Germans. It was capped in 1963 on health and safety grounds and then concealed under an earth mound. It is No.40 on a list of 64 known ice houses in Kent, according to English Heritage. The meadow around it, has many meadow plants growing within it including oxeye daisies, buttercups and the (uncommon) yellow rattle. This small plant has yellow flowers, whose ripe seeds rattle in the plant - when dry.
- Abbey Field and Chestnut Paddocks - two larger fields (to the west of the estate) used mainly for grazing cattle during various parts of the year, helping promote further wildlife and plant life diversity within the park. Chestnut Paddocks takes its name from a large group of ancient sweet chestnut trees growing near the middle of the field.

Adjacent to the country park is St Leonard's Tower.

The country park has previously hosted a Kent Big Weekend Event.

Two public footpaths lead through the park. Ref No's MR141 and MR142. As well as various other trails within the park and around the lake.

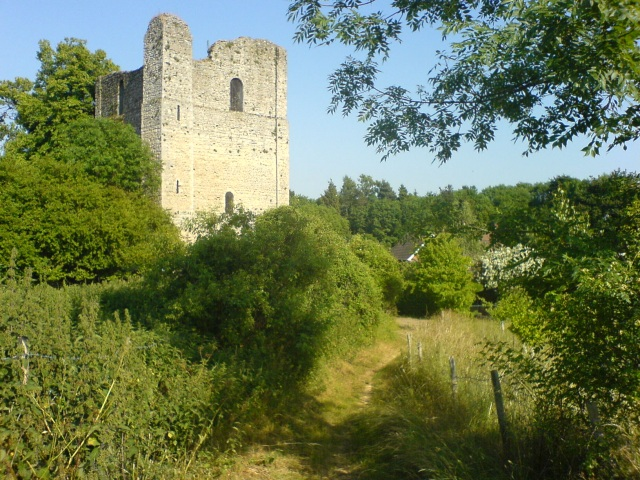
St. Leonard's Tower

The park also is accredited with a Green Flag Award by Natural England.

== Location ==
The park is situated on St. Leonard's Road between West Malling and Kings Hill, not far from the A228 West Malling bypass. The park's car park operates a Pay and Display for parking fees.
