= William Perfect =

British surgeon (1734–1809)

William Perfect (1734–1809) was a British surgeon, obstetrician, early psychiatrist, pioneer of humane treatment of mental illness, Freemason, and poet.

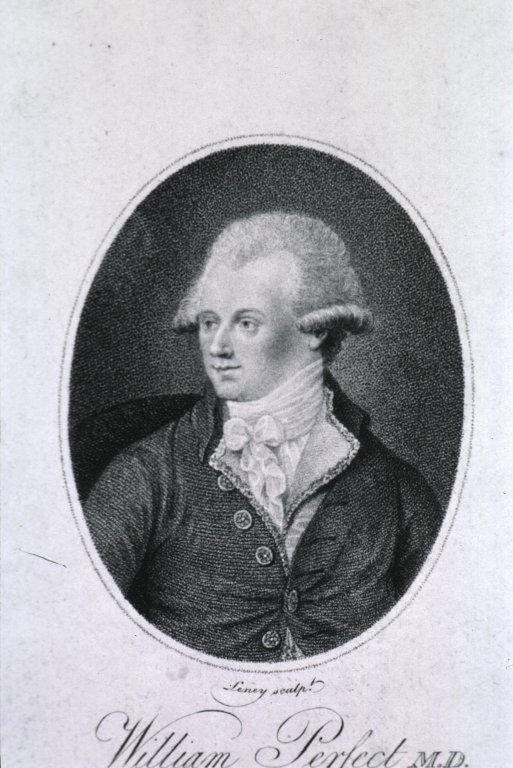
William Perfect, M.D.

He was born in Oxford, England, the son of William Perfect (1712–1757), a clergyman of Huguenot extraction who was vicar of East Malling, Kent, from 1745. In 1749, Perfect apprenticed under William Everred, a London surgeon, for seven years and attended lectures by Colin MacKenzie, a Scottish obstetrician. He opened his medical and obstetric practice in High Street, West Malling, Kent in 1756, and he obtained his Medicinae Doctor (M.D.) from St Andrews University in 1783. He published three editions of his book, Cases in Midwifery, 1781–1787, and each edition contained case reports describing in detail the conditions of the patients and the treatments which were administered. He is a distant relative of the Stratford and Taylor families.

In the 1760s, with Humphrey Porter, a doctor at Aylesford, Kent, Perfect conducted an extensive programme of inoculation against smallpox, in Kent and further afield. Also in the 1760s, he began to accommodate mentally ill people in his home, a practice that continued until his death in 1809, when his son George took over until 1815. The West Malling Asylum, which soon after moved to Malling Place, West Malling, continued to function through the 20th century as a principal private mental hospital in the county.

Perfect published a series of psychiatric case reports in several editions from 1778 to 1809, originally entitled Methods of Cure in Some Particular Cases of Insanity, later Select Cases in the Different Species of Insanity, and finally Annals of Insanity. In the edition in 1809, Perfect wrote that he was presenting the results of his practice and observations. In advertising the second edition, he offered a revised, corrected, and enlarged book. Cases of mania and depression were described in detail as well as cases of alcoholism, and attempted and successful suicides. The treatments prescribed to patients were recorded in detail, including the medications prescribed by the physician. Electricity was used with good results in some cases. He was convinced of the role of heredity, and recognized the involvement of the brain, its vessels, and its membranes. In one case report, he noted how "gentle treatment contributed much to the case and should always be adopted in preference to rigorous measures (where possible)… The proper management … is more to be depended upon than medicine, but when both are judicially and humanely blended, the patient has always the best chance of recovery."

Perfect joined the Freemasons in 1765, following the early death of his first wife Elizabeth Shrimpton (1735–1763), and became Provincial Grand Master of Kent from 1795 until his death. In 1795, the Freemasons' magazine published his memoirs. He published prose and poetry: A Bavin of Bays in 1763, and a two-volume collection, The Laurel-Wreath, in 1766.

Perfect died in June 1809, and was buried in East Malling churchyard.

== Works ==
- Perfect, William (1778). Methods of Cure, in some Particular Cases of Insanity: the Epilepsy, Hypochondriacal Affection, Hysteric Passion, and Nervous Disorders, ... Rochester: T. Fisher. Accessed 24 November 2021
- Perfect, William (1780). Cases of Insanity, the Epilepsy, Hypochondriacal Affection, Hysteric Passion, and Nervous Disorders, Successfully Treated ... Rochester: T. Fisher. Accessed 24 November 2021
- Perfect, William (1781–1783). Cases in Midwifery: With References, Quotations, and Remarks. Rochester: T. Fisher..volume 1.volume 2. Accessed 24 November 2021
- Perfect, William (1787). Annals of Insanity, Comprising a Selection of Curious and Interesting Cases in the Different Species of Lunacy, Melancholy, or Madness with the Modes of Practice in the Medical and Moral Treatment, as Adopted in the Cure of Each. London. Accessed 24 November 2021
- Perfect, William. A Remarkable Case of Madness, with the Diet and Medicines, Used in the Cure … Rochester: W. Gillman, 1791.

== Bibliography ==
- Andrews, Jonathan, et al. The History of Bethlem. London; New York: Routledge, 1997.
- Black, Shirley Burgoyne (1995). An 18th Century Mad-Doctor: William Perfect of West Malling. Otford, Kent: Darenth Valley Publications. ISBN 0950733474.
- Black, Shirley Burgoyne (2004). Perfect, William: entry in Oxford Dictionary of National Biography. Oxford University Press. ISBN 019956244X.
- Hunter, Richard A., and Ida Macalpine. Three Hundred Years of Psychiatry, 1535–1860: A History Presented in Selected English Texts. London: Oxford Univ. Press, 1963.
- Parry-Jones, William LI. The Trade in Lunacy: A Study of Private Madhouses in England in the Eighteenth and Nineteenth Centuries. London: Routledge & Kegan Paul, 1972.
- Porter, Roy. Madmen: A Social History of Madhouses, Mad-Doctors & Lunatics. Stroud, Gloucestershire, UK: Tempus, 1987, 2004.
- Scull, Andrew T. The Most Solitary of Afflictions: Madness and Society in Britain, 1700–1900. New Haven: Yale Univ. Press, 1993.
