= St Leonard's Tower, West Malling =

Grade I listed architectural structure in the United Kingdom

St Leonard's Tower
- West Malling, Kent
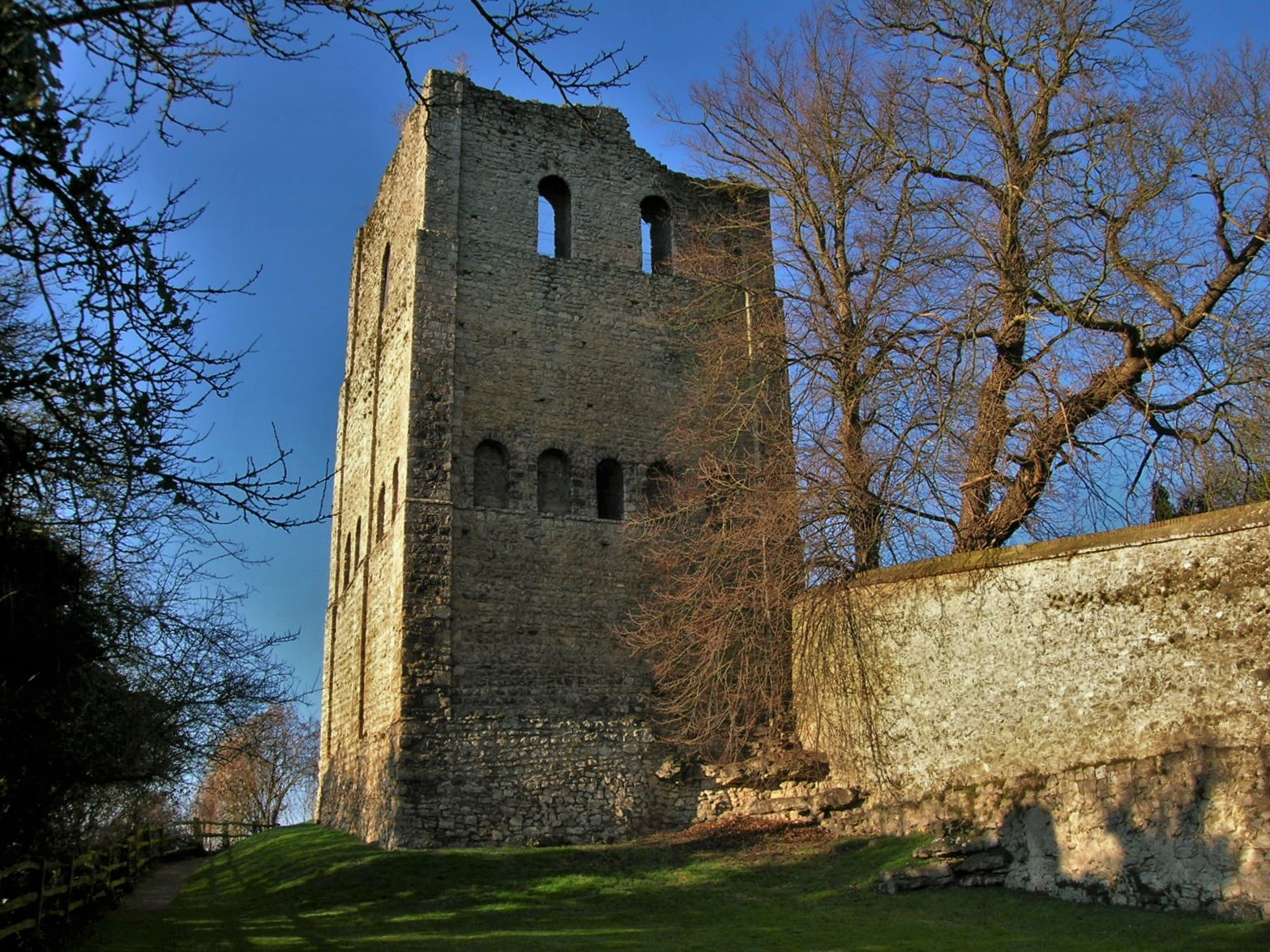
- The tower, seen from the south-east

Site information
- Controlled by: English Heritage
- Open to the public: Yes
- Condition: Ruined

Location
- Location within Kent
- Coordinates: 51°17′17.68″N 0°24′6.87″E

Site history
- Materials: Kentish ragstone and tufa

St Leonard's Tower is a probable Norman keep in West Malling, in the county of Kent, England. The tower was probably built by Gundulf, the Bishop of Rochester, between 1077 and 1108. It was a three-storey building, constructed of local stone, and would have stood at least 22 metres (72 ft) high. At a later point, probably during the English Civil War, the tower was deliberately damaged to prevent it being used for military purposes, and its uppermost storey was demolished. Concerns grew about the tower's condition in the 20th century and in 1937 it was taken into the guardianship of the state. In the 21st century, it is managed by English Heritage and the exterior is open to visitors.

== History ==
=== Medieval period ===
St Leonard's Tower was constructed in the manor of West Malling, probably between 1077 and 1108, although its exact origins are unclear. Early theories proposed that the tower was a part of St Leonard's Church, the first records of which date from around 1120. This theory suggested that the tower was built by Gundulf, the Bishop of Rochester from 1077 onwards, who owned the manor and constructed Malling Abbey, a nearby nunnery. The tower could have acted as a bell tower for the church, which survived until the rest of the building was destroyed in the 18th century.

Most recent studies have disputed that the tower was ever part of a church, arguing instead that it was a small Norman keep. Architecturally, the tower closely resembles other square keeps of the period. If it was an ecclesiastical building, it would have been extremely large in comparison with the rest of the relatively small church, and there is no evidence to indicate that it ever had a religious function.

It remains likely, however, that it was constructed by Gundulf, based primarily on the history of the land holdings during the period. After the founding of the abbey, which Gundulf granted some of his lands around West Malling, St Leonard's became the administrative centre of Gundulf's remaining estates, before also being given to the nuns a few years later, shortly after his death in 1108. In practice, probably only Gundulf would therefore have had the time or motivation to build such a keep during this period. (Note: An alternative candidate for the construction work, suggested by English Heritage, may have been Odo of Bayeux, the Earl of Kent, who owned lands in the region.)

=== Later history ===
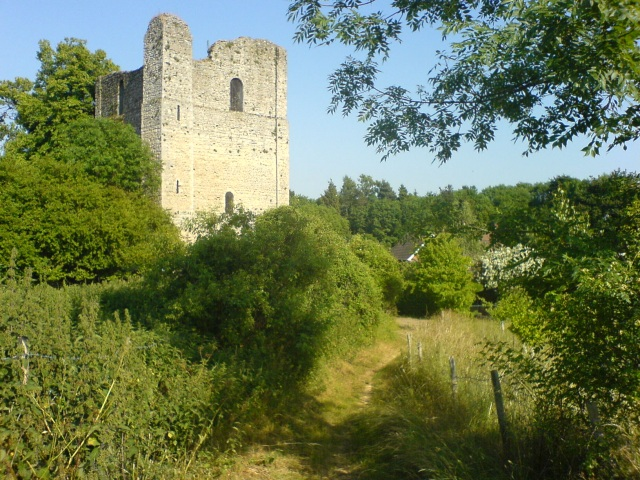
The tower, seen from the north-west

At some point in the post-medieval period, the tower was deliberately damaged to put it beyond military use, a process called slighting. This probably occurred towards the end of the English Civil War, after the defeat of the Royalist forces in Kent at the Battle of Maidstone. The tower was then owned by Sir John Rayney of Wrotham Place, a Royalist, and would have been an effective lookout tower in any future conflict. There appears to have been an attempt to bring down the whole tower by damaging the stair turret at its base, possibly using gunpowder, which failed due to the spiral staircase's unusually strong design. After this the upper storey of the tower was carefully removed instead, leaving the building roofless.

Various studies of the tower took place from the late 18th century onwards. The antiquarian Francis Grose noted in 1783 that the tower was then called the Old Jail, recording a local tradition that the abbey had used the basement as a dungeon, and the upper storeys as a prison for lesser offences. During this period, the tower was used for drying and stowing hops, probably in advance of their being taken to local kilns. The artist J. M. W. Turner visited and sketched the tower around 1791. A group of French antiquarians visited in 1840, and commented on the considerable age of the building. Around 1863, a hole in the west wall, left by the attempted destruction of the stair turret, was filled with a new entrance way.

In 1915, the owner of the tower, H. J. Wood, discussed selling it to the Commissioners of Works, proposing a price of approximately £1,500; the negotiations broke down. (Note: The equivalent modern value of a £1,500 purchase in 1913 depends on the measure used; in 2016, it could equate to between £128,000 (using a GDP Deflator) and £952,000 (using a share of GDP measure).) By the 1930s, local magistrates expressed concern about the tower and the risk that it might fall over onto the grounds of a neighbouring private asylum, the Kent Sanatorium, endangering the patients. As an alternative to demolition, it was taken into the guardianship of the Office of Works in 1937.

In the 21st century, St Leonard's Tower is managed by English Heritage and the exterior is open to visitors. It is protected under UK law as a Grade I listed building.

== Architecture ==
Simplified ground floor plan: A – entrance and spiral staircase; B – original entrance, blocked

St Leonard's Tower is located on the edge of the village of West Malling, on a sandstone promontory, overlooking a valley leading down to the river River Medway. The base of the tower rests directly on the rock, levelled up with masonry to form a plinth. The tower was probably originally surrounded by service buildings, possibly within a walled enclosure, part of which may survive in the stone wall running from the castle to the north-east.

The square tower, or keep, is built of layers of local Kentish ragstone rubble and masonry, with white and grey tufa ashlar detailing and facing. After the post-medieval slighting, it forms a two-storey building around 18 metres (59 ft) high; it would previously been three storeys and at least 22 metres (72 ft) high. The tower is 10 metres (33 ft) across externally, with walls 2 metres (6 ft 7 in) thick. It has corner pilaster buttresses, the north-west buttress forming a corner tower, and a central buttress on the north side. The north-east and south-east sides of the tower are decorated with arcades of round-headed arches.

The basement is lit by windows set high in the walls; the original entrance to the tower is positioned in the north-east corner, about 3 metres (9.8 ft) from the ground outside, although this has been blocked up since at least 1772, and replaced by a new entrance in the north-west corner at ground level. The first floor has larger windows, and a stone seat overlooking the original entrance, possibly used by a porter to watch the entrance. The first floor may have been used for formal events, and the tower's upper floors may have provided chambers for the bishop and his staff. The floors are linked by a spiral staircase contained in the north-west tower; unusually, the staircase was built without a central newel and was particularly wide for the period.

== Missing key ==
In 1973 a large brass key to the tower went missing. In December 2020 it was returned to English Heritage anonymously by post, with an apology for the delay. The locks had been changed in the meantime.

== See also ==
- Castles in Great Britain and Ireland
- List of castles in Kent

== Bibliography ==
- Anonymous (1905). "St Leonard's Tower: Some Aspects of Anglo-Norman Building Design and Construction". The Archaeological Journal. 62: 176–189.
- Fry, Sebastian (2014). "A History of the National Heritage Collection: Volume Five: 1931–1945". Research Report Series. London, UK: English Heritage. ISSN 2046-9799.
- Grose, Francis (1783). The Antiquities of England and Wales, Volume 3. London, UK: S. Hooper. OCLC 1369409.
- Guy, Neil (2000–2001). "The 14th Annual Conference of the Castle Studies Group: The Castles of Kent and East Sussex 6–9 April 2000" (PDF). Castle Studies Group Newsletter (14): 3–6.
- Hasted, Edward (1798). The History and Topographical Survey of the County of Kent, Volume 4 (2nd ed.). Canterbury, UK: W. Bristow. OCLC 221582961.
- Hope, W. H. St J. (1903). "English Fortresses and Castles of the Tenth and Eleventh Centuries". The Archaeological Journal. 60: 72–90. doi:10.5284/1068126.
- Mackenzie, James D. (1896). The Castles of England: Their Story and Structure. New York, U.S.: Macmillan. OCLC 504892038.
- North, Michael (2001). "St Leonard's Tower: Some Aspects of Anglo-Norman Building Design and Construction". Archaeologia Cantiana. 121: 269–286.
- Shapland, Michael (2012). Buildings of Secular and Religious Lordship: Anglo-Saxon Tower-nave Churches (Ph.D.). London, UK: University College London.
