= Tony Hudgell =

British fundraiser (born 2014)

Tony Hudgell BEM
- Born: Tony Smith; 8 October 2014 (age 12); Maidstone, Kent, England
- Years active: 2020–present
- Known for: Being abused by his biological mother and father at 41 days old, and for fundraising during the COVID-19 pandemic
- Awards: Points of Light award (2020); Pride of Britain Award: Good Morning Britain Young Fundraiser of the Year (2020); British Citizen Youth Award (BCyA) (2021); British Empire Medal (2024)
- Website: tonyhudgellfoundation.org

Antony Jasper Hudgell BEM (born Tony Smith; 8 October 2014) is a British fundraiser and recipient of Pride of Britain and UK Points of Light awards.

In 2020, aged five, inspired by Captain Tom Moore’s fundraising walk, he walked 10 kilometres (6.2 mi) on his prosthetic legs throughout June 2020 and raised £1.8 million for the Evelina London Children's Hospital (NHS), where he had received care after receiving life-changing injuries inflicted by his birth parents when he was a baby.

Hudgell also inspired English law changes. "Tony's Law", enacted in the Police, Crime, Sentencing and Courts Act 2022, increased prison sentences for those convicted of child cruelty and neglect. And, in February 2026, a campaign for a new child safety register resulted in an amendment to the Crime and Policing Bill.

== Early life ==
Originally known as Tony Smith, Hudgell was the son of birth parents Jody Simpson and Anthony Smith, from Whitstable, Kent. In their Maidstone flat, described by the Kent and Sussex Courier as "filthy", the couple inflicted such severe injuries on their six-week-old baby that his legs eventually had to be amputated. He had been assaulted at 41 days old, resulting in multiple fractures, dislocations and blunt trauma to the face. He was left untreated and in agony for 10 days, causing organ failure, toxic shock and sepsis.

Tony was treated at Evelina London Children's Hospital; he suffered eight limb fractures and head trauma which left him deaf in one ear, and had to have 23 operations and eight blood transfusions. Aged three, he had a double amputation at the knees, and his hip is permanently dislocated. He was adopted by Mark and Paula Hudgell of Kings Hill in Kent, and renamed Tony Hudgell.

In the 2023 New Year Honours, Paula Hudgell was appointed an Officer of the Order of the British Empire (OBE) for services to children.

=== Birth parents' convictions ===
In February 2018, his birth parents were convicted of child cruelty offences and given 10-year prison sentences (the maximum then available) at Maidstone Crown Court. Simpson and Smith later applied for their sentences to be reduced; Simpson subsequently discontinued her appeal, while Smith's appeal was rejected. While in prison in August 2018, Smith was attacked by fellow inmates at HMP Swaleside. After serving five years in prison, including time spent on remand before their trial, Smith and Simpson were set to be released in August 2022.

The case of Simpson, earlier transferred to an open prison and who was set to be released at the halfway point on 12 August 2022, was referred to the Parole Board by the Justice Secretary Dominic Raab. In December 2022, the High Court ruled Raab's bid to delay the release of Simpson from prison was unlawful. Raab appealed against the decision but was overruled, and in February 2023 Simpson was released. However, Simpson subsequently formed a relationship with a sex offender, breaching her release licence conditions, and in May 2024 was recalled to prison, where - like Smith - she had been subject to threats and attacks from other prisoners.

On 28 August 2022, Smith's release was also placed on hold and his case referred to the Parole Board. In June 2023, Smith's application to the Parole Board was rejected and he was set to remain in prison until the end of his sentence in September 2027.

Following further separate parole board hearings, both in June 2025, Simpson and Smith were granted early release from prison in June and July 2025 respectively after spending seven years behind bars.

== Life after injury ==
=== Fundraising ===
In June 2020, aged five and inspired by Captain Tom Moore's NHS fundraising during the COVID-19 pandemic, Tony Hudgell set out to raise £500 for Evelina London Children's Hospital by walking 10 km (6.2 mi) on his prosthetic legs. The figure quickly topped £1 million, with the final amount raised totalling £1.7 million.

The Tony Hudgell Foundation aims to enhance the lives of children who have been affected by physical, emotional and psychological abuse. In December 2025, the Foundation raised more than £120,000 to take families affected by abuse on a Christmas trip to Lapland.

=== Honours and awards ===
Hudgell received a Points of Light award in September 2020. At a Points of Light reception at 10 Downing Street on 9 August 2022, Hudgell was thanked by the UK Prime Minister Boris Johnson for his fundraising efforts, and for inspiring legal changes — 'Tony's Law' — to prevent future suffering.

Hudgell was also presented with a Pride of Britain Award in November 2020, under the ‘Good Morning Britain Young Fundraiser’ category and received a British Citizen Youth Award at the House of Lords in October 2021.

Hudgell was awarded the British Empire Medal (BEM) in the 2024 New Year Honours for services to the prevention of child abuse. He is the youngest ever recipient of the medal. He was invited to a royal garden party in May 2024, but after being unable to attend due to a M20 traffic jam, received a fresh invitation from Buckingham Palace. He attended a private gathering with Queen Camilla in London on 26 June 2024, when he also received his BEM.

=== Football ===
In September 2020, Hudgell became the first-team mascot of Kings Hill FC. A supporter of Chelsea, he was presented with Chelsea UEFA Champions League tickets on his 7th birthday on the ITV breakfast show This Morning in October 2021, and he joined the English Lionheart squad, the Football Association's group of 23 everyday heroes – "inspirational individuals who went above and beyond during the nation’s fight against the COVID-19 pandemic".

== Legal impacts ==
=== 'Tony's Law' ===
In 2018, the Hudgells started a petition to campaign for tougher sentences for child cruelty and neglect, and their cause was taken up by their local MP for Tonbridge and Malling, Tom Tugendhat, who introduced a Child Cruelty (Sentences) Bill in the House of Commons in 2019. The Bill did not progress after the December 2019 United Kingdom general election, but in September 2020 Tugendhat urged its reintroduction and the government said it would hold further discussions.

'Tony's Law' was eventually enacted in the Police, Crime, Sentencing and Courts Act 2022 and introduced tougher sentencing powers, including potential life sentences, for child abusers in England and Wales. The maximum sentence for causing or allowing a child's death was increased from 14 years to life, while the maximum penalty for causing serious harm to a child was increased from 10 to 14 years.

=== Child safety register ===
In February 2026, the Hudgells' campaign for a new child safety register was set to succeed. Parents guilty of neglect will face similar monitoring to sex offenders following an amendment to the Crime and Policing Bill. The register will cover child neglect, child abuse, abandonment, female genital mutilation and infanticide. Registrants will need to inform police if they move house, change identity, travel abroad or live with children after serving their sentence.
