= A228 road =

Road in Kent, England

A228

Route information
- Length: 31.1 mi (50.1 km)

Major junctions
- North end: Lower Stoke; 51.4528°N 0.6352°E
- M2 M20; A2; A20; A21; A26 A264 A289
- South end: Pembury; 51.1427°N 0.3065°E

Location
- Country: United Kingdom
- Primary destinations: Royal Tunbridge Wells; Maidstone; Rochester; Tonbridge; West Malling; Kings Hill; Snodland

Road network
- Roads in the United Kingdom; Motorways; A and B road zones

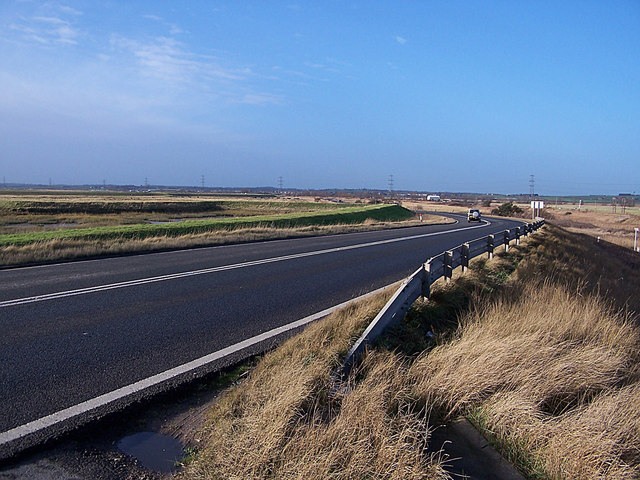
The embryonic A228 on Grain

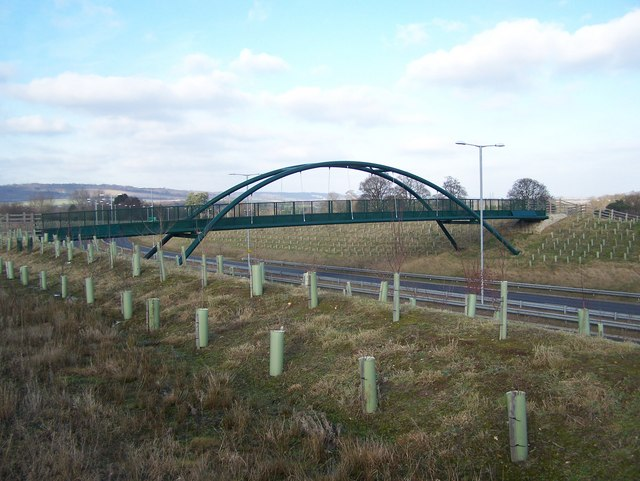
Bridleway bridge over the new Leybourne Bypass.

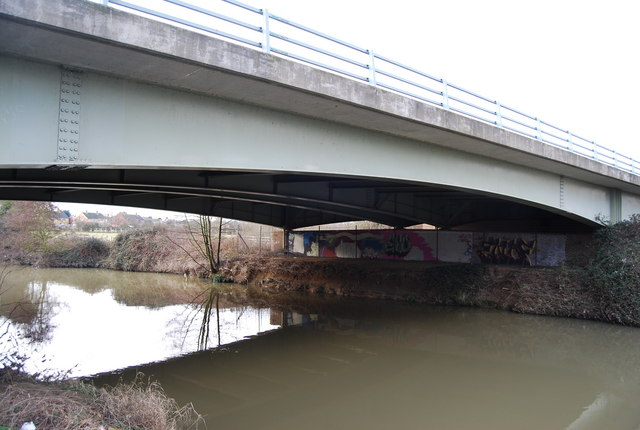
East Peckham bridge over the River Medway.

The A228 road is an important transport artery in Kent, England. It begins at the Isle of Grain and runs in a south-westerly direction to connect eventually with the A21 trunk road at Pembury. It serves existing communities and new and proposed housing developments and commercial enterprises. The most influential force on the recent upgrading of the road has been the development of Kings Hill near West Malling.

== Route ==
=== Grain to M20 ===
The A228 commences on a railway level crossing at Lower Stoke on the Isle of Grain, where it continues as the B2001. It begins as Grain Road, becoming Malmaynes Hall Road after it passes through Stoke running west. Passing High Halstow and turning south, it follows Sharnal Street which then becomes the Ratcliffe Highway, which bypasses Hoo St Werburgh and skirts the Deangate Ridge Golf Club. After reaching Chattenden it turns into Four Elms Hill before switching onto the new Wainscott Eastern Bypass. Entering Frindsbury, where the A289 Medway Towns northern bypass starts, it follows Frindsbury Hill and then Frindsbury Road before reaching Strood. The southern part of this Hoo Peninsula section was widened in 2005 as part of the Thames Gateway development programme. It is intended to dual the northern section to Grain at a later date (provisionally 2016).

In Strood the southbound and northbound routes split due to Strood's one-way system. The southbound route goes along North Street and then Knight Road before joining the Cuxton Road whilst the northbound route follows Gun Lane from Cuxton Road to Frindsbury Road. In Strood it also crosses the A2. Continuing south, the road passes over the M2 and High Speed 1 on Sundridge Hill where those two routes reach land again after crossing their respective Medway bridges.

Proceeding down Sundridge Hill, the road descends from the Downs and enters the Medway Gap at Cuxton, where it then becomes the Rochester Road and later Formby Road as it makes its way to Halling. At Halling, the A228 departs from the old route that took it through the village and proceeds along the Halling Bypass which then links up with the Snodland Bypass near Holborough.

As the Snodland Bypass ends the road rejoins its historic route (albeit on very recent much enlarged roads) for a short stretch on Malling Road which becomes Castle Way as it approaches Leybourne, meeting the M20 Junction 4.

=== M20 to Tunbridge Wells ===
South of the M20, the route again diverts onto a 2006 bypass to the west of the old route village, which then passes under the A20 (a road that it used to meet) and then joins the West Malling Bypass, which was built in 1988 then upgraded to dual carriageway in the 2000s.

Passing Manor Park Country Park to the west and the roundabout at the northern entrance to Kings Hill, the road becomes Ashton Way before meeting the Malling Road at the southern tip of West Malling and proceeding through Mereworth. South of Mereworth, the route is shared by that of the A26 for a short period before the routes diverge upon meeting Seven Mile Lane onto which the A228 turns south while the A26 proceeds southwest to Tonbridge.

As it passes East Peckham and the hamlet of Hale Street, the road becomes Hale Street before crossing the River Medway and joining Bainbridges Road, passing Beltring and The Hop Farm Country Park. Here the road splits with the B2160 branching off south towards Paddock Wood and the A228 turning southwest along the Whetsted Road towards Whetsted, where it becomes the Maidstone Road for its final stretch before reaching Pembury.

This last section is under consideration for another bypass for Colts Hill as this section of road is a relatively small single carriageway which is a notorious accident blackspot and a key link between Maidstone Hospital and the newly redeveloped Pembury Hospital.

The classification A228 was not applied originally to the route south of Mereworth. Following improvements in the 1990s (including a bypass around East Peckham), the B2016 between Mereworth and Hale Street and the B2015 between Hale Street and Pembury were both reclassified as A228.

As it passes through Pembury, the Maidstone Road becomes the Pembury Road towards Tunbridge Wells, and the A228 shares the route of the A264 for its last few yards as it crosses the A21 before finally terminating on a roundabout at the end of the slip roads for the northern bound carriageway of the A21.
