= West Malling =

Market town in Kent, England

Coordinates: 51.29170°N 0.41521°E

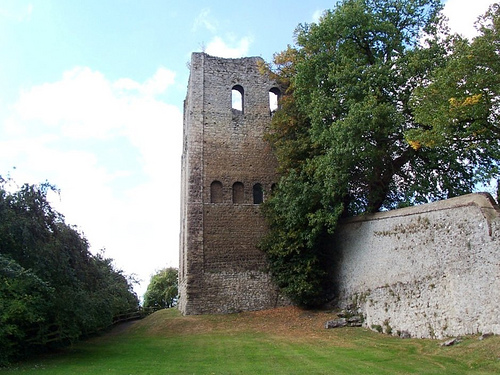
- St. Leonard's Tower, West Malling

- Location within Kent
- Population: 2,590 (2011)
- OS grid reference: TQ685575
- District: Tonbridge and Malling
- Shire county: Kent
- Region: South East
- Country: England
- Sovereign state: United Kingdom
- Post town: WEST MALLING
- Postcode district: ME19
- Dialling code: 01732
- Police: Kent
- Fire: Kent
- Ambulance: South East Coast
- UK Parliament: Maidstone and Malling

West Malling (/ˈmɔːlɪŋ/ MAW-ling, historically Town Malling) is a market town in the Tonbridge and Malling district of Kent, England. It has a population of 2,590.

The name Malling derives from the Old English meallaingas meaning 'Mealla's people'.

== Landmarks ==
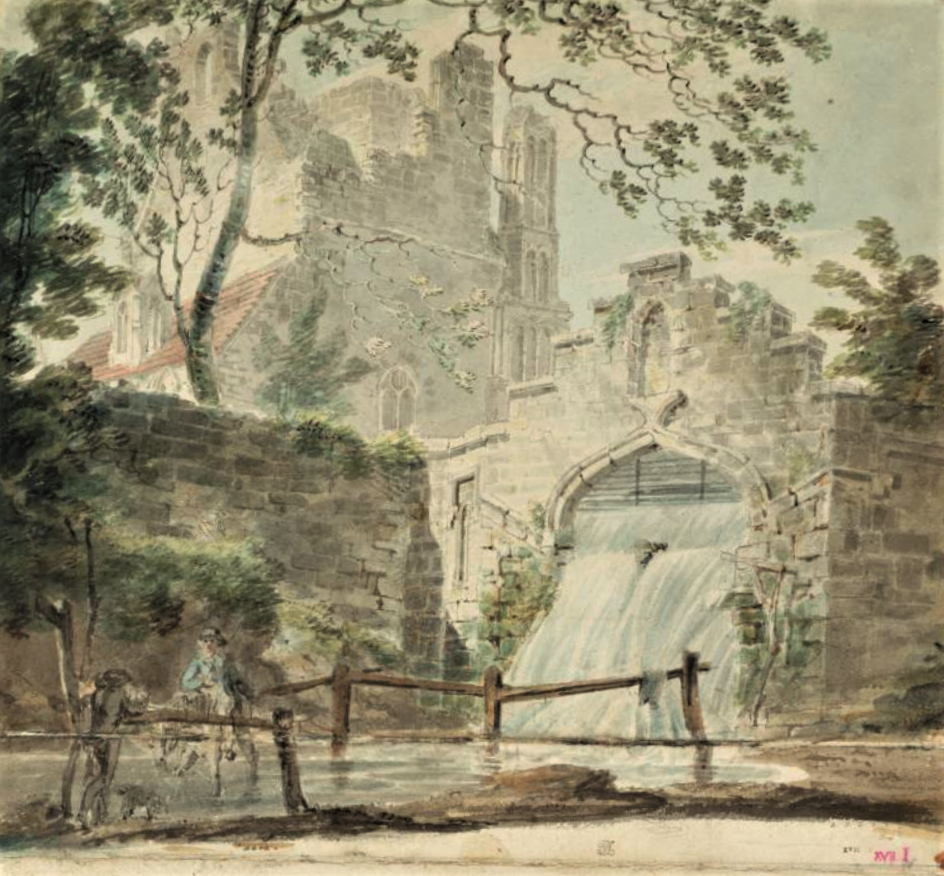
J. M. W. Turner's watercolour of St Mary's Abbey with the Cascade, circa 1791

West Malling contains several historic buildings, including St Leonard's Tower, a Norman keep built by Bishop Gundulf (bishop between 1077 and 1108). He also built the White Tower of the Tower of London, the castles of Rochester and Colchester, and the Priory and Cathedral of Rochester. In c.1090, Gundulf founded St. Mary's Abbey in West Malling for Benedictine nuns. This historic site contains significant buildings from the Norman, medieval, Tudor and Georgian eras. There is also a Grade II* listed 1966 abbey church which is used by the Anglican Benedictine nuns, who have made Malling Abbey their home since 1916.

Other buildings of interest in West Malling include the Prior's House, once a residence for those with leprosy; Ford House, over 600 years old; a mainly Georgian High Street; the Swan Hotel, an 18th-century coaching inn (Grade II listed); and Went House, built c.1720 and noted for its elegant brickwork. Manor Park Country Park is just to the south of the town, close to St Leonard's Tower and Douce's Manor, whose grounds the park once comprised.

In about 1791, the artist J. M. W. Turner painted a watercolour of 'St Mary's Abbey and an ornamental waterfall' on Swan St, that remains in place today.

Places of worship include the Anglican St Mary's Church and West Malling Baptist Church, built in 1836.

== Kings Hill ==
This new parish is a mixed residential housing estate and commercial development formed from parts of West Malling, Mereworth, East Malling and Wateringbury. The 2004 Wealth of the Nation report lists Kings Hill as having the highest average income and the highest proportion of households earning more than £100,000 per annum in Great Britain.

== Transport ==
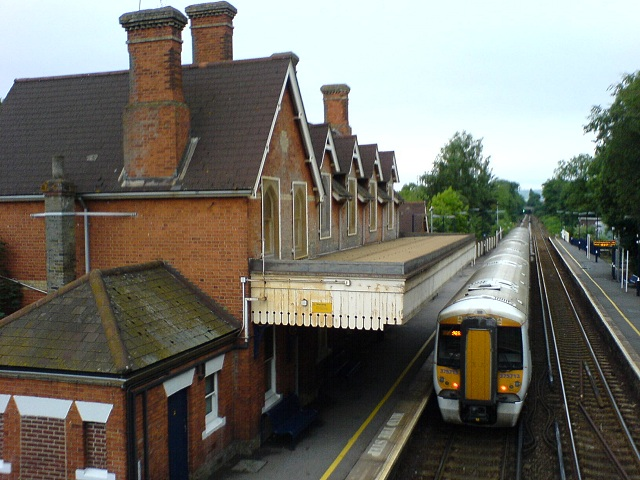
West Malling station

West Malling is some 35 miles (56 km) from central London, next to the main road between London and the coastal ferry ports of Folkestone and Dover. There are good links by road and rail; the area has become a popular commuter location.

=== Railway ===
West Malling station is a stop on the Kent Downs line, situated on the outskirts of the town. Southeastern Trains provides a regular service between London Victoria, Maidstone East and Ashford International; journeys into London take around one hour.

With the recent development of Kings Hill, the station is sometimes known as West Malling for Kings Hill; road access was provided in 2007 from the West Malling bypass, taking commuter traffic away from the High Street.

=== Road ===
The town was established originally on the main road between London and the Kent coast. West Malling is sited about 1 mile (1.6 km) from junction 4 of the M20 and from junction 2 of the M26, which leads on to the M25 London Orbital motorway.

=== Buses ===
Bus services are provided predominantly Arriva Kent and Surrey and Nu-Venture. Routes connect the town with Chatham, Maidstone, Rochester and Tunbridge Wells.

=== Air ===
In the 1930s, Maidstone Airport was established two miles from the town, at King Hill. During the Second World War, RAF fighters were posted to the then-named RAF West Malling and several US Navy squadrons were located there during the 1960s. After closure as an operational airfield in 1967, several commercial air-based activities moved onto the site and a number of popular airshows took place; the last was in 1987. By then, work had started to convert the area to non-flying use, developing into the new parish of Kings Hill.

== Healthcare ==
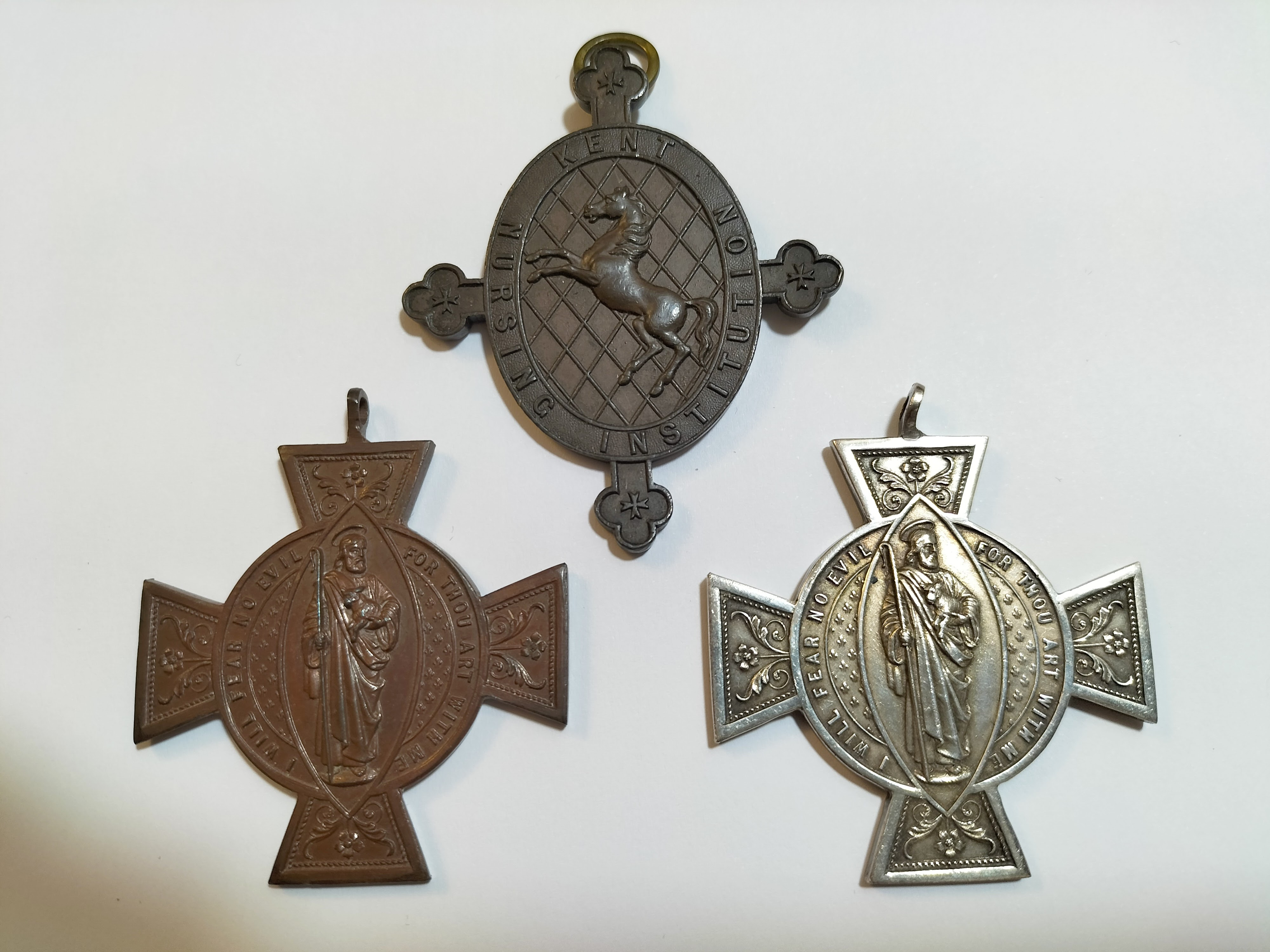
Three service awards for nurses who worked in the Kent Nursing Institute: member, five and ten year service

Kent Nursing Institute was founded in 1875 in West Malling as a private nursing service; it also had a branch in Tunbridge Wells. Funding was sourced via charitable donations, subscriptions and one-off payments. There was a nursing institute in West Malling from at least 1881 until the end of the First World War.

In 1881, Eva Luckes, Matron of The London Hospital was asked to train some probationers from the institute ward based training at The London. Nurses were awarded five (bronze) and ten (silver) badges for long service.

The Tunbridge Wells branch was in Crescent Road and was an auxiliary hospital during the First World War, with beds for civilians and soldiers.

=== Notable staff ===
- Agnes Theodosia Kelly (1863–1929) was Lady Superintendent / matron of the West Malling branch between 1902 and 1916. Kelly trained at The London Hospital under Luckes between 1889 and 1891. Kelly was also Lady Superintendent of Kent VAD Hospital 150, based in West Malling, Kent until at least January 1919.

== Local media ==
=== Newspapers ===
West Malling is covered by the Malling edition of the Kent Messenger, published by the KM Group. There is also a King's Hill edition of the Sevenoaks Chronicle.

=== Television ===
Local news and television programmes are provided by BBC South East and ITV Meridian. Television signals are received from the Bluebell Hill TV transmitter, BBC London and ITV London can also be received from the Crystal Palace TV transmitter.

=== Radio ===
The local radio station for West Malling is KMFM Maidstone. The county-wide stations BBC Radio Kent, Heart South and Gold can also be received in the town.

== Sport ==
West Malling is reputed to be the site of the first recorded cricket match in Kent. The Old County Ground, off Norman Road, was once the home of inter-county cricket in Kent; it is known that in 1705, West of Kent played Chatham at Malling.

The setting for the cricket match between All Muggleton and Dingley Dell, in Charles Dickens' The Pickwick Papers, is reputed to be based on an amalgamation of the grounds at West Malling and Maidstone. There is a resemblance to West Malling in the original illustration of the match, a version of which featured on the back of the £10 banknote featuring Dickens, first circulated on 29 April 1992. Dickens, however, was a regular visitor to Dingley Hall in the village of Dingley, Northamptonshire. Here he would have encountered an annual cricket match against a team formed of men with the name Muggleton, from the next village of Wilbaston. Dingley Dell is an area just south of the village, steep and wooded which may instead have been the model for Dickens' "Dingley Dell".

King's Hill golf course was founded in 1995 and is open to guests and visitors.

== Cultural references ==
In 1967, The Beatles' Magical Mystery Tour was filmed around West Malling, including in the High Street and at the airfield.

== Notable residents ==
- Aretas Akers-Douglas, 1st Viscount Chilston, Conservative politician and Home Secretary 1902–1905. Born at St. Mary's Abbey, West Malling in 1851.
- John Downman, artist. Lived in Went House, West Malling from 1804.
- Wing Commander Guy Gibson, Victoria Cross recipient and leader of The Dambusters, was stationed at RAF West Malling in 1941. His signature is preserved on the ceiling of the cellar at Douce's Manor, used as an Officers' Mess by the Airmen.
- Tony Hudgell, fundraiser, lives with his adoptive parents in Kings Hill.
- William Perfect, surgeon, obstetrician and pioneer of the treatment of mental illness. Lived in West Malling from 1756 until his death in 1809.
- Lt. Col. A.D. Wintle, famous eccentric and soldier. First layman to win a unanimous verdict in the House of Lords. Lived in Coldharbour House in West Malling.
- Gladys Wright, an advocate for women's physical education was born here in 1891.
