= Gladys Wright =

English promoter of women's physical education

- Born: 8 July 1891; West Malling
- Died: 19 June 1980 (aged 88); Kent
- Known for: women's physical education

Gladys Frances Miriam Wright (8 July 1891 – 19 June 1980) was an English promoter of women's physical education.

== Life ==
Wright was born in West Malling in 1891. Her mother was Clara Frances (born Hunter) and her father, Edward Henry Wright, was a master grocer. She was the second of their five children.

In 1918 she and sixteen men set out to swim the ten miles between Aylesford and Rochester. Wright won the race by thirty minutes with only two other competitors completing the course.

In 1923 she started the English Scandinavian Summer School which was at Herne Bay in Kent.

The Scandinavian gymnastic tour of Great Britain of 1933 was her creation. The show travelled to major cities in England and Scotland. As a result, she was awarded the Swedish Gymnastic Association's silver medal and the President of Finland gave her a medal from the Order of the White Rose of Finland for her contribution to improving relations between Britain and Finland.

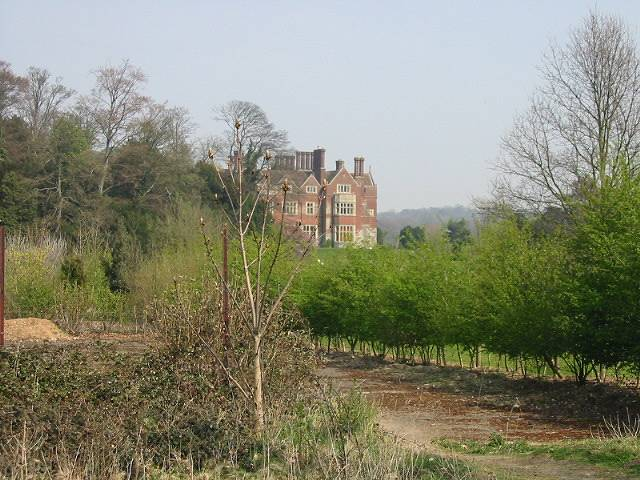
View of St Alban's Court which housed her Nonington College

In 1938 she founded and became the first principal of the Nonington College of Physical Education. The college was based at St Alban's Court in Nonington which was a recent acquisition by the English Gymnastics Association. The facilities included running tracks, an Olympic standard swimming pool and a gymnasium furnished with equipment imported from Scandinavia.

== Death and legacy ==
Wright died in a nursing home in Hardres Court, near Canterbury, Kent. She had raised the profile of PE and she had created lots of Britain's gym teachers. Their (and her) efforts were recognised by the University of London in 2023. The university awarded honorary degrees to the surviving teachers who had completed the course at Nonington.
