= Kings Hill =

Civil parish in Kent, England

Coordinates: 51.273°N 0.400°E

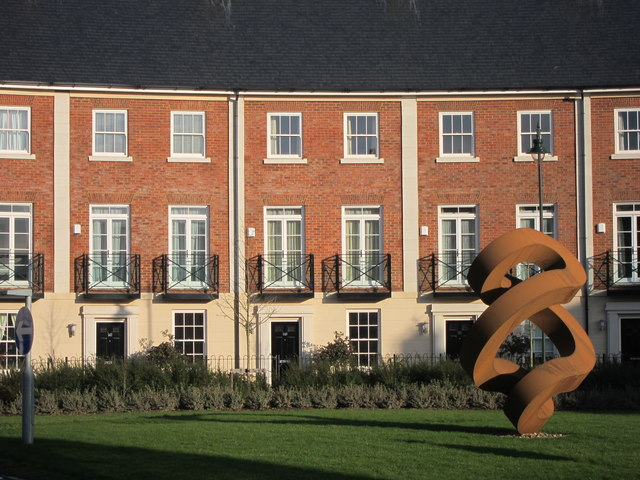
- The Crescent

- Location within Kent
- Population: 7,770 (2011 census)
- OS grid reference: TQ591468
- Civil parish: Kings Hill
- District: Tonbridge and Malling
- Shire county: Kent
- Region: South East
- Country: England
- Sovereign state: United Kingdom
- Post town: West Malling
- Postcode district: ME19
- Dialling code: 01732
- Police: Kent
- Fire: Kent
- Ambulance: South East Coast
- UK Parliament: Maidstone and Malling

Kings Hill is a civil parish in the borough of Tonbridge and Malling in Kent, England. It is one of several new villages built in Kent since the 1950s (other examples including Vigo and New Ash Green). Development started in 1989 near West Malling, on land previously occupied by RAF West Malling which was operational during both world wars. The plan was for a multi-purpose site of both residential and office/business space.

Parts of the 2007 Channel 4 drama series Cape Wrath were shot in the village.

== Development ==
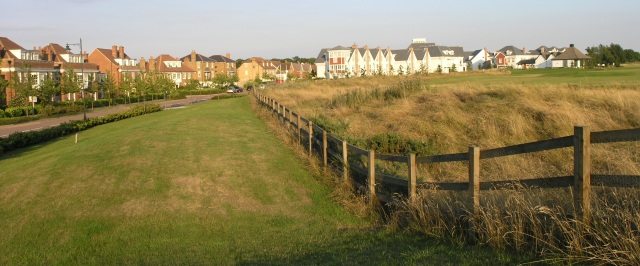
Kings Hill estate bordering Kings Hill golf course

Liberty Property Trust carried out the principal development of the site, commencing on the old West Malling airfield site in 1989. The ultimate aim is to have some 2,750 homes and 2 million square feet (186,000 m^{2}) of commercial properties. As of 2010, 2000 homes had been built along with 800,000 square feet (74,000 m^{2}) of business space. The development precipitated a major expansion of the A228 which passes the village.

The oldest parts of Kings Hill are around Worcester Avenue and Discovery Drive. Phase 2 is around Beacon Avenue to the north and there is also a Phase 3.

Construction of houses and other buildings is set to continue in Kings Hill as Kent County Council have purchased new land for building. In May 2010 plans were unveiled for the re-development of the old airfield's derelict control tower (now a listed building) and the surrounding area.

Many of the roads in Kings Hill are named after varieties of apple, a fruit which has been grown in Kent for centuries, including Bovarde Avenue, Braeburn Way, Discovery Drive, Melrose Avenue, Pippin Way, Winston Avenue and Worcester Avenue. Others pay homage to the site's past use as an RAF WWII aerodrome, with names such as Typhoon Road, Mosquito Road, Hurricane Road, Spitfire Road, Beaufighter Road, Javelin Road, Lancaster Way, Lysander Road, Meteor Road and Mustang Road.

=== Community facilities ===
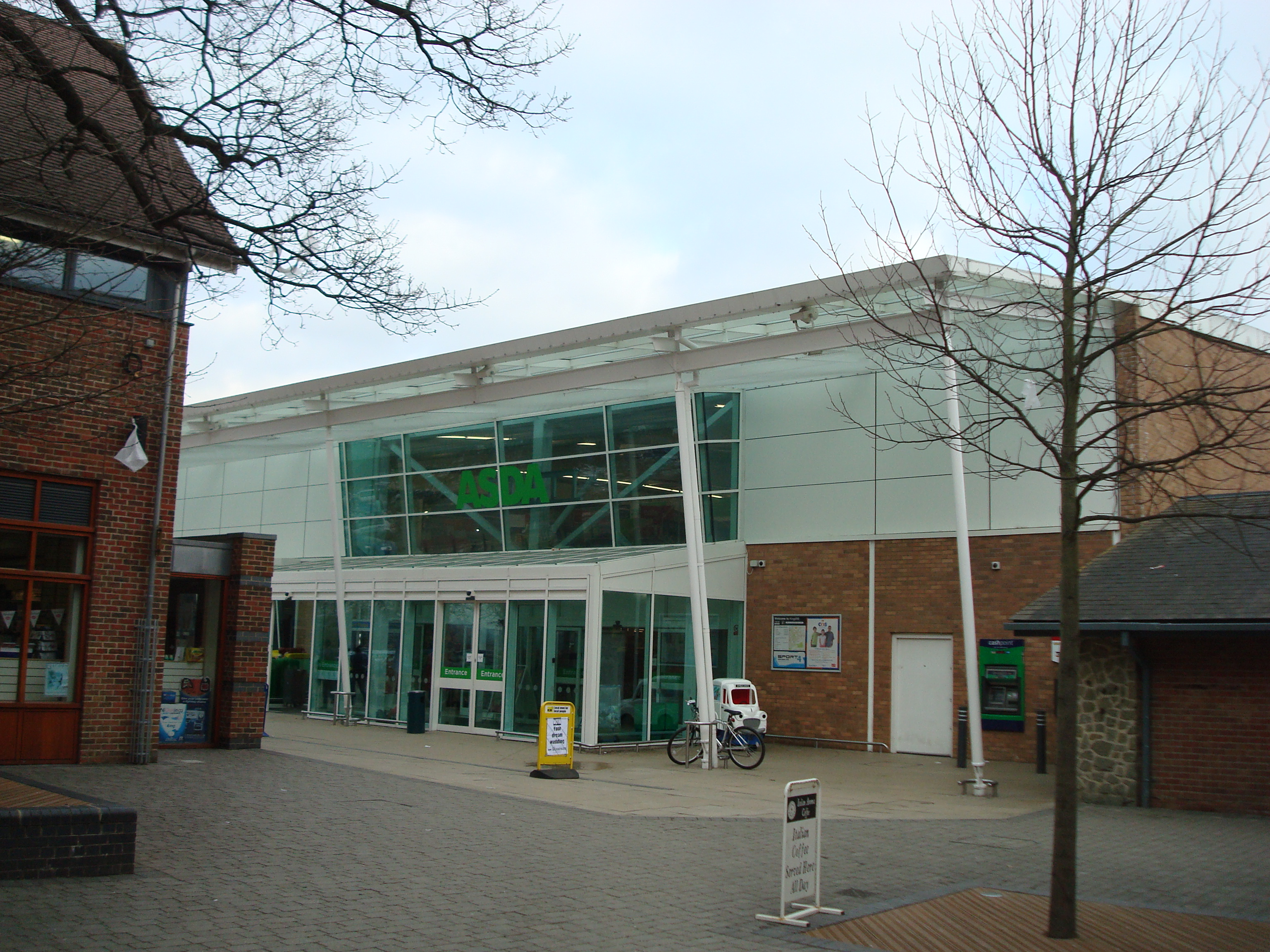
Asda supermarket in Kings Hill

There are three primary schools in the estate (Kings Hill Primary, the Discovery School and Valley Invicta).

Other facilities include Kings Hill Sports Park, an Asda superstore, a Little Waitrose, an Aldi, a Shepherd Neame pub named The Spitfire, a doctor's surgery, a veterinary surgery, opticians, pharmacist, traditional and eastern restaurants, takeaways, cafes, two churches and a David Lloyd Leisure health club.

Kings Hill is served by St Gabriel's Church of England church, which currently meets in the Discovery School. Kings Hill falls predominantly within the ecclesiastical parishes of Mereworth and West Malling. In 2003 the Diocese of Rochester appointed the first full-time resident minister to meet the pastoral needs of the growing business and residential community. In 2015 they appointed their second full-time minister.

=== Public art ===
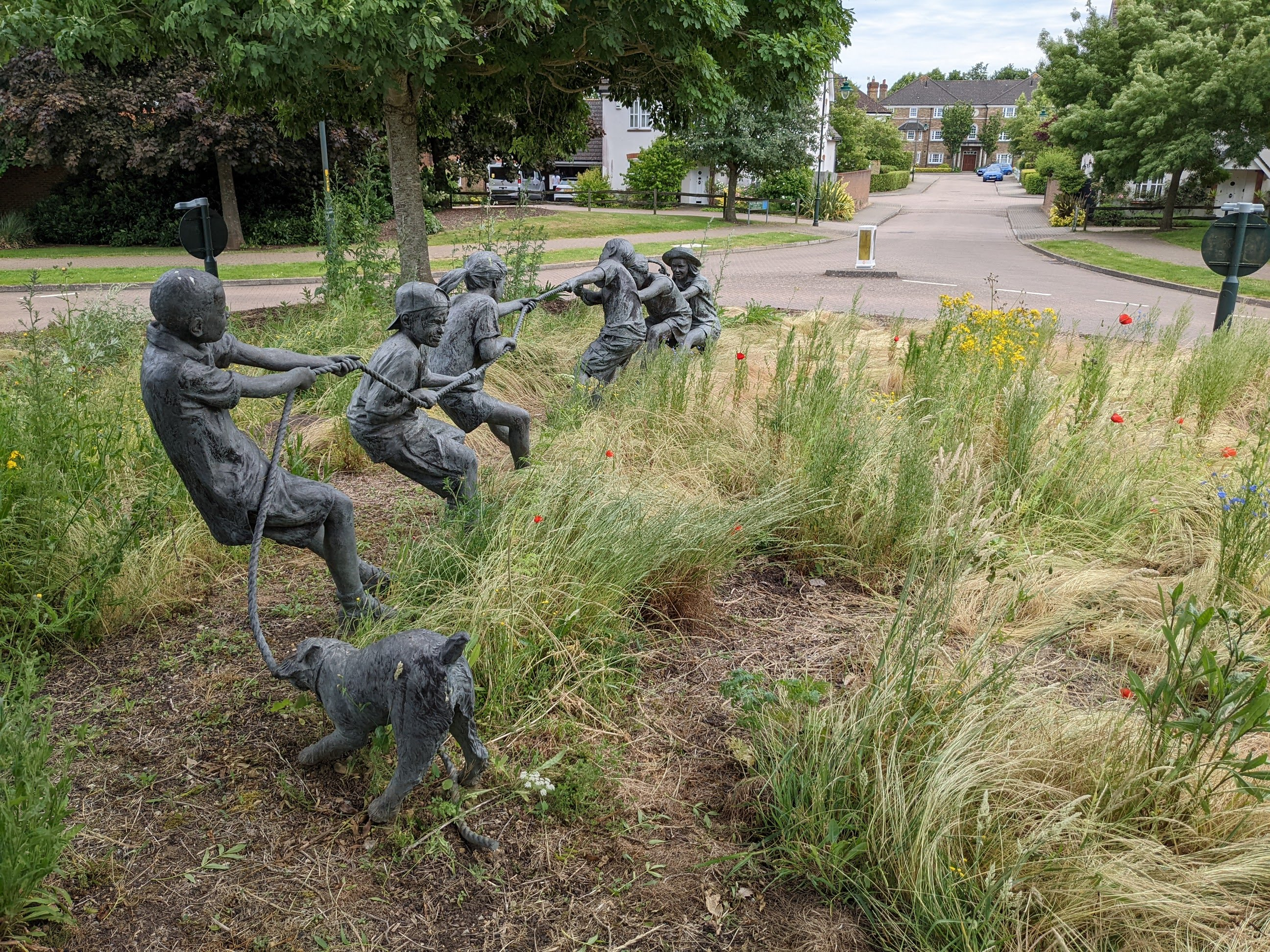
The 'tug of war' roundabout on Discovery Drive in Kings Hill.

The development features a number of major sculptures commissioned by the developers. On the roundabout between the business park and the residential area is A different ball game by Kevin Atherton which consists of a 10 ft (3.0 m) diameter reflective ball being pushed in different directions by three life-size bronze figures which were cast from local people. On the A228 roundabout to the north of the business park is a 45 ft (14 m) tall obelisk style sculpture called L'Ambiente created by Enzo Torcoletti. Smaller sculptures on the site include a statue depiction of a tug of war game on the roundabout near to Kings Hill Primary and memorials to Group Captain Peter Townsend and Bill Rouse, late chairman of the site's developers.

== Transport ==
Kings Hill has bus links to Maidstone, Tonbridge, Tunbridge Wells and Chatham, and most services are run by Arriva Southern Counties. From West Malling railway station there are trains to London, Maidstone and Ashford. There are further footpath and bridleway links to Wateringbury and East Malling.

== Businesses ==
A number of major organisations have offices in Kings Hill's business park including:

- Balfour Beatty
- Capita IT Services
- Charities Aid Foundation
- FLIR Systems
- Jupiter Fund Management
- Kent County Council
- Kimberly-Clark (UK headquarters)
- Rolex
- Tonbridge and Malling Borough Council (housed in the Officer's Mess)
- Watchfinder
- Yell Group

== Demography ==
Demographic comparison in 2011
Statistic	Kings Hill	Tonbridge and Malling borough	England
Population	7,770	120,805	53,012,456
Foreign born	9.2%	6.9%	13.8%
White	93.4%	95.9%	85.5%
Asian	3.3%	1.9%	7.7%
Black	0.6%	0.3%	3.4%
Christian	62.7%	63.7%	59.4%
Muslim	0.9%	0.6%	5.0%
Hindu	0.7%	0.4%	1.5%
No religion	28.7%	27.3%	24.7%
Unemployed	2.5%	3.0%	4.4%
Retired	8.7%	14.5%	13.7%

The 2004 Wealth of the Nation report listed the Kings Hill postcode sector (ME19 4), as having the highest average income and the highest proportion of households earning greater than £100,000 per annum in Great Britain, although the postcode did not appear in the 2006 report.

At the 2011 UK census the Kings Hill electoral ward had a population of 7,770, an increase of 157% from that in 2001. The ethnicity was 93.4% white, 2.1% mixed race, 3.3% Asian, 0.6% black and 0.6% other. The place of birth of residents was 90.8% United Kingdom, 0.5% Republic of Ireland, 1.5% other Western European countries, and 7.2% elsewhere. Religion was recorded as 62.7% Christian, 0.9% Muslim, 0.4% Buddhist, 0.7% Hindu, 0.2% Sikh and 0.1% Jewish. 28.7% were recorded as having no religion while 6.0% did not state their religion.

The economic activity of residents aged 16–74 was 47.6% in full-time employment, 14.6% in part-time employment, 11.9% self-employed, 2.5% unemployed, 2.6% students with jobs, 3.4% students without jobs, 8.7% retired, 6.5% looking after home or family, 1.3% permanently sick or disabled and 0.9% economically inactive for other reasons. Primary industries of employment of residents were retail and motor trade 14.7%, finance and insurance 14.7% construction 11.7%, scientific and technical 9.5% and manufacturing 8.7%. Compared with national figures, the ward had a relatively high proportion of workers in finance and real estate. There were a relatively low proportion in agriculture, education, construction, hotels and restaurants. Of the ward's residents aged 16–74, 36.8% had a higher education qualification or the equivalent, compared with 27.4% nationwide.

== Sports and recreation ==
Kings Hill Cricket Club was established in 2006 to make use of the new cricket pitch opposite the Discovery School. The club played its inaugural match against Town Malling Cricket Club in September 2006 at the historic Old County Ground, West Malling. In January 2008 the club adopted the de Havilland Mosquito aircraft as its badge in memory of the role West Malling airfield played during the Second World War as a night fighter station. The Kings Hill Ground hosted its first game, again versus Town Malling on 17 July 2010, with former English international cricketer Derek Underwood on hand to perform the opening ceremony. The junior development program did start to grow. Gaining A star cricket coaching programme.

Kings Hill Football Club (KHFC) was established in 2003 to provide football for the increasing numbers of children within Kings Hill. The club has over 400 players across 32 teams of all ages from children to veterans and includes female teams. The junior and youth sections of the club feature 2 or 3 teams in each age group (Elite, Colts and Development teams) to provide the appropriate level of football for their players. The men's 1st team (established for the 2014/15 season) plays in the Kent County League; its mascot is young disabled fundraiser Tony Hudgell. The men's reserves team plays in the Maidstone & District Football League. For the 2014/15 season the club has introduced a girls Player development Centre (PDC) with the aim of providing quality coaching to girls from Kings Hill and beyond. The club now hosts "Walking Football" which allows less mobile players to continue enjoying the game. In September 2013 the club moved to a new home ground, Kings Hill Sports Park, a facility run and maintained by Kings Hill Parish Council. The park features five professionally laid, high-quality grass football pitches, a floodlit full-size Artificial turf pitch (which also hosts rugby training), and a pavilion with eight changing rooms, bar and social area. As of September 2014 76% of KHFC players reside in Kings Hill.

Kings Hill also has a golf club, founded in 1995, with a course designed by David Williams. Nearby Manor Park Country Park provides more open space and walking trails.

Kings Hill Wheelers cycling club, founded 2015. Mixed ability cycling club, social rides up to sportive distances. Meeting point at Waitrose car park two to four times a week.

== See also ==
- Listed buildings in Kings Hill
- West Malling
