= Tonbridge and Malling =

Coordinates: 51.283°N 0.350°E

- Borough and non-metropolitan district
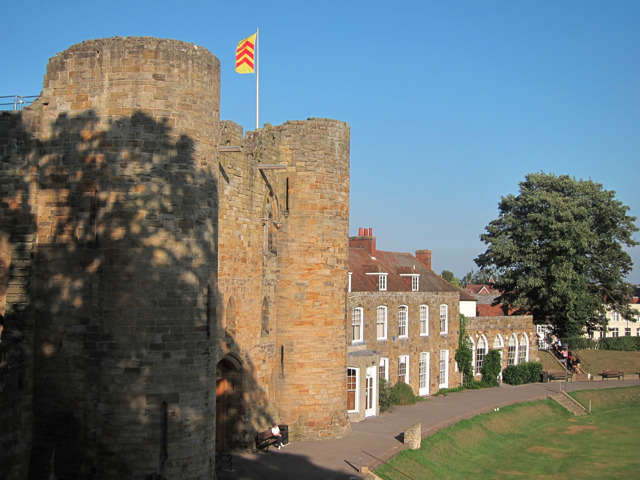
- Tonbridge Castle

- Tonbridge and Malling shown within Kent
- Sovereign state: United Kingdom
- Constituent country: England
- Region: South East England
- Non-metropolitan county: Kent
- Status: Non-metropolitan district
- Admin HQ: West Malling
- Incorporated: 1 April 1974

Government
  - Type: Non-metropolitan district council
  - Body: Tonbridge and Malling Borough Council
  - MPs: Tris Osborne; Tom Tugendhat

Area
  - Total: 92.71 sq mi (240.13 km^{2})
  - Rank: 136th (of 296)

Population (2024)
  - Total: 136,853
  - Rank: 180th (of 296)
  - Density: 1,476.1/sq mi (569.91/km^{2})

Ethnicity (2021)
  - Ethnic groups: List: 93.3% White; 2.9% Asian; 2.2% Mixed; 1% Black; 0.6% other

Religion (2021)
  - Religion: List: 48.7% Christianity; 42.8% no religion; 5.6% not stated; 1% Islam; 0.9% Hinduism; 0.4% other; 0.3% Buddhism; 0.2% Sikhism; 0.1% Judaism
- Time zone: UTC0 (GMT)
  - Summer (DST): UTC+1 (BST)
- ONS code: 29UP (ONS); E07000115 (GSS)
- OS grid reference: TQ6386756441

Tonbridge and Malling is a local government district with borough status in Kent, England. The council is based at Kings Hill. The borough also includes the towns of Tonbridge and Snodland along with numerous villages including Aylesford, West Malling and surrounding rural areas.

The neighbouring districts are Maidstone, Tunbridge Wells, Sevenoaks, Gravesham and Medway.

Under current local government reorganisation plans, all district councils in Kent, as well as the county council, will be abolished in 2028, with the district becoming part of a new West Kent unitary authority.

== Geography ==
Tonbridge and Malling Borough covers an area from the North Downs at Burham and Snodland in the north to the town of Tonbridge in the south. The River Medway meanders north-east through the borough towards the Medway Gap, having in the west of the area received the River Eden. The Eden Valley Walk is also mostly in this borough.

== History ==
=== Ancient times ===
The area has been occupied for thousands of years. The Neolithic people left behind much evidence: megaliths such as Kit's Coty House at Aylesford and the Coldrum Stones at Trottiscliffe; and the Long barrows at Addington being examples. Bronze and Iron Age finds are also plentiful. There is evidence of the Romano-British civilisation along the Medway Valley.

The immediate district of Tonbridge is omitted from the Domesday Book; however most other settlements in the Borough are included. Castles were built at Tonbridge, Allington and West Malling in the 13th century. Religious houses: Malling, Aylesford and Tonbridge were built: one such was St Mary's Abbey dating from 1092. Aylesford Priory on the banks of the Medway, was built in the 13th century.

There are surviving medieval manor houses including Ightham Mote and Old Soar Manor.

=== 19th century onwards ===
==== Description ====
Tonbridge district can be divided in two distinct areas, which were divided at the beginning of the nineteenth century by the woods and heaths of the ragstone (1) ridge from Great Comp to East Malling. Northwards lies the well peopled Vale of Holmesdale with the market town of West Malling as the principal centre of population, an area crossed lengthways by the railway and motorway (M20); southwards of the ridge is the heavy clay of the Weald and valley of the Medway

Kentish ragstone geologically speaking is the Upper Greensand Ridge, used in church building in Kent.

=== Modern times ===
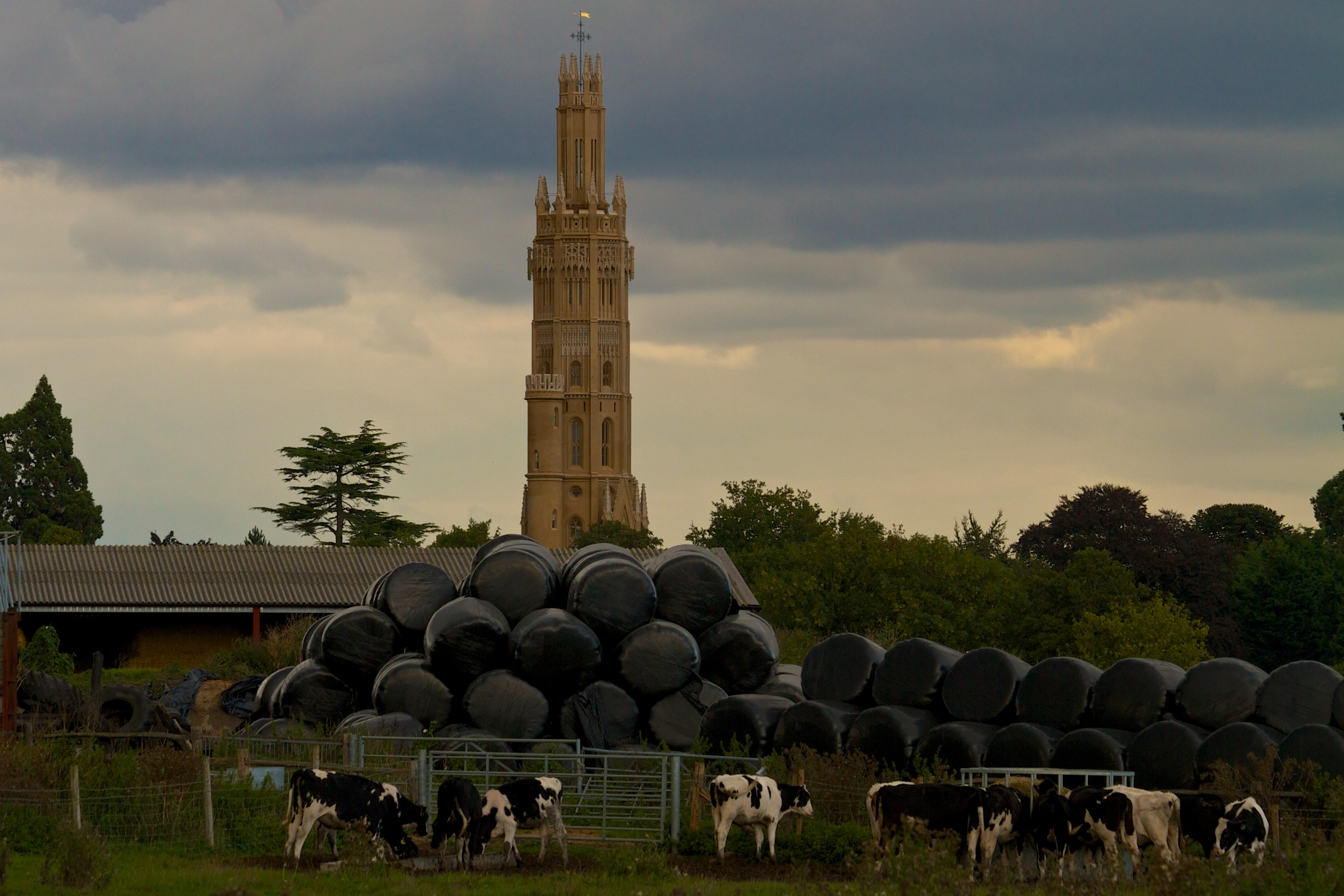
Hadlow Tower is in Tonbridge and Malling Borough

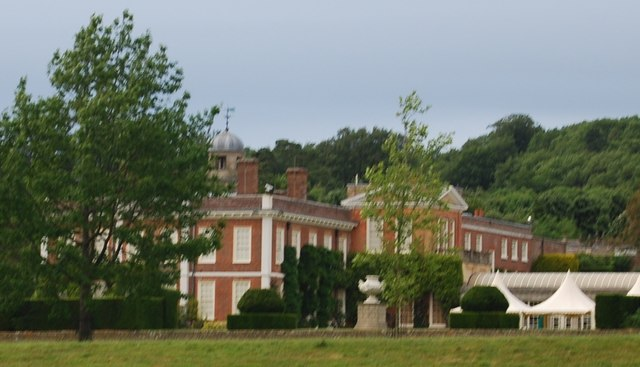
Fairlawne House is in this borough

The land included is mainly agricultural – orchards, and livestock in the main – although major business parks and buildings within 30 miles (50 km) coupled with the railways and the motorway means a majority of working residents commute to work in the more built-up villages and Tonbridge. The new settlement of Kings Hill can be regarded as tied in with the economy of Maidstone equally with that of parts of Kent further to the western extremity.

A remnant of the once flourishing hop-growing industry is provided by a tourist attraction at Beltring: once the Whitbread Hop Farm, it puts on weekend exhibitions and shows. Tonbridge and Malling has 27 listed buildings in the highest category of the national system, Grade I. This includes eight churches, five reduced structures left over from St Mary's Abbey or Malling Abbey, West Malling and four manor houses, mostly built by lower social ranks than the titled nobility.

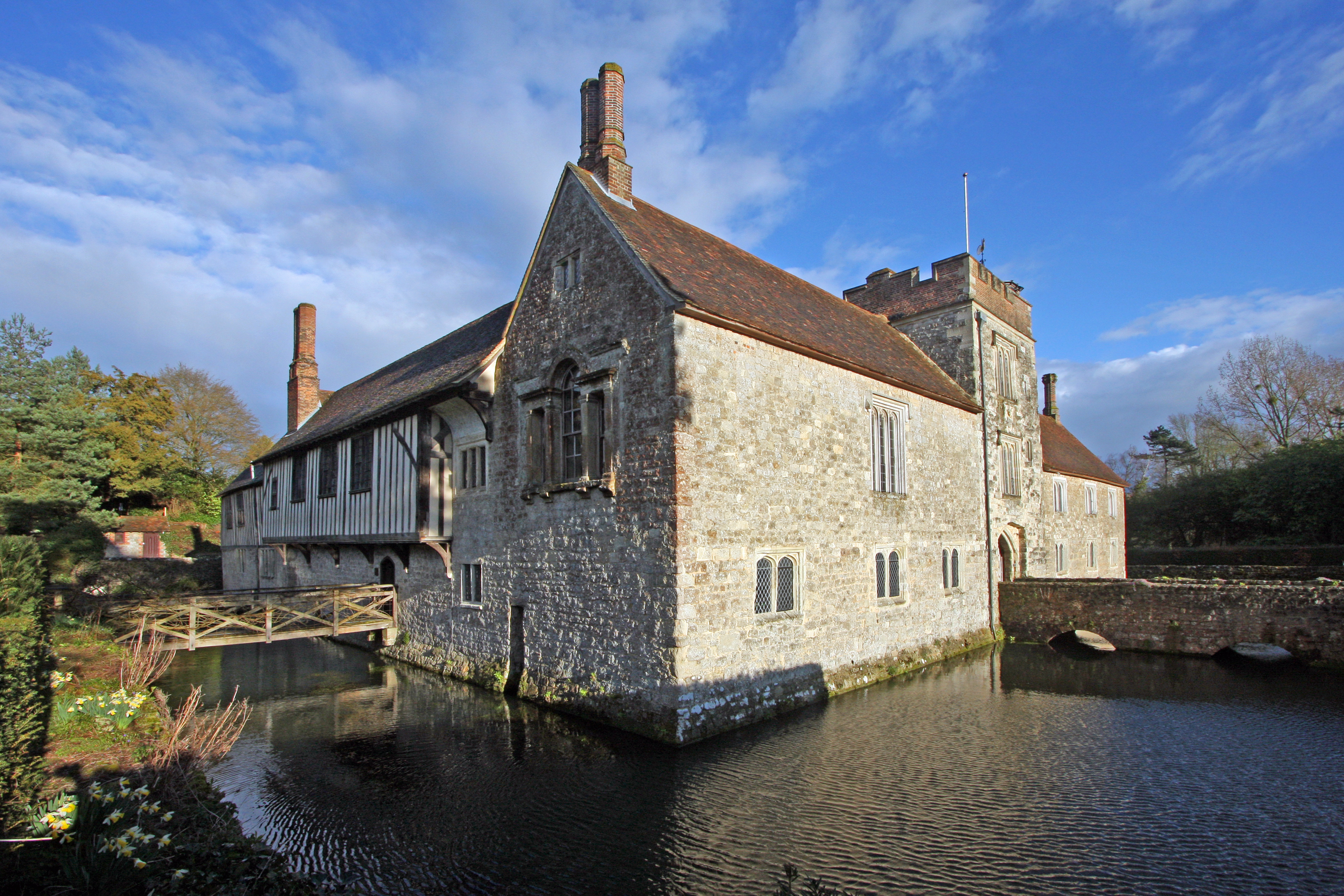
Ightham Mote is in Tonbridge and Malling

A diverse materials and appearance construction is Ightham Mote which is recognised in the highest category of the UK's architecture listing system, Grade I, though no longer in private hands. East Malling Research Station disseminates results of research into matters affecting horticultural crops, with particular emphasis on the fruit, hop and nursery stock industries.

Many of the villages are beside long-distance walks with tourist accommodation, enabling tours of the orchards and bluebell woods.

=== Administrative history ===
The district was created on 1 April 1974 under the Local Government Act 1972. It covered the whole area of two former districts and part of a third, all of which were abolished at the same time:

- Malling Rural District
- Tonbridge Rural District (parishes of Hadlow and Hildenborough only, rest went to Tunbridge Wells)
- Tonbridge Urban District

The new district was named Tonbridge and Malling, combining the names of the former districts.

The district received borough status on 16 December 1983, changing the name of the council from Tonbridge and Malling District Council to Tonbridge and Malling Borough Council and allowing the chair of the council to take the title of mayor.

== Governance ==
Tonbridge and Malling Borough Council

Type
- Type: Non-metropolitan district

Leadership
- Mayor: Kim Tanner, Conservative since 12 May 2026
- Leader: Matt Boughton, Conservative since 13 July 2021
- Chief Executive: Damian Roberts since 2024

Structure
- Seats: 44 councillors
- Political groups: Administration (23) Conservatives (21) Independent Alliance (2) Other parties (21) Liberal Democrats (11) Green (8) Labour (2)

Elections
- Last election: 4 May 2023

Meeting place
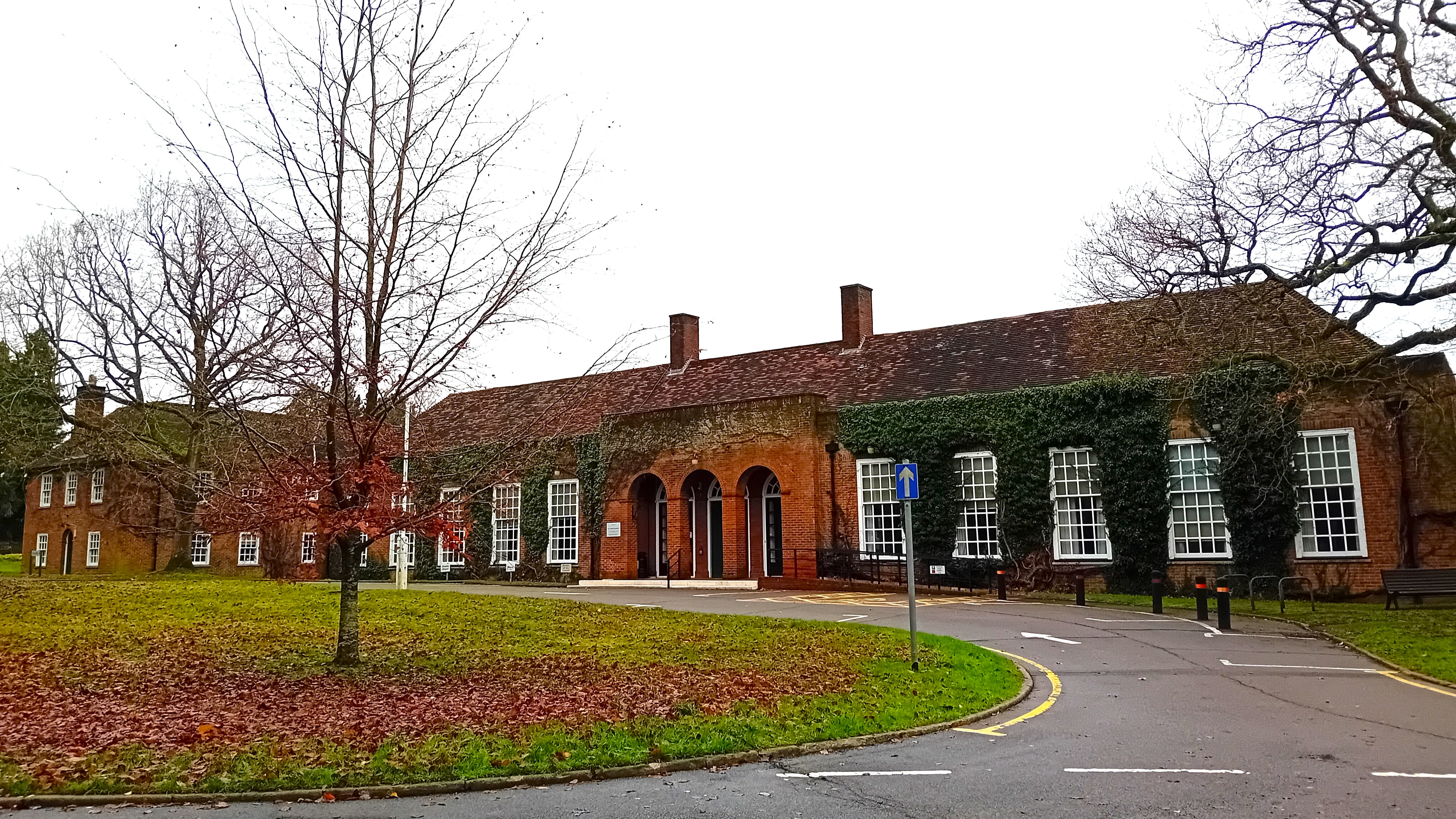
- Gibson Building, Gibson Drive, Kings Hill, West Malling, ME19 4LZ

Website
- www.tmbc.gov.uk

Tonbridge and Malling Borough Council provides district-level services. County-level services are provided by Kent County Council. Much of the borough is also covered by civil parishes, which form a third tier of local government.

=== Political control ===
Since the 2023 election the council has been under no overall control, being led by a coalition of the Conservatives and the Independent Alliance.

The first election to the council was held in 1973, initially operating as a shadow authority alongside the outgoing authorities until the new arrangements came into effect on 1 April 1974. Political control of the council since 1974 has been as follows:

| Party in control | Years |
|---|---|
| Conservative | 1974–1995 |
| No overall control | 1995–2003 |
| Conservative | 2003–2023 |
| No overall control | 2023–present |

=== Leadership ===
The role of mayor is largely ceremonial in Tonbridge and Malling. Political leadership is instead provided by the leader of the council. The leaders since 1985 have been:

| Councillor | Party | From | To |
|---|---|---|---|
| Mark Worrall | Conservative | 1985 | 1995 |
| David Thornewell | Liberal Democrats | 1995 | 2003 |
| Mark Worrall | Conservative | 2003 | 26 Apr 2012 |
| Nicolas Heslop | Conservative | 30 May 2012 | 13 Jul 2021 |
| Matt Boughton | Conservative | 13 Jul 2021 | |

=== Composition ===
Following the 2023 election and subsequent by-elections up to May 2025, the composition of the council was:

| Party | Councillors |
|---|---|
| Conservative | 21 |
| Liberal Democrats | 11 |
| Green | 8 |
| Labour | 2 |
| Independent Alliance | 2 |
| Total | 44 |

=== Premises ===
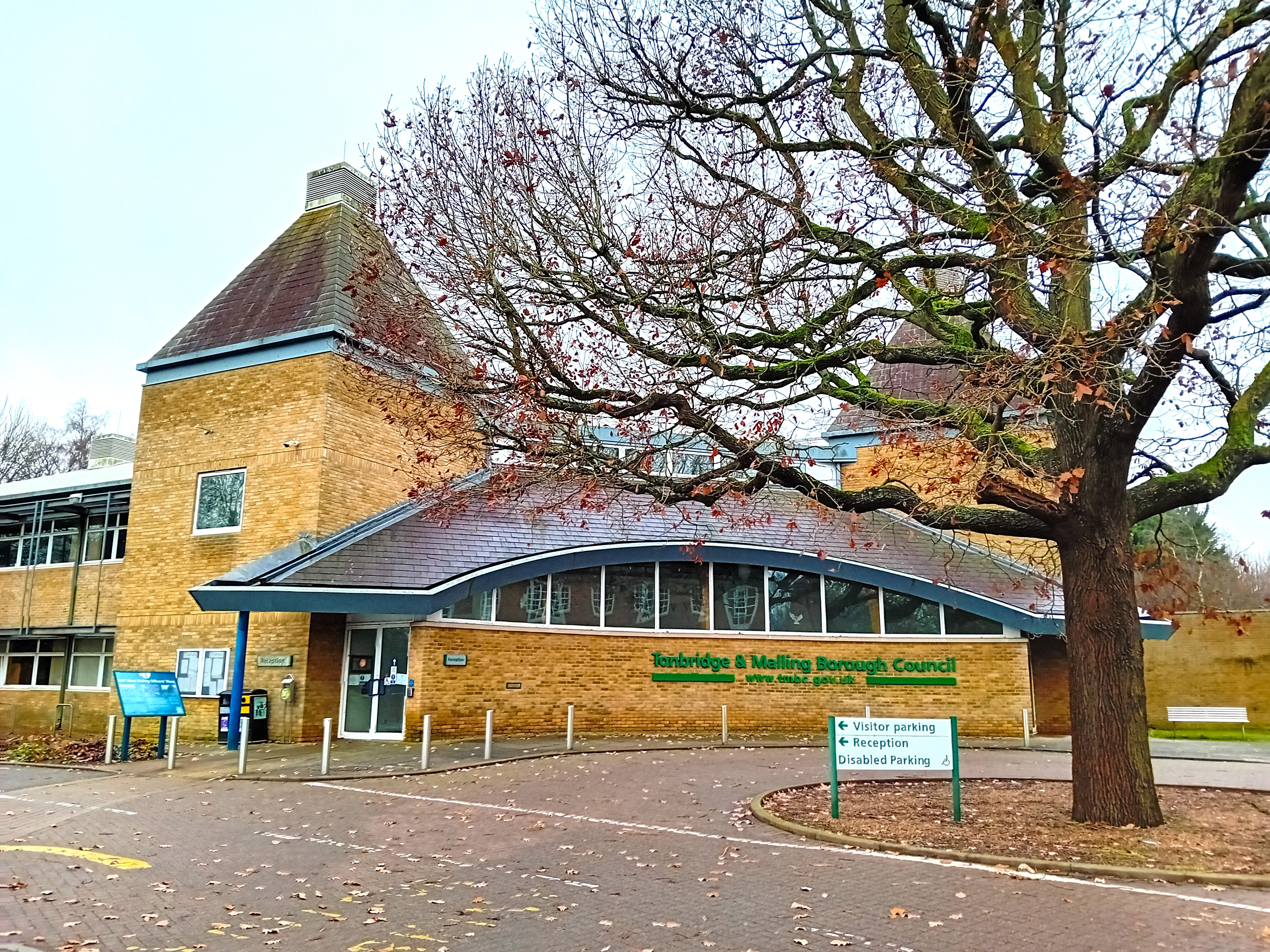
Extension to the Gibson Building including the main reception, completed 2000.

Tonbridge and Malling Borough Council's main offices are at the Gibson Building in Kings Hill, which had been built in 1939 as the officers' mess building of RAF West Malling. The building is named after Wing Commander Guy Gibson, known for leading the Dambusters Raid, who had been based at RAF West Malling in 1941–1942. The council moved to the Gibson Building in November 1974, just a few months after the council's creation. A large extension to the Gibson Building was added in 2000. The council also has an office at Tonbridge Castle, which had been the offices of the former Tonbridge Urban District Council.

== Elections ==
Since the last boundary changes in 2023, the council has comprised 44 councillors elected from 19 wards, with each ward electing one, two or three councillors. Elections are held every four years.

=== Wider politics ===
In Parliament, the borough is covered by the Tonbridge, Maidstone and Malling and Chatham and Aylesford constituencies.

== Parishes ==
Much of the district is covered by civil parishes, with the exception being the former Tonbridge Urban District, covering the town of Tonbridge, which is an unparished area. The parish council for Snodland takes the style "town council".

- Addington
- Aylesford
- Birling
- Borough Green
- Burham
- Ditton
- East Malling and Larkfield
- East Peckham
- Hadlow
- Hildenborough
- Ightham
- Kings Hill
- Leybourne
- Mereworth
- Offham
- Platt
- Plaxtol
- Ryarsh
- Shipbourne
- Snodland (town)
- Stansted
- Trottiscliffe
- Wateringbury
- West Malling
- West Peckham
- Wouldham
- Wrotham

== Transport ==
Six railway routes operate through the borough.

The South Eastern Main Line on the route London – Tonbridge – Ashford International – Dover crosses the west of the borough with stations at Hildenborough and Tonbridge.

The Maidstone East Line on the route Victoria – Maidstone East – Ashford International – Canterbury – Thanet with its stations at Borough Green & Wrotham, West Malling for Kings Hill, East Malling and Barming crosses the north of the borough.

From Tonbridge, the Hastings line services run to Tunbridge Wells and Hastings, with some through services from Hastings to London, and the Redhill to Tonbridge Line services run to Redhill: through services on that line to Guildford have been discontinued.

The High Speed 1 line with Eurostar services crosses the north of the borough, but there are no stations here, although southeastern high speed commuter services to / from London St Pancras call at Snodland during the morning and evening peak periods.

The Medway Valley Line links the North Kent Line at Strood with the South Eastern Main Line at Paddock Wood railway station. Stations are at Snodland, New Hythe, and Aylesford on the Strood – Maidstone West section of the line in the north of the borough and Wateringbury on the Maidstone West – Paddock Wood section of the line in the south of the borough. Beltring and Brandbridges Halt is close to the borough boundary. Trains on this line now run through from Paddock Wood to Tonbridge, but through services from Maidstone West via Strood to London Bridge have been discontinued.

The borough has road routes passing through it. There are three motorways: the M2, M20 and the M26; three west-east roads (A20; A21 and the A26 road). Three other roads of similar stature are the A227, A228 and A229.

In addition there are long distance footpaths, among them the Greensand Way, the Medway Valley Walk, the Wealdway and the Eden Valley Walk.

== Media ==
In terms of television, the area is served by BBC South East and ITV Meridian. Television signals are received from the Tunbridge Wells and Bluebell Hill TV transmitters, BBC London and ITV London can also be received from the Crystal Palace TV transmitters.

Radio stations for the area are:

- BBC Radio Kent
- Heart South
- KMFM West Kent (covering Tonbridge)
- KMFM Maidstone (covering West Malling)

Local newspapers are Kent and Sussex Courier and Kent Messenger, which is published by the KM Group.

== Youth radio station ==
Tonbridge and Malling has youth projects and organisations including Cupid FM, the first ever youth radio station or project of its kind within the area. The project received funding and support from Kent County Council and Tonbridge & Malling Borough Council, and during 2006 set up a studio and online broadcast which came to a close in November of that year. The station was run by local teens and music was populated by the latest chart hits.

== Mayors and chairmen ==
The councillor presiding at council meetings was initially called the chairman until December 1983 when the council was awarded borough status and the role was renamed mayor. The existing chairman at that point, Barry Hughes, became the first mayor.

- 1974–75 John Burt
- 1975–76 Michael Stone
- 1976–77 Jean Marwood
- 1977–78 Peter Adcock
- 1978–79 David Davis
- 1979–80 Peter Foy
- 1980–81 John Saunders
- 1981–82 John Adams
- 1982–83 Arnold Jones
- 1983–84 Barry Hughes
- 1984–85 Janice Browne
- 1985–86 Maurice Ferry
- 1986–87 Robert Allen
- 1987–88 Jill Hutchinson
- 1988–89 Godfrey Horne
- 1989–90 Billie Sinclair-Lee
- 1990–91 Mike Dobson
- 1991–92 Roy Barnes
- 1992–93 Derek Chandler
- 1993–94 Marion Cole
- 1994–95 Terence Barton
- 1995–96 Patricia Barnes
- 1996–97 Janis Cresswell
- 1997–98 George Chapman
- 1998–99 Susan Levett
- 1999–00 Anita Oakley
- 2000–01 Mike Dobson
- 2001–02 Joyce Oxley
- 2002–03 Stephen Cresswell
- 2003–04 Jill Anderson
- 2004–05 Peter Homewood
- 2005–06 Derek Still
- 2006–07 Russell Dorling
- 2007–08 Ann Kemp
- 2008–09 Christopher Smith
- 2009–11 Sue Murray (two terms)
- 2011–12 Brian Luker
- 2012–13 Dave Davis
- 2013–14 Howard Rogers
- 2014–15 Sasha Luck
- 2015–16 Owen Baldock
- 2016–17 Mark Rhodes
- 2017–18 Roger Dalton
- 2018–19 Pam Bates
- 2019–21 Jill Anderson
- 2021-22 Roger Roud
- 2022–23 Sue Bell
- 2023–24 James Lark
- 2024– Steve Hammond

== Freedom of the Borough ==
The following people and military units have received the Freedom of the Borough of Tonbridge and Malling.

=== Individuals ===
- David Say: 20 June 1987
- David O Davis: 20 June 1987
- Arnold Jones : 2 August 1991
- Jean Marwood: 6 September 1991
- Barry Hughes: 25 October 1991
- Sir John Stanley: 7 May 1994
- Marion Cole: 11 May 1996
- Michael Stone: 11 May 1996
- Patricia Barnes: 7 April 2000
- Roy Barnes: 7 April 2000
- Sheila Farmer: 7 April 2000
- John Jukes: 11 July 2000
- Kelly Holmes: 24 April 2001
- Janice Browne: 23 November 2007
- Godfrey Horne: 23 November 2007
- Derek Still: 23 November 2007
- Dr Gordon Court: 30 March 2012
- Michael Dobson: 30 March 2012
- David Thornewell: 30 March 2012
- Mark Worrall: 24 January 2013 (Posthumous)
- Susan Murray: 9 December 2015
- Elizabeth Simpson: 9 December 2015
- Peter Bolt: 16 August 2019.
- Owen Charles Baldock MIET: 12 July 2022
- Jill Anderson: 14 May 2024
- Nicolas Heslop: 14 May 2024

=== Military Units ===
- The Princess of Wales's Royal Regiment.
- 29 Squadron, RAF.

- 220 Medical Squadron, 256 Multi-Role Medical Regiment

== See also ==
- List of places of worship in Tonbridge and Malling
- Listed buildings in the borough of Tonbridge and Malling, Kent
