= Malling Abbey =

Monastery in Kent, United Kingdom

Coordinates: 51°17′36″N 0°24′44″E

St Mary's Abbey, also known as Malling Abbey, is an abbey of Anglican Benedictine nuns located in West Malling, Kent, England. It was founded around 1090 by Gundulf, Bishop of Rochester and dissolved in 1538. The site became a monastery again in the late 19th century.

== History ==
The manor of West Malling was given by King Edmund I to Burgric (or Burhic), Bishop of Rochester, in 946. The land was lost to the church in the Danish Wars but was restored to the diocese in 1076. About 1090, Bishop Gundulf of Rochester, a former monk of Bec Abbey in Normandy, chose Malling as the site of his foundation for a community of Benedictine nuns, one of the first post-Conquest monasteries for women. Just before his death in 1108, Gundulf appointed the French nun Avicia as the first abbess.

Gundulf had endowed the community with the manor of Malling and Archbishop Anselm had given the manor of East Malling. Royal grants gave the nuns the rights to weekly markets and annual fairs as well as wood-cutting and pasturage rights in nearby royal forests. Bequests and gifts also added to the community's income.

The western end of the Norman abbey church of St Mary's Abbey, probably completed towards the end of the 12th century

As the abbey prospered, West Malling became a flourishing market town. In the four-and-a-half centuries of Benedictine life at the abbey, major events included a fire in 1190 which destroyed much of the abbey and town, the Black Death in 1349 which reduced the community to four nuns and four novices, and the surrender of Malling to the Crown on 28 October 1538 during the Dissolution of the Monasteries.

The last elected abbess, Elizabeth Rede, had been deposed when she defied both Henry VIII and Thomas Cromwell over the appointment of a high steward for the abbey. Margaret Vernon, who had been tutor to Cromwells's son, and had already surrendered Little Marlow Priory, was appointed Abbess of Malling in her place. On 28 October 1538, two agents of the Crown seized the abbey seal and signed the deed of surrender, but apparently were unable to persuade a single nun to sign.

Immediately before the Dissolution, Malling Abbey had an annual income of £245, placing it among the wealthiest third of women's communities in England. With its outlying lands, its Norman church, Early English cloister, early 15th-century guest house and two early 16th-century gatehouses, it was a rich prize for the Crown. During the 350 years that followed, the abbey was owned by many families, most being absentee owners.

The buildings fell into ruin until the mid-1700s when Frazer Honeywood, a London banker, built a neo-gothic mansion and repaired the remaining medieval fabric. In 1892, the property was purchased by Charlotte Boyd whose life's work it was to create a trust to restore church property to its original use. She invited a small Anglican Benedictine community, the Community of Saints Mary and Scholastica, to settle at the abbey.

This community had been founded by Fr Ignatius of Llanthony Abbey (Joseph Leycester Lyne) but had become independent of his rule in 1879, with Mother Hilda Stewart OSB as their abbess – the first Anglican Benedictine abbess since the English Reformation. This community left Malling Abbey in 1911, joined the Roman Catholic Church in 1913 and now resides at Curzon Park Abbey, Chester.

== Present ==
The Anglican Benedictine community of nuns that has made its home at Malling Abbey since 1916 was founded in 1891 as an active parish sisterhood. The sisters worked among the poor in Edmonton, north London, until they became attracted to the Benedictine contemplative life through the preaching of Abbot Aelred Carlyle. In 1906, they moved to a farmhouse in Baltonsborough, a remote village in Somerset, to begin their enclosed monastic life under Benedictine vows. They were originally called the "Community of the Holy Comforter". In 1916, the trustees of Malling Abbey invited them to move to the more spacious and historic abbey and to continue its tradition of Benedictine prayer, worship, work, study and hospitality.

St Augustine's College of Theology, a non-residential theological college, has been located at St Benedict's Centre at the Abbey since 2016.

== Buildings ==
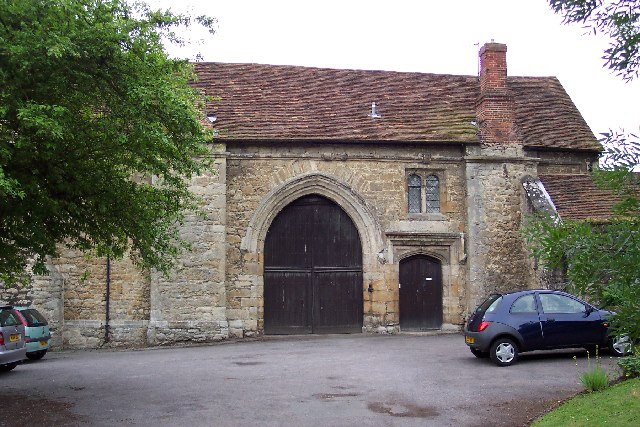
Malling Abbey gatehouse

Little of the original building is now standing; the tower is Norman up to the first two storeys and Early English above. Attached to the tower are some remnants of the church, one of the transepts and a wall of the nave; the refectory is also standing. The cloisters were re-erected in the 14th century. There is also a Grade II* 1966 abbey church which is used by the community built by architects Maguire & Murray.

== Sources ==
- Malling Abbey Archives: for a collation of extant information and publications of the Vita Gundulfi and general histories.
- The National Archives: for Royal Grants and the 1538 Deed of Surrender.
- Kent Archives Office: for information about the Abbey's relationship to the Bishops and Diocese of Rochester, and local history.

== See also ==
- List of monastic houses in Kent
- List of monastic houses in England
