= Priory Mill =

Priory Mill may refer to:

== Watermills ==
- Priory Mill, a watermill belonging to Abergavenny Priory, Monmouthshire
- Priory Mill, a watermill belonging to Hough Priory, Lincolnshire
- Priory Mill, a watermill belonging to Lechlade Priory, Gloucestershire
- Priory Mill, a watermill belonging to Leeds Priory, Kent
- Priory Mill, a watermill at Llanddew, Breconshire
- Priory Mill, a watermill belonging to Michelham Priory, East Sussex
- Priory Mill, a watermill belonging to Monk Bretton Priory, South Yorkshire
- Priory Mill, a watermill belonging to Monmouth Priory, Monmouthshire
- Priory Mill, a watermill in Norton, South Yorkshire
- Priory Mill, a watermill belonging to Pill Priory, Pembrokeshire
- Priory Mill, a tide mill in Rochester, Kent
- Priory Mill, a watermill belonging to Tonbridge Priory, Kent
- Priory Mill, a watermill on the River Ryton in Worksop, Nottinghamshire

== Steam mills ==
- Upper Priory Cotton Mill, a cotton mill in Birmingham, Warwickshire

== Windmills ==
- Priory Mill, Fritton, a drainage mill in St Olaves, Norfolk
