= Great Comp Garden =

Georgian farmhouse and garden

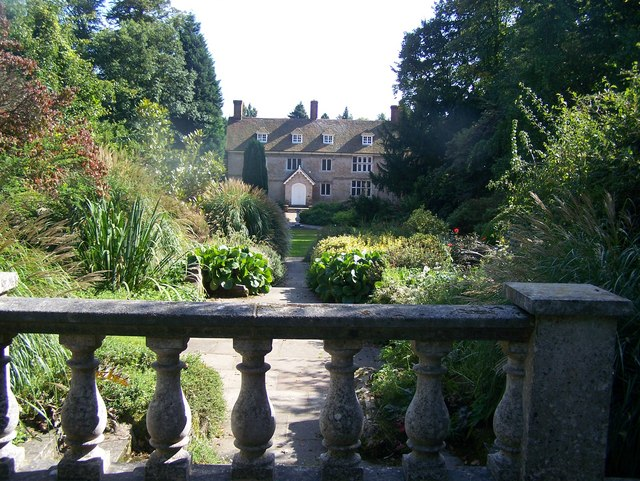
- 17th century manor house, with formal terrace lawns and island beds
- Interactive map of Great Comp Garden
- Location: Comp, near Platt, Kent, UK
- Coordinates: 51.287°N 0.339°E
- Area: 7.5 acres (30,000 m^{2})
- Opened: 1965
- Owner: Great Comp Charitable Trust
- Operator: William Dyson (as curator)
- Status: Open April–November, 7 days per week.
- Plants: perennials and shrubs
- Species: salvias, hellebores, magnolias, azaleas and rhododendrons
- Collections: Arboretum, exotic shrubs, heathers, rock garden, salvias
- Website: Great Comp Garden

Great Comp Garden is a Georgian farmhouse and garden, located on Comp Lane near the hamlet of Comp in the civil parishes of Platt and Offham, in the Tonbridge and Malling district of Kent, England. It was initially developed by Roderick and Joyce Cameron from the 1950s onwards, and features an Italian garden. It opened to the public in 1968, and now holds regular garden festivals and outdoor theatre productions.

== History ==
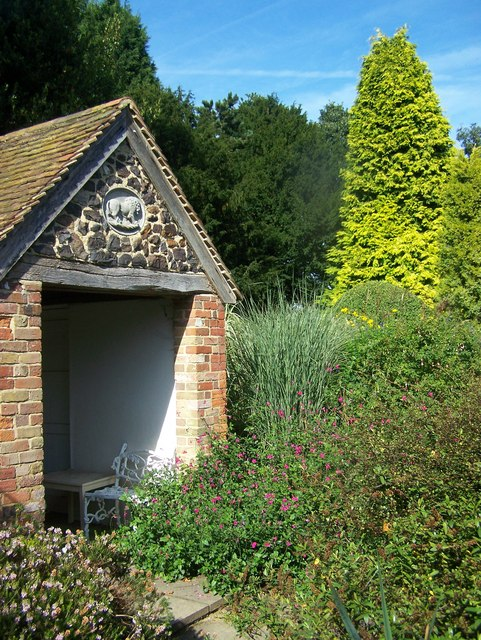
The Lion Summerhouse within the garden

Great Comp Garden is the creation of Roderick and Joyce Cameron (formerly Joyce Trafford Riggall), after they moved to the 17th century manor in 1957 (which has been Grade II* listed since 1952), with the idea of developing the garden into a plantsman’s delight. The house was once a farmhouse; the stables have been converted into the Old Dairy Tearooms.

They originally started with 4.5 acres, and in 1962 and 1975 added more land to the garden. They created an Italian Garden, and explorable 'ruins' and a 'temple' (all hand built by Roderick), using sand and stone from the garden. The ruins and statuary (including Pope's Urn and Longleat Urn) add interesting focal points to the densely planted garden.

The garden features rhododendrons, magnolias (over 30 varieties of this shrub), azaleas, salvias, crocosmias, dahlias and other exotic plants in the region. The Camerons planted up to 380 shrubs and trees in the garden.

The garden first opened up to the public in 1968. It had an entrance fee of 10p and had around 200 visitors on the opening days. The garden then opened for the National Garden Scheme, for which it still opens on certain days.

In 1980, Roderick was elected to the RHS Council, which he greatly enjoyed, despite disagreements with various RHS members.

The storms of 1987 and 1990 caused major damage to the garden. But the Camerons turned this tragedy into a positive by planting more plants.

When his wife died in 1992, Roderick set up the Great Comp Charitable Trust to keep the garden open and running. He stayed in the house until he was 90 and then moved to a local residential home but died after a short illness.

After Roderick died (and was buried alongside his wife under the lawn at the front of the house), the trust sold several items from inside the house including a George III sycamore tea caddy and an ivory and horn-veneered miniature chess table.

William Dyson then took over management of the gardens in 2000, as a curator. He previously had managed a Salvia nursery within the garden for 20 years as well as exhibiting at the Chelsea Flower Show.

== Events ==
Great Comp has four annual special events including a Spring plant fair, Summer outdoor theatre and an Autumn plant fair and garden festival. The 11th festival was in 2013.

The Coull Quartet have regularly played in the garden during summer classical music festivals. They played on 5, 12 and 18 September 2010 (after the death of Roderick Cameron).

The garden is also a venue for outdoor theatre productions. It hosted a production of William Shakespeare's The Comedy of Errors, starring Jake Hendriks in 2011, then As You Like It in 2012.

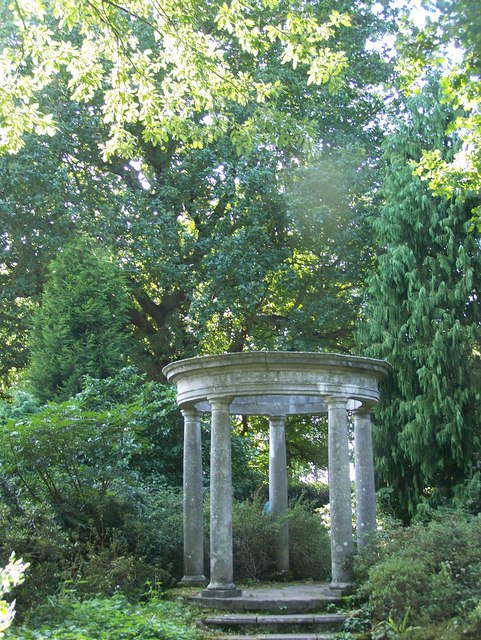
Temple within the garden

== See also ==
- List of tourist attractions in Kent
