= Comp, Kent =

Hamlet in Kent, England

Coordinates: 51°17′06″N 0°20′18″E

Comp
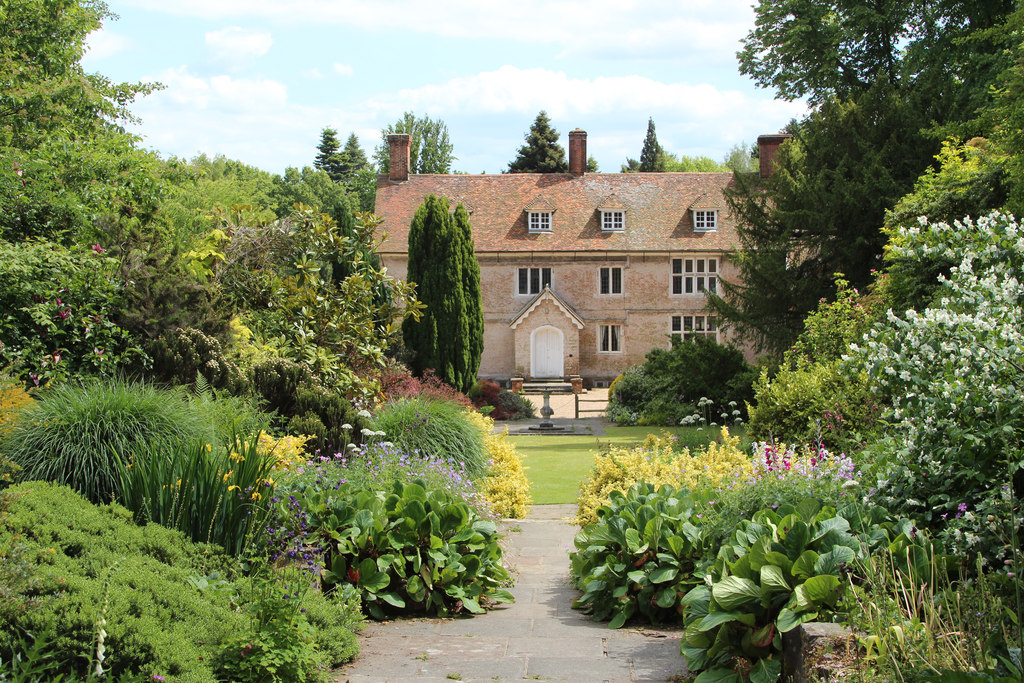
- Great Comp Gardens

- Location within Kent
- Civil parish: Platt; Offham
- District: Tonbridge and Malling
- Shire county: Kent
- Region: South East
- Country: England
- Sovereign state: United Kingdom
- Post town: Sevenoaks
- Postcode district: TN15
- Police: Kent
- Fire: Kent
- Ambulance: South East Coast
- UK Parliament: Tonbridge

Comp is a hamlet in the civil parishes of Platt and Offham, in the Tonbridge and Malling district, in the county of Kent, England.

== History ==
In 1240, the hamlet was known as Camp de Wrotha (an abbreviation of Wrotham). It then was Caumpes in 1251 and Compe in 1461.

The name is derived from the Old English word 'Camp' meaning campus or field.

== Location ==
It is near the town of Sevenoaks, the villages of Borough Green, Platt, Wrotham Heath and the hamlet of Crouch. It is near the Mereworth Woods, and Valley Wood and on Comp Lane (a minor road).

== Transport ==
For transport there is the Borough Green & Wrotham railway station, and the A25, the A20, the A227 road and the M26, M20 and M25 motorways nearby.

== Places of interest ==
It has a garden called Great Comp.
