= Claygate Cross =

Hamlet in Kent, England

Coordinates: 51.276°N 0.310°E

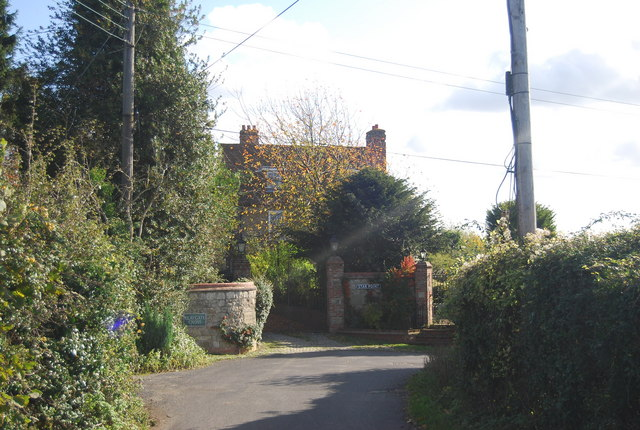
- Star Point, Claygate Cross, built in 1839.

- Location within Kent
- District: Tonbridge and Malling
- Shire county: Kent
- Region: South East
- Country: England
- Sovereign state: United Kingdom
- Post town: Sevenoaks
- Postcode district: TN15
- Police: Kent
- Fire: Kent
- Ambulance: South East Coast
- UK Parliament: Tonbridge

Claygate Cross is a hamlet in the Tonbridge and Malling district, in the English county of Kent.

== Location ==
It is near the River Bourne. Nearby settlements include the large town of Sevenoaks, the villages of Borough Green and Ightham, and the hamlets of Basted, Sheet Hill and Crouch.

== Transport ==
It is about one and a half miles east of the A227 road.
