= Basted, Kent =

Hamlet in Kent, England

Coordinates: 51°16′39″N 0°18′15″E

Basted
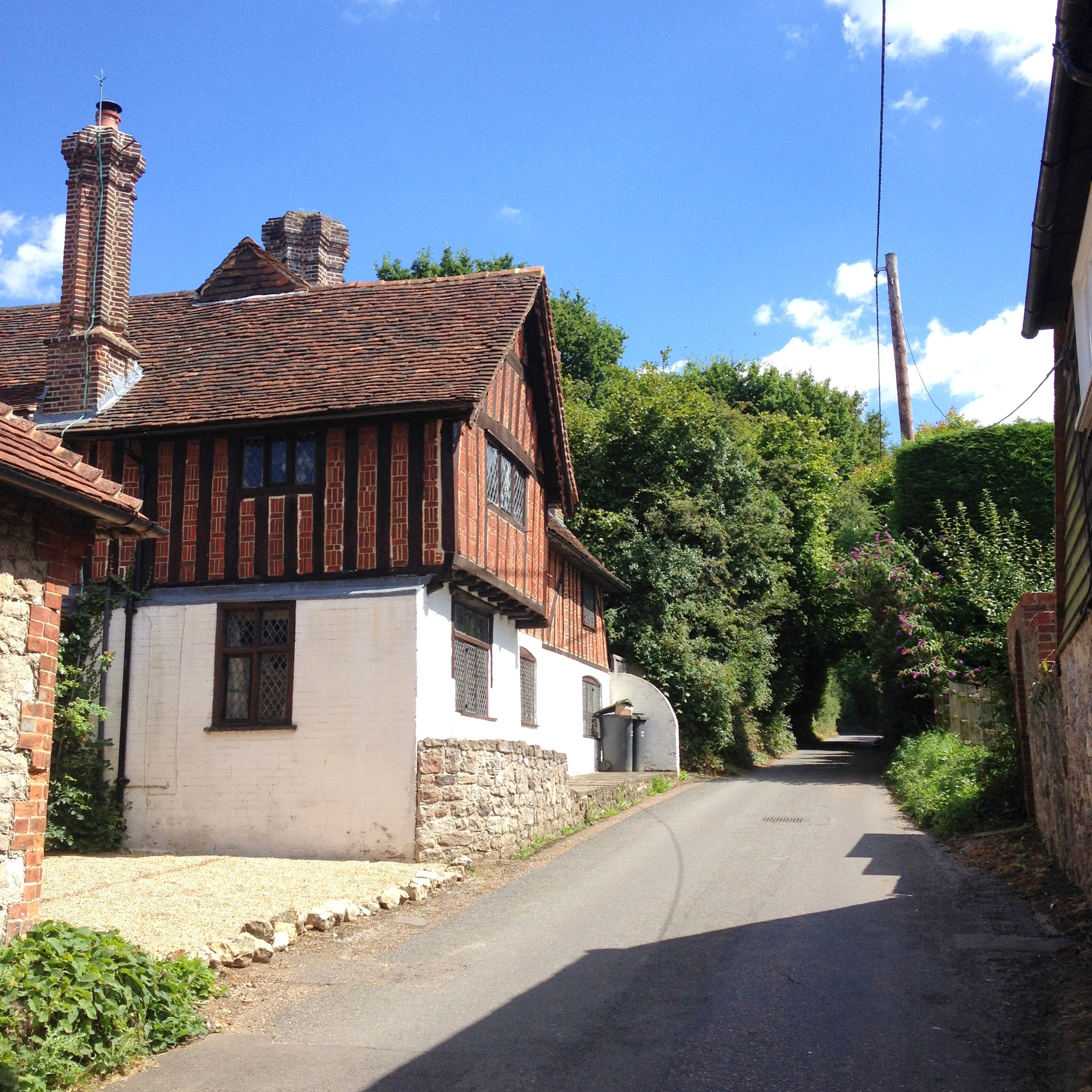
- Plough Hill, Basted

- Location within Kent
- District: Tonbridge and Malling
- Shire county: Kent
- Region: South East
- Country: England
- Sovereign state: United Kingdom
- Post town: Sevenoaks
- Postcode district: TN15
- Police: Kent
- Fire: Kent
- Ambulance: South East Coast
- UK Parliament: Tonbridge

Basted is a hamlet in the Tonbridge and Malling district, in the county of Kent, England.

== Nearby settlements ==
=== Town ===
- Sevenoaks

=== Villages ===
- Borough Green
- Ightham

=== Hamlets ===
- Claygate Cross
- Crouch

== Transport links ==
=== Railway ===
- Borough Green & Wrotham railway station

=== Roads ===
- A-roads: A20, A25, A227
- Motorways: M20, M25, M26
