= Crouch, Tonbridge and Malling =

Hamlet in Kent, England

Crouch
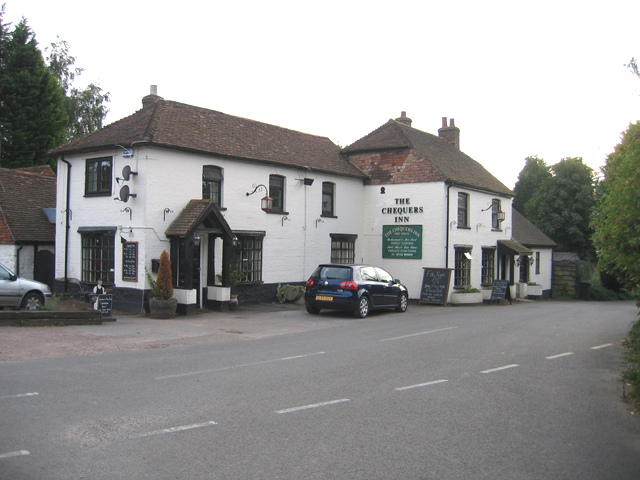
- The Chequers Inn

- Location within Kent
- Area: 0.2425 km^{2} (0.0936 sq mi)
- Population: 555 (2020 estimate)
  - Density: 2,289/km^{2} (5,930/sq mi)
- Civil parish: Platt
- District: Tonbridge and Malling
- Shire county: Kent
- Region: South East
- Country: England
- Sovereign state: United Kingdom
- Post town: Sevenoaks
- Postcode district: TN15
- Police: Kent
- Fire: Kent
- Ambulance: South East Coast
- UK Parliament: Tonbridge

Crouch is a hamlet in the civil parish of Platt, in the Tonbridge and Malling district, in the county of Kent, England. In 2020 it had an estimated population of 555.

== Location ==
It is near the large town of Sevenoaks, the villages of Borough Green, Platt and the hamlets of Comp, Claygate Cross and Basted. It is also near the Mereworth Woods, and the River Bourne.

== Transport ==
The A227 and A20 roads and the M26 and M20 motorways pass within 2 miles (3 km) of the settlement.
