= Medway watermills (middle tributaries) =

Mills on the River Medway, Kent, England

The Medway and its tributaries and sub-tributaries have been used for over 1,150 years as a source of power. There are over two hundred sites where the use of water power is known. These uses included corn milling, fulling, paper making, iron smelting, pumping water, making gunpowder, vegetable oil extraction, and electricity generation. Today, there is just one watermill working for trade. Those that remain have mostly been converted. Such conversions include a garage, dwellings, restaurants, museums and a wedding venue. Some watermills are mere derelict shells, lower walls or lesser remains. Of the majority, there is nothing to be seen. A large number of tributaries feed into the River Medway. The tributaries that powered watermills will be described in the order that they feed in. The mills are described in order from source to mouth. Left bank and right bank are referred to as though the reader is facing downstream. This article covers the watermills on the tributaries that feed in below Penshurst and above Yalding.

== The Southborough Bourne ==
A stream rises in Colebrook Park, Pembury, and enters the Medway from the left below Town Mills, Tonbridge. Anciently known as the Calverley Stream, it powered three watermills.

=== Vauxhall (Bourne Mill) Furnace, Southborough ===
TQ 5925 4402 51°10′22″N 0°16′42″E

The location of this furnace is near Mote Farm, Southborough. Iron smelted here was worked at the forge downstream. The forge was in operation from 1552, when it was owned by the Duke of Northumberland and Robert True was the ironfounder. Late in 1552, the Duke leased the furnace for 40 years to Sir George Harper and Thomas Culpeper, with permission to build another furnace and forge. Culpeper quit the lease in 1571 and in 1573 David Willard was working for Sir Thomas Fane. In 1588, Edmund and Abraham Willard were ironfounders at Bourne Mill Furnace, most likely to have been Vauxhall. The ironworks were mentioned in leases of 1622 and 1678, but appear to have been idle in 1653 and 1664. A powder mill was erected here in 1771. A few remains of the waterwheel were on site in 1933. The dam has been measured at 60 metres (66 yd) long and 2.5 metres (8 ft 2 in) high.

=== Brook (Broakes, Old Forge) Mill, Southborough ===
TQ 594 428 51°09′44″N 0°16′50″E

David Willard built this forge for Sir Thomas Fane in 1553. It was a forge in 1574 and worked in conjunction with Vauxhall Furnace from 1623 to 1679. It was a Pestle mill in 1763. It was a gunpowder mill from 1771 to at least 1801, possibly until 1812. A corn mill was built in 1845 and was working until 1942.^{A}

=== Bourne Mill, Southborough ===
TQ 597 446 51°10′44″N 0°17′03″E

This mill is marked by Bournemill Farm. It is thought to have been a furnace.

=== Priory Mill, Tonbridge ===
TQ 693 455 51°11′03″N 0°25′18″E

This mill belonged to Tonbridge Priory. In 1865, the miller was Thomas Seabrook Jr. The mill was disused in the 1930s but nothing remains now to show where the mill stood. It had an overshot waterwheel.^{A}

== Tudeley Brook ==
A stream rises at Colts Hill, Brenchley and enters the Medway from the right bank downstream of the Southborough Bourne. It powered two watermills.

=== Keyes Mill, Pembury ===
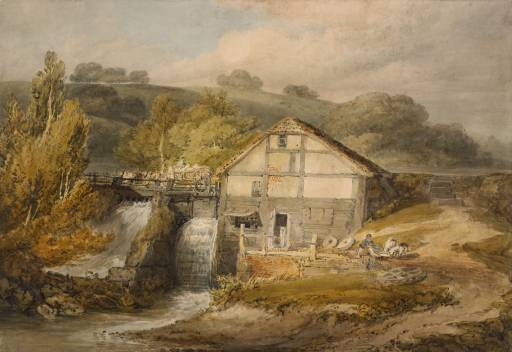
Keyes Mill c. 1796.

This watermill had a wooden overshot waterwheel. It was standing c. 1796, when it was painted by J. M. W. Turner and was working until at least 1885.

=== Badsell Mill, Paddock Wood ===
This mill site is to the north-west of the crossroads between the B2017 and A228.^{A}

== Tributary of the Tudeley Brook ==
=== Spring Grove Mill, Pembury ===
TQ 633 431 51°09′51″N 0°20′06″E This mill stood in Redwings Lane. In the thirteenth century it was given by Simon de Wahull to Bayham Abbey.

== Pen Stream ==
The Pen Stream rises to the west of Dene Park in Tonbridge, entering the Medway from the left at Hadlow Stair. It powered a watermill.

=== Mill at Hadlow Stair ===
This watermill may have been in existence in 1460, when a survey of Hadlow was carried out. The Mill House was in existence then, in the occupation of Richard Bishop, and the Mill Ditch was mentioned.

== River Bourne ==
The River Bourne enters the Medway from the left at East Peckham. The River Bourne was used to power a number of watermills in its 10-mile (16 km) length. In order from source these were: Old Mill, Borough Green (corn?); Basted Mill (Platt parish) (paper); Lower Basted Mill, Plaxtol (corn?); Winfield Mill, (corn); Longmill (corn); Roughway Paper Mill; Hamptons Paper Mill (West Peckham parish); Oxonhoath Mill (corn); Bourne Mill (corn), Hadlow; Goldhill Mill (corn), Golden Green; Pierce Mill (corn); and finally Little Mill (corn), East Peckham.

=== Old Mill, Borough Green ===
TQ 606 565 51°17′06″N 0°18′14″E

Little is known of it except that the millpond was about 75 yards (68.58 m) long and 25 feet (7.62 m) wide at the mill, giving an area of up to 625 square yards (523 m^{2}). The head was about 6 feet (1.83 m).^{B}

=== Basted Paper Mill, Platt ===
TQ 607 557 51°16′40″N 0°18′18″E

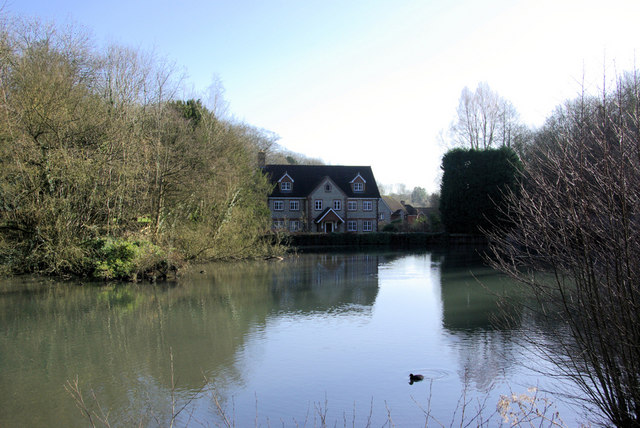
Basted Mill Pond

This paper mill was marked on Hasted's map and known to be in operation in 1716. It may be the paper mill at Wrotham which William Quelch was working in the period 1723–31. The mill pond was 175 yards (160.02 m) long and 75 feet (22.86 m) wide at the mill, giving an area of 4,375 square yards (3,658 m^{2}). George How Green was the occupier of the mill in 1835 when he leased Hamptons Paper Mill. The mill burnt down in 1917 and was rebuilt and worked by steam power until 1960. It finally closed after damage suffered in the floods of September 1968. The mill supplied paper used for postage stamps. Although often referred to as being in Borough Green, the mill site actually stands within the parish of Platt.^{A}^{,}^{C}

=== Lower Basted (Johns) Mill, Plaxtol ===
TQ 605 554 51°16′30″N 0°18′07″E

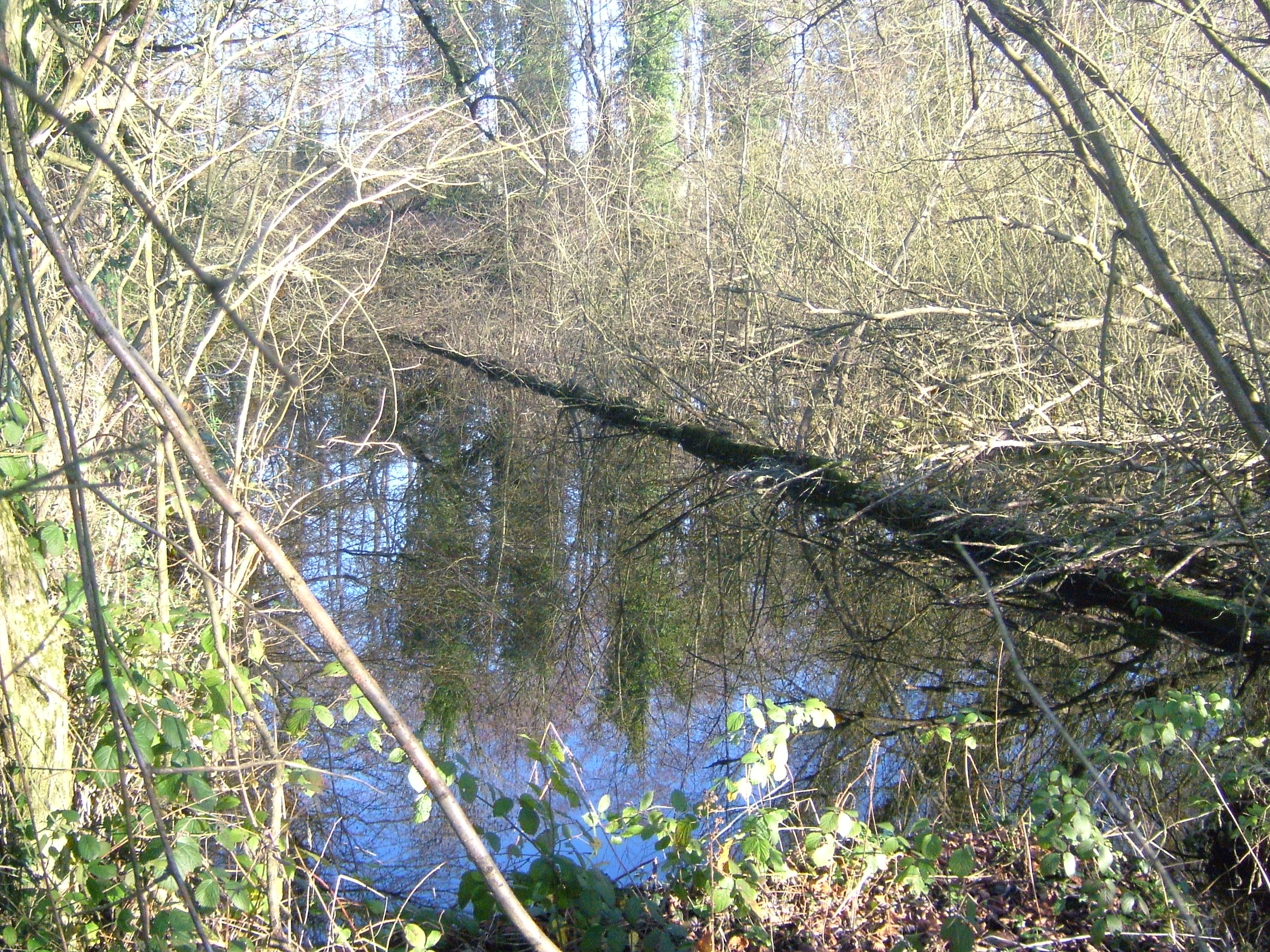
Site of John's Mill

This mill was about 100 yd (91 m) downstream of the Basted Paper Mill. This mill was marked as John's Mill on an 1825 map. The only other evidence for the mill was two fields on the Wrotham tithe map, 1840 named "Mill meadow and orchard" and "Mill meadow and old road" in the ownership of H A Wildes and the occupation of John Benge.^{B}

=== Winfield Mill, Plaxtol ===
TQ 607 551 51°16′20″N 0°18′17″E

Winfield Mill c. 1940

Winfield mill was a corn mill built of ragstone in 1836 by Eliza Carter. Millers include James Full, who died 18 March 1871 aged 66, and was buried in Plaxtol churchyard. The mill was still standing in 1930, but by 1940 it was a ruin. The Upright Shaft was of wood and the Great Spur Wheel was of compass arm construction, as shown on a photograph of 1955. The overshot waterwheel was 11 feet (3.35 m) in diameter and 12 feet (3.66 m) wide, housed internally in the mill, and was constructed in 1874 by Messrs. Weeks of Maidstone. Some stones still remain at the site. An earlier mill on this site was known as "Windfield Mille" in 1699 and was then in the occupation of John Dutnell; it was previously in the occupation of Thomas Farrett.^{A}^{,}^{B}

=== Longmill, Plaxtol ===
TQ 614 536 51°15′31″N 0°18′51″E

A long-lost corn mill site, commemorated today by Longmill Lane.

=== Roughway Paper Mill, Plaxtol ===
TQ 615 528 51°15′05″N 0°18′55″E

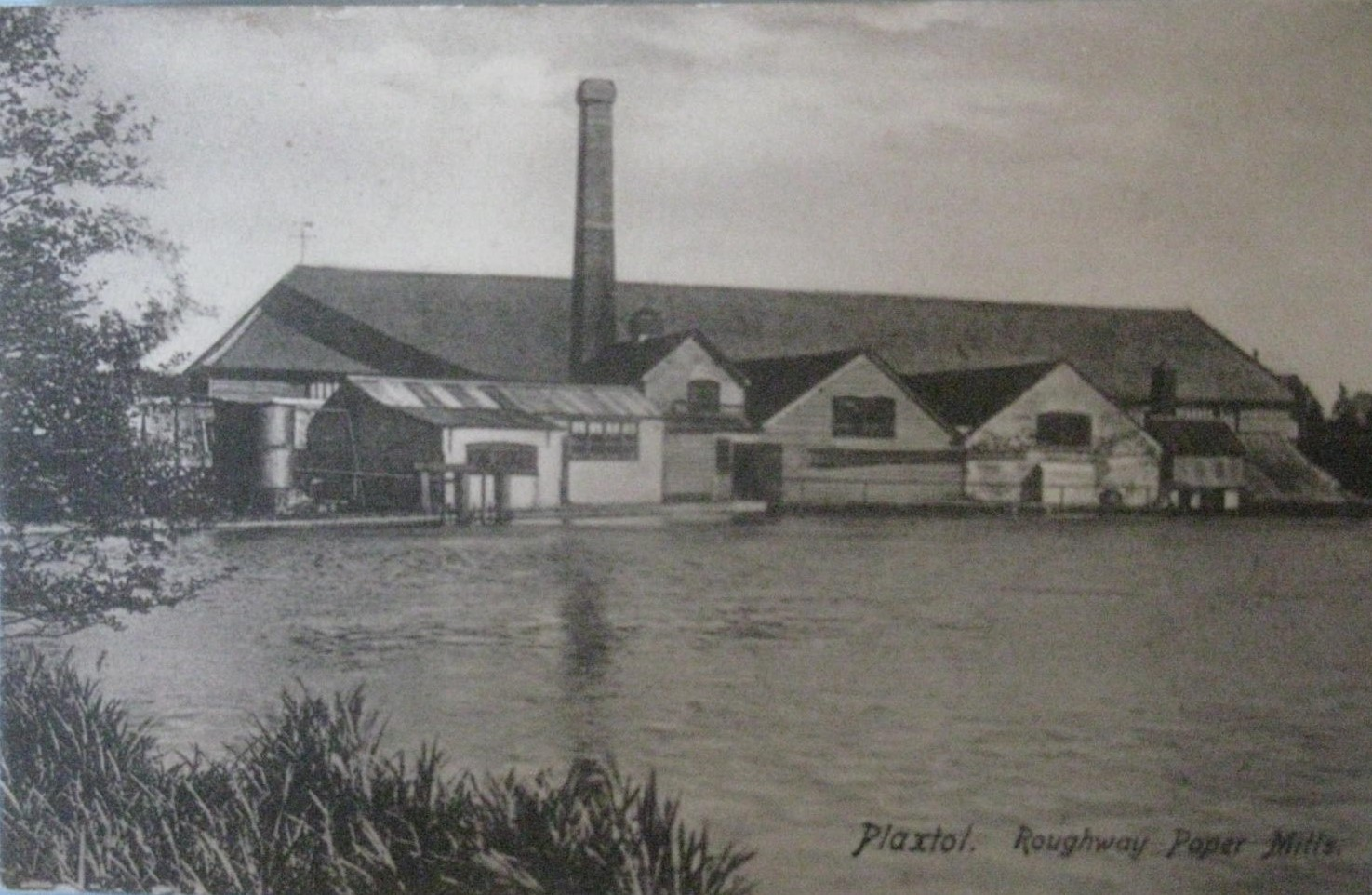
Roughway Paper Mill, 1904.

This mill was built c. 1807 and was powered by steam and water. The mills were worked by Messrs, Turner & Co from at least 1862 to post 1882 and produced paper which Messrs. De La Rue used for printing colonial postage stamps. Latterly a 9 feet (2.74 m) diameter by 4 feet (1.22 m) wide breastshot waterwheel was used to drive bellows for the steam engine. There was a tall chimney which was a local landmark but this was demolished in 1997 after a fire.^{A}

=== Hamptons Paper Mill, West Peckham ===
TQ 617 521 51°14′42″N 0°19′04″E

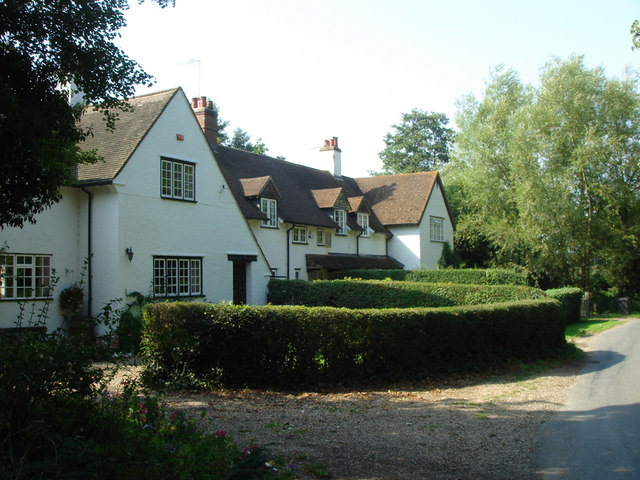
Old Mill Cottages, Hamptons Road

This paper mill was built in 1740 by Thomas West, carpenter, of West Peckham for William Burtenshaw, papermaker, of Wrotham for £175 and was active until the 1880s. When built it was 75 feet (22.86 m) long and 24 feet (7.32 m) wide. In 1759 the mill was leased by Isabella and William Dalyson to Mrs Elizabeth Buttonshaw for 21 years at £45 per annum. Previous occupiers of the mill were William Steddolph and Thomas Dalison. John Buttonshaw died on 12 February 1827 and the lease then passed to Elizabeth Buttonshaw. In 1835 John Buttanshaw surrendered his lease on the mill to Maximilian Dudley Digges Dalison. George How Green leasing the mill from 1833 at £100 per annum, and insuring the mill and building for a total of £1,500. Only traces of the foundations remain. It probably had an overshot waterwheel, housed internally. A paper-making machine was sold from this mill in 1872. The mill straddled the parish boundary of Shipbourne and West Peckham. It was demolished c. 1890. The mill cottages survive on the opposite side of the road to the mill site.^{A}

=== Oxonhoath Mill, West Peckham ===
TQ 621 515 51°14′22″N 0°19′24″E

The site has been occupied since 1259. It may be the site of "Toyesmede mill" lying in the Hadlow boundary of the Lowy of Tonbridge in c. 1258. The mill has at various times been a fulling mill and a corn mill. The mill was at one time owned by the Geary family and worked by William Young and his son Edward in the period 1847–75. Robert Blunden was the miller in 1882. The mill building was standing in 1930 although the machinery had been removed by then. It had a single storey brick base and three storeys built of timber on top. Only a part of the lower walls remain today.^{A}

=== Bourne (Hope, Lambert's) Mill, Hadlow ===
TQ 627 503 51°13′43″N 0°19′52″E

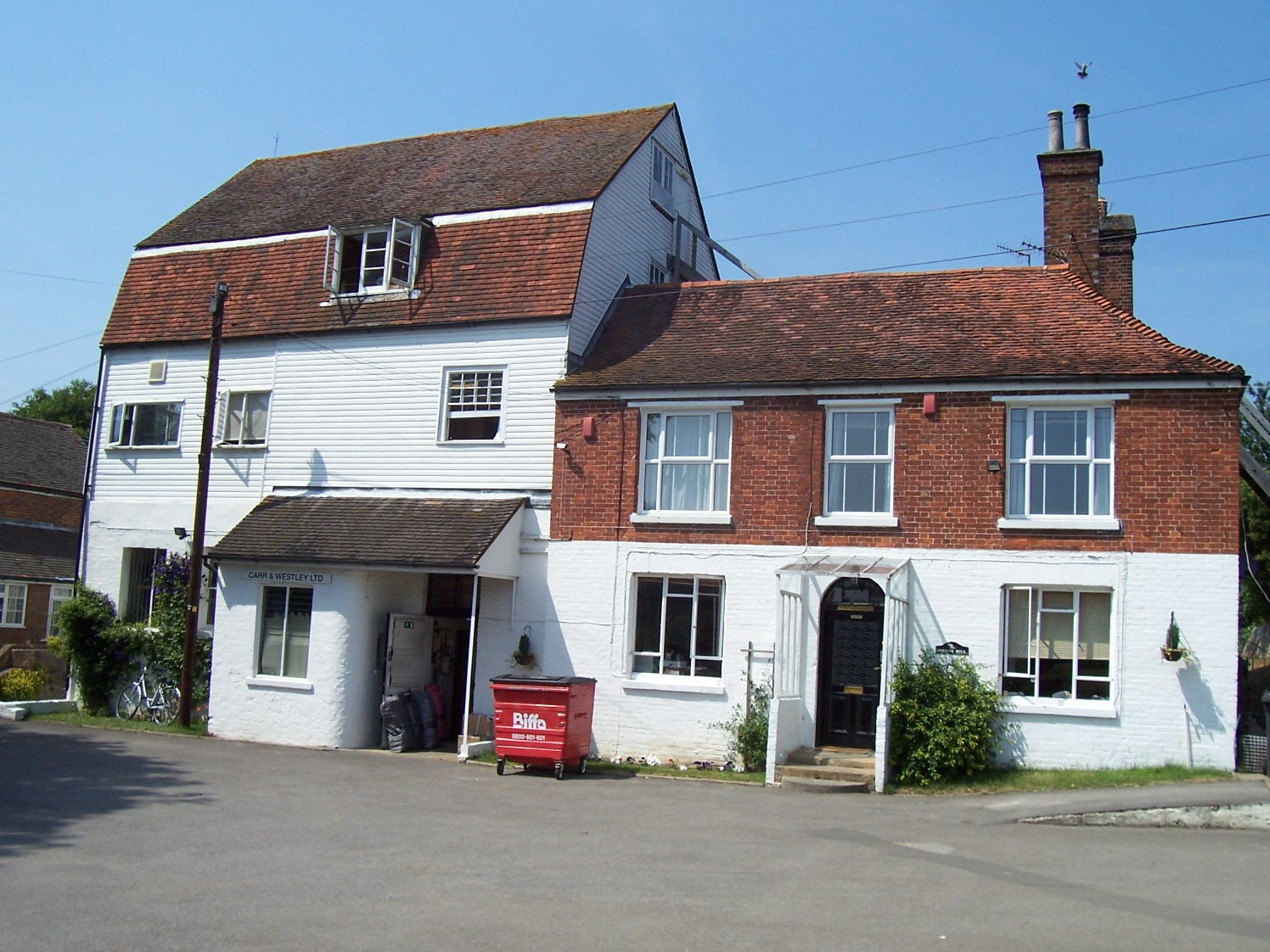
Bourne Mill, Hadlow

This may be a Domesday site, Haslow (Hadlow) being assessed as having 2 mills. The mill still stands, and had a large external high breast shot waterwheel. The millpond was about 15 yards (14 m) by 30 yards (27 m), or 450 square yards (380 m^{2}) in area. Apart from the cast iron wheel axle and wooden upright shaft, The cast iron pit wheel survives. The crown wheel was of compass arm construction. The mill was working until 1947, millers in the latter days being John Thirsk (there in 1931) and Thomas Lambert before him. A Mr. Carr took over the mill in 1947 and established a small clothing factory, still trading today as Carr & Westley Ltd. The mill was also known as Hope Mill, being part of Hope Farm.^{A}

=== Goldhill (Bourneside, Victoria) Mill, Golden Green ===
TQ 636 484 51°12′41″N 0°20′36″E

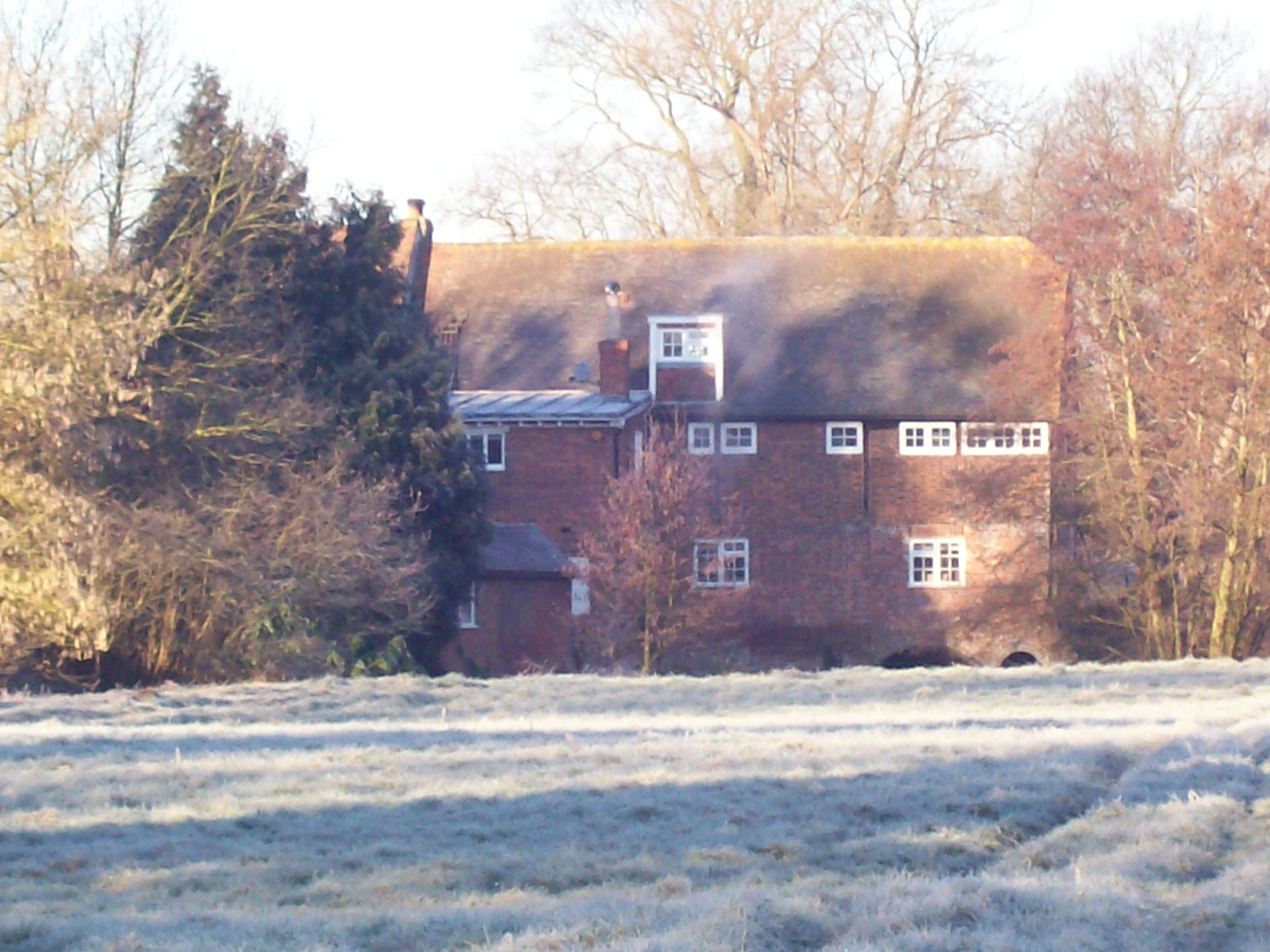
Goldhill Mill

Golden Green is a hamlet within Hadlow parish. A mill may have been on this site since Domesday. This Grade II listed mill is the only mill on the Bourne to retain most of its milling machinery. The internal waterwheel is of iron, and is breast shot. It is 14 feet (4.27 m) diameter and 7 feet (2.13 m) wide. on a cast iron axle. The pit wheel is 10 feet (3.05 m) diameter and has 120 cogs, driving a 2 feet 6 inches (760 mm) diameter wallower with 35 teeth on a 17 inches (430 mm) diameter wooden upright shaft. The Great Spur Wheel is 6 feet 8 inches (2.03 m) diameter and has 92 cogs. The date 1848 is on a plinth at the bottom of the Upright shaft, and may indicate the date of the existing waterwheel and machinery. The crown wheel was used latterly to drive the electricity generator, with one of the stone nuts being adapted as the driven gear. The mill had two pairs of millstones and last ground corn c. 1920. The sack hoist does not survive. In the early-mid 20th century, the mill was used to generate electricity, but the apparatus has now been removed. The mill was also known as Bourneside Mill and Victoria Mill (Victoria Road is downstream of the mill). The outbuildings around the mill have been converted into holiday cottages.^{A}

=== Pierce Mill, Golden Green ===
TQ 646 484 approx 51°12′40″N 0°21′27″E

Little is known of this mill, but it is commemorated today by Pierce Mill Lane. The mill was named after the millers, the Pierce family.

=== Little Mill, East Peckham ===
TQ 657 482 51°12′32″N 0°22′24″E

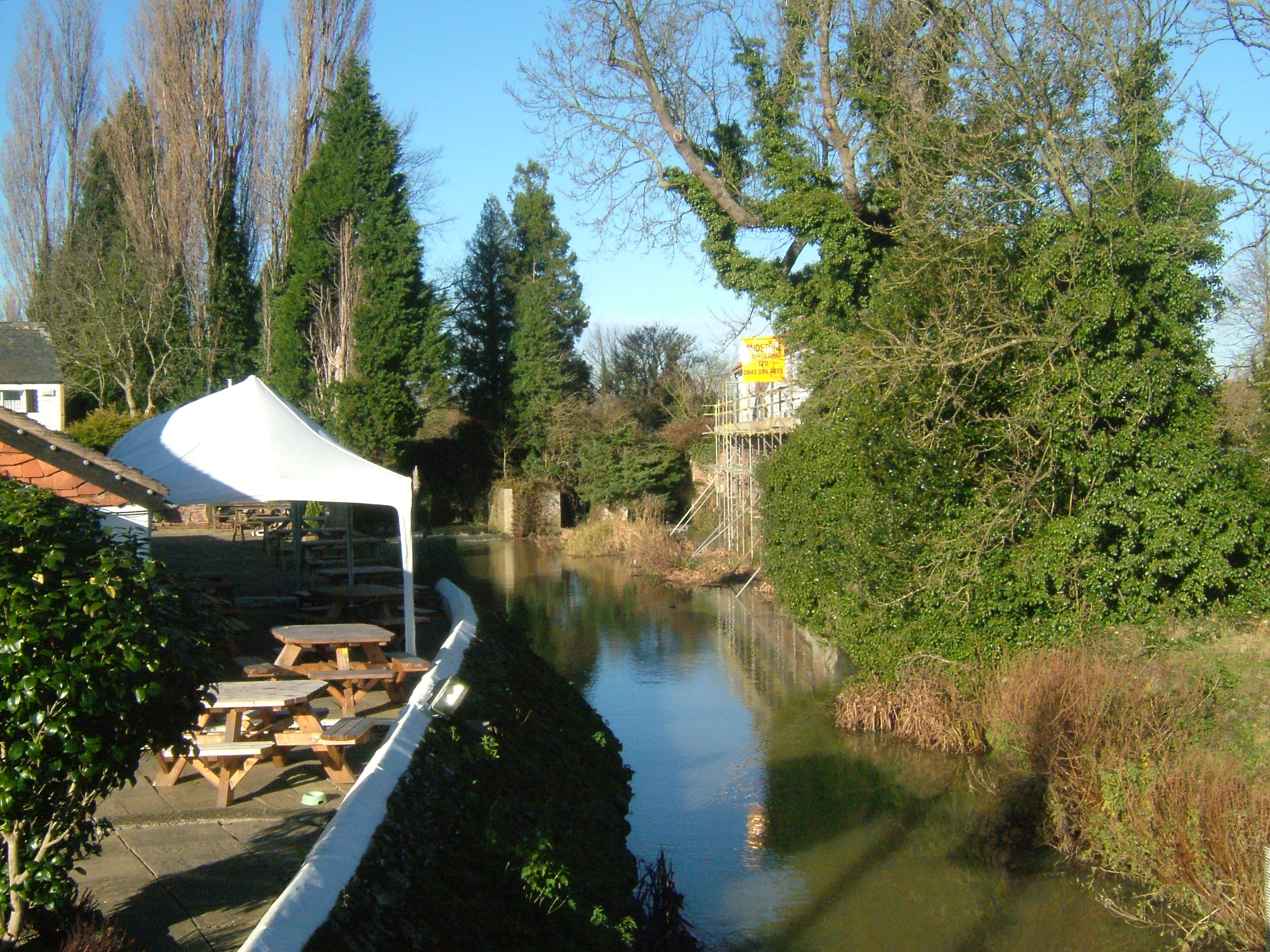
On the left are the gardens of the Man of Kent Pub, to the right the site of Little Mill

This mill still stands, part of the building being converted to a private dwelling, part demolished. The waterwheel was breastshot.^{A}

== Tributaries of the Bourne ==
A tributary of the Bourne rises in the Hildenborough parish and flows through Shipbourne where it powered a watermill, Uridge's Mill, Shipbourne (corn) and a pump at Claygate before flowing into the Bourne downstream of Hamptons Paper Mill. A tributary of this tributary drove a water powered sawmill at Fairlawne Home Farm, Shipbourne. A tributary enters the Bourne at Basted Paper Mills. It may have powered a watermill in Crouch (Platt parish).

=== Uridge's Mill, Shipbourne ===
This mill was named after the miller, Robert Uridge, who worked the mill for sixteen years during the 1870s and 1880s. The exact location is not known. The mill may have gone by the name Puttenden Mill, but this could also have been Hamptons Paper Mill.

=== Claygate pump, Shipbourne ===
TQ 605 517 approx 51°14′30″N 0°18′01″E

This was a breast shot wheel driving a pump again the exact location is not known.

=== Fairlawne Saw Mill, Plaxtol ===
An estate saw mill, driven by a breast shot mill was located at Fairlawne Home Farm.

=== Crouch Mill, Platt ===
There may have been a watermill at Salmons Farm, Crouch. The only reference to it being the Wrotham Tithe Award of 1845 noting a hop garden of 2 acres (8,100 m^{2}) and 35 perches "adjoining mill."

== River Teise ==
The River Teise enters the Medway from the right at Yalding. The River Teise and its tributaries powered a number of watermills. From source to mouth they were:

=== Standings Mill, Broomhill, Tunbridge Wells ===
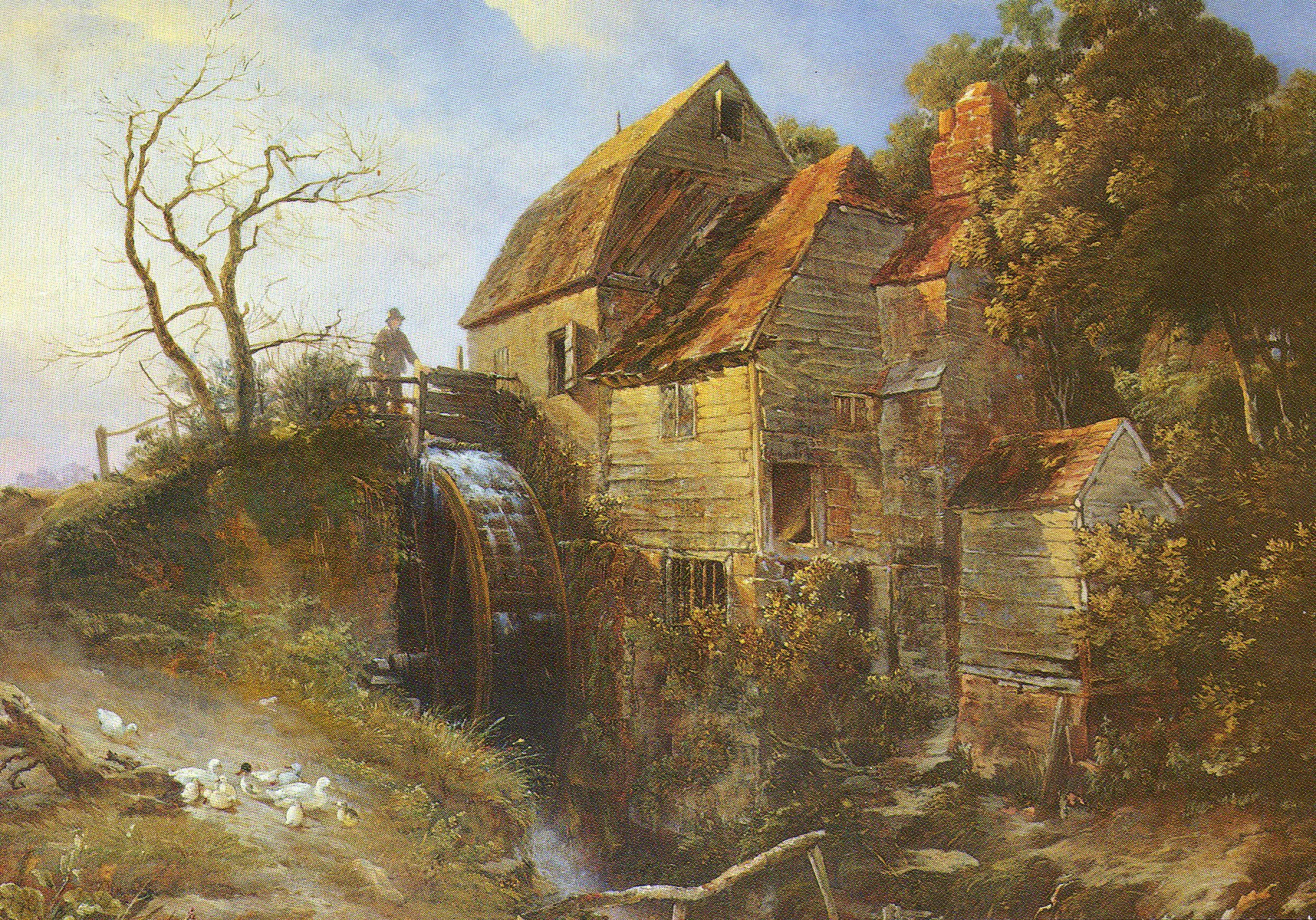
Painting by C T Dodd

This was a corn mill, driven by an overshot waterwheel. A painting of the mill by Charles Tattershall Dodd (1815–78) can be seen in Tunbridge Wells Museum & Art Gallery.

=== Bayham Abbey Forge ===
TQ 642 366 51°06′20″N 0°20′41″E

This forge was in operation in 1520, when it was leased by William Wybarne. It was still at work in 1667, the pond survives.

=== Gloucester Furnace, Lamberhurst ===
TQ 6615 3596 51°05′54″N 0°22′24″E

This furnace was built in 1695 by William Benge. In 1700 the owner was Samuel Gott. The furnace produced 200 tons of iron in 1717 and John Legas was working it in partnership with William Harrison. William Collins and George Matthews leased the furnace in 1782 but it ceased production c. 1787. There was a boring mill marked on Budgen's map of 1795.

=== Hoadly Forge, Lamberhurst ===
TQ 6622 3617 51°06′01″N 0°22′28″E

Hoadly Forge was built in 1548 by Alexander Collins. It was sold by Stephen Collins to Richard Filmer in 1584. In 1614 it was owned by Sir Edward Filmer and leased to Thomas Sanders and Thomas Ballard. The forge was bought by William Benge in 1694. The railings around St. Paul's Cathedral were cast here.^{D}

=== Furnace Mill, Lamberhurst ===
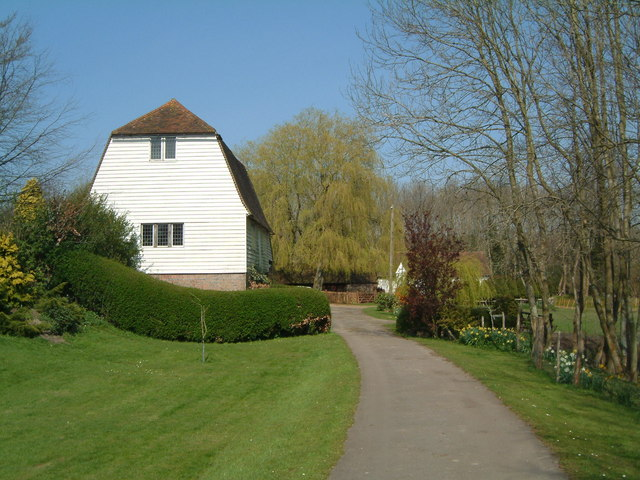
Furnace Mill.

TQ 661 361 51°06′00″N 0°22′24″E

This was a corn mill; the building survives today converted to a dwelling, devoid of machinery except the sack hoist. It was marked on Bugden's map of 1795 and the surviving building dates from c. 1812

=== Hope Mill, Goudhurst ===
TQ 708 372 51°06′31″N 0°26′27″E

This corn mill has now been house converted. It latterly worked with two waterwheels. The original wheel against the mill building and the later one set away from the mill. Both wheels were breastshot.^{B}

The older wheel.

Only the cast iron hub of this wheel remains, on a wooden axle of some 18 inches (460 mm)diameter. The wheel had eight wooden spokes per side. This breast shot wheel was 13 feet 9 inches (4.19 m) diameter by 6 feet (1.83 m) wide, with 48 floats mounted on a cast iron rim. This wheel drove three pairs of millstones by a layshaft.

The newer wheel.

This wheel was an overshot wheel, 9 feet 2 inches (2.79 m) diameter and 9 feet 3 inches (2.82 m) wide, constructed of cast iron, carried on an 8 inches (200 mm) diameter cast iron axle which was unusually long, as it had to pass over the tail race of the other waterwheel.

=== Goudhurst Paper Mill ===
TQ 716 392 approx 51°07′34″N 0°27′12″E This mill stood on the parish boundary of Horsmonden and Goudhurst. It was first mentioned in 1683, possibly replacing a fulling mill. Owners include George Culvin in 1716, Thomas West in 1725 and Edward Blackwell in the 1730s and 1740s. The mill had closed by 1755.

=== Marden (Pattenden) Mill, Marden ===
TQ 735 456 51°10′59″N 0°29′01″E

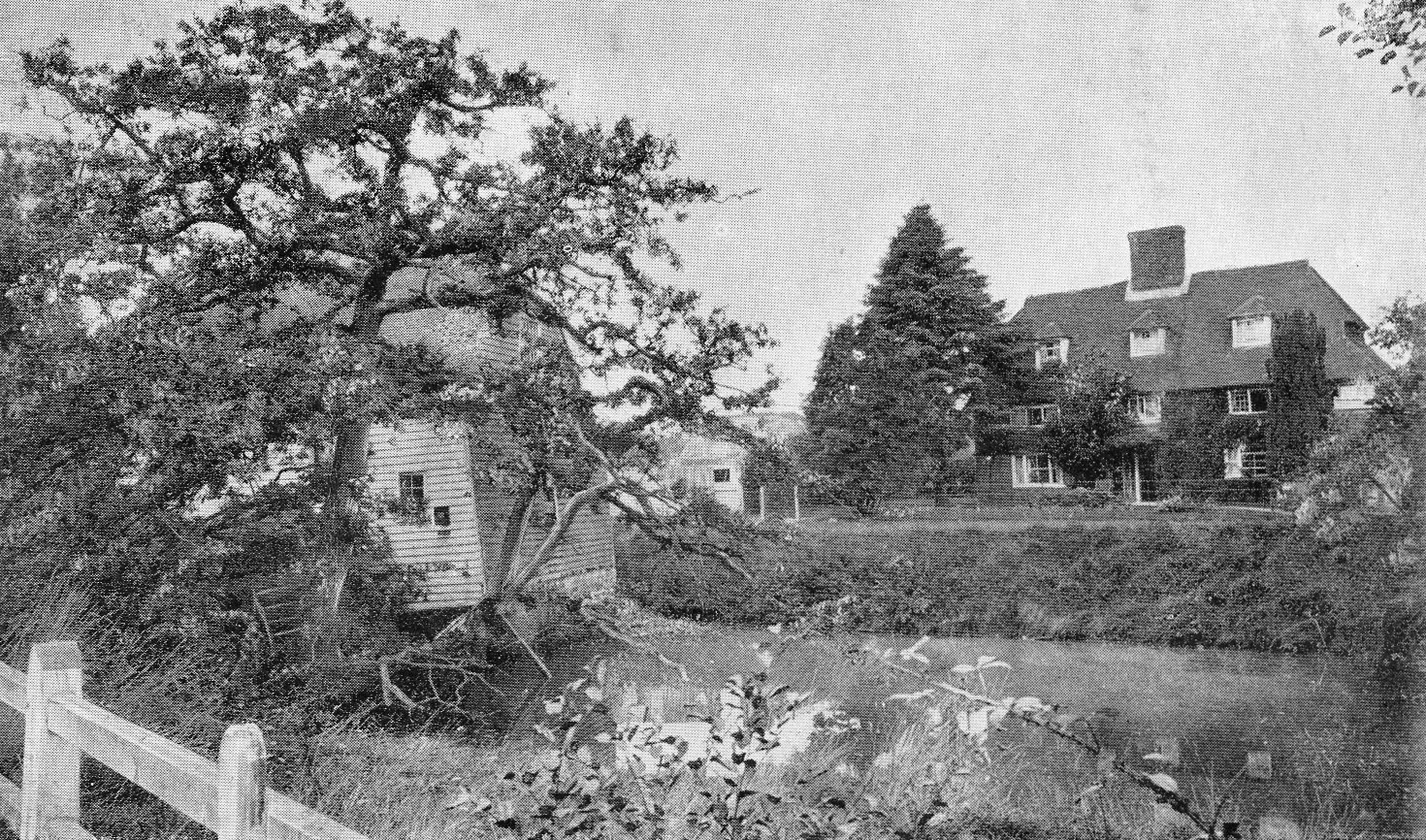
Marden Mill.

Marden, or Pattenden Mill was a corn mill on the Lesser Teise. It was a small timber-framed building of three storeys, clad in white painted weatherboarding. The mill was driven by an overshot waterwheel.

It was run by the Hammond Family, firstly by William, who died in 1808. Then by his son William until his death in 1861. William Jr was followed by his son Henry, who died in 1892 and the mill then ceased working. It was demolished in 1912.

== Tributaries of the Teise ==
=== Benhall Mill, Frant ===
TQ 607 376 51°06′54″N 0°17′49″E

This corn mill stood on the site of an old furnace mill. The forge was working 1557-1653 but disused in 1667. Benhall Mill was not marked on Budgeon's map of 1724. In 1803 the miller was Richard Jones, followed by his son Stephen until c. 1845, then Christopher and Henry Smith in partnership until 1870, then Henry alone until 1887. The mill may have continued to grind for Benhall Mill Farm after this date. The remains of the mill were demolished in 1964.

=== Brookland Forge, Frant ===
TQ 618 349 51°05′26″N 0°18′41″E

This forge was sold by Humphrey Lewknor to John Barham in 1521. It remained in the Barham's ownership until it was abandoned sometime between 1629 and 1640. In 1574 Thomas Gresham leased the forge, and sub-leased it to John Carpenter. In 1610 it was leased to Thomas Saunders. There is evidence that the forge had an overshot waterwheel. The dam has been recorded as 65 metres (71 yd) long and 1.5 metres (4 ft 11 in) high.

=== Verredge Forge, Frant. ===
TQ 621 352 51°05′35″N 0°18′57″E

This forge was also owned by the Barham family. It was sold by Humphrey Lewknor to John Barham in 1521. It was leased by Christopher Darrell in 1573 and Thomas Saunders in 1610. The forge was last mentioned in 1642. The dam has been recorded as 120 metres (130 yd) long and 3 metres (9 ft 10 in) high.

=== Bartley Mill, Frant ===
TQ 632 357 51°05′50″N 0°19′54″E

Bartley Mill stands on the Winn Stream, just within the parish of Frant, Sussex. Once the property of Bayham Abbey, it was last worked commercially in the 1900s and was restored to working order in 1990. In 1851 the miller was Leonard Latter. The Arnold family were millers here before taking Branbridges Mill, East Peckham in 1890. The last recorded miller was John Ballard in 1905. The mill is open to visitors by appointment.

=== Bedgebury Forge, Goudhurst ===
TQ 727 357 51°05′40″N 0°28′02″E The site of this forge was destroyed by the construction of the Hawkhurst Branch.

=== Bedgebury Furnace, Goudhurst ===
TQ 730 347 51°05′07″N 0°28′16″E The site of the Furnace floor is adjacent to the main farm Buildings at Furnace Farm. The Furnace lies just inside Cranbrook Parish. The only Furnace in the Parish, it lay on the parish boundary of Goudhurst and Cranbrook. It was owned by Sir Alexander Culpeper in 1574 and let to Sir Richard Baker in the second half of the reign of Queen Elizabeth I. It was let to John Dunnednoll in 1610 and in 1637 John Browne was working the forge—there was a dispute about the felling of wood for use at the iron works. George Browne was working the forge in 1657. The forge was disused by 1664, when it was then repaired, but unoccupied again in 1680.^{D} The furnace was recommissioned during the Peninsular War due to the high demand for iron for military and naval purposes, however by 1815 the furnace had all but died again, turning its work from smelt to casting; however its production was limited, as its location made transport costs high compared to furnaces in the Midlands and north-west Kent. A modified furnace continued in use at Bedgebury for some time for the firing of clay and bricks, produced by the various workshops at Cranbrook Pottery; however the advent of production in the Midlands with better availability of power, transport, labour and materials all but ended hopes of retaining industry in the area. Bedgebury furnace built new oast kilns in 1880 and again in 1912, for hops from the surrounding hop gardens. The oast kilns remain to this day. The original bloomery or hammer pond has now silted up but remains as a distinct flat flood plain which clearly defines the approximately 20 acres (8.1 ha) that originally held the water reservoir. A very substantial long pond bay/dam runs north–south and can be seen clearly, nearly 130 metres (430 ft) long, 8 metres (26 ft 3 in) high and 20 metres (65 ft 7 in) wide. The sluice has long been dismantled, however the race is clearly visible to walkers using the bridleway that crosses the river Teise on a stone bridge. The mill pool is also largely silted up, however immediately north of the pool lies the hammer floor displaying the clear relief of the original working layout. West of the site is a very large moat which originally held the iron keep.

=== Brenchley Furnace, Horsmonden ===
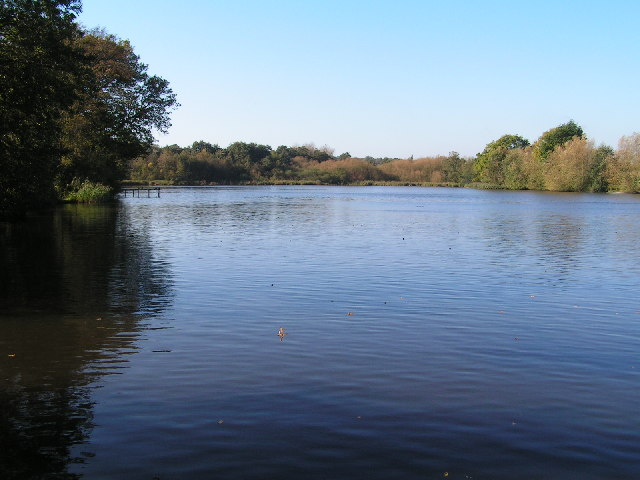
Furnace pond.

TQ 695 412 51°08′41″N 0°25′27″E

An old site, the Furnace Pond remains today, having an area of some 30 acres (12 ha). The dam across the valley is some 140 yards (130 m) in length. the head available being some 30 feet (9.14 m)'. This furnace was first mentioned in 1574, when the owner was Thomas Bartell or Brattle. In 1579 it was leased by Henry and Thomas Darrell to Thomas Dyke, with Brattle having an interest in the property. In 1588 the furnace was leased by William Ashburnham and sub-leased to Thomas Johnson, a gun-founder. In 1596 the furnace was owned by Sir Thomas Waller, and leased to John Iden and Robert Pothill. The furnace was leased by Thomas Browne in 1604 and later by John Browne, who held the office of King's Gunfounder from 1615 to 1681. Some 200 men were employed at the furnace in 1613. The furnace was working to at least 1667 and in 1744 there was a boring mill run by one Harrison.^{D}

== River Bewl (Teise tributary) ==
=== Dunsters Mill, Ticehurst ===
TQ 689 323 51°03′54″N 0°24′41″E

The site of this watermill now lies in the middle of Bewl Water. It was one of those very rare watermills that was an overdrift mill, with the millstones driven from above. This arrangement is more commonly found in windmills. When Bewl Water was built, the fourteenth century Mill House was dismantled and re-erected at Three Legged Cross, Wadhurst. The overshot waterwheel was some 12 feet (3.66 m) diameter by 6 feet 8 inches (2.03 m) wide and was carried on a wooden axle. it drove a cast iron pit wheel 10 feet 8 inches (3.25 m) diameter with 112 wooden cogs. A 5 inches (130 mm) square cast iron layshaft was driven which powered at least two pairs of millstones.^{B}

=== Chingley Forge, Goudhurst ===
TQ 682 334 51°04′34″N 0°24′07″E

The site of this ancient forge mill is now covered by the dam of Bewl Water. Chingley forge was built sometime between 1574 and 1589, when Richard Ballard was the tenant of Thomas Darell. Edward Pelham and James Thatcher bought the forge c. 1595. In 1637 the forge was leased to Henry Darell. The forge seems to have been disused in 1653 and 1664, but was at work in 1717, producing 46 tons of iron in that year. It was marked on Budgen's map of 1724 and in 1726 the tenant was John Legas. The dam has been recorded as 100 metres (110 yd) long.

=== Chingley Furnace, Goudhurst ===
TQ 684 327 51°04′08″N 0°24′16″E

The site of this ancient blast furnace is now covered by the dam of Bewl Water. It was in the Culpeper family in the sixteenth century, Thomas Collepepper holding lands in Chingley in fief from Henry VIII in 1544. The land had formerly been in the ownership of the Abbey of Boxley, which had been dissolved. The furnace was built between 1558 and 1565. In 1574 it was in the possession of Thomas Darell and the tenant was Thomas Dyke. It was sold by Edward Culpeper in 1595. In 1597 Thomas Dyke of Pembury leased Chingley Furnace to Richard Ballard of Wadhurst, and his sons Thomas and Richard. The forge was powered by an undershot waterwheel. The sites were excavated in 1968–9 by the Wealden Iron Research Group. There is evidence that Chingley Forge was a hammer mill at some time, possibly as early as the first half of the thirteenth century. The dam was recorded as 50 metres (55 yd) long and 2.5 metres (8 ft 2 in) high.

== River Beult ==
The River Beult enters the Medway from the right at Yalding downstream of the Teise. The River Beult and its tributaries powered a number of watermills. From source to mouth these were:

=== Cheveney Mill, Hunton ===
TQ 708 496 51°13′12″N 0°26′48″E

This was a corn mill, latterly converted to generate electricity c. 1900. The waterwheel was replaced by a turbine made by Messrs Drake & Fletcher of Maidstone. During the Second World War, Italian Prisoners of War were billeted in the mill building. The building survives today, converted into a house.

=== Yalding mill ===
A Domesday site, the mill was still in existence in 1336.

== Angley Brook (Beult tributary) ==
A stream rises at Angley Woods, Cranbrook and flows into the Beult at Frittenden. It powered these mills:

=== Pin Pond Mill, Cranbrook ===
This may have been a fulling mill.

=== Spratsbourne Mill, Cranbrook ===
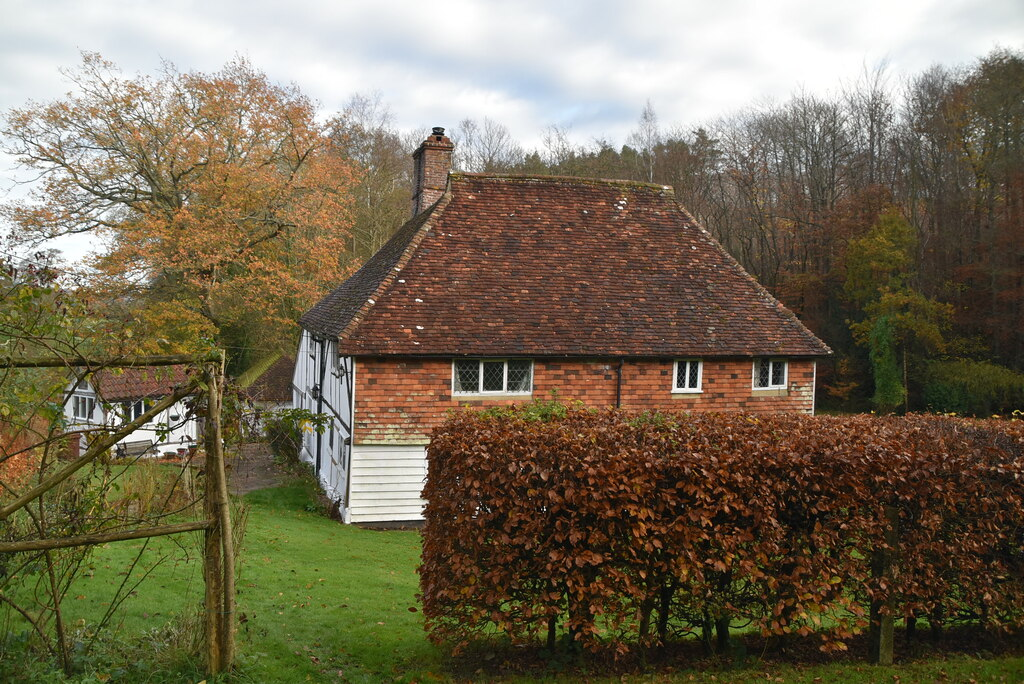
Spratsbourne Mill

The miller here was Edmund Luckhurst in 1656 and 1660.

=== Dog Kennel Mill, Cranbrook ===
An old fulling mill site.

=== Friezley Mill, Cranbrook ===
TQ 771 384 approx 51°07′03″N 0°31′53″E

An old fulling mill site.

=== Hockeredge Mill, Cranbrook ===
TQ 775 387 51°07′12″N 0°32′14″E

This mill was sold to Alexander Courthope in 1523, and his son sold it to Robert Hovenden in 1551. It remained in the Hovenden family for many years, until at least 1704. The mill later passed to the Bonnick family.

=== Hartridge (Hartridge Manor) Mill, Cranbrook ===
TQ 774 395 51°07′38″N 0°32′10″E

This was a corn mill. In the mid nineteenth century it was worked in conjunction with the Union Mill, the miller being Mr Russell. The mill building was standing in 1974, devoid of machinery. It probably had a breast shot waterwheel.^{B}

=== Paley (Hawkridge) Mill, Cranbrook ===
TQ 777 400 51°07′54″N 0°32′27″E

The mill building was standing in April 1974, devoid of machinery.^{B}

=== Lovehurst Mill, Staplehurst ===
This was a corn mill. John Foreman, farmer, of Horsmonden hired the mill for 14 years in November 1854.

=== Maplehurst Mill, Frittenden ===
TQ 803 416 51°08′42″N 0°34′43″E

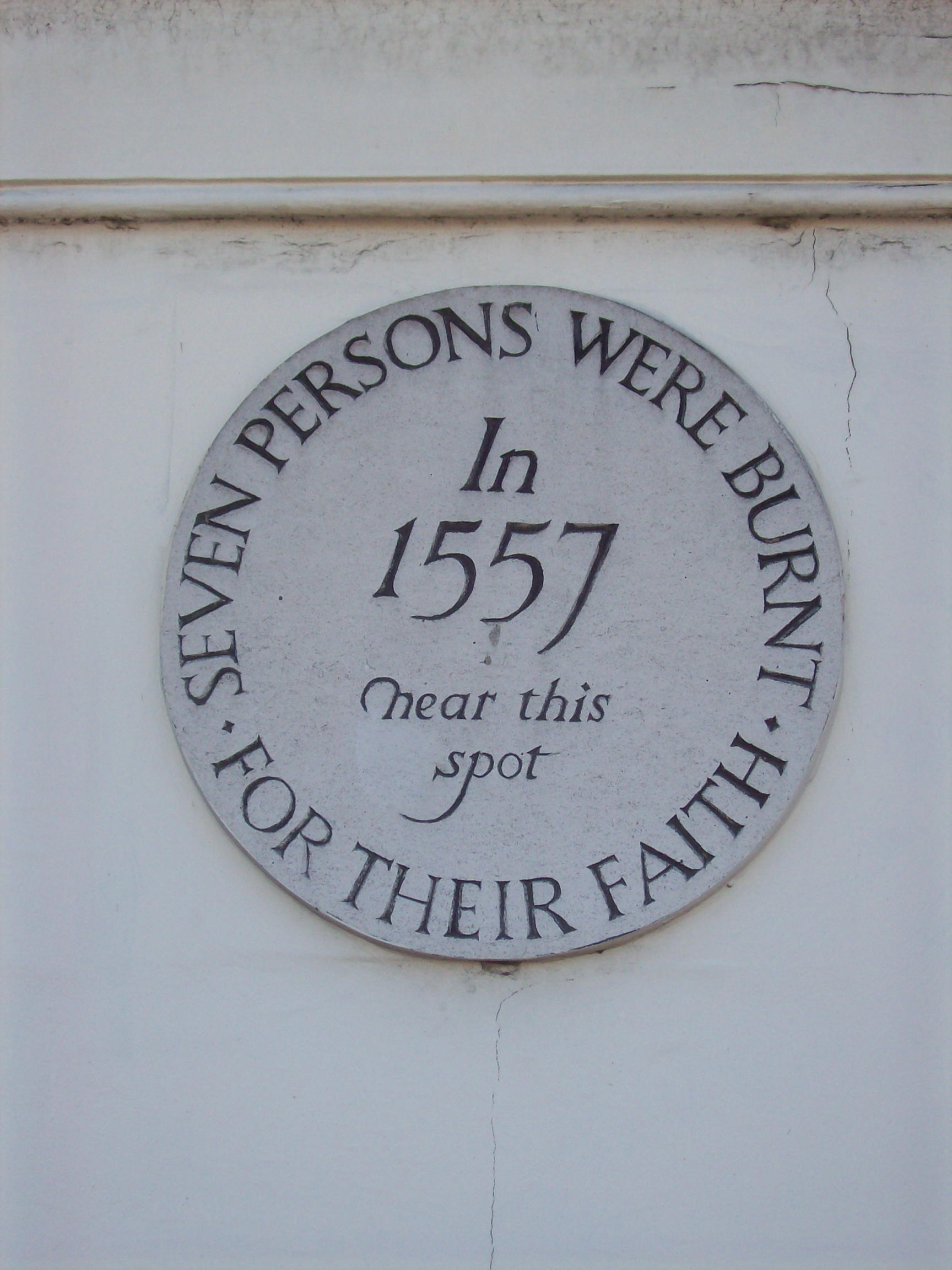
The plaque to the martyrs

This is an old established corn mill site. The mill survives and retains most of its machinery. It has a cast iron overshot wheel driving three pairs of millstones. On 18 June 1557 the miller, William Allin and his wife Katherine were burned at the stake at Fairmeadow, Maidstone, along with five other Protestants. The Allins had fed the poor, sold corn at half price and read scriptures to people. The earliest surviving part of the mill is dated 1756, David Papillon being the then owner. The mill was extended c. 1890, when a steam engine was installed. The original mill building having a peg tile roof with the extension being roofed in slate. The cast iron waterwheel is 10 feet (3.05 m) diameter and 8 feet (2.44 m) wide, mounted on a wooden axle, driving a cast iron pit wheel with 92 wooden cogs. The cast iron wallower has 32 teeth and is carried on a wooden upright shaft, driving a cast iron Great Spur Wheel with 120 cogs. This drove three pairs of millstones. The stones are two pairs of 48 inches (1.22 m) diameter Peak stones and one pair of 44 inches (1.12 m) diameter French Burr stones by Hughes of Dover & London. The Crown Wheel is cast iron, with 18 teeth, it drove a total four layshafts which drove several machines including a smutter and a Feltons Patent American Grist Mill. The mill stands on the parish boundary of Frittenden and Staplehurst, with the majority of the mill in the former parish. It was working until the winter of 1947–8, when the machinery was damaged through being iced up.^{B}^{,}^{C}

== Tributary of the Angley Brook ==
A tributary of the above stream flows into the pond of Hartridge mill. It powered a mill downstream of Mad Dog Shaw.

== Hammer Stream (Beult tributary) ==
The Hammer Stream powered watermills at:

=== Hammer Mill, Biddenden ===
This was the most easterly iron furnace in the Weald. In the time of Queen Elizabeth I it was in the ownership of Sir Richard Butler. The mill was replaced by a corn mill in the mid seventeenth century. The Hammer Pond formerly extended to 30 acres (120,000 m^{2}).

=== Hammer Mill (corn), Biddenden ===
TQ 820 383 51°06′54″N 0°36′05″E

This corn mill stands some 200 yards (180 m) south-west of the site of the furnace. The brick mill building is three storeys high, with a slate roof. The overshot waterwheel was 12 feet (3.66 m) diameter and 6 feet (1.83 m) wide, mounted on an 8¼" (207mm) square cast iron axle. It drove a cast iron pit wheel with 88 wooden cogs. This drove a cast iron wallower with 28 teeth mounter on a wooden upright shaft. The cast iron Great Spur Wheel has 128 cogs and drove four pairs of millstone at one time. The three surviving pairs of stones are two pairs of French Burrs and one pair of Peak stones. The Compass-arm Crown Wheel is of all wood construction, and has 48 cogs. It drove a layshaft and the sack hoist. The mill last worked for trade in 1928, a Mr Hall being the last miller.^{B}

=== Bettenham Mill ===
The site of this mill was marked by Mill Field and Millpond Field on the 1840 tithe map.

== Tributary of the Hammer Stream ==
A stream rises at Sissinghurst and flows into the Hammer Stream downstream of Hammer Mill, Biddenden. it runs for 7 miles (11 km) passing through Sissinghurst and Frittenden and then joins the River Beult at Headcorn. It powered a watermill:

=== New Mill, Sissinghurst ===
TQ 802 381 51°06′49″N 0°34′32″E

This mill was mentioned in rate books of 1687 and 1689.

== Crane Brook (Hammer Stream tributary) ==
The Crane Brook rises at Hartley, it powered a number of mills before joining the Hammer Stream at Biddenden.

=== Upper Mill, Cranbrook ===
This mill stood in the area now known as "The Bottoms". The Upper Pond is mentioned in 1503, and in 1545 Thomas Roberts granted a lease to Thomas Burgess of Cranbrooke of the "uppermost mmyll ponde"—information given in the lease suggests that the Upper Mill was a fulling mill then.

=== Anthony's Mill, Cranbrook ===
This mill was mentioned in 1416 and again in 1447, its location being in Mellane (Mill Lane). In 1464 a rental entry mentions "Anthony's Mill Pond.

=== fulling mill, Cranbrook ===
This was located near the present day Moat Farm. The mill pond would have been some 10 acres (40,000 m^{2}) in area. It was most likely a fulling mill.

=== Sissinghurst Mill ===
The site of this mill is occupied by the present day Lake Chad. In the early 17th century the millers were Francis Chittenden (1634) followed by John Chittenden (1654–69). The mill was a corn mill.

=== Karckeregge Mill ===
The first mention of this mill was in 1353 when the mill was leased. John Bettenham was the lessee in 1416, being the son of Stephen Bettenham. The mill was leased to Peter Courtnope in 1451 and again in 1472, by then probably a fulling mill. The land the mill stood on now forms part of Plumers Farm.

=== Branden Mill ===
A long lost mill site, probably a fulling mill.

== Tributary of the Crane Brook ==
A tributary of the Crane Brook rises at Swattenden, it powered five mills, including those at:

=== The Freight, Cranbrook ===
A fulling mill.

=== Bakers Cross, Cranbrook ===
This fulling mill at Baker's Cross was first mentioned in 1500 as "Hancock's Mill". It may have been a fulling mill or a corn mill then. In 1516 it had been replaced by "Thomas Sheffe's new fulling mill". The mill seems to have ceased working by 1604, when a dyehouse was in use at the site.

== Further tributary of the Crane Brook ==
A tributary of the Crane Brook flows through the town. It powered:

=== Hatmill, Cranbrook ===
TQ 779 356 51°05′33″N 0°32′23″E

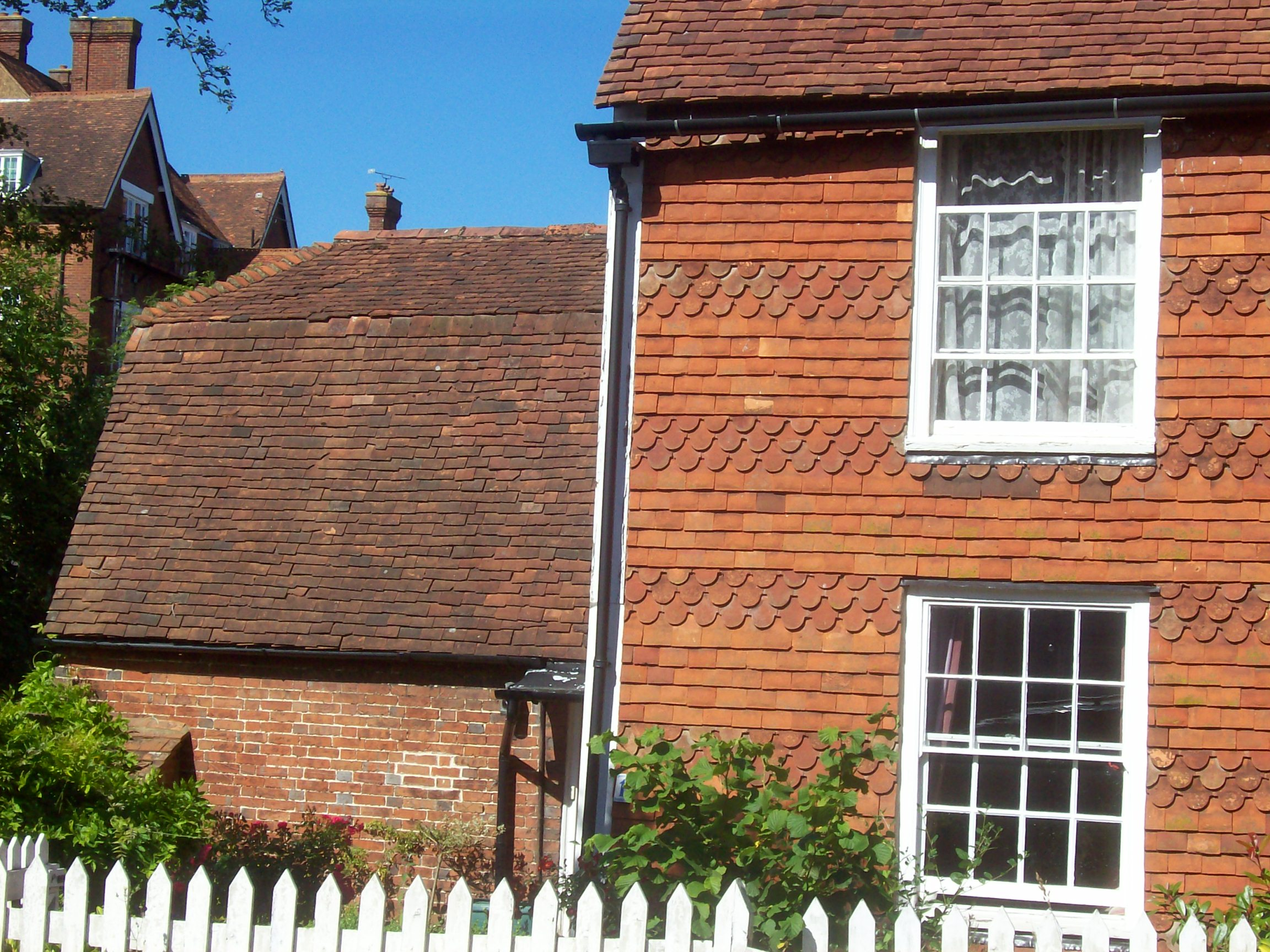
Hatmill

John Tooth bought a house in Stone Street, Cranbrook in the late eighteenth century. he built a small factory at the back of this house in which he made hats. It was powered by a small waterwheel. The building survives today as a private house.

== Stream at Ulcombe ==
A stream rises at Ulcombe and flows into the beult at Hawkenbury. It powered a watermill.

=== Upper Mill, Ulcombe ===
This was probably the Domesday mill recorded at Ulcombe. Chegworth mill was also known as Lower Mill thus this mill would be the Upper Mill.

== Stream at Chart Sutton (Beult tributary) ==
A stream rises at Chart Sutton and flows into the Beult at Cross At Hand. It powered a watermill.

=== Chart Mill, Chart Sutton ===
TQ 794 493 51°12′53″N 0°34′11″E

This mill is a timber framed mill on a single storey brick base. The waterwheel was some 24 feet (7.32 m) diameter and 4 feet (1.22 m) wide, it was removed during World War Two. The cast iron axle is 9 inches (230 mm) square, and bears the legend "WEEKS & SON, MAIDSTONE 1875" on one face. No other machinery is known to exist in the mill, the lower floor having been filled with concrete when the mill was converted, the upper floors being used as an office.^{B}

== Sources ==
- ^A = Reid, Kenneth (1987). "Chapter 10". Watermills of the London Countryside, Vol 1. Cheddar, Somerset, UK: Charles Skilton Ltd. ISBN 0-284-39165-4.
- ^B = Fuller & Spain (1986). Watermills (Kent and the Borders of Sussex). Maidstone: Kent Archaeological Society. ISBN 0-906746-08-6.
- ^C = Coles Finch, William (1933). Watermills & Windmills. London WC1: C W Daniel Company.
- ^D = F C Clark (1947). Kentish Fire. Rye, Sussex: Adams & Son. pp. Chapter 6.
