= Listed buildings in Platt, Kent =

Civil Parish in Kent, England

Platt is a village and civil parish in the Tonbridge and Malling district of Kent, England. It contains 30 listed buildings that are recorded in the National Heritage List for England. Of these two are grade II* and 28 are grade II.

This list is based on the information retrieved online from Historic England.

== Key ==
| Grade | Criteria |
|---|---|
| I | Buildings that are of exceptional interest |
| II* | Particularly important buildings of more than special interest |
| II | Buildings that are of special interest |

== Listing ==
| Name | Grade | Location | Type | Completed (Note: The date given is the date used by Historic England as significant for the initial building or that of an important part in the structure's description.) | Date designated | Grid ref. (Note: The grid reference is based on the British national grid reference system, sometimes known as OSGB36, used by the Ordnance Survey.) Geo-coordinates | Notes | Entry number (Note: The "List Entry Number" is a unique number assigned to each listed building and scheduled monument by Historic England.) | Image | Wikidata |
|---|---|---|---|---|---|---|---|---|---|---|
| Forge Cottages | II | 2 and 4, Basted Lane, Crouch | | | 3 May 1984 | TQ6182855590; 51°16′35″N 0°19′07″E | | 1281300 | Upload Photo | Q26570361 |
| High Crouch | II | Basted Lane, Crouch | | | 1 August 1952 | TQ6175655553; 51°16′34″N 0°19′04″E | | 1362380 | Upload Photo | Q26644274 |
| Winfield House | II | Basted Lane, Crouch | | | 3 May 1984 | TQ6155655588; 51°16′36″N 0°18′53″E | | 1204254 | Upload Photo | Q26499719 |
| Cobblestones the Homestead the Red Cottage | II | Boneashe Lane | | | 1 August 1952 | TQ6247756762; 51°17′13″N 0°19′43″E | | 1071985 | Upload Photo | Q26327372 |
| Holmes | II | Boneashe Lane | | | 1 August 1952 | TQ6256656749; 51°17′12″N 0°19′47″E | | 1204267 | Upload Photo | Q26499732 |
| Captain's Walk | II | 1-4, Church Road | | | 3 May 1984 | TQ6221157043; 51°17′22″N 0°19′30″E | | 1071986 | Upload Photo | Q26327373 |
| Church of St Mary | II | Church Road | church building | | 25 August 1959 | TQ6223557018; 51°17′21″N 0°19′31″E | | 1204270 | Church of St Mary More images | Q26499735 |
| Glebe House | II | Comp Lane | | | 3 May 1984 | TQ6232656918; 51°17′18″N 0°19′35″E | | 1071987 | Upload Photo | Q26327375 |
| Great Comp | II* | Comp Lane | | | 1 August 1952 | TQ6319156760; 51°17′12″N 0°20′20″E | | 1071988 | Upload Photo | Q17546831 |
| The Hopfield | II | Comp Lane | | | 19 March 1981 | TQ6269756891; 51°17′17″N 0°19′54″E | | 1281277 | Upload Photo | Q26570337 |
| Nepicar Cottage | II | London Road | | | 3 May 1984 | TQ6285458370; 51°18′04″N 0°20′05″E | | 1204323 | Upload Photo | Q26499781 |
| Nepicar House | II* | London Road | | | 1 August 1952 | TQ6290658345; 51°18′03″N 0°20′08″E | | 1071991 | Upload Photo | Q17546835 |
| Nepicar Lodge | II | London Road | | | 3 May 1984 | TQ6302658363; 51°18′04″N 0°20′14″E | | 1204298 | Upload Photo | Q26499759 |
| Outbuilding 10 Yards to North of Nepicar House | II | London Road | | | 20 December 1977 | TQ6286858385; 51°18′05″N 0°20′06″E | | 1071992 | Upload Photo | Q26327379 |
| Barn 13 Metres to the South of Oak Beams | II | Long Mill Lane, TN15 8NA | | | 3 May 1984 | TQ6225456632; 51°17′09″N 0°19′31″E | | 1281240 | Upload Photo | Q26570304 |
| Crouch Farmhouse | II | Long Mill Lane | | | 3 May 1984 | TQ6183755830; 51°16′43″N 0°19′08″E | | 1281283 | Upload Photo | Q26570343 |
| Dales | II | Long Mill Lane | | | 1 August 1952 | TQ6223456677; 51°17′10″N 0°19′30″E | | 1204378 | Upload Photo | Q26499830 |
| Kelvin Laurelcott Little Laurelcott | II | Long Mill Lane | | | 3 May 1984 | TQ6217357025; 51°17′21″N 0°19′28″E | | 1071989 | Upload Photo | Q26327376 |
| Moorlands Cottage | II | Long Mill Lane | | | 3 May 1984 | TQ6186255472; 51°16′31″N 0°19′09″E | | 1071990 | Upload Photo | Q26327378 |
| Oak Beams | II | Long Mill Lane, TN15 8NA | | | 3 May 1984 | TQ6224556648; 51°17′09″N 0°19′31″E | | 1071993 | Upload Photo | Q26327381 |
| Platt Farmhouse | II | Long Mill Lane | | | 1 August 1952 | TQ6226156585; 51°17′07″N 0°19′31″E | | 1204327 | Upload Photo | Q26499785 |
| Platt Oast | II | Long Mill Lane | | | 3 May 1984 | TQ6226256610; 51°17′08″N 0°19′32″E | | 1362381 | Upload Photo | Q26644275 |
| Rose Cottage | II | Long Mill Lane | | | 3 May 1984 | TQ6226456704; 51°17′11″N 0°19′32″E | | 1362382 | Upload Photo | Q26644276 |
| Fir Tree Cottages | II | 1 and 2, Maidstone Road | | | 3 May 1984 | TQ6178157232; 51°17′28″N 0°19′08″E | | 1204389 | Upload Photo | Q26499838 |
| Stone Cottage | II | Maidstone Road | | | 3 May 1984 | TQ6181257231; 51°17′28″N 0°19′09″E | | 1071994 | Upload Photo | Q26327382 |
| Grooms Cottage | II | Mill Lane, Basted | | | 3 May 1984 | TQ6071855888; 51°16′46″N 0°18′11″E | | 1071995 | Upload Photo | Q26327384 |
| Farm Building 30 Yards North East of Pigeon's Green Farmhouse | II | Potash Lane | | | 3 May 1984 | TQ6253156722; 51°17′11″N 0°19′46″E | | 1072677 | Upload Photo | Q26328496 |
| Farm Building 30 Yards to West of Pigeon's Green Farmhouse | II | Potash Lane, TN15 8NL | | | 3 May 1984 | TQ6249556704; 51°17′11″N 0°19′44″E | | 1072678 | Upload Photo | Q26328499 |
| Patchways | II | Potash Lane | | | 3 May 1984 | TQ6246056709; 51°17′11″N 0°19′42″E | | 1072697 | Upload Photo | Q26328538 |
| Pigeon's Green Farmhouse | II | Potash Lane | | | 3 May 1984 | TQ6252756700; 51°17′11″N 0°19′45″E | | 1362058 | Upload Photo | Q26643991 |

== See also ==
- Grade I listed buildings in Kent
- Grade II* listed buildings in Kent

== Sources ==
- Newman, John (2012) [1969], Kent: West and the Weald, The Buildings of England, New Haven and London: Yale University Press, ISBN 978-0-300-18509-6
