= Coull Quartet =

English string quartet, founded 1974

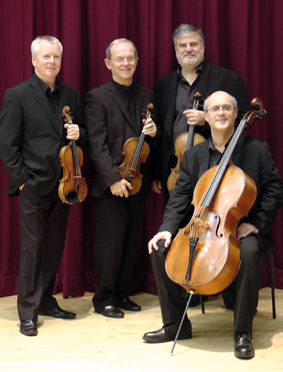

Background information
- Years active: 1974
- Members: Roger Coull (first violin); Philip Gallaway (second violin); Jonathan Barritt (viola); Nicholas Roberts (cello)
- Past members: Rose Redgrave (viola, –2014); Gustav Clarkson (viola, –2009); David Curtis (viola, –2004); John Todd (cello, –2000); Martin Thomas (cello, –1985)

The Coull Quartet is an English string quartet that was founded at the Royal Academy of Music, London in 1974 under the guidance of renowned quartet leader, Sidney Griller. They were appointed Quartet-in-Residence by the University of Warwick in 1977. The Quartet, which includes two of its founder members, has performed and broadcast extensively throughout the UK, and has made tours of Western Europe, the Americas, Australia, China, India and the Far East.

Since the mid-1980s the Coull Quartet has made over 30 recordings featuring a wide selection of the repertoire from the complete Mendelssohn and Schubert quartets to 20th century and contemporary British chamber music. Their CD of quartets by Maw and Britten on the Somm label was also described as the ‘Benchmark Recording’ by BBC Music Magazine in addition to being featured in ‘Editor’s Choice’ in The Gramophone.

Their list of commissions includes works by Peter Seabourne, Sally Beamish, Edward Cowie, Joe Cutler, David Matthews, Nicholas Maw, and Robert Simpson. These include string quartets, quintets with piano or wind player, works with solo voice or choir, and even a piece for quartet and table tennis players!

The Quartet regularly plays in the Great Comp Music Festival in Kent during summer classical music festivals. They played on 5, 12 and 18 September 2010 (after the death of Roderick Cameron, founder of Great Comp Garden).
