= Medway watermills =

Watermills of the River Medway

The Medway and its tributaries and sub-tributaries have been used for over 1,150 years as a source of power. There are over two hundred sites where the use of water power is known. These uses included corn milling, fulling, paper making, iron smelting, pumping water, making gunpowder, vegetable oil extraction, and electricity generation. Today, there is just one watermill working for trade. Those that remain have mostly been converted. Such conversions include a garage, dwellings, restaurants, museums and a wedding venue. Some watermills are mere derelict shells, lower walls or lesser remains. Of the majority, there is nothing to be seen.

== Watermills ==
The River Medway powered a number of watermills. From source to mouth they were:

=== Fen Place (Bishes) Mill, Worth ===
TQ 361 366 51°06′45″N 0°03′17″W The mill building survives in part, incorporated into a dwelling and retaining the waterwheel. The site may have been a hammer mill, witnessed by Ironmasters Cottage Wing mentioned in recent property sale particulars. The mill was known as Bishes Mill in 1598 John Awcock was the miller in 1841 and John Stanbridge was the miller in 1851, still there in 1867. The mill was then a corn mill.^{A}

=== Mill Place Foundry, East Grinstead ===
Another gun foundry site.

=== Brambletye (Castle) Mill, Forest Row. ===
TQ 4168 3527 51°05′55″N 0°01′26″E A Domesday site, the last mill building dated from 1866, replacing the previous building that had burnt down. It had a brick base with timber above. The wooden overshot waterwheel drove three pairs of millstones. Although the mill was working in 1945 it had been demolished by 1968.^{A}

=== Tablehurst Mill, Forest Row ===
TQ 450 352 51°05′52″N 0°04′18″E This mill was a mainly sixteenth-century building. It is most likely to be the "Tellhurst Mill" that J. M. W. Turner sketched c.1795. It had two overshot waterwheels in tandem, with all wooden machinery. The mill ceased working in 1925 and had been demolished by 1936.^{A}

=== Parrock Forge, Hartfield ===
TQ 458 357 51°06′07″N 0°05′00″E This forge was active during the reign of Henry VIII, when it was making "gunstones of iron". His Majesty was in arrears with payments for munitions supplied, leading to financial trouble for the ironmaster in 1530. Robert Scorer was the lessee in 1513, when it was owned by William Warner, the forge was sold to William Saunders in 1547. In 1574 the forge was owned by Lord Buckhurst and worked by George Bullen. In 1595, the Crown Gunfounder, Thomas Johnson was involved in a dispute here. At the time the forge was owned by William Garway, and is last recorded in the ownership of John Garway in 1600. The dam is recorded as 70 metres (77 yd) long and up to 1.5 metres (4 ft 11 in) high, although there is some evidence that it could have been as much as 270 metres (300 yd) long.

=== Hartfield Iron Mill ===
This forge was in existence in 1496, when its owner Thomas Wildgoose made his will. Its probable location was below Chartners Farm (square TQ4736).

=== Ashurst Mill ===
TQ 506 389 51°07′46″N 0°09′12″E This mill was a corn mill. The last building was built c.1780. The mill was run for many years by the Everest & then the Caffyn families. John Everest was the Miller at the time of his death in 1790 when he was succeeded, in accordance with his will, by his eldest son Edward. The latter continued milling here until his death in 1831 when he left the mill, in his will, to his sons John & James. The Everests were still there at the time of the 1841 Census. Thomas Caffyn was the miller in 1851. New machinery was installed in 1887 at a cost of over £1,000. The mill was being run by Thomas Caffyn (son of 1851 Thomas), when it burnt down in September 1930. The waterwheel was 16 feet (4.88 m) diameter by 7 feet 8 inches (2.34 m) wide.^{A}

=== Ashurst Furnace ===
TQ 507 390 51°07′49″N 0°09′17″E This furnace stood just downstream of Ashurst Mill. It was operating between 1574 and 1599. It was owned by someone by the name of Stace in 1574, Sir Walter Waller in 1588–90 (occupied by John Phillips) and in 1599 Thomas Browne sold cannon here.

=== Chafford Mills, Fordcombe ===
This was a paper mill. There were two mills here in the thirteenth century, separated by a ford that passed through the tail race of the Upper Mill. The Upper Mill was removed c.1300 and as a result the ford became deep and impassable. In 1303, Henry de Cobham built a bridge at his own cost to replace the ford. This was swept away by a storm in 1337 and Thomas de Cobham (his son), erected a footbridge in its place. The Sheriff proceeded against Thomas for not rebuilding the bridge in its original form, and the Court agreed with the Sheriff. The site was used at one time as a fulling mill. A picture of the mill c.1850 can be seen here. Paper from Chafford Mills was used to print postage stamps for Jamaica, The Transvaal and the Falkland Islands. The mill closed in 1913 and was demolished in 1930. It was latterly driven by a turbine.^{A}

=== Pound Mill, Penshurst ===
This mill stood below Ford Place Farm. It was a corn mill powered by an overshot waterwheel.^{A}

=== Ensfield Mill ===
A long lost mill site. An agreement between Tonbridge Priory and the bishop of Rochester in 1353 mentions a mill at "Yenesfield" - the present day Ensfield Farm.^{A}

=== Ramhurst Mill, Leigh ===
TQ 566 463 51°11′38″N 0°14′31″E In the 1428 will of Sir Thomas Colepeper it is referred to as the mill of Greenerssh. The mill was marked on a map dated 1579. The mill was marked as Crenhurst Mill on a map of 1769. Ramshurst Mill was marked on the 1801 Ordnance Survey map, but not on Greenwoods map dated 1821. In 1851, Henry Morgan was a millwright living at Ramhurst Mills, Leigh.^{A}

=== Powder Mills, Leigh (Tunbridge Gunpowder Works) ===
TQ 573 466 51°11′49″N 0°15′08″E This was a gunpowder mill, established in 1811 by John Children and William Burton of Tonbridge. William was the brother of Decimus Burton. The Powder Mills cost £30,000 to set up. Humphry Davy was also involved at the start, but he soon withdrew. The Children family sold out to the Burton at the end of 1812. William Ford Burton managing the mills. In the early 1820s the Burton family bought the land, which had been leased initially. The site was known as the Tunbridge Gunpowder Works. In 1834, Thomas Wells of Powder Mills died and was buried at Penshurst. Three explosions were recorded in the years 1832-35, the last killing two people. In 1837, there were four mills, each taking water from the same pond. The available head of water was some 13 feet (3.96 m), and the waterwheels were breastshot. Another explosion occurred in 1845, without loss of life. William Burton died in 1859, and the mills were put up for sale. They were bought by Charles and Thomas Curtis for £10,000. An explosion on 6 July 1864 killed four people. The firm was called Curtis's and Harvey by 1874. In this year, the transport of gunpowder along the River Medway ceased owing to the inhabitants of Maidstone fearing for their safety from the passage of the barges along the river. In 1878, there was an explosion that killed a man. Steam power having been added by this date. The mills were reworked in 1885 when another explosion killed a man. Cordite was being produced by this time and the manufacture of gunpowder ceased by 1897. Curtis's and Harvey became a public company in 1898. There was a tramway system around the site, probably introduced in 1885. The gauge was some 23 inches (580 mm). No locomotives were worked, all propulsion being by manual labour. An explosion in 1917 was caused by a lightning strike. After World War I, production was cut back, and Curtis's and Harveys had become part of Explosives Trade Ltd, which became Nobel Industries Ltd in 1920. Nobel Industries became part of Imperial Chemical Industries. Another explosion in 1927 killed several people. Production ceased in 1934, with the manufacturing of explosives being transferred to Ardeer in Scotland. Many of the buildings were burnt down. In 1942, the site was bought by T G East and Son, and developed as a small pharmaceutical works. In 1952, the site came into the ownership of Smith Kline and French, which later became Smith Kline Beecham and then Glaxo Smith Kline. The site is now used for pharmaceutical research and is still known as Powder Mills to this day.

=== Town Mill, Tonbridge ===
TQ 596 467 51°11′50″N 0°17′07″E An old corn mill site. The mill house survives along with a few walls of the mill, which had a breastshot waterwheel.^{A} In 2006 Tonbridge Civic Society gave an award to a new-build house that incorporated the mill remains.

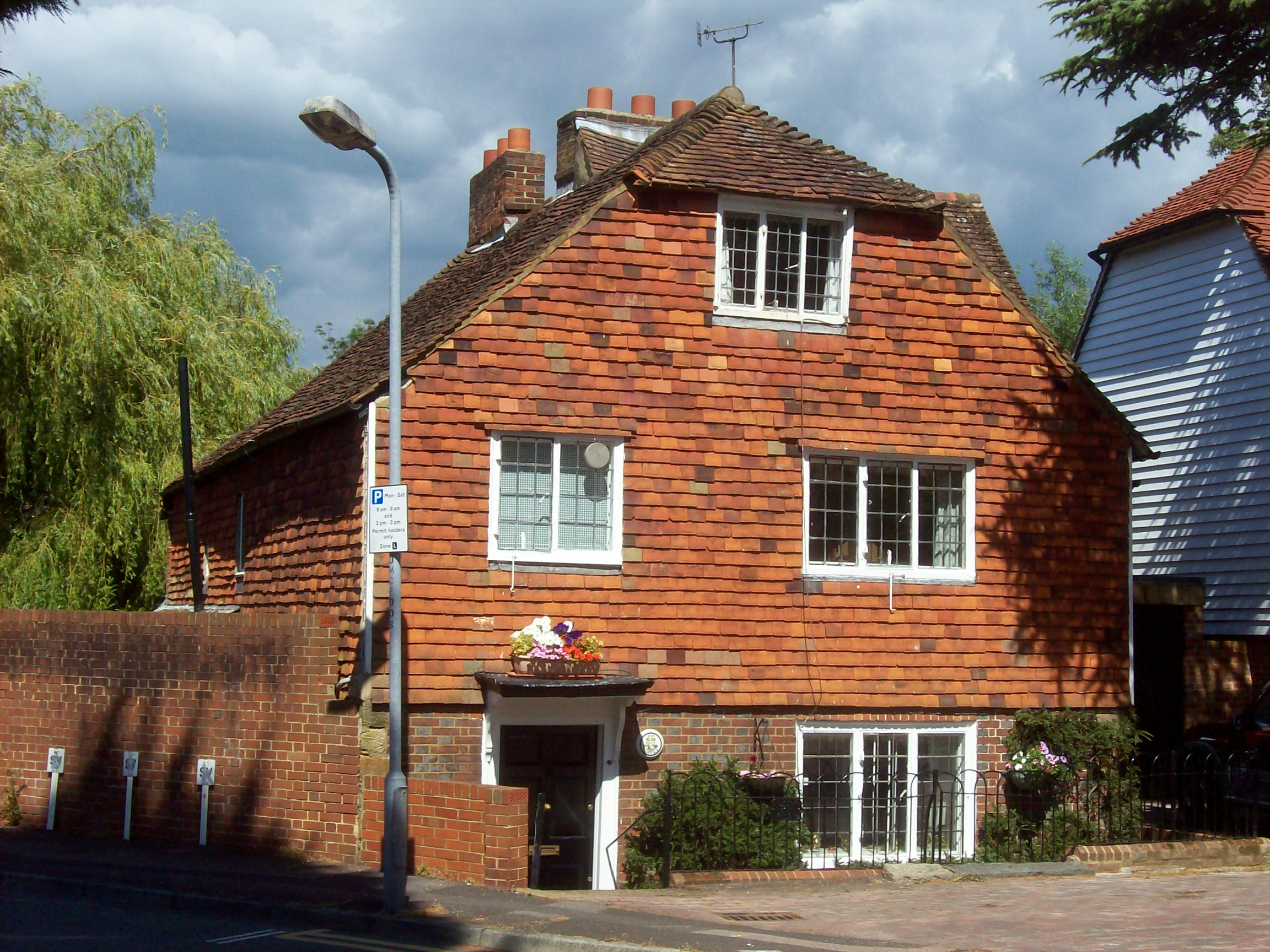
The Mill House

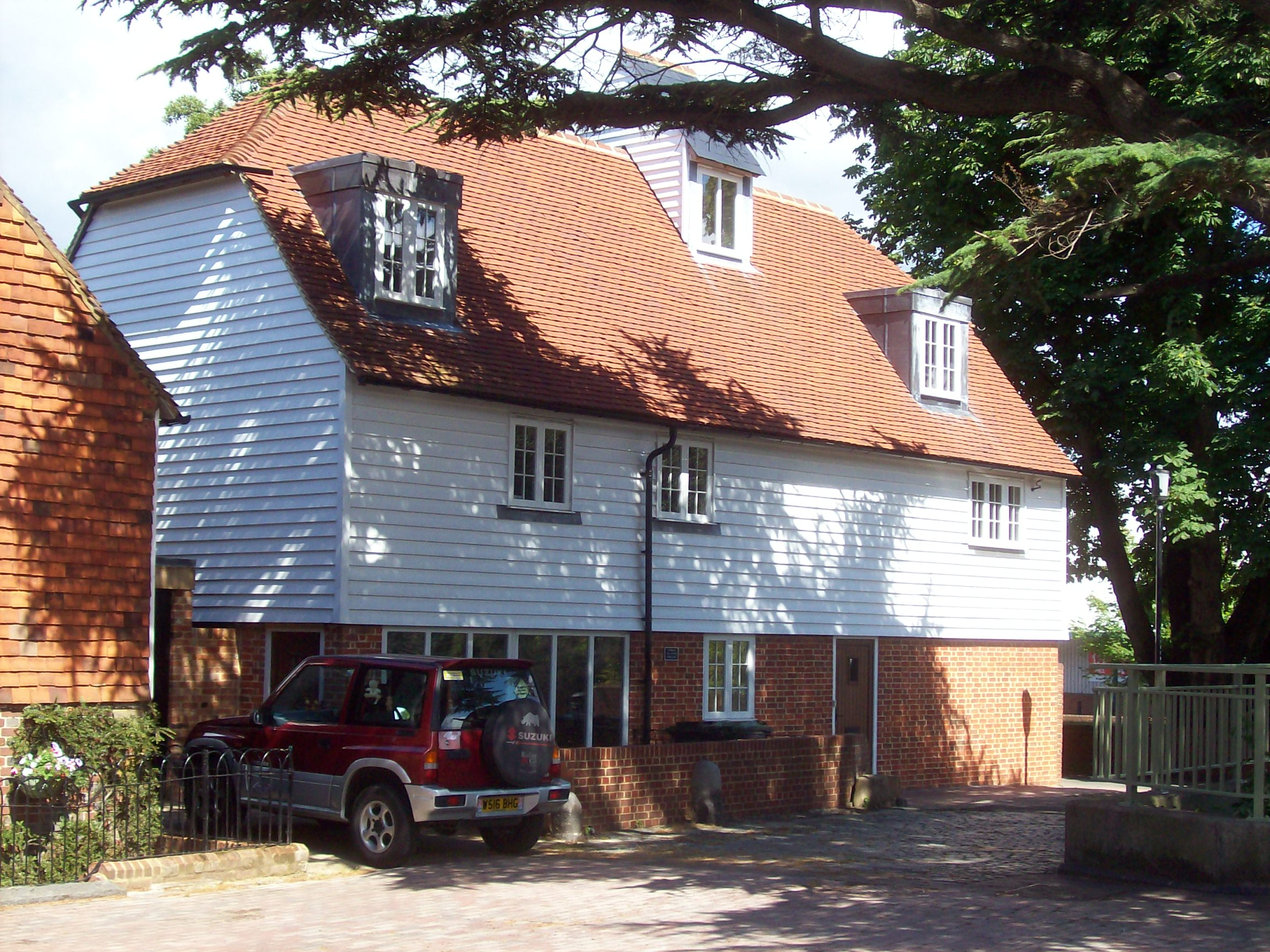
The new building on the old walls

=== Branbridges Mill, East Peckham ===
TQ 673 485 51°12′40″N 0°23′46″E This mill was known as "Brantbridge Mill" in 1538, being then valued at £2.6s.8d., owned by Sir Thomas Wyatt. In later years it was run by the Arnold family, who were previously at Bartley Mill, Frant. They took the mill in 1890, and the mill was marked as an oil mill on that year's 25" Ordnance Survey map. The waterwheel was replaced by a turbine, then that was replaced by a gas engine, in turn being replaced by an oil engine. Flour production ceased c.1917 and provender milling ceased c.1947. The mill was burnt down in the 1960s.^{A}

=== Hampstead Mill, Yalding ===
TQ 688 501 approx 51°13′30″N 0°25′06″E One of two Domesday sites in Yalding, this was a paper mill in 1872. The site was first used as a chemical works just before the First World War, and eventually became part of ICI.^{A}

=== Friars Mill, Aylesford ===
This was a corn mill, serving Aylesford Friary.^{A}

=== Borstal Mill ===
An old tide mill site. The mill was the property of the See of Rochester in 1323, being rebuilt by Hamo de Hethe in that year.^{A}

=== Cuxton Mill. ===
This was a tide mill.^{A}

=== Priory Mill, Rochester ===
This was a tide mill. It stood at the end of George Lane near the town walls. The mill was demolished in the seventeenth century.^{A}

=== Strood Tide Mill ===
TQ 740 690 51°23′36″N 0°29′59″E The site of this mill is marked by Water Mill Wharf, north of the railway bridge. It belonged to Temple Strood Manor and in the mid-fourteenth century contained "two water mills under one roof". An engraving by S & N Buck dated 1721 shows the mill, and it appears in "A Distant View of Rochester and Chatham" by Joshua Farington, RA, in 1790. A sketch by W H Reynolds shows the mill in greater detail, and was done at a later date. The mill had two undershot waterwheels and was valued in the Church Rate Books of 1764 at £64.1s.1d. Latterly a steam engine was installed to enable the mill to work for longer periods.^{A} The mill was demolished in 1858. Latterly it drove five pairs of millstones, one wheel worked two pairs of French Burr stones and one pair of Peak stones. The other wheel worked two pairs of French Burr stones, wheat cleaners, flour dressers and the sack hoist.

=== Chatham Tide Mill ===
TQ 757 683 51°23′12″N 0°31′25″E There was a tide mill marked on 1575/1610 maps of the Brook area of Chatham, where the Old Bourne River entered the Medway. By 1765, the Mill is not on the map and the river had been canalised, running alongside the road known as the Brook, and soon after it had been culverted.

== Watermills on the tributaries ==
The vast majority of the watermills were on the tributaries. The watermills on the tributaries feeding in above Penshurst are covered in the upper tributaries article, while those watermills on the tributaries feeding in between Penshurst and Yalding are covered in the middle tributaries article. Those on the tributaries feeding in below Yalding are covered in the lower tributaries article.

== Sources ==
^A = Reid, Kenneth (1987). "Chapter 10". Watermills of the London Countryside, Vol 1. Cheddar, Somerset, UK: Charles Skilton Ltd. ISBN 0-284-39165-4.
