= Platt, Kent =

Village in Kent, England

Coordinates: 51.289°N 0.325°E

Platt
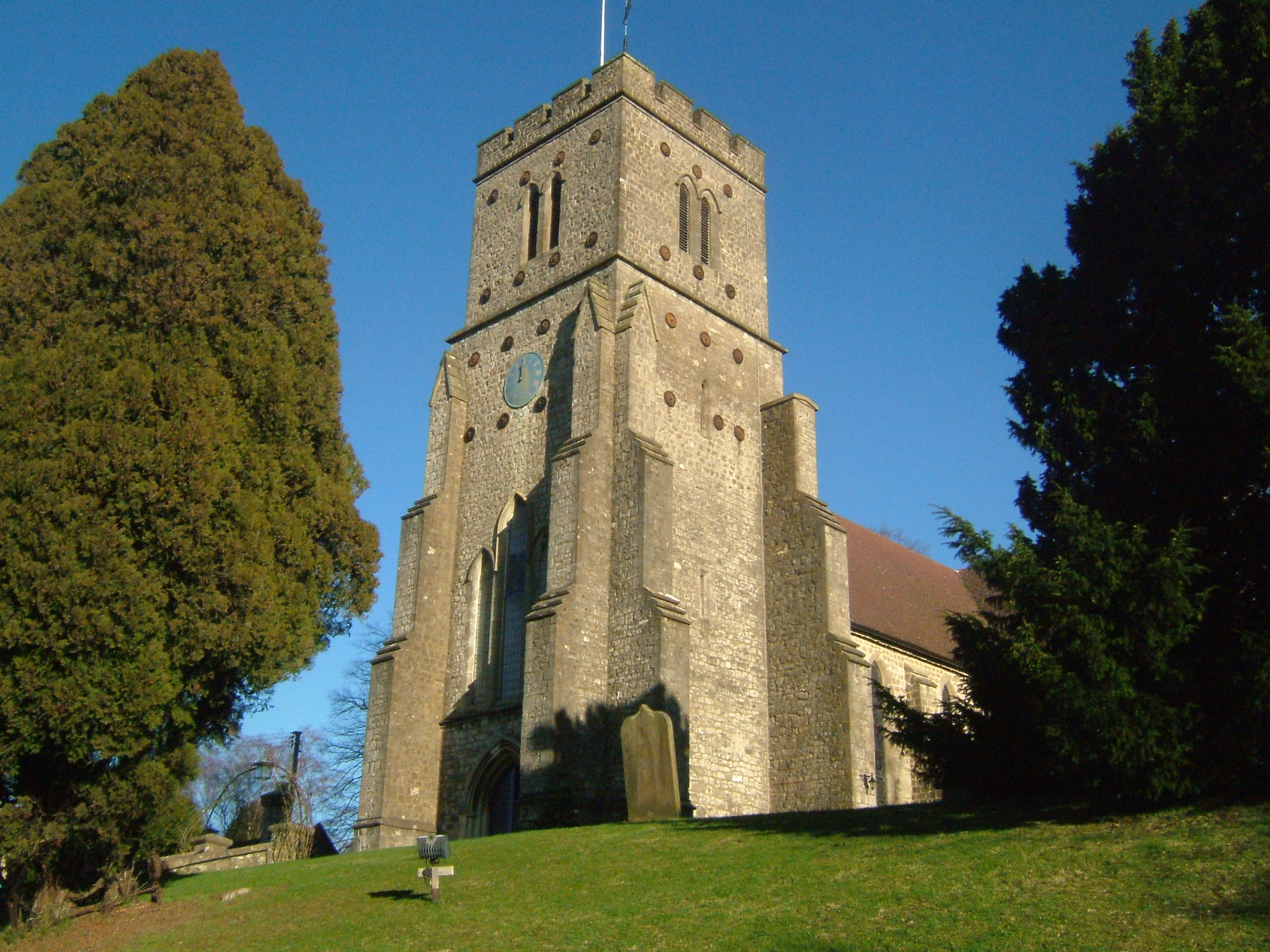
- St Mary's Church

- Location within Kent
- Population: 1,679 (2011 Census)
- OS grid reference: TQ622570
- District: Tonbridge and Malling
- Shire county: Kent
- Region: South East
- Country: England
- Sovereign state: United Kingdom
- Post town: Sevenoaks
- Postcode district: TN15
- Police: Kent
- Fire: Kent
- Ambulance: South East Coast
- UK Parliament: Tonbridge

Platt, or St. Mary's Platt is a village and civil parish in the local government district of Tonbridge and Malling in Kent, England.

== Geography, history and notable residents ==
The hamlet of Crouch (pronounced Crooch) lies within the parish. The River Bourne flows through the western part of the parish. Basted paper mill was within the parish boundary.

The Anglican parish church of St Mary's dates from 1843 and stands on a hill overlooking the village centre. The architects were Whichcord and Walker of Maidstone.

BBC broadcaster Adam Curtis grew up in Platt. The broadcaster James Whale was a resident. The comedian Jo Brand attended Platt primary school. The actor Richard Hearne, who lived at the 15th-century Platt Farm on Long Mill Lane from the 1940s, is buried in the churchyard.

== Sport ==
The village is home to Platt United Football Club (often known as Platt Utd FC), a grassroots association football club established in the 1920s. Over its history, the club has competed in regional and district competitions including the Sevenoaks and District Football League, the Kent County Football League, and the West Kent Sunday League, as well as the Sevenoaks Charity Cup.

== See also ==
- Listed buildings in Platt, Kent
