= Listed buildings in Tonbridge =

Non-Civil Parish in Kent, England

Tonbridge is an un-parished town in Kent, England. It contains 115 listed buildings that are recorded in the National Heritage List for England. Of these one is grade I, four are grade II* and 110 are grade II.

This list is based on the information retrieved online from Historic England.

== Key ==
Grade	Criteria
I	Buildings that are of exceptional interest
II*	Particularly important buildings of more than special interest
II	Buildings that are of special interest

== Listing ==
Name	Grade	Location	Type	Completed (Note: The date given is the date used by Historic England as significant for the initial building or that of an important part in the structure's description.)	Date designated	Grid ref. (Note: The grid reference is based on the British national grid reference system, sometimes known as OSGB36, used by the Ordnance Survey.) Geo-coordinates	Notes	Entry number (Note: The "List Entry Number" is a unique number assigned to each listed building and scheduled monument by Historic England.)	Image	Wikidata
Tonbridge Castle	I				8 May 1950	TQ5897446602; 51°11′47″N 0°16′26″E		1363369	Tonbridge Castle More images	Q7820768
7 and 9, Bank Street	II	7 and 9, Bank Street			20 January 1972	TQ5899246690; 51°11′50″N 0°16′27″E		1069999	7 and 9, Bank Street More images	Q26323492
Bank Street Schools	II	Bank Street			20 January 1972	TQ5900446705; 51°11′51″N 0°16′28″E		1363370	Bank Street Schools More images	Q26645200
The Red House	II	10, Bordyke			8 May 1950	TQ5920946844; 51°11′55″N 0°16′38″E		1070002	Upload Photo	Q26323498
Bordyke House	II	11, Bordyke			8 May 1950	TQ5921946837; 51°11′55″N 0°16′39″E		1363372	Upload Photo	Q26645202
12, Bordyke	II	12, Bordyke			20 January 1972	TQ5923546820; 51°11′54″N 0°16′40″E		1070003	Upload Photo	Q26323500
13 and 14, Bordyke	II	13 and 14, Bordyke			20 January 1972	TQ5924446815; 51°11′54″N 0°16′40″E		1363373	Upload Photo	Q26645203
15, Bordyke	II	15, Bordyke			20 January 1972	TQ5928546770; 51°11′53″N 0°16′42″E		1070004	Upload Photo	Q26323502
7 and 8, Bordyke	II	7 and 8, Bordyke			20 January 1972	TQ5916946873; 51°11′56″N 0°16′36″E		1363371	Upload Photo	Q26645201
The Priory	II	9, Bordyke			8 May 1950	TQ5920046852; 51°11′55″N 0°16′38″E		1070001	Upload Photo	Q26323496
Garden Wall at the Cedars	II	Bordyke			20 January 1972	TQ5921846732; 51°11′51″N 0°16′39″E		1363374	Garden Wall at the Cedars More images	Q26645204
Minerva House Minerva House Annexe	II	Bordyke			20 January 1972	TQ5915746846; 51°11′55″N 0°16′36″E		1070000	Upload Photo	Q26323494
The Cedars	II	Bordyke			20 January 1972	TQ5927746727; 51°11′51″N 0°16′42″E		1070005	Upload Photo	Q26323504
Brook Street Farm House and Adjoining Cottage	II	Brook Street			8 May 1950	TQ5792545607; 51°11′16″N 0°15′30″E		1120932	Upload Photo	Q26414127
1 and 2, Charlton Terrace	II	1 and 2, Charlton Terrace			2 April 1990	TQ5942346779; 51°11′53″N 0°16′49″E		1069956	Upload Photo	Q26323413
Owl House	II	3, Charlton Terrace			2 April 1990	TQ5944146778; 51°11′53″N 0°16′50″E		1252226	Upload Photo	Q26544114
5, Charlton Terrace	II	5, Charlton Terrace			2 April 1990	TQ5945546778; 51°11′53″N 0°16′51″E		1363388	Upload Photo	Q26645216
Tyger's Head	II	1, Church Lane			20 January 1972	TQ5912546747; 51°11′52″N 0°16′34″E		1363375	Tyger's Head More images	Q26645205
Church House (Ymca)	II	Church Lane			8 May 1950	TQ5913746749; 51°11′52″N 0°16′35″E		1070006	Church House (Ymca) More images	Q26323506
Church of St Peter and St Paul	II*	Church Lane			8 May 1950	TQ5917446743; 51°11′52″N 0°16′36″E		1120884	Church of St Peter and St Paul More images	Q17546885
1-5, Church Street	II	1-5, Church Street			20 January 1972	TQ5917746676; 51°11′50″N 0°16′37″E		1363393	1-5, Church Street More images	Q26645221
6-11, Church Street	II	6-11, Church Street			20 January 1972	TQ5917146697; 51°11′50″N 0°16′36″E		1069964	6-11, Church Street More images	Q26323429
4-12, East Street	II	4-12, East Street			20 January 1972	TQ5913846619; 51°11′48″N 0°16′34″E		1363394	4-12, East Street More images	Q26645222
Bordyke End	II	East Street			20 January 1972	TQ5937446721; 51°11′51″N 0°16′47″E		1069967	Upload Photo	Q26323433
Lions, Including Attached Garden Wall to East	II	East Street			2 February 2002	TQ5920346602; 51°11′47″N 0°16′38″E		1389386	Upload Photo	Q26668823
The Hermitage	II	East Street			8 May 1950	TQ5928546676; 51°11′50″N 0°16′42″E		1363395	Upload Photo	Q26645223
The Man of Kent Public House	II	East Street			20 January 1972	TQ5915546621; 51°11′48″N 0°16′35″E		1069965	The Man of Kent Public House More images	Q26323431
The Old Methodist Church	II	East Street			7 July 1989	TQ5912246603; 51°11′47″N 0°16′34″E		1069957	The Old Methodist Church More images	Q26323415
The Port Reeve's House	II*	East Street			8 May 1950	TQ5923746628; 51°11′48″N 0°16′40″E		1069966	The Port Reeve's House More images	Q17546742
Cape Cottage	II	2, Hadlow Road			20 January 1972	TQ5939046743; 51°11′52″N 0°16′48″E		1363396	Upload Photo	Q26645224
Blue Door	II	4-8, Hadlow Road			4 December 1996	TQ5940946783; 51°11′53″N 0°16′49″E		1259582	Upload Photo	Q26550681
Great Fish Hall	II	Hadlow Road			8 May 1950	TQ6174647992; 51°12′30″N 0°18′51″E		1069970	Upload Photo	Q26323440
Little Fish Hall	II	Hadlow Road			8 May 1950	TQ6141947988; 51°12′30″N 0°18′34″E		1069968	Upload Photo	Q26323435
Oasthouses to South East of Little Fish Hall	II	Hadlow Road			20 January 1972	TQ6143047934; 51°12′28″N 0°18′35″E		1069969	Upload Photo	Q26323438
Haysden Manor Farm House	II	Haysden Lane			20 January 1972	TQ5687045355; 51°11′09″N 0°14′36″E		1069972	Upload Photo	Q26323445
Manor Farm Cottage	II	Haysden Lane			20 January 1972	TQ5694345364; 51°11′09″N 0°14′39″E		1120803	Upload Photo	Q26414011
Manor Farm Oast	II	Haysden Lane			28 January 1987	TQ5696745341; 51°11′09″N 0°14′41″E		1252232	Upload Photo	Q26544120
Smeed's Cottages	II	Haysden Lane			20 January 1972	TQ5695045624; 51°11′18″N 0°14′40″E		1069971	Upload Photo	Q26323442
73, High Street	II	73, High Street			8 May 1950	TQ5902846411; 51°11′41″N 0°16′28″E		1069973	Upload Photo	Q26323447
Ye Olde Chequers Inn	II*	122, High Street			8 May 1950	TQ5905946583; 51°11′47″N 0°16′30″E		1069979	Upload Photo	Q17546750
123 and 125, High Street	II	123 and 125, High Street			20 January 1972	TQ5908846628; 51°11′48″N 0°16′32″E		1120813	Upload Photo	Q26414021
124, High Street	II*	124, High Street			8 May 1950	TQ5905446596; 51°11′47″N 0°16′30″E		1363400	Upload Photo	Q17547131
126, 126A and 128, High Street	II	126, 126A and 128, High Street			20 January 1972	TQ5905146605; 51°11′48″N 0°16′30″E		1121860	Upload Photo	Q26415004
127-131, High Street	II	127-131, High Street			8 May 1950	TQ5908746657; 51°11′49″N 0°16′32″E		1323170	Upload Photo	Q26608921
136 and 138, High Street	II	136 and 138, High Street			20 January 1972	TQ5905546653; 51°11′49″N 0°16′30″E		1069980	Upload Photo	Q26323459
139, High Street	II	139, High Street			31 May 1988	TQ5909146690; 51°11′50″N 0°16′32″E		1363389	Upload Photo	Q26645217
140 and 142, High Street	II	140 and 142, High Street			20 January 1972	TQ5905646662; 51°11′49″N 0°16′30″E		1121865	Upload Photo	Q26415008
144, High Street	II	144, High Street			20 January 1972	TQ5905746670; 51°11′50″N 0°16′30″E		1363401	Upload Photo	Q26645228
145 and 147, High Street	II	145 and 147, High Street			20 January 1972	TQ5909046705; 51°11′51″N 0°16′32″E		1069975	Upload Photo	Q26323451
146, 146A and 148, High Street	II	146, 146A and 148, High Street			20 January 1972	TQ5905946680; 51°11′50″N 0°16′30″E		1069981	Upload Photo	Q26323461
151-153, High Street	II	151-153, High Street			20 December 1995	TQ5909146729; 51°11′51″N 0°16′32″E		1244676	151-153, High Street More images	Q26537268
154, High Street	II	154, High Street			20 January 1972	TQ5906046697; 51°11′50″N 0°16′31″E		1123741	Upload Photo	Q26416839
156, High Street	II	156, High Street			20 January 1972	TQ5906146701; 51°11′51″N 0°16′31″E		1363402	Upload Photo	Q26645229
157, High Street	II	157, High Street			20 January 1972	TQ5909446754; 51°11′52″N 0°16′32″E		1121139	157, High Street More images	Q26414321
158-164, High Street	II	158-164, High Street			20 January 1972	TQ5906446720; 51°11′51″N 0°16′31″E		1123745	Upload Photo	Q26416843
161, High Street	II	161, High Street			20 January 1972	TQ5909646767; 51°11′53″N 0°16′32″E		1069976	161, High Street More images	Q26323453
163, High Street	II	163, High Street			8 May 1950	TQ5909746774; 51°11′53″N 0°16′33″E		1363398	163, High Street More images	Q26645226
167-173, High Street	II	167-173, High Street			20 January 1972	TQ5910146793; 51°11′54″N 0°16′33″E		1121153	167-173, High Street More images	Q26414335
175-195, High Street	II	175-195, High Street			20 January 1972	TQ5911646834; 51°11′55″N 0°16′34″E		1069977	175-195, High Street More images	Q26323455
184 184A 184B, High Street	II	184 184A 184B, High Street			30 October 1973	TQ5908446817; 51°11′54″N 0°16′32″E		1252234	184 184A 184B, High Street More images	Q26544122
186, High Street	II	186, High Street			30 October 1973	TQ5908346827; 51°11′55″N 0°16′32″E		1262374	186, High Street More images	Q17645844
Ivy House Public House	II	199, High Street			8 May 1950	TQ5912646877; 51°11′56″N 0°16′34″E		1338555	Ivy House Public House More images	Q26622870
212, High Street	II	212, High Street			20 January 1972	TQ5910146906; 51°11′57″N 0°16′33″E		1069982	212, High Street More images	Q26323463
Graylings	II	214, High Street			8 May 1950	TQ5910146917; 51°11′58″N 0°16′33″E		1069983	Graylings More images	Q26323465
Cloister at the Chapel Tonbridge School	II	High Street			20 January 1972	TQ5902647110; 51°12′04″N 0°16′29″E		1069985	Upload Photo	Q26323470
Ferox Hall	II	High Street			8 May 1950	TQ5914346934; 51°11′58″N 0°16′35″E		1363399	Ferox Hall More images	Q26645227
Garden Wall to North and East of Ferox Hall	II	High Street			20 January 1972	TQ5917846929; 51°11′58″N 0°16′37″E		1069978	Upload Photo	Q26323457
Hanover House	II	High Street			20 January 1972	TQ5917447053; 51°12′02″N 0°16′37″E		1121888	Upload Photo	Q26415029
K6 Telephone Kiosk	II	High Street			17 January 1990	TQ5915547023; 51°12′01″N 0°16′36″E		1252229	Upload Photo	Q26544117
Old Judde House, Tonbridge School	II	High Street			8 May 1950	TQ5912047028; 51°12′01″N 0°16′34″E		1337643	Upload Photo	Q26622039
Outbuilding Opposite the Rose and Crown Tap	II	High Street			20 January 1972	TQ5917746661; 51°11′49″N 0°16′36″E		1363397	Outbuilding Opposite the Rose and Crown Tap More images	Q26645225
School Museum (The Old Chapel) Tonbridge School	II	High Street			20 January 1972	TQ5911547005; 51°12′00″N 0°16′34″E		1363404	Upload Photo	Q26645231
The Chapel Tonbridge School	II	High Street			8 May 1950	TQ5904947089; 51°12′03″N 0°16′31″E		1111773	Upload Photo	Q26405570
The Headmaster's House the Skinners' School Library Tonbridge School	II	High Street			20 January 1972	TQ5909746955; 51°11′59″N 0°16′33″E		1363403	Upload Photo	Q26645230
The North Half of the Main School Buildings Tonbridge School	II	High Street			20 January 1972	TQ5909447046; 51°12′02″N 0°16′33″E		1069984	Upload Photo	Q26323467
The Rose and Crown Hotel	II	High Street			8 May 1950	TQ5908846640; 51°11′49″N 0°16′32″E		1069974	Upload Photo	Q26323449
The South Half of the Main School Buildings Tonbridge School	II	High Street			20 January 1972	TQ5907646988; 51°12′00″N 0°16′32″E		1124184	Upload Photo	Q26417262
The Cardinal's Error Inn	II	Lodge Oak Lane			20 January 1972	TQ5980845481; 51°11′10″N 0°17′07″E		1363421	Upload Photo	Q26645247
Manor Cottages	II	1 and 2, London Road			8 May 1950	TQ5820847599; 51°12′21″N 0°15′48″E		1363423	Upload Photo	Q26645249
9 and 11, London Road	II	9 and 11, London Road			20 January 1972	TQ5911847166; 51°12′06″N 0°16′34″E		1069941	Upload Photo	Q26323383
Andrew House	II	13 and 15, London Road			20 January 1972	TQ5911147178; 51°12′06″N 0°16′34″E		1069942	Upload Photo	Q26323385
17, London Road	II	17, London Road			20 January 1972	TQ5910247187; 51°12′06″N 0°16′33″E		1363422	Upload Photo	Q26645248
21 and 23, London Road	II	21 and 23, London Road			20 January 1972	TQ5909247195; 51°12′07″N 0°16′33″E		1111743	Upload Photo	Q26405540
27 and 29, London Road	II	27 and 29, London Road			20 January 1972	TQ5907547205; 51°12′07″N 0°16′32″E		1069943	Upload Photo	Q26323386
Hawden	II	London Road			20 January 1972	TQ5783947446; 51°12′16″N 0°15′29″E		1069944	Upload Photo	Q26323389
Hilden Manor	II	London Road			8 May 1950	TQ5806847656; 51°12′22″N 0°15′41″E		1111751	Upload Photo	Q26405550
Oasthouses and Granary to the South of Hawden	II	London Road			20 January 1972	TQ5781047246; 51°12′09″N 0°15′27″E		1337033	Upload Photo	Q26621487
Grove Cottage	II	Mill Lane			20 January 1972	TQ5957746826; 51°11′54″N 0°16′57″E		1069945	Upload Photo	Q26323391
Grove House	II	Mill Lane			20 January 1972	TQ5957746816; 51°11′54″N 0°16′57″E		1363424	Upload Photo	Q26645250
Mill Cottage	II	Mill Lane			20 January 1972	TQ5957146778; 51°11′53″N 0°16′57″E		1111757	Upload Photo	Q26405556
Hadlow Stair Farm House	II	Old Hadlow Road			4 November 1970	TQ6085347641; 51°12′19″N 0°18′04″E		1069946	Upload Photo	Q26323392
1, Portman Park, Tonbridge	II	1, Portman Park, Tonbridge			2 July 2003	TQ5921447077; 51°12′03″N 0°16′39″E		1414171	Upload Photo	Q26676396
Postern Forge House	II	Postern Lane			20 January 1972	TQ6064946219; 51°11′33″N 0°17′52″E		1069947	Upload Photo	Q26323395
Postern Heath Farm House	II	Postern Lane			8 May 1950	TQ6051546294; 51°11′36″N 0°17′45″E		1111913	Upload Photo	Q26405738
114 and 115, Quarry Hill	II	114 and 115, Quarry Hill			20 January 1972	TQ5839845046; 51°10′58″N 0°15′54″E		1069948	Upload Photo	Q26323397
1 and 2, Shipbourne Road	II	1 and 2, Shipbourne Road			8 May 1950	TQ5918947094; 51°12′03″N 0°16′38″E		1069949	Upload Photo	Q26323398
3, Shipbourne Road	II	3, Shipbourne Road			20 January 1972	TQ5918947103; 51°12′03″N 0°16′38″E		1111898	Upload Photo	Q26405714
4, Shipbourne Road	II	4, Shipbourne Road			20 January 1972	TQ5918947126; 51°12′04″N 0°16′38″E		1069950	Upload Photo	Q26323401
19, Shipbourne Road	II	19, Shipbourne Road			20 January 1972	TQ5920347194; 51°12′06″N 0°16′39″E		1069952	Upload Photo	Q26323405
Cage Green Farm House	II	198, Shipbourne Road			8 May 1950	TQ5919847961; 51°12′31″N 0°16′40″E		1069954	Upload Photo	Q26323408
20 and 21, Shipbourne Road	II	20 and 21, Shipbourne Road			20 January 1972	TQ5920447201; 51°12′07″N 0°16′39″E		1069953	Upload Photo	Q26323406
22 and 23, Shipbourne Road	II	22 and 23, Shipbourne Road			8 May 1950	TQ5920647212; 51°12′07″N 0°16′39″E		1111877	Upload Photo	Q26405688
24, Shipbourne Road	II	24, Shipbourne Road			20 January 1972	TQ5920847218; 51°12′07″N 0°16′39″E		1363386	Upload Photo	Q26645214
313-315, Shipbourne Road	II	313-315, Shipbourne Road			24 August 1998	TQ5936448357; 51°12′44″N 0°16′49″E		1119777	Upload Photo	Q26413069
Dry Hill Farm House and Cottage Adjoining Dry Hill Farm House	II	Shipbourne Road			20 January 1972	TQ5922447161; 51°12′05″N 0°16′40″E		1069951	Upload Photo	Q26323403
The George and Dragon Public House	II	Shipbourne Road			20 January 1972	TQ5919747173; 51°12′06″N 0°16′38″E		1111869	Upload Photo	Q26405675
The Manor House	II	Shipbourne Road			20 January 1972	TQ5917347197; 51°12′07″N 0°16′37″E		1111885	Upload Photo	Q26405700
Old School House	II	St Stephens Street			15 May 2007	TQ5878845798; 51°11′22″N 0°16′15″E		1392688	Upload Photo	Q26671897
Barn to South of Hadlow Stair House	II	Stair Road			7 October 1986	TQ6090747683; 51°12′21″N 0°18′07″E		1252233	Upload Photo	Q26544121
Hadlow Stair House	II	Stair Road			7 October 1986	TQ6090347720; 51°12′22″N 0°18′07″E		1363390	Upload Photo	Q26645218
Cage Farm House	II	77 and 79, The Ridgeway			8 May 1950	TQ5944447913; 51°12′29″N 0°16′52″E		1111895	Upload Photo	Q26405712
The Old Power Station	II	The Slade			22 October 1986	TQ5884246706; 51°11′51″N 0°16′19″E		1069958	Upload Photo	Q26323417
Rose Cottage	II	Three Elms Lane			20 January 1972	TQ6188648439; 51°12′44″N 0°18′59″E		1363387	Upload Photo	Q26645215
Stables to West of Ye Olde Vauxhall Inn	II	Vauxhall Lane			20 January 1972	TQ5952445028; 51°10′56″N 0°16′52″E		1069955	Upload Photo	Q26323411
Ye Olde Vauxhall Inn	II	Vauxhall Lane			8 May 1950	TQ5953845022; 51°10′56″N 0°16′52″E		1111862	Upload Photo	Q26405666

== See also ==
- Grade I listed buildings in Tonbridge and Malling
- Grade II* listed buildings in Tonbridge and Malling

== Sources ==
- Newman, John (2012) [1969], Kent: West and the Weald, The Buildings of England, New Haven and London: Yale University Press, ISBN 978-0-300-18509-6
