= St Peter and St Paul's Church, Tonbridge =

Anglican parish in Kent, England

Tonbridge Parish Church
- St Peter and St Paul's Church, Tonbridge
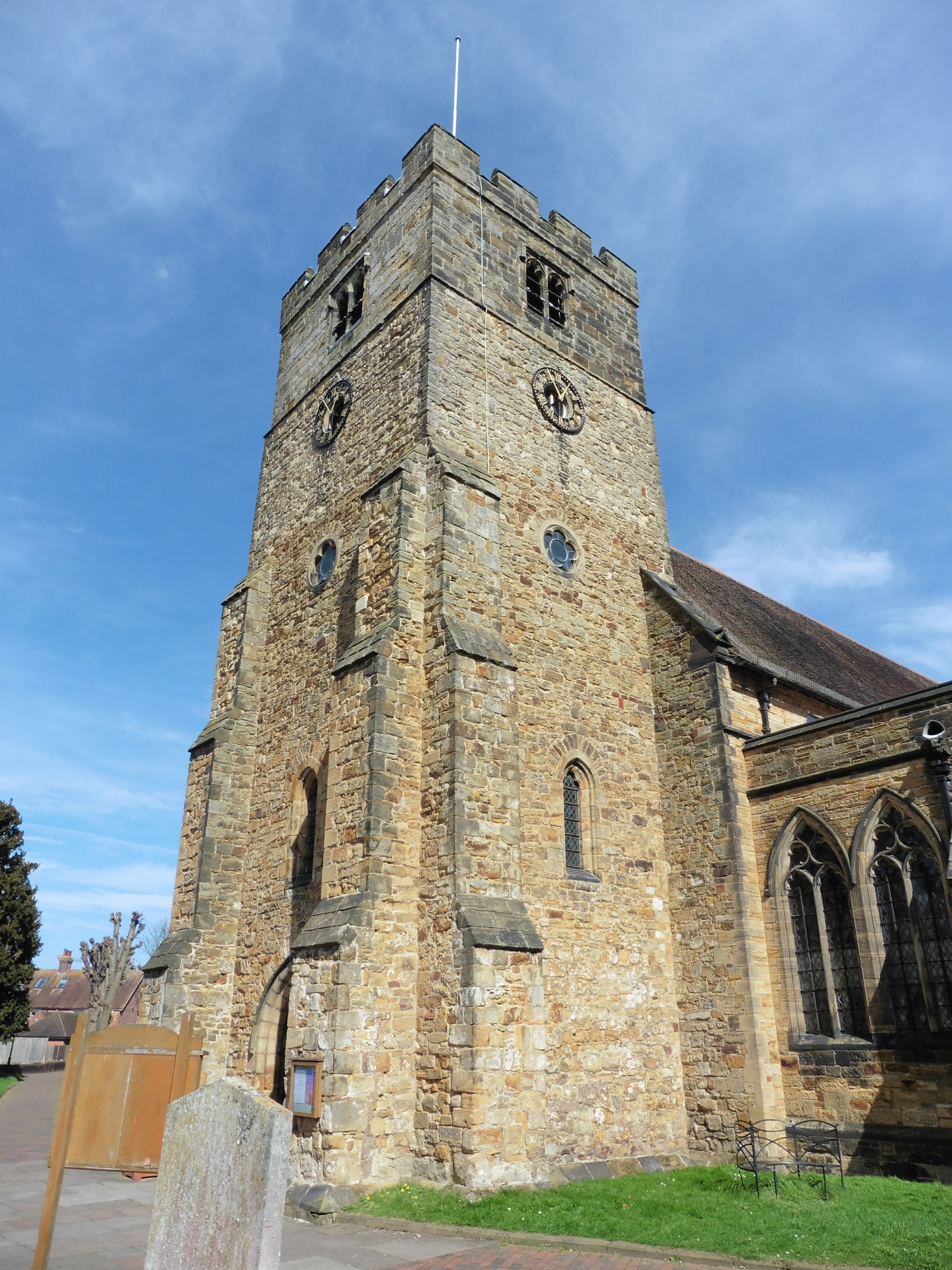
- Tonbridge Parish Church
- 51°11′51″N 0°16′34″E; TQ 5914 4673
- Address: Tonbridge Parish Church, Church Street, Tonbridge, Kent TN9 1DA
- Country: England
- Denomination: Church of England
- Website: tonbridgeparishchurch.org.uk

History
- Status: Parish church
- Dedication: Saint Peter and Saint Paul

Architecture
- Functional status: Active
- Heritage designation: Grade II* listed
- Designated: 8 May 1950
- Years built: Late 11th century

Administration
- Province: Canterbury
- Diocese: Rochester
- Archdeaconry: Tonbridge

St Peter and St Paul's Church is a Church of England parish church in the Diocese of Rochester in Tonbridge, Kent, England.

== History ==
The church was built in the late 11th century, following the Norman Conquest and the building of Tonbridge Castle. The earliest surviving part of the church forms part of the north wall of the chancel. The chancel was extended in the 12th century. In the late 13th century, the nave was partly demolished and rebuilt, and the construction of the north aisle was started. This was completed in the early 14th century. The tower was built at this time. Buttresses were added to the chancel and a new window added to the south. This was blocked up c. 1500. The east window dates from the 15th century, during which time the tower was raised in height. A gallery was added to the north aisle in 1663, for the use of boys from Tonbridge School. In 1759, George Hooper left £500 in his will to provide box pews

A chapel on the south east side of the nave was demolished in 1820. in that year, the south aisle was added. In 1837, a dispute occurred between the vicar and the bellringers. The latter wanted to celebrate the election of Thomas Law Hodges, a Whig, to Parliament during the general election. The vicar, Sir Charles Hardinge, a Conservative supporter, objected. The MP declined to intervene. The dispute was settled by the vicar presenting the ringers with a sovereign, threatening them that if there was ever a reoccurrence they would have them before the Ecclesiastical court on a charge of ecclesiastical waste. The nave roof was rebuilt in 1878. This was part of renovations carried out between August 1877 and June 1879 during which a new south aisle, organ chamber and vestry were built and the gallery and box pews were removed. On 8 May 1950, the church was designated a Grade II* listed building. In April 1951, the funeral of Prince Belosselsky took place in the church, before his burial at Tonbridge Cemetery. Canon Russell White gave permission for his open coffin to lie in state in the church the night before the funeral, in accordance with Russian Orthodox tradition. Prince Belosselsky had fled Russia in 1917 during the Russian Revolution and had lived in Tonbridge since 1923. In 1983, the south aisle and west end were altered to form a new church centre.

== Bells ==
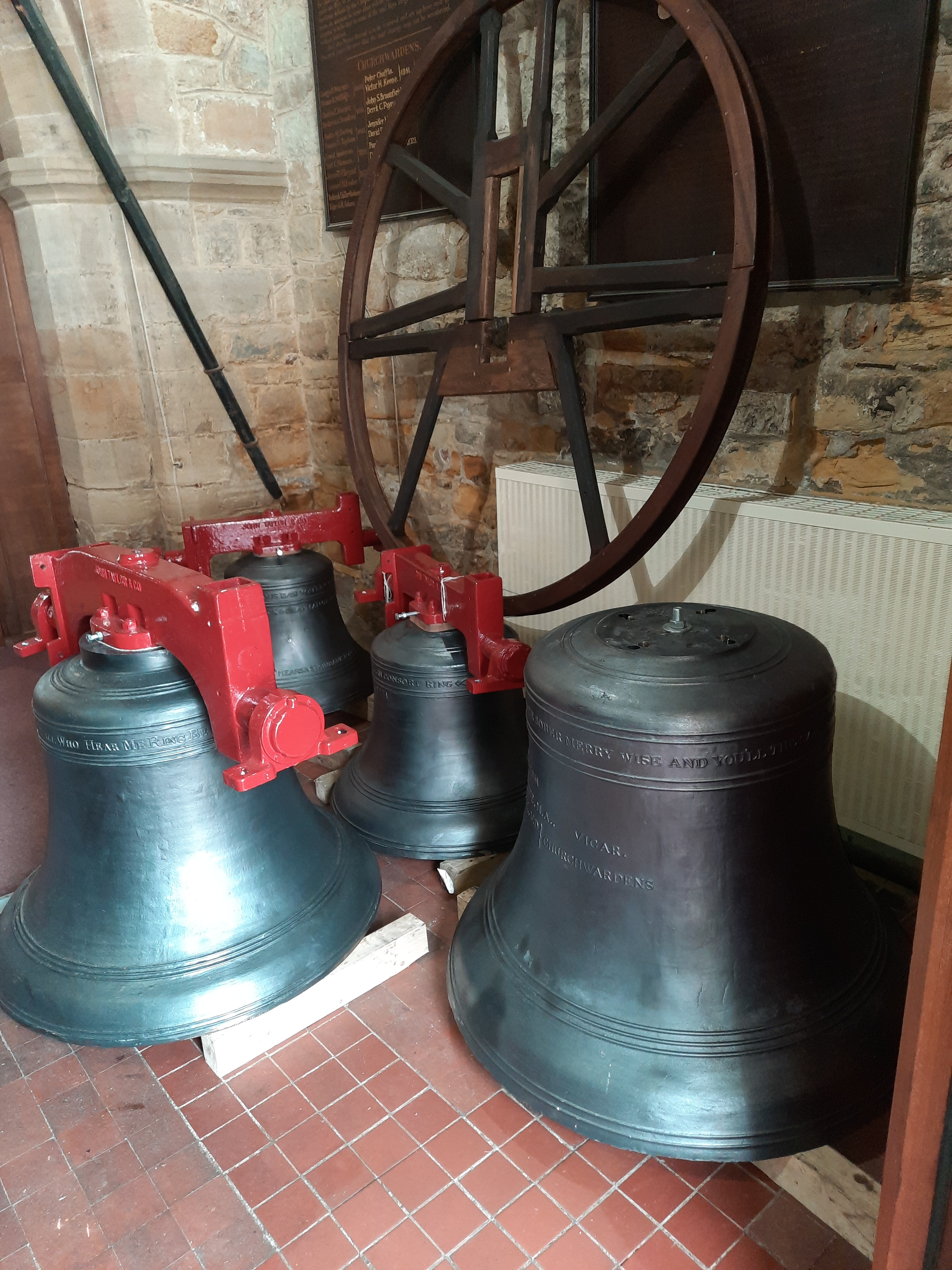
Some of the bells awaiting rehanging, March 2025

The church has a ring of eight bells, hung for change ringing. The three oldest (the 3rd, 4th and 5th) were cast in 1774 by Pack & Chapman, Whitechapel, Middlesex. The Tenor was recast in 1897 by Mears & Stainbank, Whitechapel. The other four bells were recast in 1952 by Mears & Stainbank. In 2024/25, all eight bells were refurbished. They were rehung in March 2025.

In around 1700 the Sanctus Bell was recast. In 1774, a ring of eight bells was cast by Pack & Chapman, replacing an earlier ring of six bells. The tenor was recast by Mears & Stainbank in 1897 and the treble in 1913. In 1948, the frame that the bells were hung on was condemned. The seventh bell was discovered to be cracked.

== Construction ==
The church is built of local sandstone, with Tunbridge Wells Sandstone, Kentish Ragstone and Reigate Stone also being used. The boundary walls around the churchyard are of brick. The graveyard lies on the north side of the church and the rectory on the south side.

== Notable burials and memorials ==
Notable people buried in the church and churchyard include Lady Philadelphia Lyttleton, who died while accompanying Queen Catherine on a visit to Tunbridge Wells in 1663. Another is Richard Children, who died in 1753; his memorial, in the north aisle, was carved by Louis-François Roubiliac. A memorial to the Kent cricketer Colin Blythe, who was killed in the First World War, is in the church.
