= Tonbridge Swimming Pool =

Swimming pool in Tonbridge, Kent, England

Coordinates: 51.196188°N 0.271828°E

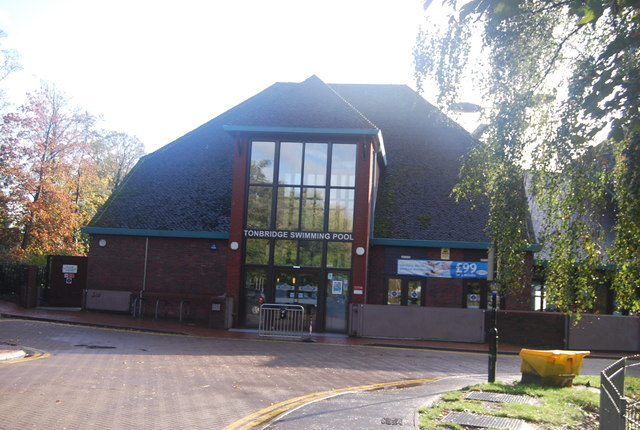
Tonbridge Swimming Pool

Tonbridge Swimming Pool is a swimming pool in Tonbridge, Kent. It has an indoor teaching and toddler pool, plus a fitness pool joined to a heated outdoor pool or lido linked by a swim-through channel.

== Description ==
The four lane, heated, 20 metre open air pool has a man-made beach and a large sunbathing terrace.

There is a café and a spa, which includes a spa pool Jacuzzi, sauna, steam room, aromatherapy room, sunbeds, and heated loungers.

== History ==
The original heated outdoor pool was built in 1910. The indoor pool opened in 1996.

It is owned and operated by Tonbridge and Malling Borough Council.
