= Tonbridge Half Marathon =

Road running event in Kent, England

Coordinates: 51°11′15″N 0°15′46″E

- Date: September
- Location: Tonbridge, Kent
- Event type: Half marathon
- Distance: 13.1 miles (21.1 km)
- Established: 2011
- Website: www.tonbridgehalfmarathon.co.uk

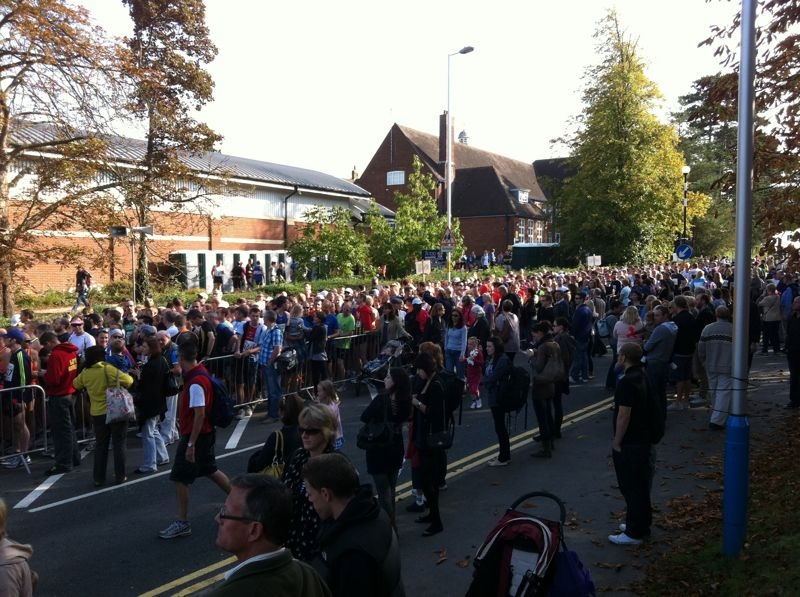
Masses at the Start

The Tonbridge Half Marathon is an English annual road running event that was introduced on 25 September 2011. Organised by the Tonbridge Lions Club and Tonbridge Rotary Club, it attracted over 800 runners in its inaugural event.

Dame Kelly Holmes attended the first event in 2011 as guest starter.

== Course ==
The course circumnavigates the roads of Tonbridge and the Kent countryside. The route starts at K College on Brook Street and takes runners out of Tonbridge along Molescroft Way, Upper Hayesden Lane, and Ensfield Road to the village of Leigh. Runners pass through the village then head along the B2027 towards Hildenborough, turning left into Watts Cross Road and then left again at every junction back into Leigh. The final leg of the course takes runners back through Leigh village centre onto Ensfield Road, Hayesden Lane, then leading back to Brook Street to the finish.

== Past winners ==
Year	Date	Men's race	Time (h:m:s)	Women's race	Time (h:m:s)
2011	25 September	Thomas Fewster	1:15:48	Tina Oldershaw	1:21:55
2012	23 September	Julian Rendall	1:14:00	Tina Oldershaw	1:22:49
2013	22 September	Thomas Fewster	1:13:14	Maria Heslop	1:20:43
2014	28 September	Julian Rendall	1:14:08	Maria Heslop	1:22:46
2015	4 October	Daniel Bradley	1:12:40	Lucy Reid	1:20:57
2016	2 October	Julian Rendall	1:14:29	Maria Heslop	1:22:00
2017	1 October	Julian Rendall	1:14:17	Maria Heslop	1:23:34
2018	7 October	Daniel Gaffney	1:11:25	Maria Heslop	1:22:32
2019	6 October	Anthony Bradley	1:15:52	Helen Gaunt	1:27:01
2020	No Event				
2021	10 October	Daniel Bradley	1:11:04	Jo Vickers	1:27:06
2022	9 October	Daniel Bradley	1:15:19	Helen Gaunt	1:19:43
2023	1 October	Matthew Dennis	1:14:26	Helen Gaunt	1:22:14
