= Haysden Country Park =

Country park in Kent, England

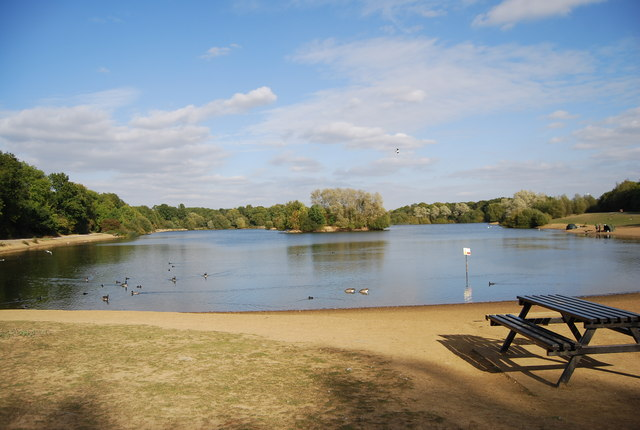
- Barden Lake in Haysden Country Park
- Interactive map of Haysden Country Park
- Coordinates: 51°11′31″N 0°14′51″E
- Area: 64 hectares (160 acres)
- Created: 1988
- Operator: Tonbridge and Malling Borough Council
- Open: 7 days a week, dawn until dusk
- Website: Haysden Country Park

Haysden Country Park shown within Kent (grid reference TQ23596315)

Haysden Country Park is a 64-hectare (160-acre) country park and Local Nature Reserve on the outskirts of Tonbridge in Kent. It is owned by Tonbridge and Malling Borough Council, the Highways Agency, Network Rail and the Environment Agency, and managed by the council.

== Geography ==
The park comprises 64 hectares (160 acres) of countryside to the west of Tonbridge. The park has two lakes, Barden Lake and Haysden Water, and has a stretch of the River Medway running through it, with various branches and streams. Consequently there are a large number of bridges, many of which are named. The park is home to a variety of wildlife including waterfowl, wild flowers, and insect life. It is designated as a Site of Nature Conservation Interest, and as of October 27, 2008 it has been designated a Local Nature Reserve.

The A21 passes on a viaduct near Haysden Water. Immediately to the east of this viaduct, and roughly parallel to it, is the Medway flood barrier. The railway line from Tonbridge towards Redhill, Surrey also passes through the park.

== History ==
The park was opened as a Country Park in 1988, but the land had been partly owned by the Tonbridge Council and had been used by the public long before then. It is still managed by Tonbridge and Malling Borough Council.

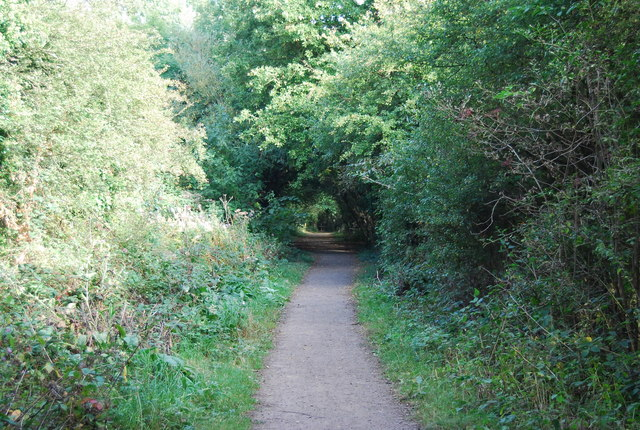
Cycleway on the Straight Mile

Leading off the River Medway is the Straight Mile, which was dug in 1830. James Christie intended this to be a canal leading to Tonbridge Water Mill, but it was never filled with water. The Stone Lock, built in 1829 (also by James Christie) at Haysden, remains largely intact. It leads towards Haysden Water (and continues on the other side of Haysden Water, outside the park). The lock was intended for transferring barges between the level of the Straight Mile and the higher level of the River Medway.

Another section of the park is The Shallows, a winding stream leading off the River Medway, with various gravel beds for crossing the river. It was at one stage part of the River Medway, with meanders which were sometimes shallow and therefore difficult to navigate with large boats. Since the river was used by canal craft, a navigable diversion was constructed around this section. The Shallows then became a quiet backwater stream which is gradually developing into marshland.

Barden Lake was created when sand and gravel were extracted from the land between 1974 and 1980. Dragline excavators were used to dig the material out. The Lake is approximately 3.6 metres (12 feet) deep.

A World War II pillbox can be found in the hedgerow along the riverbank. This pillbox and others along the River Medway formed part of the Ironside Line. On 27 May 1944, Prime Minister Winston Churchill put General Sir Edmund Ironside in charge of creating a first line of defence against German invasion forces.

A project to name the 14 bridges that are included in the park was announced on 24 November 2008 at the Tonbridge Forum; names had been decided. As at 2015, this work appears to be complete.

== How to get there ==
From Tonbridge, the Lower Haysden Road leads towards Lower Haysden and Upper Haysden. On the right (when driving from Tonbridge) is the visitor centre and car park. Regional Cycle Route 12 leads from Tonbridge through the park towards Penshurst, and can also be used by pedestrians. The nearest railway station is Tonbridge (1.5 miles to the visitor centre).

== Activities ==
The park is a setting for a variety of leisure activities.

- Walking - The Eden Valley Walk and Wealdway lead through the park.

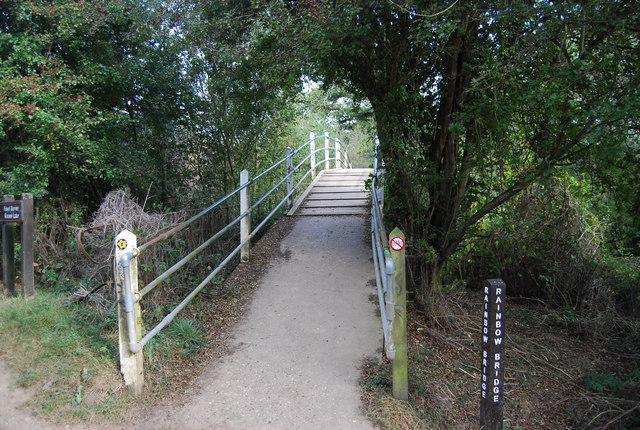
Bridge in Haysden Country Park, with marker showing the name of the bridge

- Children's play area
- Sailing
- Fishing
- Nature study
- Volunteering

=== Fishing ===
This is run by Tonbridge & District Angling & Fish Preservation Society, and is controlled by a warden on Barden Lake.

=== Sailing ===
This is encouraged on Haysden Lake by Tonbridge Town Sailing Club for small vessels.

=== Nature and Historical Trails ===
Tonbridge and Malling Borough Council publish guides for people to use to discover the nature and history of the area. These walks have been described as "interesting"

== Awards ==
Since 2006 the park has been a Green Flag Award winning park. In January 2001, the park was applauded by the Tonbridge and Malling Access Group for its achievement in providing access for disabled people.
