= Tudor Trail =

The Tudor Trail
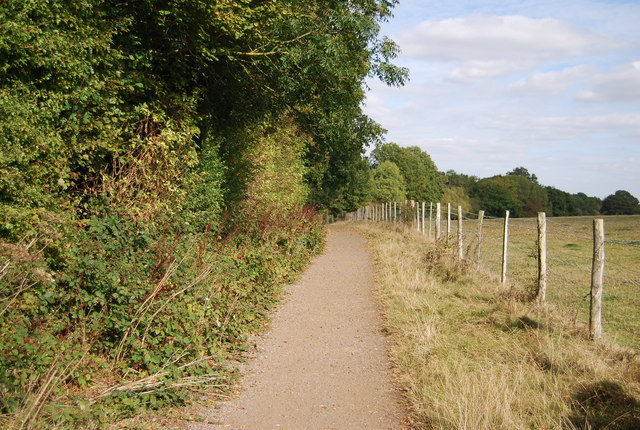
- The Tudor Trail and National Cycleway 12 near Leigh (heading to Tonbridge)
- Length: 6 mi (9.7 km)
- Location: Kent
- Trailheads: Tonbridge Castle; 51.1747°N 0.1838°E; Penshurst Place; 51.1966°N 0.2738°E
- Use: Cycling and Hiking,
- Difficulty: Easy
- Months: All year
- Sights: Wealden countryside

The Tudor Trail is a 6-mile multi-user linear route between 2 historic buildings in the Wealden countryside. It is also part of 'Regional Route 12' of the National Cycle Network.

== Route ==
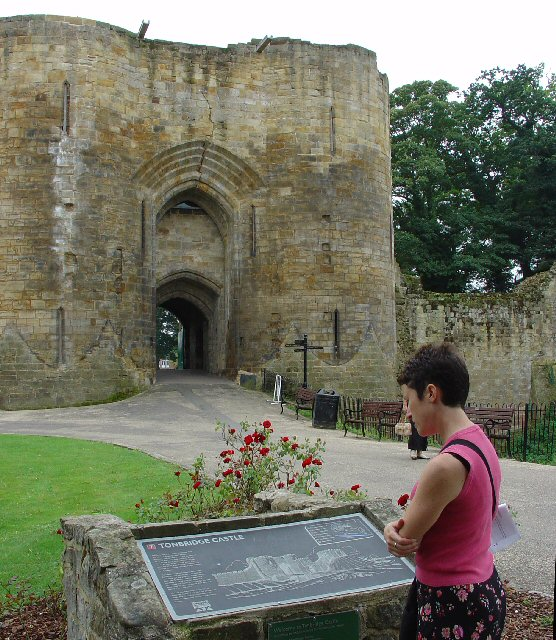
Tonbridge Castle Gatehouse

The trail starts at Tonbridge Castle, then leads through Haysden Country Park (around Barden Lake), then through the village of Lower Haysden, it then passes under the Tonbridge by-pass (part of the A21) via a quiet lane, then it uses a bridleway to link back to a portion of Haysden Country Park. It meets the 'Eden Valley Walk' (along distance path between Penshurst and Edenbridge). They then head along 'The Straight Mile' which is the remains of a canal built in the 1829 to join Penshurst to the navigable part of the River Medway. The canal was never completed or ever used. Then mile ends near Ensfield Road which passes over the River Medway. The route then heads along a bridleway to Killick's Bank farm. The route then heads to a section of the route with the only slight climb of the route, heading up to Wells Place Farm. The farm is on the Penshurst Estate and the route then heads down to Penshurst Place, the destination of the route.

The route has been recommended by Bradley Wiggins as one of the top cycling routes in the country.

Some guides mention the trail continuing (past Penshurst) to Hever Castle via Chiddingstone, extending the trail to 10miles (16 km).

The route is mentioned in the 'AA guide Cycling in the SE of England'.

Recommended OS maps to use are OS Explorer 147, OS Landranger 188.

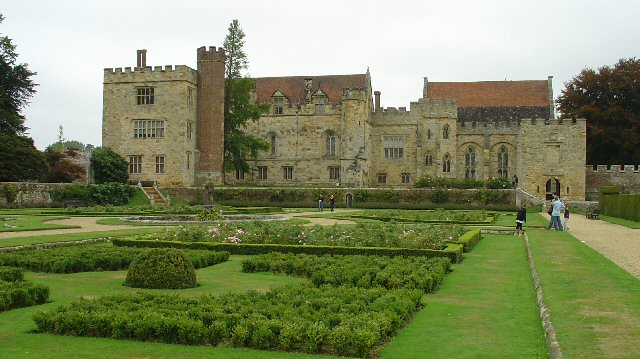
Penshurst Place
