= Tonbridge =

Market town in Kent, England

Coordinates: 51°11′55″N 0°16′35″E

- Market town
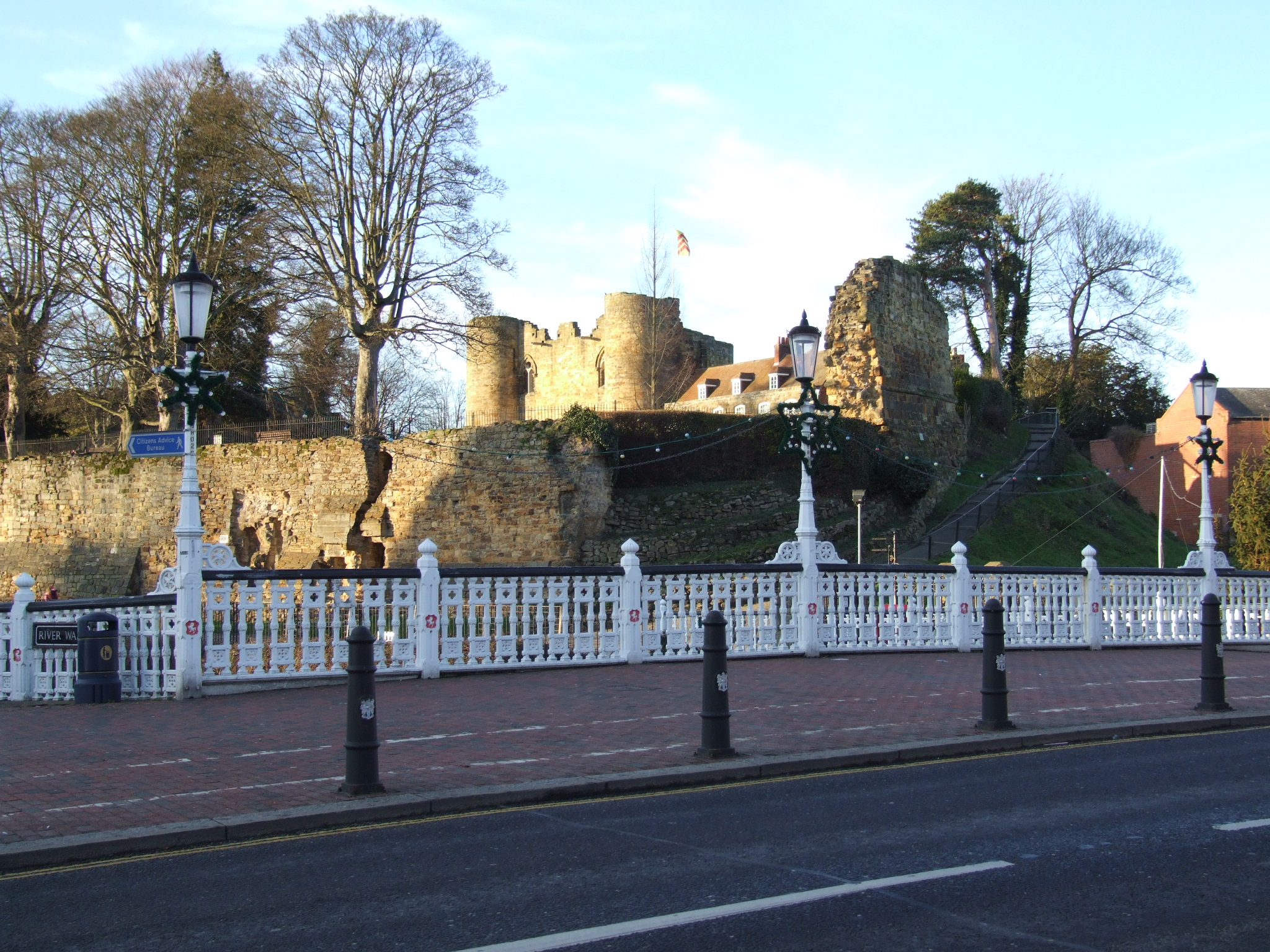
- Tonbridge Castle

- Location within Kent
- Population: 36,115 (2021)
- OS grid reference: TQ591468
- District: Tonbridge and Malling
- Shire county: Kent
- Region: South East
- Country: England
- Sovereign state: United Kingdom
- Post town: TONBRIDGE
- Postcode district: TN9–TN12
- Dialling code: 01732
- Police: Kent
- Fire: Kent
- Ambulance: South East Coast
- UK Parliament: Tonbridge

Tonbridge (/ˈtʌnbrɪdʒ/ TUN-brij; historic spelling Tunbridge) is a market town in Kent, England, on the River Medway, 4 miles (6 km) north of Royal Tunbridge Wells, 12 miles (19 km) south west of Maidstone and 29 miles (47 km) south east of London. In the administrative borough of Tonbridge and Malling, it had an estimated population of 36,115 in 2021.

== History ==
The town was recorded in Domesday Book 1086 as Tonebrige, which may indicate a bridge belonging to the estate or manor (from the Old English tun), or alternatively a bridge belonging to Tunna, a common Anglo-Saxon man's name. Another theory suggests that the name is a contraction of "town of bridges", due to the large number of streams the High Street originally crossed.

Until 1870, the town's name was spelt Tunbridge, as shown on old maps including the 1871 Ordnance Survey map and contemporary issues of the Bradshaw railway guide. In 1870, this was changed to Tonbridge by the GPO due to confusion with nearby Tunbridge Wells, despite Tonbridge being a much older settlement. Tunbridge Wells has always maintained the same spelling.

=== Normans and Tonbridge Castle ===
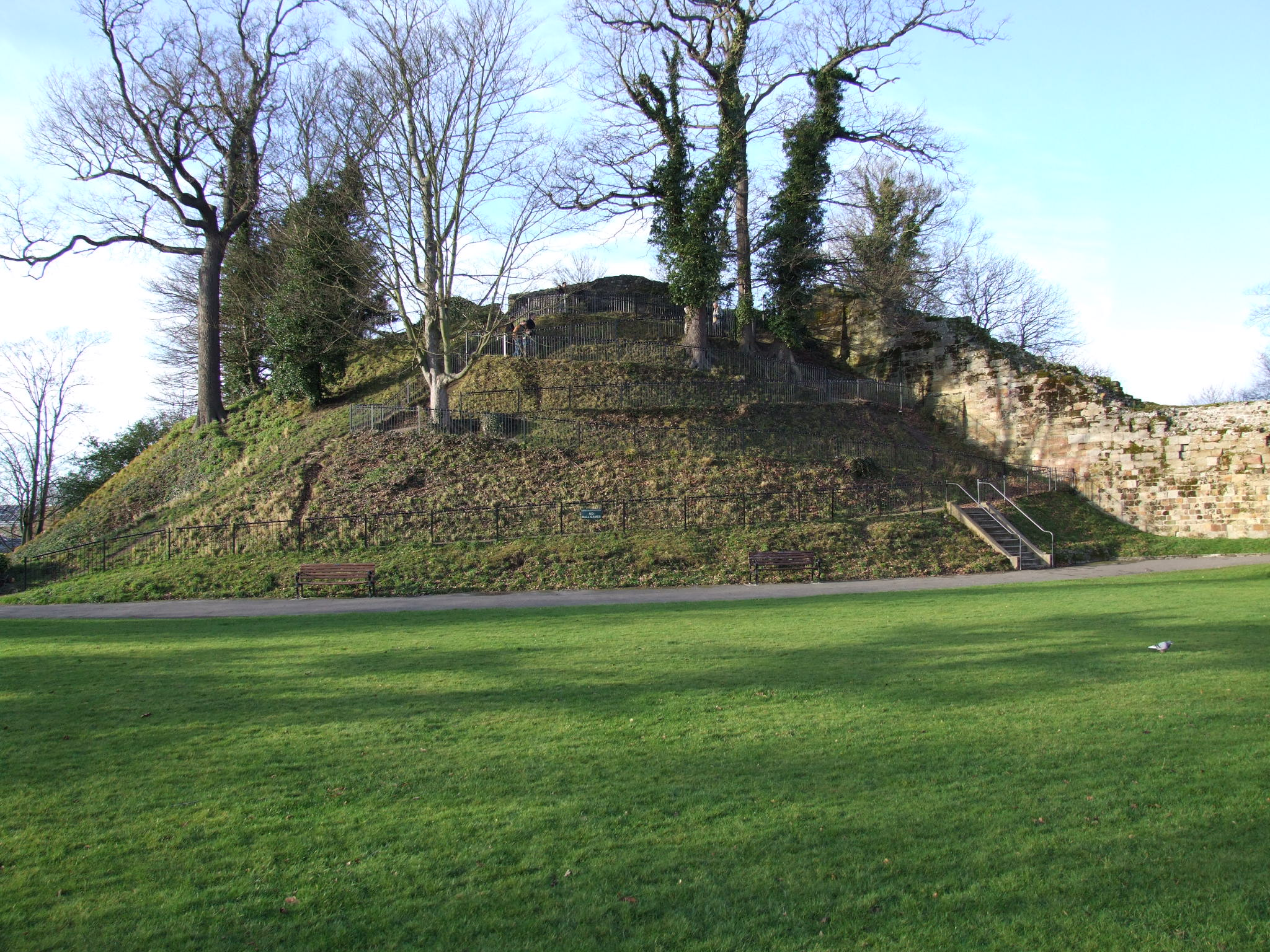
The motte of Tonbridge Castle

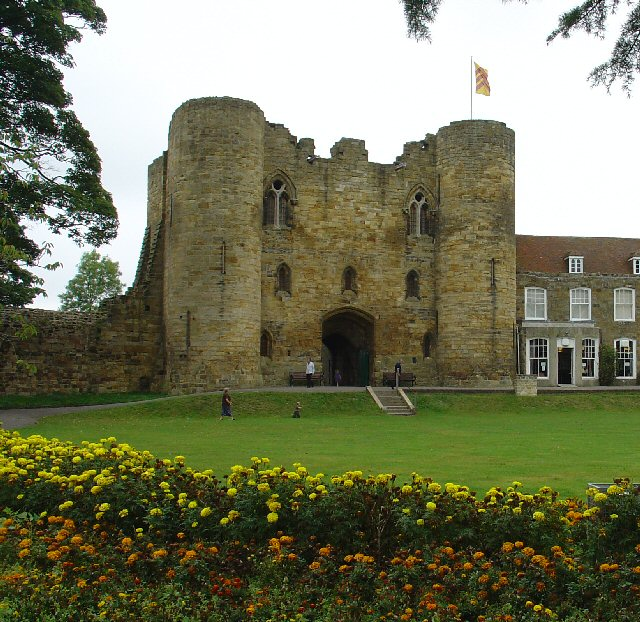
Tonbridge Castle gatehouse

Tonbridge stands on a spur of higher land where the marshy River Medway could be more easily forded. Ancient trackways converged at this point. There is no record of any bridge before 1191. For much of its existence, the town remained to the north of the river, since the land to the south was subject to extensive seasonal flooding. One part of the town is called 'Dryhill'. Richard Fitz Gilbert de Clare founded the Priory of St Mary Magdalene in 1124.

A motte and bailey castle was built here in the 11th century by Richard Fitz Gilbert, son of the murdered guardian of the infant William the Conqueror. Richard was responsible for governing England in William I's many absences.

The town was besieged by William Rufus, soon after his accession to the throne, because the Earl had pledged allegiance to William's brother, Robert. William Rufus died from an arrow wound a few years later, in an incident generally reported as a hunting accident, when he was shot by Walter Tirel, Richard Fitz Gilbert's son-in-law, & born in Tonbridge himself.

=== Medieval ===
The town was soon afterwards taken again, this time by King John only a few months after the signing of the Magna Carta. Both the Earl and his son were signatories and guardians of the document responsible for its compliance. It was subsequently besieged by Prince Edward, son of Henry III. On this occasion the besieged garrison burnt the town rather than see it fall. The town and Tonbridge Castle were rebuilt after this and in the 13th century became an official residence and records repository of Edward II.

In later medieval times, Tonbridge was considered an important strategic settlement. Some evidence shows Henry III intended it to be a walled town, and a charter was issued allowing for walls to be built, a market to be held, court sessions to be held and two members from the town to attend parliament. The walls were never built, perhaps because the castle's large outer bailey could have easily accommodated the townspeople in times of strife. A surrounding bank and ditch known as The Fosse was erected. Today only traces of this encircling defence now remain. The historic core of the town still contains a large number of working buildings dating from the 15th century: the oldest is Port Reeves in East Street.

Tonbridge School, the famous public school, was established in 1553 under letters patent of Edward VI, to educate the sons of local gentry and farmers (There was already a nearby school in existence for poorer boys, now Sevenoaks School.)

During Queen Mary's reign Tonbridge was involved in an unsuccessful uprising against the Queen's marriage to the King of Spain, with 500 townspeople involved in the Battle of Hartley in 1554. As a result, the town was chosen for a place of execution of a number of Protestants; and in 1555 James Tutty and Margery Polley were burned at the stake in the town and Joan Beach met the same fate in 1556 at Rochester. A memorial to Margery Polly is on the green at Pembury.

=== 17th and 18th centuries ===
During the Civil War, the town was garrisoned by the Parliamentarian side who refortified the castle. Royalist sympathisers made several attempts to take the town but were repulsed.

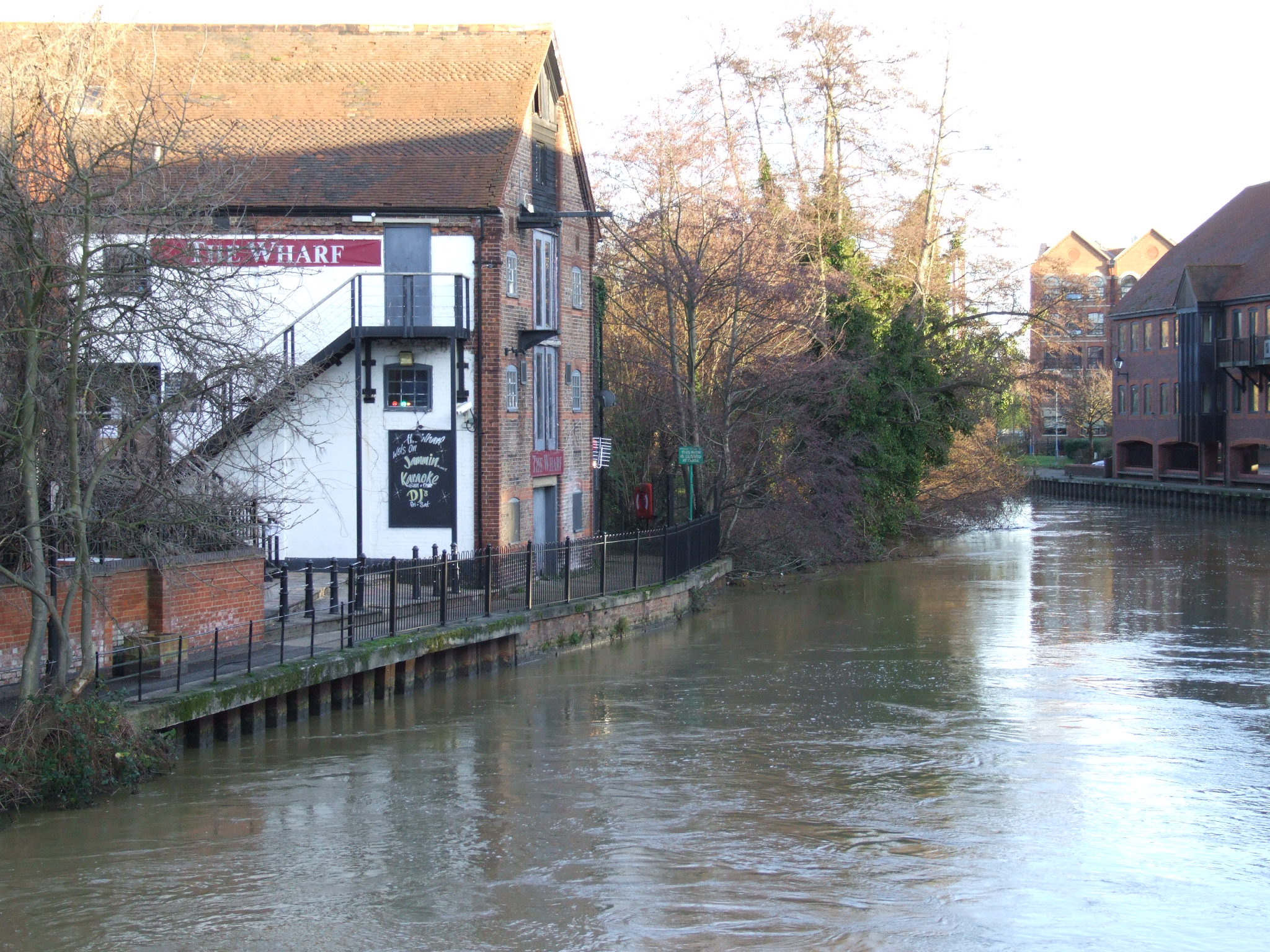
The Wharf on the Medway Navigation, downstream of the Big Bridge.

In 1740 an Act of Parliament was passed to make the River Medway navigable to Tonbridge by the Medway Navigation Company, allowing such materials as coal and lime to be transported to the town, and gunpowder, hops and timber to be carried downriver to Maidstone and the Thames. For a hundred years the Medway Navigation Company was highly profitable, paying out good dividends to its investors, but after the arrival of the railway in 1842 the company went into a steep decline and all commercial traffic ceased in 1911 when the company collapsed. Some of the original warehouses and the wharves are still recognisable today, downstream of the town's main bridge.

Later, the town and its surroundings became famous for the production of finely inlaid wooden cabinets, boxes and other objects called Tunbridgeware, which were sold to tourists who were taking the waters at the nearby springs at Tunbridge Wells. Another speciality in the town was until recently the production of cricket balls (the original cricket ball factory in Preston Road was demolished in 2012 to make way for housing) and other sports goods. The Corn Exchange in Bank Street, which was originally conceived as a chapel, dates from 1790.

=== 19th century to present ===
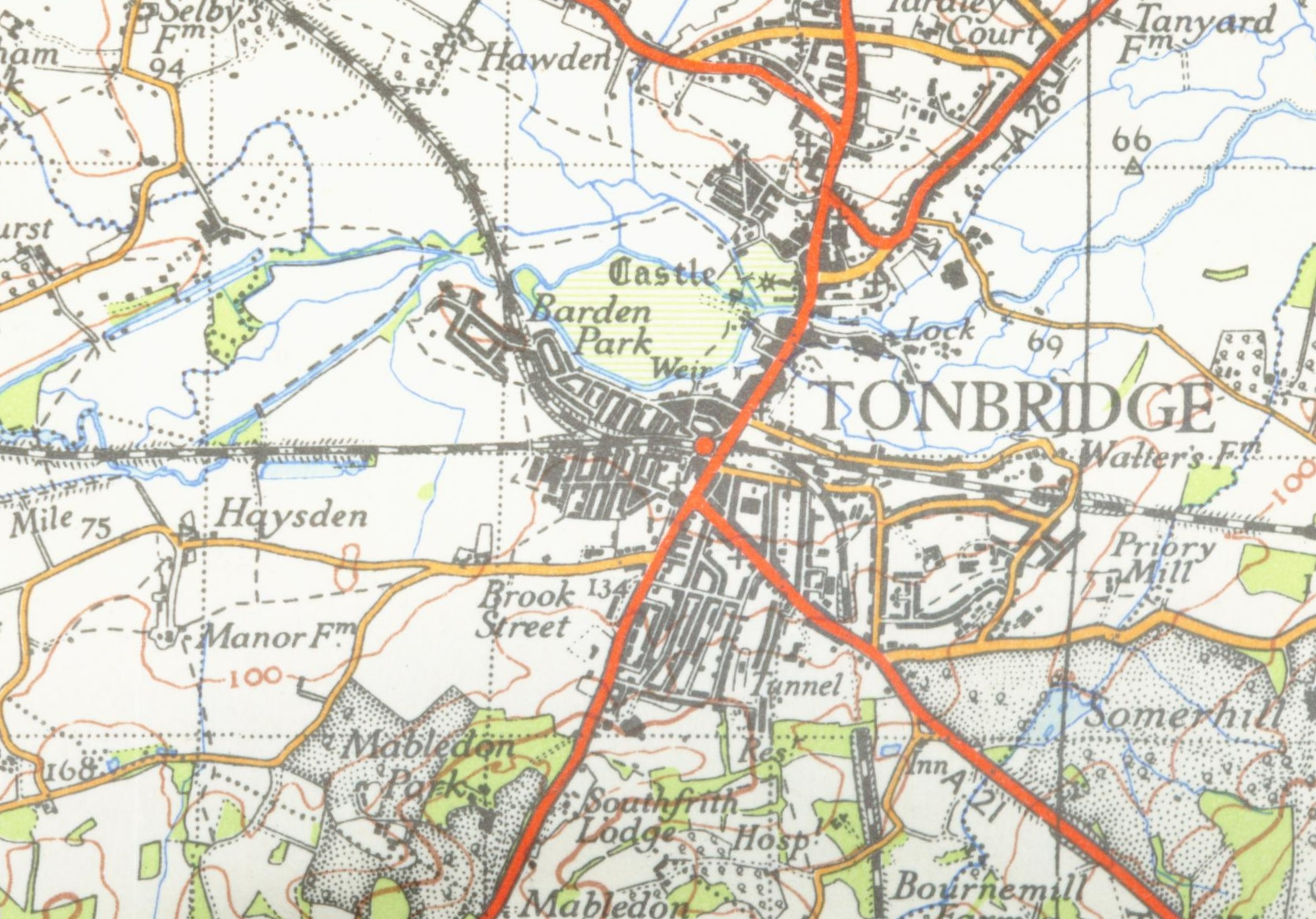
A map of Tonbridge from 1946

During the March 1880 parliamentary election, Tonbridge was the scene of a riot. On the announcement of the results, several thousand people started to hurl stones and cobbles at each other in the High Street near the Rose and Crown Hotel. The county's Chief Constable Captain Ruskin, with over a hundred policemen, charged the crowds many times during the evening, only to end up as the target of the crowd, who started hurling stones and cobbles at them instead of each other. Many people, including twelve policemen, were seriously injured before the crowd finally dispersed at midnight.

The United Kingdom's first speeding fine was handed out by Tonbridge Petty Sessions court in 1896. The guilty driver was a Mr Walter Arnold of East Peckham, who was fined one shilling for speeding at 8 miles per hour (13 km/h) in a 2 mph (3 km/h) zone in Paddock Wood, in his Karl Benz powered car. Mr Arnold was apprehended by a policeman who had given chase on his bicycle.

During World War II a prisoner of war camp was built at the junction of Tudeley Lane and Pembury Road on land belonging to Somerhill House. It held German pilots who had been shot down, and captured Italian soldiers. After the war the camp was used as temporary housing for people made homeless by the Blitz. The site is now occupied by the Weald of Kent Girls' Grammar School.

Ruth Ellis, the last woman in the United Kingdom to be hanged, was married at the registry office in Tonbridge on 8 November 1950.

=== Securitas depot robbery ===
Tonbridge was the location of the largest cash theft in British criminal history. On 22 February 2006, over £53.1 million was stolen from the Securitas cash-handling depot in Vale Road to the east of the High Street. During the following police investigation, around half of the money was recovered. On 28 January 2008 five people were convicted at the Old Bailey.

== Governance ==
Tonbridge is in the county of Kent. After the Norman Conquest Richard fitz Gilbert acquired Tonbridge and the surrounding area, this district being known as the Lowy of Tunbridge. The lowy covered the approximate area of the later parishes of Tonbridge, Tonbridge Rural, Southborough, Hildenborough and Hadlow. The separate administration of the lowy continued until at least the 14th century, after which it became regarded in a similar way to the other hundreds of the county. In the 1894 local government reforms Tonbridge and Southborough became urban districts and the rest of the area became part of Tonbridge Rural District.

Since 1974 the town has been part of the local government district of Tonbridge and Malling, and is divided into the five local government wards of Cage Green and Angel, Castle, Higham, Judd, Trench and Vauxhall. These wards have 12 of the 48 seats on the Tonbridge and Malling Borough Council. As of May 2023, 6 of these seats were held by the Green Party, 3 by the Lib Dems and 3 by the once-dominant Conservatives. Tonbridge and Malling Borough Council is responsible for running local services, such as recreation, refuse collection and council housing; while Kent County Council is responsible for education, social services and trading standards. Both councils are involved in town planning and road maintenance.

Tonbridge is in the parliamentary constituency of Tonbridge, previously Tonbridge and Malling.

== Geography and environment ==
The town's development is shaped by the Medway valley and the railway lines, with development forming a rough 'hourglass' shape centred on the river and the castle. The residential areas north of the town centre include the mostly post-war Trench Wood and Cage Green (north of the town centre) and Higham Wood (north east). Areas in the south part of the town include the estates off Brook Street which have Radburn layouts (south west), the Victorian railway terraces around Douglas Road and Barden Park, and Vauxhall (to the south east). Barden Park was a larger house which was demolished in the 20th century.

In 2014 the Angel Community Garden was created to eliminate eyesores in the area, and encourage bees which are declining. The garden was put along the edge of Sainsbury's car park. It was formed in collaboration with Tonbridge Friends of the Earth and Tonbridge & Malling Borough Council. The project also received some support from some local shopkeepers and residents.

=== Flooding ===
Parts of Tonbridge are at risk of flooding. Significant flooding occurred in 1968, which led to the construction of the Leigh Barrier; and in 2013 which resulted in the Environment Agency building a 320-metre long flood defence along Avebury Avenue in 2015. Despite these measures, significant flooding occurred again in December 2019. The area to the west is retained as floodplain including Tonbridge Park.

=== Climate ===
Tonbridge experiences an oceanic climate (Köppen climate classification Cfb), like all of Kent, and similar to almost all of the United Kingdom. Temperatures all year round are mild, with a low amount of precipitation. Snow sometimes occurs in the winter. On 22 July 1868, the temperature was supposed to have reached 38.1 °C (100.6 °F), the British record until 2003. However, this temperature was later rejected as being around 2 °C (3.6 °F) too high.

== Economy ==
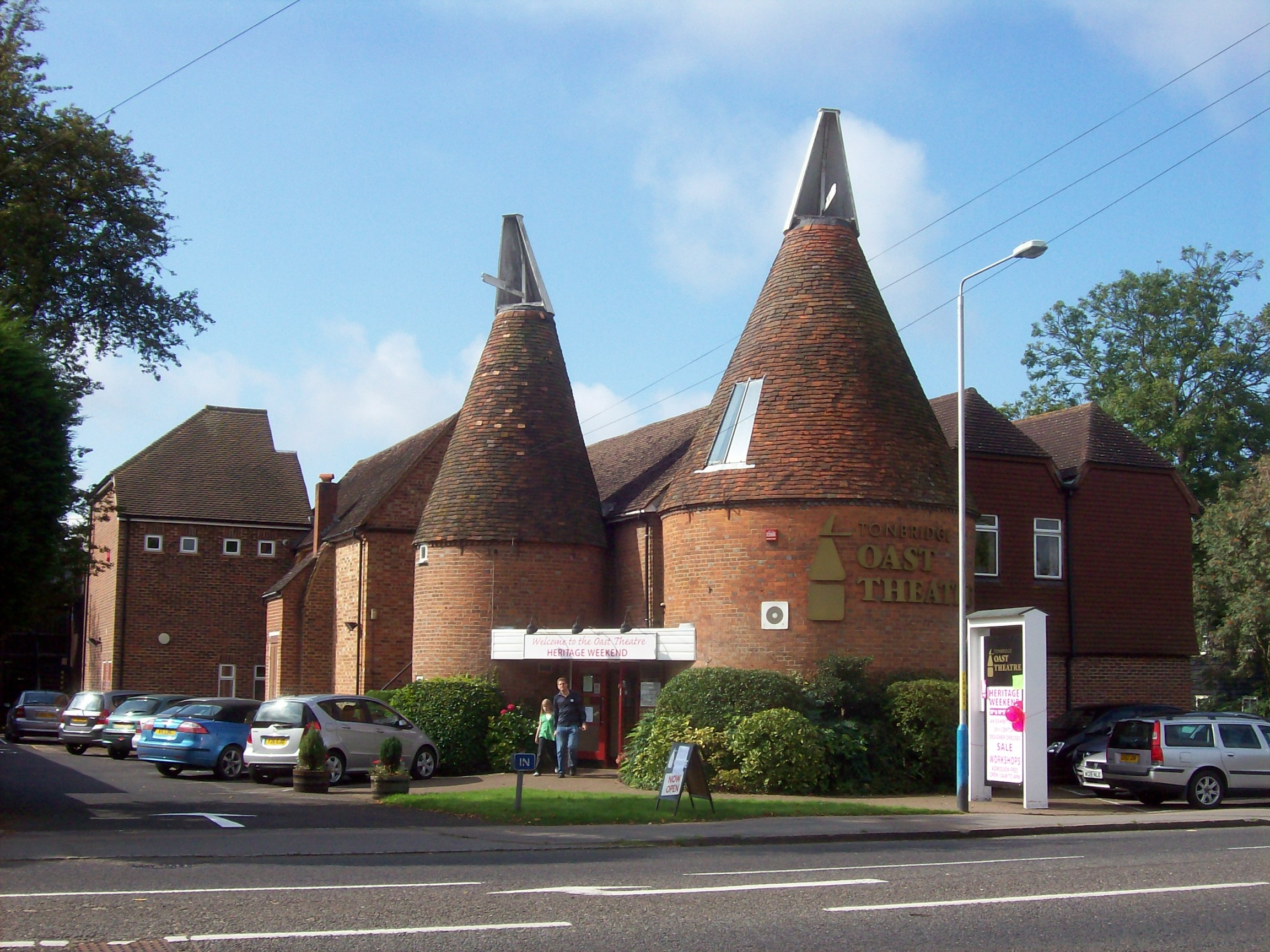
The Oast Theatre

Major industries include light engineering, printing and publishing, distribution and financial services. Tonbridge, together with its neighbour Tunbridge Wells, was designated by the South East Assembly as a Regional Hub.

The town has retained its 'market town' atmosphere and has attractions to visitors and residents alike. Sports facilities including an indoor/outdoor swimming pool, a leisure centre and a sports ground are all close to the town centre. Many of the facilities are provided or subsidised by the local authority.

Most of the town's shopping facilities are concentrated on the High Street, which runs for about 1 mile (2 km) through the town centre. The high street has bars, restaurants, estate agents, clothes shops, hairdressers, banks, charity shops, cafes, bakers, a butchers and a fishmongers. There are empty high street premises. There are high street chain stores that have tended to move to large shopping centres such as Tunbridge Wells. The Borough Council has published proposals to improve the town's shopping and leisure facilities.

During the early 20th century Tonbridge became the South East hub for plastic moulding / engineering and printing, with The Crystalate Gramophone Record Company, which claimed to be the oldest record producer in Britain.. Some manufacturing still remains in Tonbridge: Enalon Limited, founded in 1946, is the last remaining plastic moulder and toolmaker based in the town.

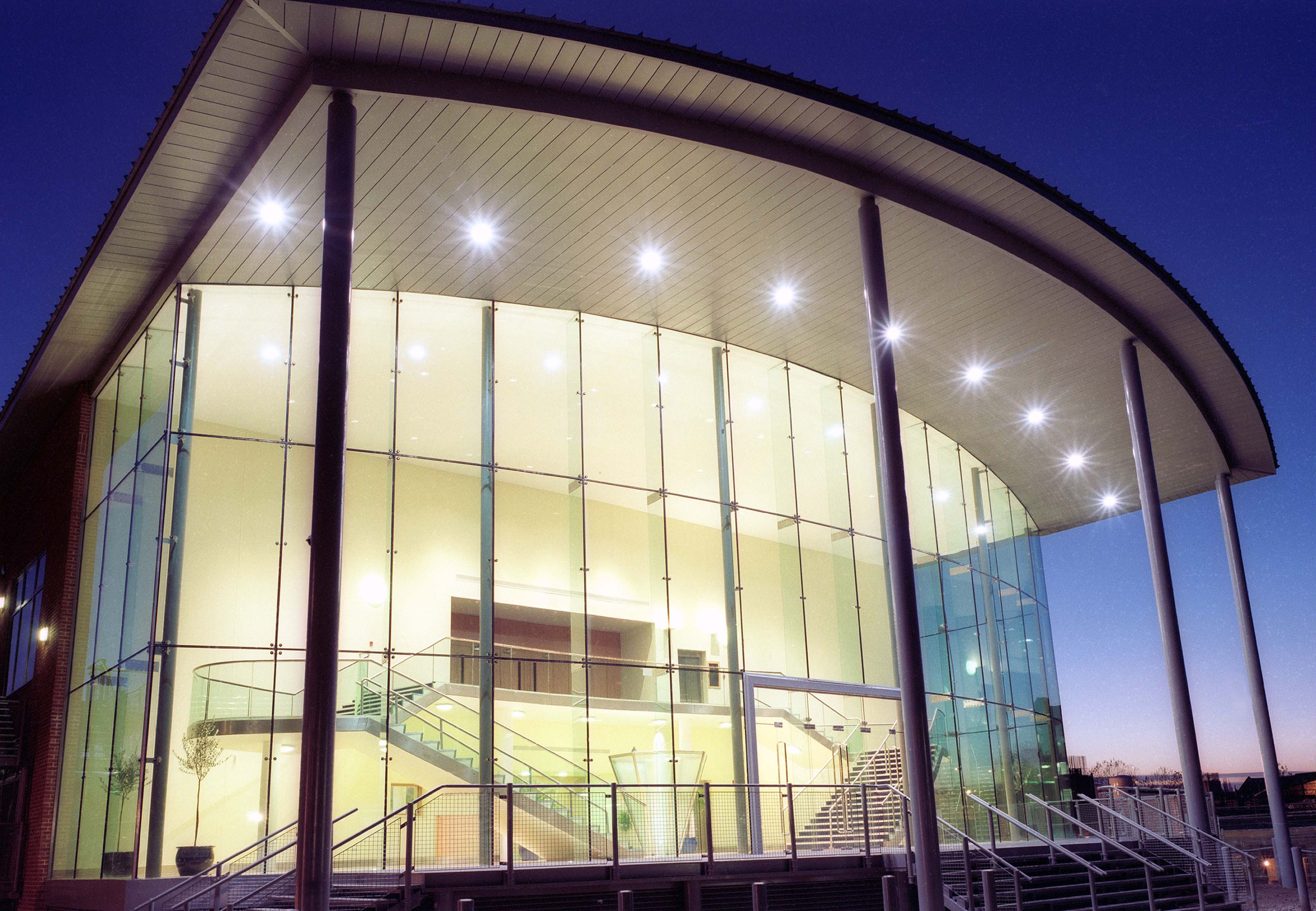
The River Centre

In 1999, Harvester Trust Tonbridge bought a derelict site on Medway Wharf Road, in the centre of Tonbridge. A £4 million building which can be used as a church, community centre and conference centre was given planning permission in March 2000. Work began in 2001. The River Centre was officially opened in January 2003. In August 2016, Hillsong Church purchased the building and is the current owner.

The police station, on Pembury Road, was previously the headquarters of the West Kent Police Division, prior to the West Division being again headquartered at Maidstone.

Royal Mail's TN postcode main sorting office is on Vale Road in the town.

Tonbridge is also the location of Carroty Wood, an outdoor activity and residential centre run by Rock UK, offering groups of young people the opportunity to try out a variety of outdoor activities.

A former oast house on the road to Hildenborough has been converted to a small theatre called the Oast Theatre.

Tonbridge Medical Group built a substantial new medical centre in 2020 to replace their ageing Pembury Road and Higham Lane sites.

== Transport ==
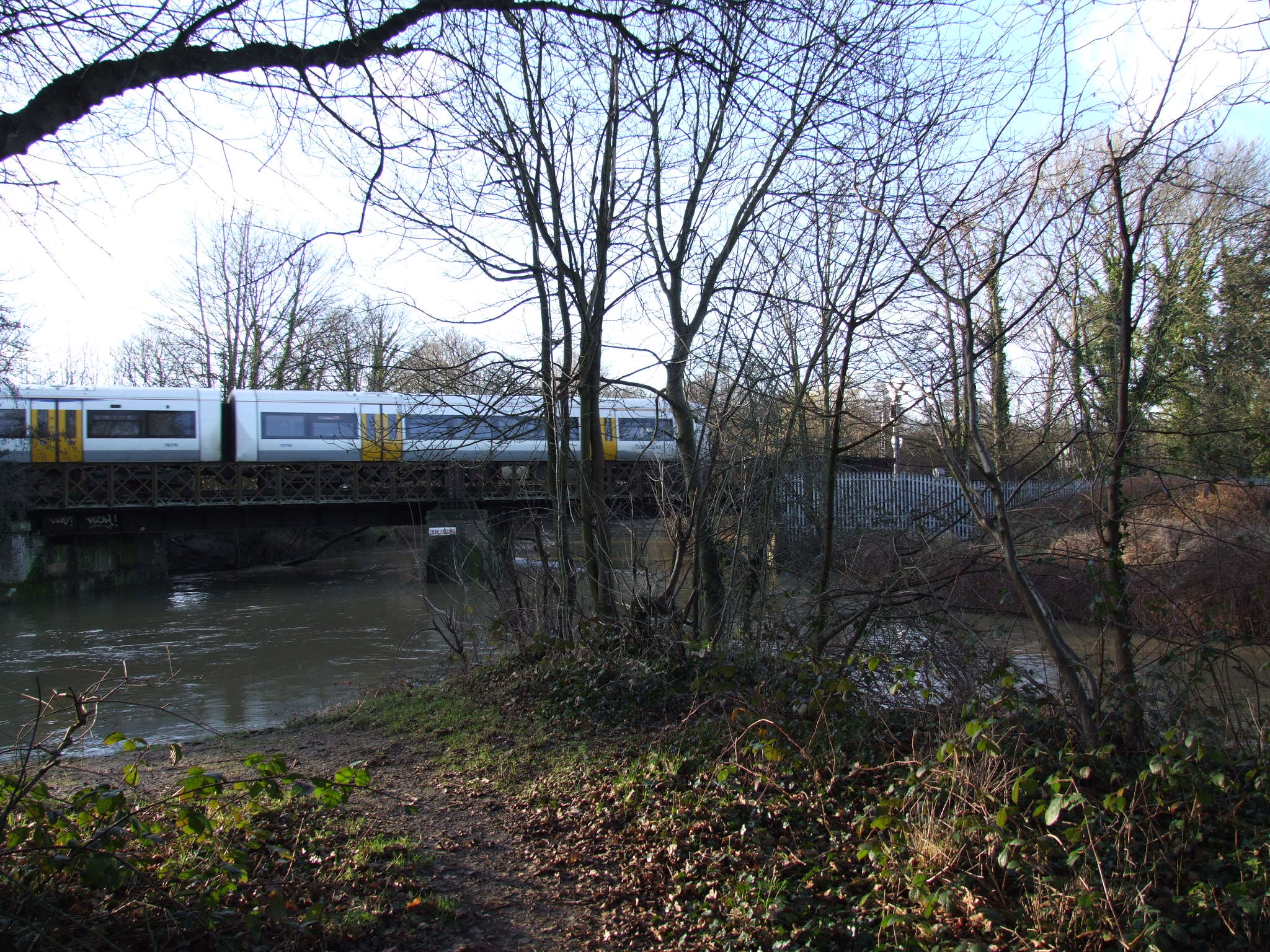
The South Eastern Main Line crossing the River Medway upstream of the Sports Ground

Tonbridge railway station is one of Kent's busiest with around 4.4 million passengers using it each year pre-Covid-19, and around 3.5 million passengers using it each year post-Covid-19. It is an important railway junction with lines to London, Ashford, Hastings and Redhill. The town is also served by the A21 trunk road between London and Hastings and the A26 between Maidstone and Brighton. It is also close to the M25 motorway.

Tonbridge is served by numerous bus routes, most of which are run by Arriva Southern Counties.

Dualing of the A21 from Castle Hill to Pembury, where a new regional hospital opened in 2011, has now been completed and opened in 2018.

Before World War I, aviation pioneers Frank Gooden and Richard Johnson tried to establish an airfield to the north of Tonbridge at Cage Green Fields, at the top of the ridge which The Ridgeway ascends, and east of Shipbourne Road. An accident is recorded as having occurred on 24 December 1913 at the airfield, although neither Gooden or Johnson was injured. The scheme was ended by the outbreak of war.

== Education ==
Tonbridge School, founded in 1553 by Sir Andrew Judde, is a major independent school for boys, which is in the centre of the town. Around 60% of the boys there are boarders, and live in the school's houses, which are all close to the school. The town is also home to several Grammar Schools, including The Judd School, Weald of Kent Grammar School and Tonbridge Grammar School. A number of Tonbridge's secondary schools have specialist status, including Tonbridge Grammar School for Maths and ICT, as well as Languages; Weald of Kent Grammar School for Girls, a specialist school for languages and science; the Judd School for Music with English and also now Science with Maths; Leigh Academy Tonbridge, formed from the joining of Hayesbrook Academy and Leigh Academies Trust, for both boys and girls, a specialist sports college; and Hillview School For Girls, with Performing Arts Status. Hugh Christie Technology College has IT expertise.

Further and higher education is available at North Kent College (formerly West Kent College) on Brook Street. There is also a small campus of the University of Kent.

Tonbridge has many primary schools including Hilden Grange School and infant nurseries/daycare.

== Sport and leisure ==
The 2007 Tour de France passed through the centre of Tonbridge on 8 July, as part of the first stage (London to Canterbury). The riders climbed Quarry Hill at the south of the town, a Grade 4 and the first King of the Mountains climb of the Tour.

The town is home to two cricket clubs: Cowdrey CC and Tonbridge CC. Cowdrey Cricket Club was founded as Tonbridge Printers in 1948. On the club's 50th anniversary in 1998, it was decided to make a name change in honour of Lord Colin Cowdrey of Tonbridge. Cowdrey Cricket Club has a junior section and academy, as well as two Saturday teams – the 1st XI playing in Division III of the Kent League, and the 2nd XI in Division IV. The club plays at the Swanmead Sports Ground. Tonbridge Cricket Club is the oldest established cricket club in Tonbridge. Its large secluded ground features a modern pavilion, offering facilities to club members and visitors alike. The club competes in the Kent Cricket League Division IV on a Saturday and plays friendly matches, under the banner of Tonbridge Exiles CC, on a Sunday. The club has a junior section.

Tonbridge Athletic Club which trains on the Tonbridge school track, is Kelly Holmes' former club. The Tonbridge Half Marathon has been held in September since 2011.

Tonbridge has a Rugby union club, Tonbridge Juddians Rugby Football club., often referred to as TJs. The 2009/10 season saw the club's first XV win promotion and go unbeaten in the league for the second year running, they played their rugby in 2010/11 in London 1. The senior men's section of the club fields five sides plus a Vets team. The club has two girls teams (Under 15 and 18), and a junior and mini section.

Tonbridge's football team, the Tonbridge Angels, play in the National League South – with the former manager of the England national football team, Roy Hodgson having played for them.

The town has a canoe club that has produced a number of Olympic participants, and a dinghy sailing club, the Tonbridge Town Sailing Club, which holds events at Haysden Country Park on the outskirts of the town.

Tonbridge Canoe Club was formed in 1977 to promote the various disciplines of canoeing from its base on the River Medway opposite Tonbridge Castle. The club meets every Saturday morning throughout the year, and on various weekday evenings for race training and general club sessions, the club has members actively participating in racing (sprint and marathon), touring, open canoeing and recreational paddling

Tonbridge Swimming Club is based at the Tonbridge swimming pool which has indoor and outdoor pools.

Tonbridge Baseball Club play in the town, after forming an adult team in 2000 from the junior team the Bobcats. The Bobcats were coached for many years by Tonbridge Baseball Club's president Margaret Borley MBE.

The town also has a history in Motorcycle Racing and both Tonbridge & District MCC and Tonbridge & Malling MCC held both national and International meeting at the nearby Collier Street venue. Collier Street was home to The Boarded Circuit, a Grasstrack and Longtrack motorcycle racing circuit which held two or three events each season, including the International Bonfire Burnup. The circuit was unique in being the only fully boarded permanent Grasstrack venue in the UK.

Tonbridge has a large number of amateur men's football teams with a number competing in the Sevenoaks & District Football League and the West Kent Sunday Football League. From the Sevenoaks League's there is: FC Revo, Roselands FC, Tonbridge Invicta FC & Woodlands FC. In the West Kent Sunday League there is: Artois United FC & Tonbridge Origin FC. Matthew Tingate broke the Tonbridge Amateur Men's Football record for own goals in a single season in 2021.

The Angel Centre is a gym and leisure centre built on the site of the former Angel sports ground. As well as a gym and exercise class facilities, it hosts community events, conferences and markets. It housed a cinema until 2017 and was also formerly a concert venue – The Stone Roses, The Orb and Primal Scream are among acts who performed there in the 1980s and 1990s.

Climate data for Tonbridge
Month	Jan	Feb	Mar	Apr	May	Jun	Jul	Aug	Sep	Oct	Nov	Dec	Year
Mean daily maximum °C (°F)	7.7 (45.9)	8.0 (46.4)	11.0 (51.8)	13.7 (56.7)	17.1 (62.8)	20.1 (68.2)	22.5 (72.5)	22.4 (72.3)	19.3 (66.7)	15.3 (59.5)	11.0 (51.8)	8.1 (46.6)	14.7 (58.5)
Daily mean °C (°F)	3.8 (38.8)	3.9 (39.0)	6.0 (42.8)	7.9 (46.2)	11.3 (52.3)	14.1 (57.4)	16.5 (61.7)	16.3 (61.3)	13.6 (56.5)	10.1 (50.2)	6.5 (43.7)	4.7 (40.5)	9.5 (49.1)
Mean daily minimum °C (°F)	1.0 (33.8)	0.8 (33.4)	2.4 (36.3)	3.5 (38.3)	6.7 (44.1)	9.5 (49.1)	11.8 (53.2)	11.4 (52.5)	9.0 (48.2)	6.3 (43.3)	3.3 (37.9)	1.5 (34.7)	5.6 (42.1)
Average precipitation mm (inches)	73.3 (2.89)	48.3 (1.90)	49.3 (1.94)	49.4 (1.94)	53.4 (2.10)	45.3 (1.78)	46.9 (1.85)	52.6 (2.07)	53.9 (2.12)	85.4 (3.36)	76.2 (3.00)	75.5 (2.97)	709.5 (27.93)
Mean monthly sunshine hours	47.0	74.5	109.3	162.4	200.6	202.5	218.8	202.3	143.4	110.8	61.1	34.5	1,567.2
Source 1:
Source 2:

== Notable people ==
- Harry Andrews (1911–1989), actor, was born in Tonbridge
- Steve Chalke (born 1955), Christian activist and founder of the Oasis Charitable Trust was minister at Tonbridge Baptist Church for four years before founding the trust in 1985
- Michael Farmer, Baron Farmer (born 1944), businessman and life peer in the House of Lords, was born in Tonbridge
- Reginald Punnett (1875–1967), geneticist, was born in Tonbridge
- Frank Woolley (1887–1978), Kent and England cricketer, was born and raised in Tonbridge.

== Twin towns ==
Tonbridge is twinned with: Le Puy-en-Velay, Haute-Loire, France Heusenstamm, Hesse, Germany

== See also ==
- Listed buildings in Tonbridge
