= Tonbridge Castle =

Grade I listed castle in the United Kingdom

- Kent, England
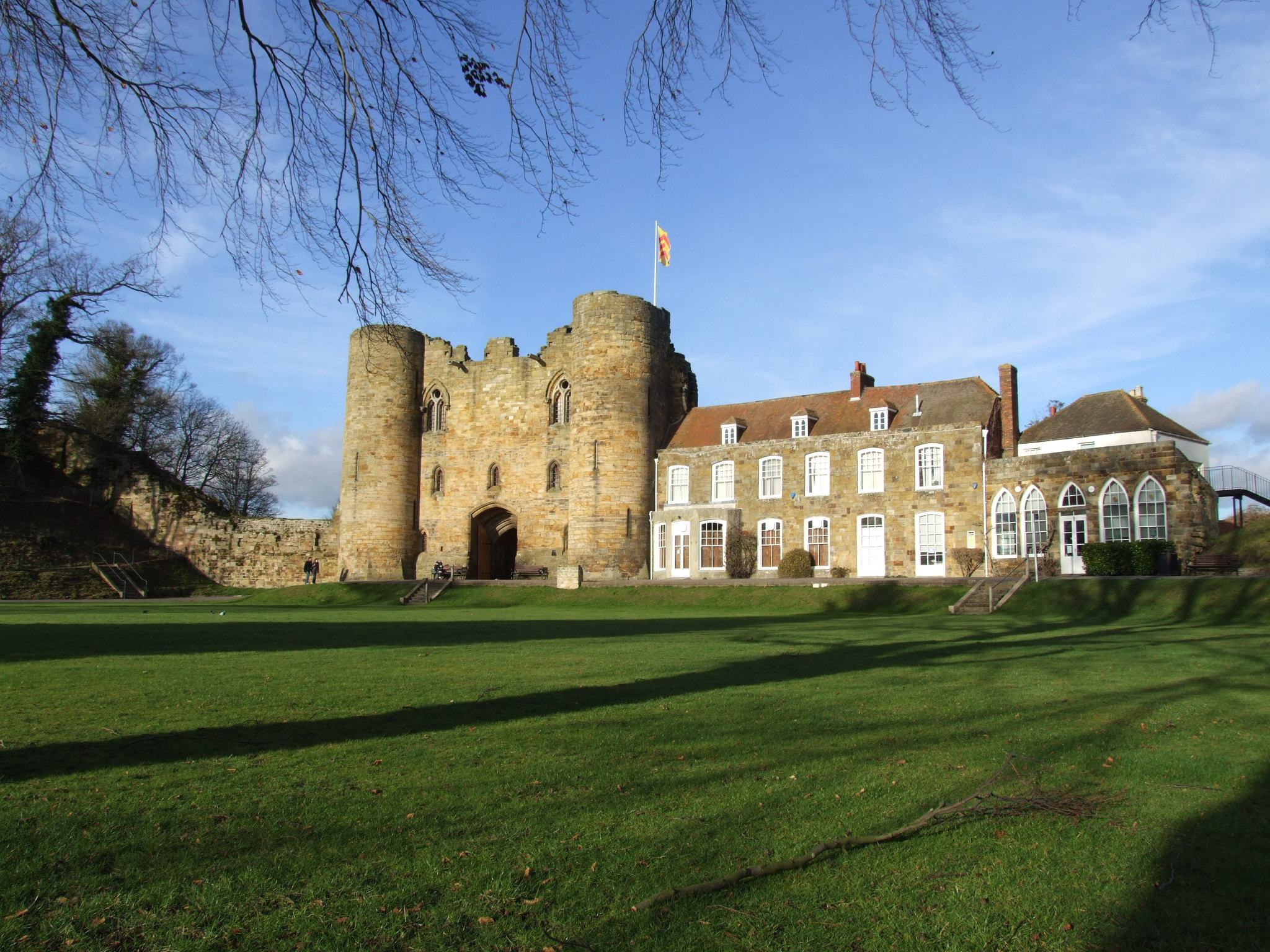
- Tonbridge Castle Gatehouse and the mansion (from the south)

Site information
- Type: Motte and bailey, with later shell keep
- Owner: Tonbridge and Malling Borough Council
- Open to the public: Yes
- Condition: The motte and gatehouse survive

Location
- Shown within Kent
- Location within Kent
- Coordinates: 51.1971°N 0.2721°E
- Grid reference: grid reference TQ58854666

Site history
- Materials: Stone
- Battles/wars: De Clare rebellion, 1088

Tonbridge Castle is a 13th century castle situated in Tonbridge, Kent, England.

== Early history ==
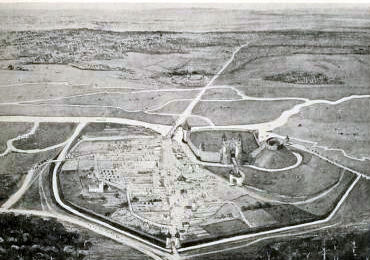
An 1896 reconstruction of Tonbridge Castle in the 13th century

Following the Norman Conquest, Richard Fitz Gilbert was granted land in Kent to guard the crossing of the River Medway. He erected a simple Motte-and-bailey castle on the site. To dig the moat and erect the motte 50,000 tonnes of earth were moved. In 1088, the de Clare family (descendants of Fitz Gilbert) rebelled against King William II. His army besieged the castle. After holding for two days the castle fell and as punishment the king had both the castle and the town of Tonbridge burnt to the ground. Before 1100, the de Clares replaced the wooden castle with a stone shell keep. This was reinforced during the thirteenth century, and in 1295 a stone wall was built around the town.

The twin-towered gatehouse was built by Richard de Clare, third Earl of Hertford or his son Gilbert. Construction of the gatehouse took 30 years, being completed in 1260. The gatehouse shares many similarities with the ones at Caerphilly Castle built by Gilbert in 1268–1271. The great seal of England was temporarily kept here during one of Edward I's visits to France.

The castle was not lived in between 1521 and the late 18th century, except for a short period during the civil war. The mansion was added in 1793. Both castle and mansion are Grade I listed buildings.

== Modern history ==
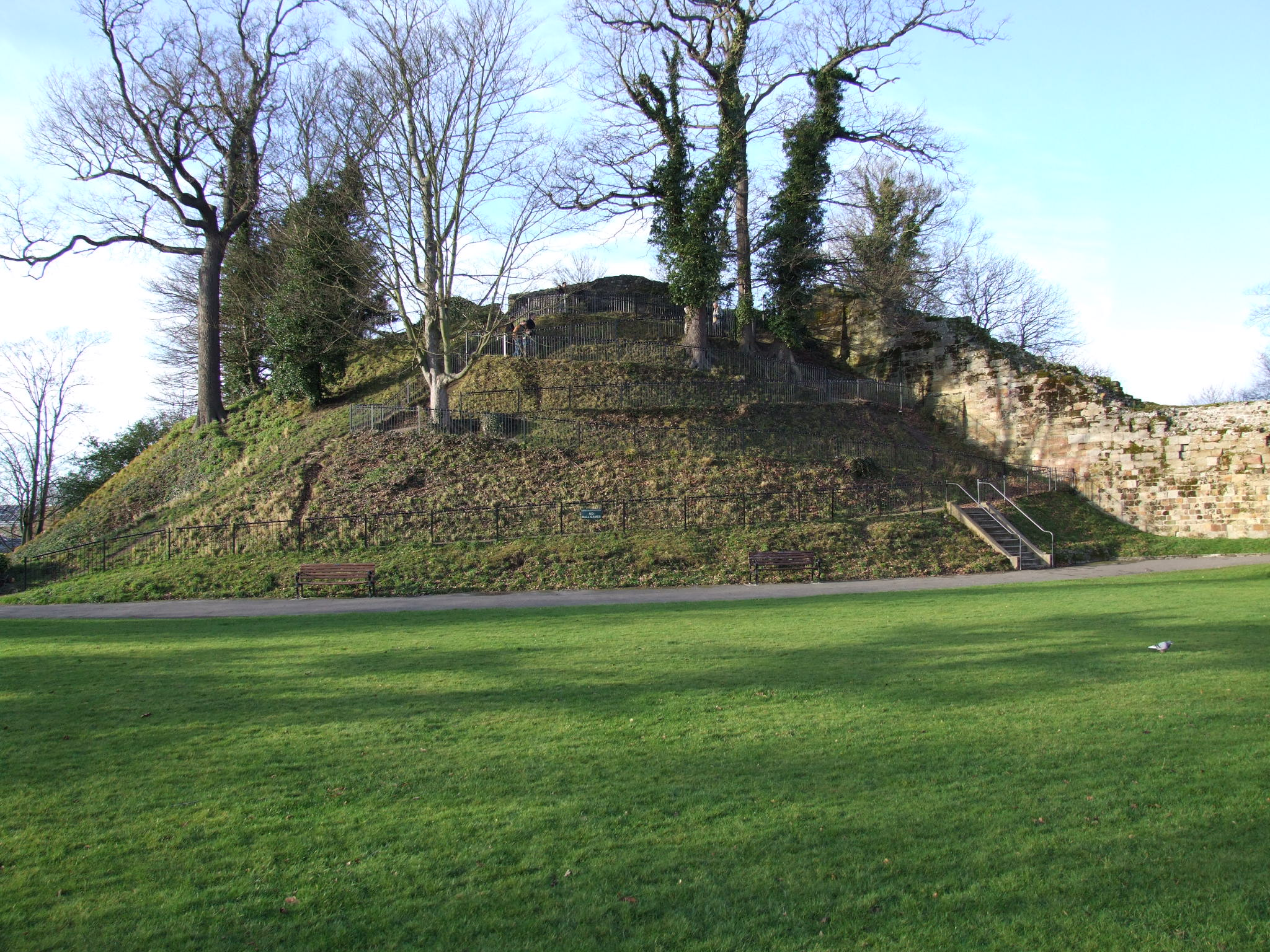
The motte, which was surmounted by a wooden keep and later a twin walled shell keep.

The site was purchased by the local council in 1900, who now use the mansion as offices, and who made the grounds a public park.

The castle is also the start of a 6-mile cycle ride to Penshurst Place called The Tudor Trail.

== See also ==
- Castles in Great Britain and Ireland
- List of castles in England
