= List of schools in Kent =

This is a list of schools in Kent, England.

== State-funded schools ==
=== Primary schools ===
- Adisham CE Primary School, Adisham
- Aldington Primary School, Aldington
- All Souls' CE Primary School, Folkestone
- Allington Primary School, Maidstone
- Amherst School, Riverhead
- The Anthony Roper Primary School, Eynsford
- Archbishop Courtenay Primary School, Tovil
- Ash Cartwright and Kelsey CE Primary School, Ash
- Ashford Oaks Community Primary School, Ashford
- Ashford St Mary's CE Primary School, Ashford
- Aycliffe Community Primary School, Dover
- Aylesham Primary School, Aylesham
- Bapchild and Tonge CE Primary School, Bapchild
- Barham CE Primary School, Barham
- Barming Primary School, Barming
- Barton Junior School, Dover
- Bean Primary School, Bean
- Bearsted Primary Academy, Weavering
- Beaver Green Primary School, Ashford
- Benenden CE Primary School, Benenden
- Bethersden Primary School, Bethersden
- Bidborough CE Primary School, Bidborough
- Birchington CE Primary School, Birchington-on-Sea
- Bishop Chavasse Primary School, Tonbridge
- Bishops Down Primary School, Royal Tunbridge Wells
- Blean Primary School, Blean
- Bobbing Village School, Bobbing
- Bodsham CE Primary School, Bodsham
- Borden CE Primary School, Borden
- Borough Green Primary School, Borough Green
- Boughton Monchelsea Primary School, Boughton Monchelsea
- Boughton-under-Blean and Dunkirk Primary School, Boughton under Blean
- Brabourne CE Primary School, Brabourne
- Bredgar CE Primary School, Bredgar
- Bredhurst CE Primary School, Bredhurst
- Brenchley and Matfield CE Primary School, Brenchley
- The Brent Primary School, Stone
- Brenzett CE Primary School, Brenzett
- Bridge and Patrixbourne CE Primary School, Bridge
- Broadwater Down Primary School, Royal Tunbridge Wells
- Bromstone Primary School, Broadstairs
- Brook Community Primary School, Brook
- Brookfield Infant School, Larkfield
- Brookfield Junior School, Larkfield
- Brookland CE Primary School, Brookland
- Brunswick House Primary School, Maidstone
- Burham CE Primary School, Burham
- Bysing Wood Primary School, Faversham
- Cage Green Primary School, Tonbridge
- Callis Grange Nursery and Infant School, Broadstairs
- The Canterbury Primary School, Canterbury
- Canterbury Road Primary School, Sittingbourne
- Capel Primary School, Five Oak Green
- Capel-le-Ferne Primary School, Capel-le-Ferne
- Castle Hill Community Primary School, Folkestone
- Cecil Road Primary and Nursery School, Northfleet
- Challock Primary School, Challock
- Chantry Community Academy, Gravesend
- Charing Primary School, Charing
- Charlton CE Primary School, Dover
- Chartham Primary School, Chartham
- Cheriton Primary School, Folkestone
- Cherry Orchard Primary Academy, Ebbsfleet Valley
- Chevening St Botolph's CE Primary School, Chipstead
- Chiddingstone CE School, Chiddingstone
- Chilham St Mary's CE Primary School, Chilham
- Chilmington Green Primary School, Chilmington Green
- Chilton Primary School, Ramsgate
- Chislet CE Primary School, Chislet
- Christ Church CE Junior School, Ramsgate
- Christ Church CE Primary Academy, Folkestone
- Churchill CE Primary School, Westerham
- The Churchill School, Hawkinge
- Claremont Primary School, Royal Tunbridge Wells
- Cliftonville Primary School, Cliftonville
- Cobham Primary School, Cobham
- Colliers Green CE Primary School, Colliers Green
- Copperfield Academy, Northfleet
- Coxheath Primary School, Coxheath
- Cranbrook CE Primary School, Cranbrook
- The Craylands School, Swanscombe
- Crockenhill Primary School, Crockenhill
- Crockham Hill CE Primary School, Crockham Hill
- Culverstone Green Primary School, Meopham
- Dame Janet Primary Academy, Ramsgate
- Dartford Bridge Community Primary School, Dartford
- Dartford Primary Academy, Dartford
- Davington Primary School, Davington
- Deal Parochial CE Primary School, Deal
- The Discovery School, Kings Hill
- Ditton CE Junior School, Ditton
- Ditton Infant School, Ditton
- Dover St Mary's CE Primary School, Dover
- The Downs CE Primary School, Walmer
- Downs View Infant School, Kennington
- Downsview Community Primary School, Swanley
- Drapers Mills Primary Academy, Margate
- Dunton Green Primary School, Dunton Green
- Dymchurch Primary School, Dymchurch
- East Farleigh Primary School, East Farleigh
- East Peckham Primary School, East Peckham
- East Stour Primary School, Willesborough
- Eastchurch CE Primary School, Eastchurch
- Eastling Primary School, Eastling
- Eastry CE Primary School, Eastry
- Ebbsfleet Green Primary School, Ebbsfleet Valley
- Edenbridge Primary School, Edenbridge
- Egerton CE Primary School, Egerton
- Elham CE Primary School, Elham
- Ellington Infant School, Ramsgate
- Ethelbert Road Primary School, Faversham
- Eythorne Elvington Primary School, Eythorne
- Fawkham CE Primary School, Fawkham
- Finberry Primary School, Finberry
- Fleetdown Primary Academy, Darenth
- Folkestone Primary, Folkestone
- Folkestone St Martin's CE Primary School, Folkestone
- Folkestone St Mary's CE Primary Academy, Folkestone
- Folkestone St Peter's CE Primary School, Folkestone
- Fordcombe CE Primary School, Fordcombe
- Four Elms Primary School, Four Elms
- Frittenden CE Primary School, Frittenden
- Furley Park Primary School, Kingsnorth
- Garlinge Primary School, Margate
- The Gateway Primary Academy, Dartford
- Goat Lees Primary School, Kennington
- Godinton Primary School, Ashford
- Goodnestone CE Primary School, Goodnestone
- Goudhurst and Kilndown CE Primary School, Goudhurst
- Graveney Primary School, Graveney
- Great Chart Primary School, Great Chart
- Greatstone Primary School, Greatstone-on-Sea
- Green Park Community Primary School, Buckland
- Greenfields Community Primary School, Shepway
- Greenlands Primary School, Darenth
- Grove Park Primary School, Sittingbourne
- Guston CE Primary School, Guston
- Hadlow Primary School, Hadlow
- Halfway Houses Primary School, Halfway Houses
- Halstead Community Primary School, Halstead
- Hampton Primary School, Herne Bay
- Hamstreet Primary Academy, Hamstreet
- Harcourt Primary School, Folkestone
- Harrietsham CE Primary School, Harrietsham
- Hartley Primary Academy, Hartley
- Hartlip CE Primary School, Hartlip
- Hawkhurst CE Primary School, Hawkhurst
- Hawkinge Primary School, Hawkinge
- Headcorn Primary School, Ashford
- Herne Bay Infant School, Herne Bay
- Herne Bay Junior School, Herne Bay
- Herne CE Infant School, Herne Bay
- Herne CE Junior School, Herne Bay
- Hernhill CE Primary School, Hernhill
- Hever CE Primary School, Hever
- Hextable Primary School, Hextable
- High Firs Primary School, Swanley
- High Halden CE Primary School, High Halden
- Higham Primary School, Higham
- Hildenborough CE Primary School, Hildenborough
- Hoath Primary School, Hoath
- Hollingbourne Primary School, Hollingbourne
- The Holy Family RC Primary School, Park Wood
- Holy Trinity CE Primary School, Dartford
- Holy Trinity CE Primary School, Gravesend
- Holywell Primary School, Upchurch
- Horizon Primary Academy, Swanley
- Hornbeam Primary School, Deal
- Horsmonden Primary Academy, Horsmonden
- Horton Kirby CE Primary School, Horton Kirby
- Hunton CE Primary School, Hunton
- Hythe Bay CE Primary School, Hythe
- Ide Hill CE Primary School, Ide Hill
- Ightham Primary School, Ightham
- Istead Rise Primary School, Northfleet
- Iwade School, Iwade
- John Mayne CE Primary School, Biddenden
- John Wallis Academy, Ashford
- The John Wesley CE/Methodist Primary School, Singleton
- Joy Lane Primary School, Whitstable
- Joydens Wood Infant School, Wilmington
- Joydens Wood Junior School, Wilmington
- Jubilee Primary School, Maidstone
- Kemsing Primary School, Kemsing
- Kemsley Primary Academy, Kemsley
- Kennington CE Academy, Kennington
- Kings Farm Primary School, Gravesend
- Kings Hill Primary School, Kings Hill
- Kingsdown and Ringwould CE Primary School, Kingsdown
- Kingsnorth CE Primary School, Kingsnorth
- Kingswood Primary School, Kingswood
- Knockhall Primary School, Greenhithe
- Laddingford St Mary's CE Primary School, Laddingford
- Lady Boswell's CE Primary School, Sevenoaks
- Lady Joanna Thornhill Endowed Primary School, Wye
- Lamberhurst St Mary's CE Primary School, Lamberhurst
- Langafel CE Primary School, Longfield
- Langdon Primary School, East Langdon
- Langley Park Primary Academy, Maidstone
- Langton Green Primary School, Langton Green
- Lansdowne Primary School, Sittingbourne
- Lawn Primary School, Northfleet
- Leeds and Broomfield CE Primary School, Leeds
- Leigh Primary School, Leigh
- Lenham Primary School, Lenham
- Leybourne St Peter and St Paul CE Primary Academy, Leybourne
- Littlebourne CE Primary School, Littlebourne
- Long Mead Community Primary School, Tonbridge
- Loose Primary School, Maidstone
- Lower Halstow Primary School, Lower Halstow
- Luddenham School, Luddenham
- Lunsford Primary School, Larkfield
- Lydd Primary School, Lydd
- Lydden Primary School, Lydden
- Lyminge CE Primary School, Lyminge
- Lympne CE Primary School, Lympne
- Lynsted and Norton Primary School, Lynsted
- Madginford Primary School, Bearsted
- Maidstone St John's CE Primary School, Grove Green
- Maidstone St Michael's CE Junior School, Maidstone
- Manor Community Primary School, Swanscombe
- Marden Primary Academy, Marden
- Margate Holy Trinity and St John's CE Primary School, Margate
- Martello Primary, Folkestone
- Maypole Primary School, Dartford
- Meopham Community Academy, Meopham
- Mereworth Community Primary School, Mereworth
- Mersham Primary School, Mersham
- Milstead and Frinsted CE Primary School, Milstead
- Milton Court Primary Academy, Milton Regis
- Minster CE Primary School, Minster-in-Thanet
- Minster-in-Sheppey Primary School, Minster
- Minterne Junior School, Sittingbourne
- Molehill Primary Academy, Maidstone
- Monkton CE Primary School, Monkton
- More Park RC Primary School, West Malling
- Morehall Primary School, Folkestone
- Mundella Primary School, Folkestone
- New Ash Green Primary School, New Ash Green
- Newington CE Primary School, Newington
- Newington Community Primary School, Ramsgate
- Newlands Primary School, Ramsgate
- Nonington CE Primary School, Nonington
- North Borough Junior School, Maidstone
- Northbourne CE Primary School, Northbourne
- Northdown Primary School, Margate
- Oakfield Primary Academy, Dartford
- The Oaks Infant School, Sittingbourne
- Oaks Primary Academy, Maidstone
- Offham Primary School, Offham
- Ospringe CE Primary School, Ospringe
- Otford Primary School, Otford
- Our Lady of Hartley RC Primary School, Hartley
- Our Lady's RC Primary School, Dartford
- Paddock Wood Primary Academy, Paddock Wood
- Painters Ash Primary School, Northfleet
- Palace Wood Primary School, Allington
- Palm Bay Primary School, Cliftonville
- Palmarsh Primary School, Palmarsh
- Park Way Primary School, Maidstone
- Parkside Community Primary School, Canterbury
- Pembury School, Pembury
- Penshurst CE Primary School, Penshurst
- Petham Primary School, Petham
- Phoenix Community Primary School, Kennington
- Pilgrims' Way Primary School, Canterbury
- Platt CE Primary School, St Mary's Platt
- Platts Heath Primary School, Platts Heath
- Plaxtol Primary School, Plaxtol
- Pluckley CE Primary School, Pluckley
- Preston Primary School, Preston
- Priory Fields School, Dover
- Priory Infant School, Ramsgate
- Queenborough School, Queenborough
- Ramsgate Arts Primary School, Ramsgate
- Ramsgate Holy Trinity CE Primary School, Broadstairs
- Reculver CE Primary School, Reculver
- Regis Manor Primary School, Milton Regis
- Repton Manor Primary School, Ashford
- Richmond Academy, Sheerness
- River Mill Primary School, Dartford
- River Primary School, River
- Riverhead Infants' School, Riverhead
- Riverview Primary Academy, Gravesend
- Rodmersham School, Rodmersham Green
- Rolvenden Primary School, Rolvenden
- Rose Street Primary School, Sheerness
- Roseacre Junior School, Bearsted
- Rosherville CE Academy, Northfleet
- Royal Rise Primary School, Tonbridge
- Rusthall St Paul's CE Primary School, Rusthall
- Ryarsh Primary School, Ryarsh
- St Alphege CE Infant School, Whitstable
- St Anselm's RC Primary School, Temple Hill
- St Augustine's RC Primary School, Hythe
- St Augustine's RC Primary School, Royal Tunbridge Wells
- St Barnabas CE Primary School, Royal Tunbridge Wells
- St Bartholomew's RC Primary School, Swanley
- St Botolph's CE Primary School, Northfleet
- St Clement's CE Primary School, Sheerness
- St Crispin's Infant School, Westgate-on-Sea
- St Eanswythe's CE Primary School, Folkestone
- St Edward's RC Primary School, Sheerness
- St Edmund's CE Primary School, West Kingsdown
- St Ethelbert's RC Primary School, Ramsgate
- St Francis' RC Primary School, Maidstone
- St George's CE Foundation School, Broadstairs
- St George's CE Primary School, Sheerness
- St George's CE Primary School, Wrotham
- St George's CE School, Gravesend
- St Gregory's RC Primary School, Margate
- St James' CE Primary School, Royal Tunbridge Wells
- St James the Great Academy, East Malling
- St John's CE Primary School, Canterbury
- St John's CE Primary School, Royal Tunbridge Wells
- St John's CE Primary School, Sevenoaks
- St John's RC Primary School, Gravesend
- St Joseph's RC Primary School, Aylesham
- St Joseph's RC Primary School, Broadstairs
- St Joseph's RC Primary School, Northfleet
- St Katharine's CE Primary School, Knockholt
- St Katherine's School, Snodland
- St Laurence in Thanet CE Junior School, Ramsgate
- St Lawrence CE Primary School, Seal Chart
- St Margaret Clitherow RC Primary School, Tonbridge
- St Margaret's CE School, Marden
- St Margaret's-at-Cliffe Primary School, St Margaret's at Cliffe
- St Mark's CE Primary School, Eccles
- St Mark's CE Primary School, Royal Tunbridge Wells
- St Martin's School, Dover
- St Mary of Charity CE Primary School, Faversham
- St Mary's CE Primary School, Swanley
- St Mary's RC Primary School, Deal
- St Mary's RC Primary School, Whitstable
- St Matthew's CE Primary School, High Brooms
- St Michael's CE Infant School, Maidstone
- St Michael's CE Primary School, St Michaels
- St Mildred's Infant School, Broadstairs
- St Nicholas at Wade CE Primary School, St Nicholas-at-Wade
- St Nicholas CE Primary School, New Romney
- St Pauls' CE Primary School, Swanley
- St Paul's Infant School, Maidstone
- St Peter-in-Thanet CE Junior School, Broadstairs
- St Peter's CE Primary School, Aylesford
- St Peter's CE Primary School, Royal Tunbridge Wells
- St Peter's Methodist Primary School, Canterbury
- St Peter's RC Primary School, Sittingbourne
- St Richard's RC Primary School, Dover
- St Saviour's CE Junior School, Westgate-on-Sea
- St Simon of England C Primary school, Ashford
- St Stephen's Infant School, Canterbury
- St Stephen's Junior School, Canterbury
- St Teresa's RC Primary School, Ashford
- St Thomas' RC Primary School, Canterbury
- St Thomas' RC Primary School, Sevenoaks
- Salmestone Primary School, Margate
- Saltwood CE Primary School, Saltwood
- Sandgate Primary School, Folkestone
- Sandhurst Primary School, Sandhurst
- Sandling Primary School, Penenden Heath
- Sandown Primary School, Deal
- Sandwich Infant School, Sandwich
- Sandwich Junior School, Sandwich
- Seabrook CE Primary School, Seabrook
- Seal CE Primary School, Seal
- Sedley's CE Primary School, Southfleet
- Sellindge Primary School, Sellindge
- Selling CE Primary School, Selling
- Selsted CE Primary School, Selsted
- Senacre Wood Primary School, Maidstone
- Sevenoaks Primary School, Sevenoaks
- Shatterlocks Infant School, Dover
- Shears Green Infant School, Northfleet
- Shears Green Junior School, Northfleet
- Sheldwich Primary School, Sheldwich
- Shipbourne School, Shipbourne
- Sholden CE Primary School, Sholden
- Shoreham Village School, Shoreham
- Shorne CE Primary School, Shorne
- Sibertswold CE Primary School, Shepherdswell
- Singlewell Primary School, Gravesend
- Sissinghurst CE Primary School, Sissinghurst
- Skinners' Kent Primary School, Royal Tunbridge Wells
- Slade Primary School, Tonbridge
- Smarden Primary School, Smarden
- Smeeth Community Primary School, Smeeth
- Snodland CE Primary School, Snodland
- South Avenue Primary School, Sittingbourne
- South Borough Primary School, Maidstone
- Southborough CE Primary School, Southborough
- Speldhurst CE Primary School, Speldhurst
- Springhead Park Primary School, Northfleet
- Staplehurst School, Staplehurst
- Stella Maris RC Primary School, Folkestone
- Stelling Minnis CE Primary School, Stelling Minnis
- Stocks Green Primary School, Hildenborough
- Stone St Mary's CE Primary School, Greenhithe
- Stowting CE Primary School, Stowting
- Sturry CE Primary School, Sturry
- Sundridge and Brasted CE Primary School, Sundridge
- Sunny Bank Primary School, Murston
- Sussex Road Community Primary School, Tonbridge
- Sutton Valence Primary School, Sutton Valence
- Sutton-at-Hone CE Primary School, Sutton-at-Hone
- Swalecliffe Community Primary School, Swalecliffe
- Temple Ewell CE Primary School, Temple Ewell
- Temple Grove Academy, Royal Tunbridge Wells
- Temple Hill Primary Academy, Temple Hill
- Tenterden CE Junior School, Tenterden
- Tenterden Infant School, Tenterden
- Teynham Parochial CE Primary School, Teynham
- Thistle Hill Academy, Minster
- Thornden Wood Primary School, Herne Bay
- Thurnham CE Infant School, Bearsted
- Tiger Primary School, Maidstone
- Tree Tops Primary Academy, Park Wood
- Trottiscliffe CE Primary School, Trottiscliffe
- Tunbury Primary School, Walderslade
- Tunstall CE Primary School, Tunstall
- Tymberwood Academy, Gravesend
- Ulcombe CE Primary School, Ulcombe
- Upton Junior School, Broadstairs
- Vale View Community School, Dover
- Valley Invicta Primary School Aylesford, Aylesford
- Victoria Road Primary School Ashford, Ashford
- Valley Invicta Primary School East Borough, Maidstone
- Valley Invicta Primary School Holborough Lakes, Snodland
- Valley Invicta Primary School King's Hill, Kings Hill
- Valley Invicta Primary School Leybourne, Leybourne
- Vigo Village School, Vigo Village
- Warden House Primary School, Deal
- Water Meadows Primary School, Hersden
- Wateringbury CE Primary School, Wateringbury
- Weald Community Primary School, Sevenoaks Weald
- The Wells Free School, Royal Tunbridge Wells
- Wentworth Primary School, Dartford
- West Borough Primary School, Maidstone
- West Hill Primary Academy, Dartford
- West Malling CE Primary School, West Malling
- West Minster Primary School, Sheerness
- Westcourt Primary School, Gravesend
- Westgate Primary School, Dartford
- Westlands Primary School, Sittingbourne
- Westmeads Community Infant School, Whitstable
- White Cliffs Primary School, Dover
- White Oak Primary School, Swanley
- Whitehill Primary School, Gravesend
- Whitfield Aspen School, Whitfield
- Whitstable and Seasalter CE Junior School, Whitstable
- Whitstable Junior School, Whitstable
- Wickhambreaux CE Primary School, Wickhambreaux
- Willesborough Infant School, Willesborough
- Willesborough Junior School, Willesborough
- Wilmington Primary School, Wilmington
- Wincheap Primary School, Canterbury
- Wingham Primary School, Wingham
- Wittersham CE Primary School, Wittersham
- Woodchurch CE Primary School, Woodchurch
- Woodlands Primary School, Tonbridge
- Worth Primary School, Worth
- Wouldham All Saints CE Primary School, Wouldham
- Wrotham Road Primary School, Gravesend
- Yalding St Peter and St Paul CE Primary School, Yalding

=== Non-selective secondary schools ===
- The Abbey School, Faversham
- Archbishop's School, Canterbury
- Astor Secondary School, Dover
- Aylesford School, Aylesford
- Barton Manor School, Canterbury
- Bennett Memorial Diocesan School, Tunbridge Wells
- Brockhill Park Performing Arts College, Saltwood
- The Canterbury Academy, Canterbury
- The Charles Dickens School, Broadstairs
- Chilmington Green School, Ashford
- Cornwallis Academy, Linton
- Dartford Science & Technology College, Dartford
- Dover Christ Church Academy, Dover
- Duke of York's Royal Military School, Guston
- The Ebbsfleet Academy, Swanscombe
- EKC Sheppey Secondary, Isle of Sheppey
- Folkestone Academy, Folkestone
- Fulston Manor School, Sittingbourne
- Goodwin Academy, Deal
- Hadlow Rural Community School, Hadlow
- Hartsdown Academy, Margate
- Hayesbrook School, Tonbridge
- Herne Bay High School, Herne Bay
- Hillview School for Girls, Tonbridge
- The Holmesdale School, Snodland
- Homewood School, Tenterden
- Hugh Christie School, Tonbridge
- John Wallis Academy, Ashford
- King Ethelbert School, Birchington-on-Sea
- Knole Academy, Sevenoaks
- Leigh Academy, Dartford
- Leigh Academy Minster Kent
- The Leigh UTC, Dartford
- The Lenham School, Lenham
- Longfield Academy, Longfield
- The Malling School, Malling
- The Maplesden Noakes School, Maidstone
- The Marsh Academy, New Romney
- Mascalls Academy, Paddock Wood
- Meopham School, Meopham
- New Line Learning Academy, Loose
- The North School, Ashford
- Northfleet School for Girls, Northfleet
- Northfleet Technology College, Northfleet
- Orchards Academy, Swanley
- The Royal Harbour Academy, Ramsgate
- St Anselm's Catholic School, Canterbury
- St Augustine Academy, Maidstone
- St Edmund's Catholic School, Dover
- St Georges CE Foundation School, Broadstairs
- St George's Church of England School, Gravesend
- St Gregory's Catholic School, Royal Tunbridge Wells
- St John's Catholic Comprehensive School, Gravesend
- St Simon Stock Catholic School, Maidstone
- Sandwich Technology School, Sandwich
- School of Science and Technology Maidstone, Maidstone
- The Sittingbourne School, Sittingbourne
- The Skinners' Kent Academy, Royal Tunbridge Wells
- Spires Academy, Canterbury
- Stone Lodge School, Stone
- Thamesview School, Gravesend
- The Towers School, Ashford
- Trinity School, Sevenoaks
- Turner Free School, Folkestone
- Ursuline College, Westgate-on-Sea
- Valley Park School, Maidstone
- Westlands School, Sittingbourne
- The Whitstable School, Whitstable
- Wilmington Academy, Wilmington
- Wrotham School, Wrotham
- Wye School, Wye

=== Grammar schools ===
- Barton Court Grammar School, Canterbury
- Borden Grammar School, Sittingbourne
- Chatham and Clarendon Grammar School, Ramsgate
- Cranbrook School, Cranbrook
- Dane Court Grammar School, Broadstairs
- Dartford Grammar School, Dartford
- Dartford Grammar School for Girls, Dartford
- Dover Grammar School for Boys, Dover
- Dover Grammar School for Girls, Dover
- The Folkestone School for Girls, Folkestone
- Gravesend Grammar School, Gravesend
- The Harvey Grammar School, Folkestone
- Highsted Grammar School, Sittingbourne
- Highworth Grammar School for Girls, Ashford
- Invicta Grammar School, Maidstone
- The Judd School, Tonbridge
- Maidstone Grammar School, Maidstone
- Maidstone Grammar School for Girls, Maidstone
- Mayfield Grammar School, Gravesend
- The Norton Knatchbull School, Ashford
- Oakwood Park Grammar School, Maidstone
- Queen Elizabeth's Grammar School, Faversham
- Simon Langton Girls' Grammar School, Canterbury
- Simon Langton Grammar School for Boys, Canterbury
- Sir Roger Manwood's School, Sandwich
- The Skinners' School, Tunbridge Wells
- Tonbridge Grammar School, Tonbridge
- Tunbridge Wells Girls' Grammar School, Tunbridge Wells
- Tunbridge Wells Grammar School for Boys, Tunbridge Wells
- Weald of Kent Grammar School, Tonbridge
- Wilmington Grammar School for Boys, Wilmington
- Wilmington Grammar School for Girls, Wilmington

=== Special and alternative schools ===
- Aspire School, Sittingbourne
- The Beacon, Folkestone
- Birchwood, Folkestone
- Bower Grove School, Maidstone
- Broomhill Bank School, Rusthall
- Elms School, Dover
- Enterprise Learning Alliance, Margate
- Five Acre Wood School, Maidstone
- Foreland Fields School, Ramsgate
- Goldwyn School, Great Chart
- Grange Park School, Wrotham
- Ifield School, Gravesend
- Laleham Gap School, Ramsgate
- Maidstone and Malling Alternative Provision, Maidstone
- Meadowfield School, Sittingbourne
- Milestone Academy, New Ash Green
- Nexus Foundation Special School, Tonbridge
- North West Kent Alternative Provision Service, Gravesend
- Oakley School, Royal Tunbridge Wells
- The Orchard School, Canterbury
- Portal House School, St Margaret's at Cliffe
- The Rosewood School, Leybourne
- Rowhill School, Longfield
- St Anthony's School, Margate
- St Nicholas' School, Canterbury
- Snowfields Academy, Weavering
- Stone Bay School, Broadstairs
- Two Bridges School, Southborough
- Valence School, Westerham
- The Wyvern School, Ashford

=== Further education ===
- Canterbury College
- Dorton College of Further Education
- East Kent College
- Hadlow College
- K College
- University for the Creative Arts
- Kent Institute of Art & Design
- MidKent College
- North West Kent College
- South Kent College

== Independent schools ==
=== Primary and preparatory schools ===
- Bronte School, Gravesend
- Chartfield School, Westgate-on-Sea
- Derwent Lodge, Tonbridge
- Dulwich Prep Cranbrook, Coursehorn
- Elliott Park School, Minster
- Fosse Bank School, Hildenborough
- The Granville School, Sevenoaks
- Haddon Dene School, Broadstairs
- Hilden Grange School, Tonbridge
- Hilden Oaks Preparatory School, Tonbridge
- Holmewood House School, Langton Green
- Junior King's School, Sturry
- Kent College Infant and Junior School, Canterbury
- Lorenden Preparatory School, Faversham
- Marlborough House School, Hawkhurst
- The Mead School, Royal Tunbridge Wells
- New Beacon School, Sevenoaks
- Northbourne Park School, Betteshanger
- Rose Hill School, Culverden Down
- Russell House School, Otford
- St Faith's at Ash School, Ash
- St Helens Montessori School, East Farleigh
- St Michael's Preparatory School, Otford
- St Ronan's School, Hawkhurst
- Sevenoaks Preparatory School, Sevenoaks
- Solefield School, Sevenoaks
- Somerhill Pre-Prep, Tonbridge
- Spring Grove School, Wye
- Steephill School, Fawkham
- Wellesley House School, Broadstairs
- Yardley Court, Tonbridge

=== Senior and all-through schools ===
- Ashford School, Ashford
- Beech Grove School, Nonington
- Beechwood School, Tunbridge Wells
- Benenden School, Benenden
- Bethany School, Goudhurst
- CATS College Canterbury, Canterbury
- Cobham Hall School, Cobham
- Dover College, Dover
- Earlscliffe, Folkestone
- Gad's Hill School, Higham
- Kent College, Canterbury
- Kent College, Pembury
- The King's School, Canterbury
- MEPA Academy, Maidstone
- New School Canterbury, Petham
- OneSchool Global UK, Linton
- Radnor House Sevenoaks School, Sundridge
- Sackville School, Hildenborough
- St Edmund's School, Canterbury
- St Lawrence College, Ramsgate
- Sevenoaks School, Sevenoaks
- Sutton Valence School, Maidstone
- Tonbridge School, Tonbridge
- Walthamstow Hall, Sevenoaks

=== Special and alternative schools ===
- Alchemy School, Teynham
- ALP Sittingbourne, Sittingbourne
- The Annex School House, Hextable
- Belle Vue School, Cranbrook
- Birtley House Independent School, West Kingsdown
- Brewood Secondary School, Deal
- Caldecott Foundation School, Smeeth
- Cherry Tree, Margate
- Compass Community School Coastal Park, Folkestone
- Cornfields School, Ashford
- Cross Keys Learning, Broadstairs
- The Davenport School, Eastry
- Fairlight Glen Independent Special School, Herne Bay
- Great Oaks Small School, Minster
- Greenfields School, Biddenden
- Haven Nook, Canterbury
- Heath Farm School, Charing
- Helen Allison School, Meopham
- Hope View School, Chilham
- Infiniti School, Doddington
- ISP Polar Re Start Centre, Whitstable
- ISP School, Teynham
- King's Reach Education, Maidstone
- Learning Opportunities Centre, Ringwould
- Life Skills Manor for Autism, Sandwich
- Little Acorns School, St Michaels
- The Llewellyn School and Nursery, Birchington-on-Sea
- Maple Tree Primary School, Ramsgate
- Meadows School, Southborough
- Medway Green School, Wouldham
- Newingate School, Canterbury
- The Old Priory School, Ramsgate
- Parkview Academy, Margate
- Pier View Academy, Gravesend
- The Quest School, Paddock Wood
- Ripplevale School, Ripple
- The Sallygate School, Temple Ewell
- Small Haven School, Ramsgate
- The T3 School, Ashford
- The View School, Edenbridge
- VTC Independent School, Sittingbourne
- West Heath School, Sevenoaks

=== Further education ===
- Hilderstone College, Broadstairs
- MEPA College, Maidstone
- School of English Studies, Folkestone
