= The Charles Dickens School =

Location
- Broadstairs Road; Broadstairs, Kent, CT10 2RL; England
- Coordinates: 51.3608°N 1.4220°E

Information
- Type: Academy
- Local authority: Kent County Council
- Trust: Barton Court Academy Trust
- Department for Education URN: 144015 Tables
- Ofsted: Reports
- Headteacher: Warren Smith
- Gender: Co-educational
- Age: 11 to 16
- Enrolment: 1104 as of September 2020
- Capacity: 1104
- Website: http://www.cds.kent.sch.uk/

The Charles Dickens School is a co-educational secondary modern school located in Broadstairs in the English county of Kent. The school is named after Charles Dickens, the 19th-century writer and social critic. It is one of six non-selective schools on the Isle of Thanet, physically isolated corner of Kent.

The Charles Dickens School is part of the Barton Court Academy Trust (BCAT).

== History ==
The Charles Dickens School was the highest achieving non-selective school in East Kent in 2023. This followed a period of rapid improvement following an Ofsted report of 2011 which found The Charles Dickens School generally overall Grade 2 'Good', in 2014 it was judged Grade 4 'inadequate' and placed in 'Special measures' with ongoing monitoring inspections. The school received external support by leaders from St George's Church of England Foundation School. This ceased at the end of July 2016. The executive headteacher and her colleagues from St George's were credited with have driven rapid improvement at The Charles Dickens School, but against expectations, the GCSE result were again poor. The headteacher resigned. However the school remained popular with parents and oversubscribed. In March 2017 it became an academy and was transferred to the Barton Court Academy Trust

=== Other Thanet Schools ===
- King Ethelbert School
- St George's Church of England Foundation School
- Ursuline College, Westgate-on-Sea
- The Charles Dickens School
- Hartsdown Academy
- The Royal Harbour Academy
- Park Crescent Academy (opening soon)

== Description ==
The Charles Dickens School is a 1200 pupil 11-16 academy in Kent. Kent retains a selective system where pupils sit an eleven-plus test. Pupils who pass the test go to the Grammar school and Charles Dickens takes pupils who have not or who choose a more broad education with the option of vocational study in the Performing Arts, Arts, Engineering and Food Technology as an option. The school is in Broadstairs, on the Thanet peninsula 30 km from other centres of population. Thanet is surrounded on three sides by water.

It offers GCSEs and BTECs as programmes of study for pupils. The current metric is success in the Progress 8 benchmark subjects.

== Academics ==
Virtually all maintained schools and academies follow the National Curriculum, and are inspected by Ofsted on how well they succeed in delivering a 'broad and balanced curriculum'.

=== Key Stage 3 ===
The school has decided that Key Stage 3 contains years 7, 8 .

There are 3 learning pathways, that offer appropriate level courses for all students:

1. The English Baccalaureate (EBacc), “Grammar Stream” pathway. These are the only students to be offered a language- and thus the only students that will be eligible for Progress 8.
2. The “Main” pathway
3. The “Secondary Ready” pathway that does additional work on supporting numeracy and literacy

"It is important that every student follows the most appropriate learning pathway that meets their needs and reflects their prior attainment and progress to date. The learning pathway should provide sufficient pace and challenge to learning and reflect the student's individual interest, talents and academic ability. All pathways provide each student with a broad and balanced curriculum at an appropriate pace and pitch of learning to ensure all students make expected or more than expected progress at KS3."

=== Key Stage 4 ===
The three level approach is continued, the pathways are now called the EBacc, the main and the technical. Every student follows the most appropriate learning pathway that meets their needs in KS5 and in the future and reflects their prior attainment and progress to date. The learning pathway should provide sufficient pace and challenge to learning and reflect the student's individual interest, talents and academic ability, naturally the final programme of study chosen needs to be broad, balanced, relevant and enjoyable. It also meets the statutory requirements and adds to the school performance measures.

To achieve an EBacc, students must gain a GCSE grade 9-5 in six subjects, a modern foreign language- in this case Spanish, the core subjects of Maths, English Language, two science, one of which may be computing and then history or geography which are referred to as a humanity. The EBacc pathway also studies English Literature, and two other academic or vocational subjects. The main pathway studies a core of mathematics, English Language and Literature, combined Science (two GCSEs), and one subject from Geography or History. They study 3 additional options. The technical pathway study a core of mathematics, English Language and Literature, combined Science (two GCSEs) with 3 options, and additional mathematics and English.

== See also ==
- Barton Court Grammar School
