= The Whitstable School =

Location
- Bellevue Road; Whitstable, Kent, CT5 1PX; England; 51.351257°N 1.038536°E

Information
- Type: Academy
- Motto: "On Track To Excellence"
- Founder: Sir. William Nottidge
- Local authority: Kent County Council
- Trust: Swale Academies Trust
- Department for Education URN: 144354 Tables
- Ofsted: Reports
- Head teacher: Alex Holmes
- Gender: Coeducational
- Age: 11 to 18
- Enrolment: 1138 as of April 2024
- Website: https://thewhitstableschool.org.uk/

The Whitstable School is a coeducational secondary school and sixth form located in Whitstable, Kent, England.

It was established in 1952 as the Sir William Nottidge School and was known by this name until 1998 when it was changed to The Community College Whitstable. In 2018 it was renamed as The Whitstable School (to hide the stigma associated with the previous name) after converting to academy status. The school is administered by The Swale Academies Trust.

== History ==
In 1998, the name Sir William Nottidge was dropped and the school was relaunched as the Community College Whitstable along with the introduction of a new badge and re-introduction of the house system. The school joined Swale Academies Trust in 2018 which also includes Westlands School, Westlands Primary School, Regis Manor Primary School, Meopham School and The Sittingbourne School.

== School structure ==
The house system was established in 1952, when there were four houses: Coppens, Minters, Torrith and Sedberry, each of which had selected house prefects. The house colours were: red for Coppens, yellow for Minters, blue for Torrith and green for Sedberry.

From 2005-2011 the school operated four houses that related to murals painted in its older RE building corridor. The houses were colour coded as Red, Green, Yellow & Blue. The houses were named after local landmarks: Castle (Red), Windmill (Yellow), Harbour (Blue) & Street (Green).

The school is now divided into two houses and is based around two famous ships, Victory and Endeavour. The famous warship HMS Victory is best known as Lord Nelson’s flagship at the Battle of Trafalgar in 1805. HMS Endeavour was the British Royal Navy research vessel that Lieutenant James Cook commanded on his first voyage of discovery, to Australia and New Zealand, from 1769 to 1771.
