= Tim Stanley =

British journalist and historian (born 1982)

- Born: Timothy Randolph Stanley; 13 July 1982 (age 44); Sevenoaks, Kent, England
- Education: The Judd School
- Alma mater: Trinity College, Cambridge (BA, MPhil, PhD)
- Occupations: Journalist; historian; broadcaster
- Years active: 2006–present
- Website: www.timothystanley.co.uk

Timothy Randolph Stanley (born 13 July 1982) is a British journalist and historian.

== Early life and education ==
Educated at The Judd School, a grammar school in Tonbridge, Kent, Stanley taught as a gap student at Solefield School, Sevenoaks, before reading modern history at Trinity College, Cambridge, where he graduated as Bachelor of Arts (BA).

Stanley then pursued postgraduate studies at the Faculty of History, University of Cambridge, completing a Master of Philosophy (MPhil) degree, then taking a doctorate of Philosophy (PhD).

Stanley was raised as a Baptist. In 2002 he began to consider himself to be an Anglican, and was baptised as an Anglican at Little St. Mary's, Cambridge, in New Year 2003. He subsequently aligned himself with the Church of England's Anglo-Catholic wing, before being received into the Catholic Church, aged 23.

Stanley was active in student journalism at Cambridge and contributing to student newspaper Varsity.

== Academic career ==
Stanley held lectureships at the University of Sussex (2008–09) and Royal Holloway College, London (2009–11) and, from 2011 to 2012, he became an associate member of the Rothermere American Institute at the University of Oxford, receiving a Leverhulme Trust Grant.

In November 2011, Stanley organised a conference called History: What is it good for?, which generated some controversy after one of the speakers, David Starkey, said that the national curriculum in British schools overlooks British culture.

== Media ==
Stanley is a columnist with The Daily Telegraph and also co-hosts its podcast The Daily T with Camilla Tominey. He has also been a regular contributor to CNN, reporting on American politics and culture, including the 2016 and subsequent election campaigns. He contributes to History Today and Literary Review, and has written pieces for The Guardian and The Spectator.

Stanley wrote and presented a documentary for the BBC entitled Family Guys? What Sitcoms Say About America Now, which was broadcast in October 2012. He is also an occasional pundit on BBC News, CNBC, Sky News and Channel 4 News.

He has presented BBC Radio 4's Thought for the Day, is a contributor on The Moral Maze and has appeared several times on the panel of the BBC's Question Time and Politics Live.

== Politics ==
Joining the Labour Party at the age of 15, Stanley was chairman of Cambridge University Labour Club for 2003/04, and stood as the Labour candidate for his home constituency of Sevenoaks at the 2005 general election, coming third. He has since distanced himself from Labour, and has argued in support of the Republican Party in the United States. At the 2017 general election, Stanley allied himself with the Conservative Party, voting for them again in 2019. Stanley announced his voting preference in favour of the Social Democratic Party (SDP) at the 2024 general election, preferring its emphasis on national solidarity to that of Reform, whose focus was on British exceptionalism.

Stanley supported the UK leaving the European Union.

== Personal life ==
Stanley lives in Kent.

== Publications ==
- Timothy Stanley and Alexander Lee, The End of Politics: Realignment and the Battle for the Centre Ground (London: Politico's, London, 2006) ISBN 9781842751749
- Timothy Stanley, Kennedy vs. Carter: The 1980 Battle for the Democratic Party's Soul (Lawrence: University Press of Kansas, 2010) ISBN 9780700617029
- Timothy Stanley, The Crusader: The Life and Tumultuous Times of Pat Buchanan (New York: Thomas Dunne, 2012) ISBN 9780312581749
- Jonathan Bell and Timothy Stanley (eds.), Making Sense of American Liberalism (Champaign: University of Illinois Press, 2012) ISBN 9780252036866
- Timothy Stanley, Citizen Hollywood: How the Collaboration between LA and DC Revolutionized American Politics (New York: Thomas Dunne Books, 2014) ISBN 9781250032492
- Tim Stanley, Whatever Happened to Tradition?: History, Belonging and the Future of the West (Bloomsbury Continuum, 2021) ISBN 9781472974129
