= Chaucer School, Canterbury =

Chaucer School
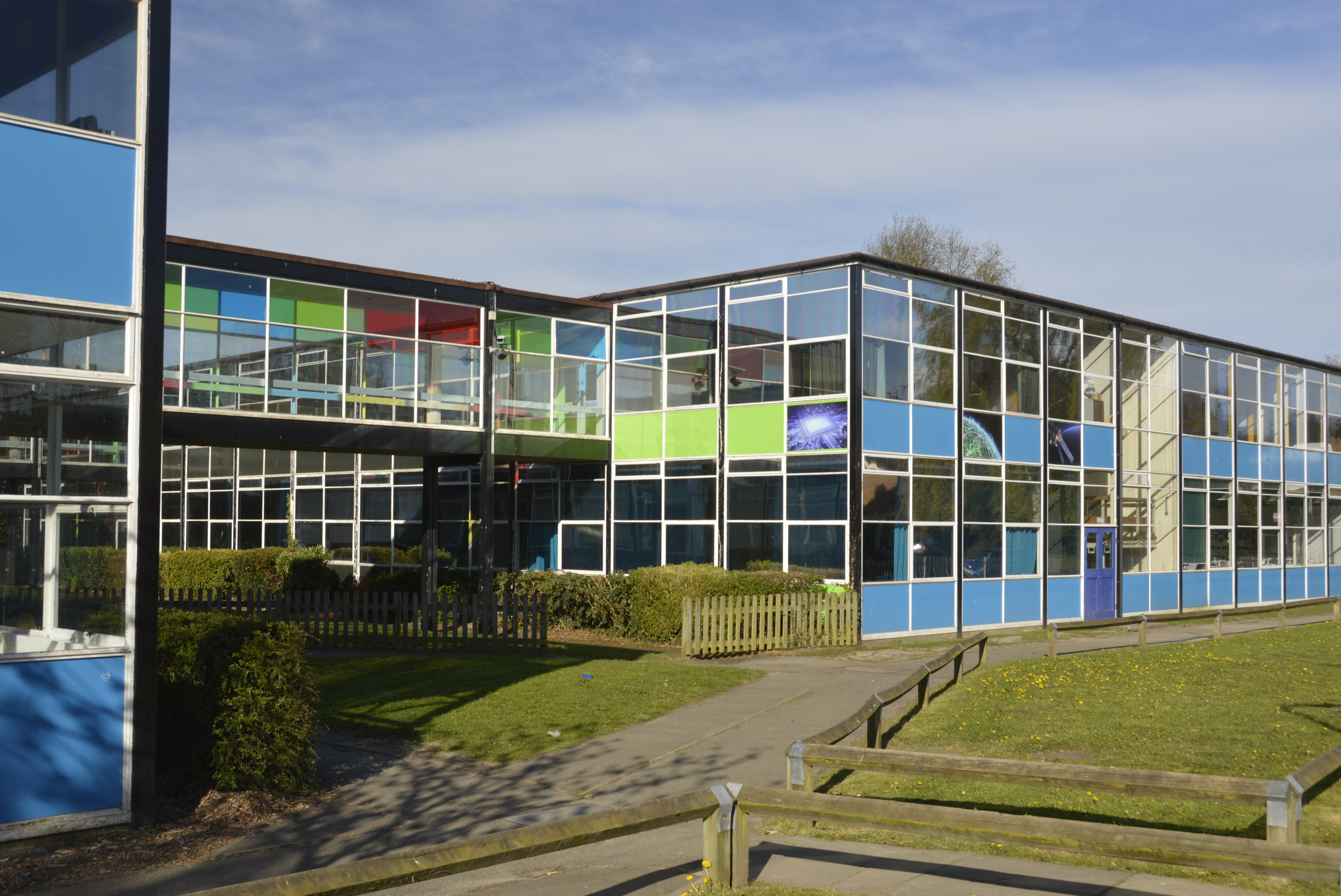
- Chaucer School in May 2013

Location
- Spring Lane; Canterbury, Kent, CT1 1SU; England
- Coordinates: 51°16′26″N 1°06′00″E

Information
- Type: Foundation school
- Closed: 2015
- Local authority: Kent
- Department for Education URN: 118924 Tables
- Ofsted: Reports
- Gender: Mixed
- Age: 11 to 18
- Houses: 5 Colleges of Learning (Assisi, Athena, Curie, Da Vinci, Marlowe) (Defunct as of the 2013–2014 academic year.)
- Colours: Navy and Gold
- Website: www.chaucer.ac.uk (inactive)

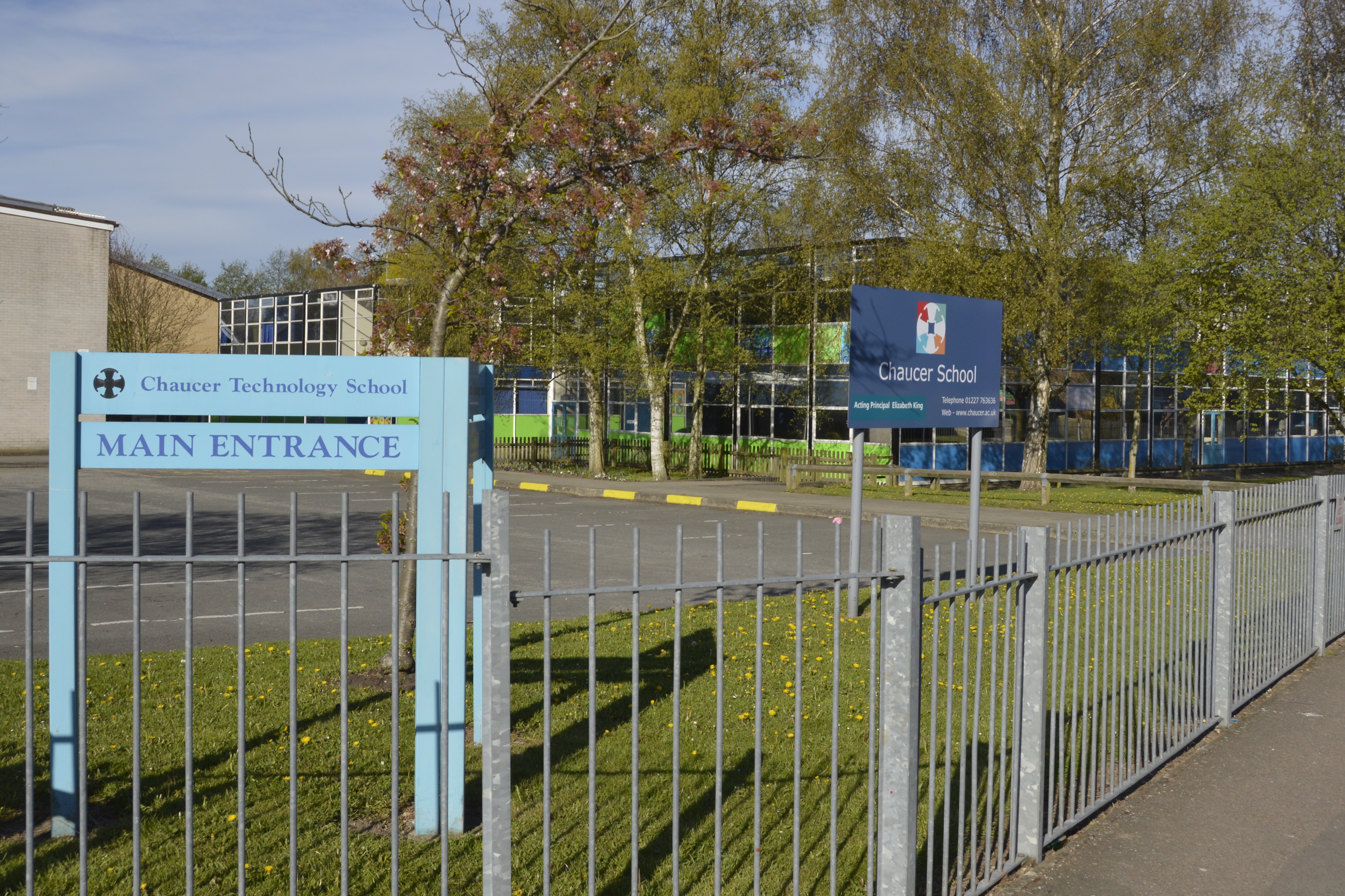
School entrance in May 2013 showing old Technology School branding and the new branding

Chaucer School (or known simply as Chaucer) was a partially selective, mixed ability comprehensive school in Canterbury, Kent.

Former names of Chaucer include Chaucer Technology School, Geoffrey Chaucer and Canterbury Technical High School for Boys

In February 2014 Kent County Council announced that the school would shut because of low pupil intake and poor standards. Just weeks before Swale Academies Trust had promised a conversion to academy status and the sale of land to rebuild the school, but these plans were scrapped. Shortly after the proposal for closure was made public a petition on Change.org was created in an attempt to revert Kent County Council's decision, but this failed. The school closed in September 2015.

== History ==
The school was founded before the Second World War as the Canterbury Technical High School for Boys. It shared the old hospital building on Longport Street with a girls' equivalent (which became Barton Court Grammar School) and the Technical College (now Canterbury College). In September 1967 the boys' school moved to the current site on Spring Lane.

In 1973 the school was renamed the Geoffrey Chaucer School and took its first female students.

In 1990 the school became one of the first to be translated into a technology school with the encouragement the Conservative government, it was launched under the headship of Noreen Manning, previously head of Camden School for Girls in London who subsequently retired from the Chaucer through ill health.

Around the same time as the implementation of a college system in 2008, the school uniform was updated following a school-wide consultation, the senior management of the school was restructured and a rebranding of the school's image was completed. The school was then often referred to as "Chaucer Tech".

In Spring 2009 Chaucer was used in a BBC Inside Out South East television news feature to highlight the issue of asbestos in local school buildings. it was detected in two small cupboards that were used to store asbestos before it was linked with lung disorders. The school was used as the case study example of one of the 90 per cent of local schools that had asbestos. The school was found to have asbestos (like 554 out of 599 schools in Kent) but was shown to have dealt with the problem.

Pupils from the school were chosen to be members of a "guard of honour" for athletes at the opening ceremony of the 2012 Olympic Games, displaying artistic creations that the school had made to celebrate the event.

Up to the early years of the second decade of the 21st century the school was well regarded and received satisfactory reports following inspections, but later the school was reported to be unsatisfactory and was closed by the Council in 2015.

== Campus ==
Chaucer had a 12-classroom teaching block. These previously housed a large majority of English and maths lessons, but later changed to cover humanities subjects such as geography and history as a result of the College System. The block was often referred to as the "Humanities Block", "H Block" or "W Block", the W being a reference to Graham Wade, the school's fifth head teacher, who died of cancer.

The school completed a new Sixth Form Building in October 2008. Named the Fuller Block, after a former Chair of the Governing Body who died, it housed a common room, an assembly room, staff offices and multiple teaching rooms primarily for use by the Post 16 (or Sixth Form) of the school.

== Organisation and administration ==
In 2008 Chaucer introduced a new "Colleges of Learning" system in which every student, aside from "Post 16/Sixth Form" students, was assigned to a specific subject group. The five colleges were named Da Vinci, Curie, Marlowe, Assisi and Athena, and were made up of different subject areas. For example, Da Vinci College included mathematics and design technology. Subject groups changed classrooms to reflect this shift and so generally the colleges were geographically situated around the school site. The college system ceased to be used from the beginning of the 2013/14 academic year.

Chaucer Technology School was one of the many schools in Kent that used SIMS (School Information Management System), a Management Information System (MIS) developed by Capita's Education Services. The school also agreed with Capita to provide a case study, in which the former head teacher Simon Murphy said: "It is fundamental for students to understand where they are and what strategies they need to reach their potential and for parents to also understand, so they can support their children. Using the tools within SIMS we are able to support this."

=== Examinations ===
League tables published by the BBC based on 2008 A-levels ranked Chaucer as the 56th best school in Kent. According to the BBC, in 2008 A-Level students achieved an average of 620.4 QCDA points, against a national average of 739.8 and 31% of students achieved five or more grade C results (or equivalent) at GCSE, including Maths and English.
