= William Leet =

Recipient of the Victoria Cross

Major-General William Leet VC CB
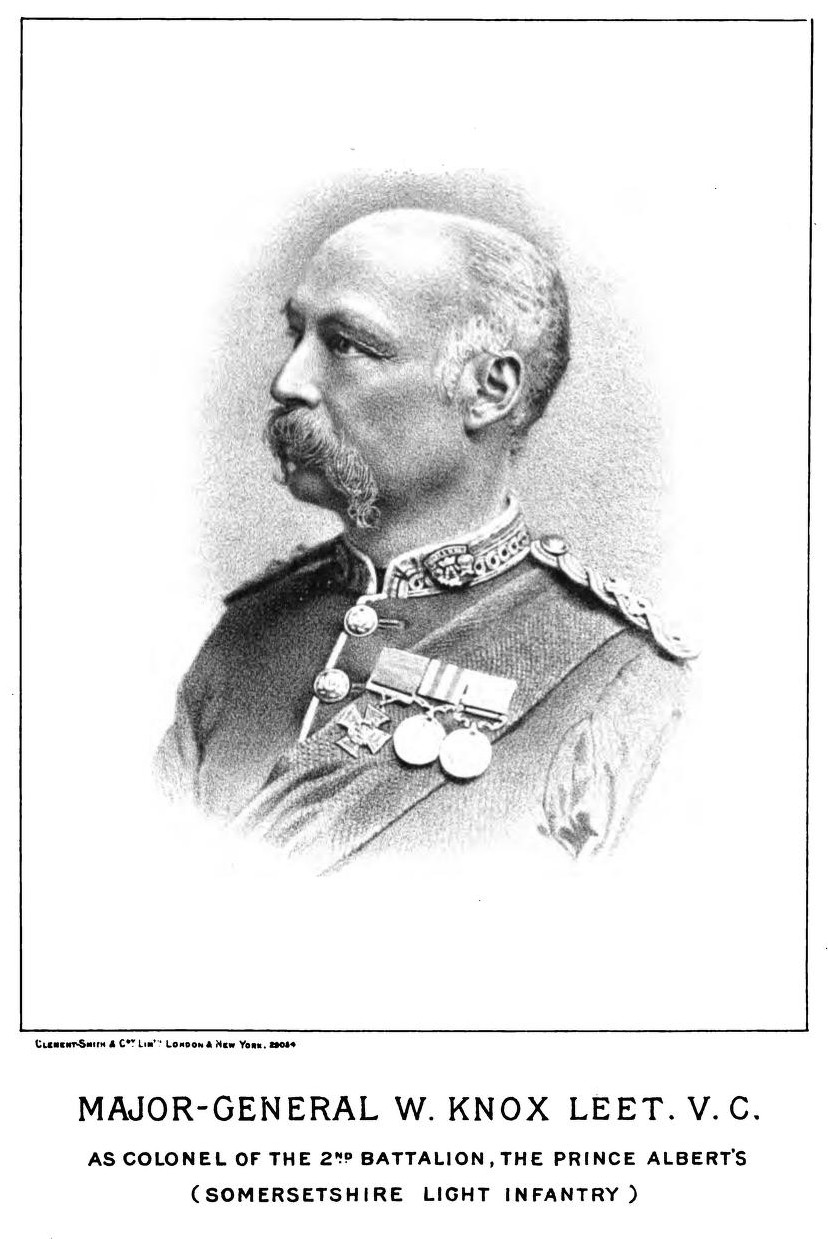
- Born: 3 November 1833; Dalkey, County Dublin
- Died: 29 June 1898 (aged 64); Great Chart, Kent
- Burial place: St Mary the Virgin Churchyard, Great Chart
- Military career
- Allegiance: United Kingdom
- Branch: British Army
- Rank: Major-General
- Units: 13th Regiment of Foot
- Conflicts: Indian Mutiny; Anglo-Zulu War; Third Anglo-Burmese War
- Awards: Victoria Cross; Order of the Bath

Major-General William Knox-Leet VC CB (3 November 1833 in Dalkey, County Dublin – 29 June 1898) was an Irish-born officer in the British Army and a recipient of the Victoria Cross, the highest and most prestigious award for gallantry in the face of the enemy that can be awarded to British and Commonwealth forces.

== Victoria Cross ==
Leet was 45 years old, and a Major in the 1st Bn., 13th Regiment of Foot (later The Somerset Light Infantry (Prince Albert's)), British Army during the Anglo-Zulu War when the following deed took place on 28 March 1879 at Battle of Hlobane, Zululand, South Africa for which he was awarded the Victoria Cross:

For his gallant conduct, on the 28th March, 1879, in rescuing from the Zulus Lieutenant A. M. Smith, of the Frontier Light Horse, during the retreat from the Inhlobana. Lieutenant Smith whilst on foot, his horse having been shot, was closely pursued by the Zulus, and would have been killed had not Major Leet taken him upon his horse and rode with him, under the fire of the enemy, to a place of safety.

== Later life ==
During the Third Anglo-Burmese War (1885–87), then-Colonel Knox-Leet commanded the Infantry's 2nd Battalion, of which 144 men lost their lives in battle. Their names are listed on the Burma Memorial in Taunton, Somersetshire. This was the 2nd Battalion's first operation. Knox-Leet was eventually promoted to Major General.

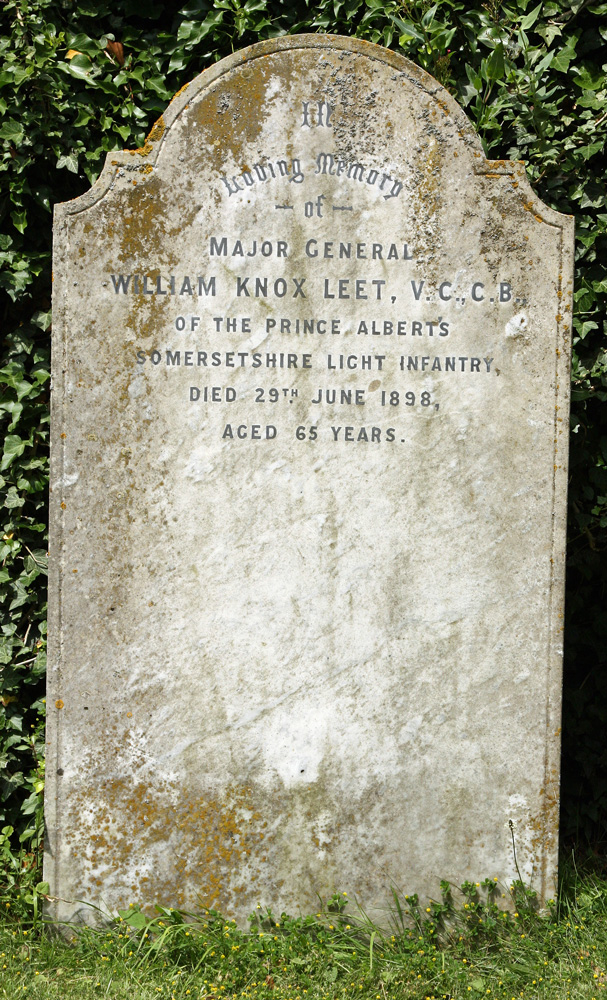

He married Charlotte Elizabeth Anne Sherlock, a daughter of Thomas Henry Sherlock and Mary Catherine Kingston of Bandon, County Cork, Ireland. They had two sons, Bertie Fielding Knox Leet and Dudley Knox Leet. William retired in July 1887, died in Great Chart, Kent, on 29 June 1898. A memorial to him is in Great Chart Churchyard.

His Victoria Cross is displayed at the Somerset Light Infantry Museum, located in Taunton, Somerset, England.
