= Lily Madigan =

British activist

- Born: 16 January 1998 (age 28)
- Political party: Labour

Lily Madigan (born 16 January 1998) is an activist within the British Labour Party. She was the first openly trans woman to hold the position of Constituency Labour Party Women's Officer, having been elected in November 2017 by the Labour Party in the constituency Rochester and Strood. Madigan's election as a Women's Officer was controversial within the Labour Party. A complaint by Madigan alleging transphobia against women's officer Anne Ruzylo was not upheld, but led Ruzylo to stand down. In 2019, Madigan was elected the national women's officer for Labour Students.

In 2016, Madigan took legal action while at St Simon Stock Catholic School, after the school made her wear a male uniform, continued to use her deadname and denied her access to female toilets.

Following Madigan's election as Women's Officer and around the time of Madigan's application to the Jo Cox Women in Leadership Programme, five critical articles were written about Madigan in The Times. Madigan was rejected from the programme, but the articles in The Times were condemned by 55 activists involved in the programme who applauded the party for "supporting the principle that every woman" should get the chance to participate. Signatories included Labour MPs Rosie Duffield and Preet Gill. These incidents led to Madigan receiving online abuse.

Madigan attended the University for the Creative Arts, at which she ran the LGBTQ+ liberation group, as well as the women's liberation group, and was Campus Executive Officer. The students' union put out a solidarity statement with Madigan, commenting on the attention she received in the media. In 2018, Madigan was listed as one of Teen Vogue's "21 Under 21".
