= Listed buildings in Great Chart with Singleton =

Historic structures in Kent, England

Great Chart with Singleton is a village and civil parish in the Borough of Ashford of Kent, England. It contains two grade I, five grade II* and 74 grade II listed buildings that are recorded in the National Heritage List for England.

This list is based on the information retrieved online from Historic England.

== Key ==
Grade	Criteria
I	Buildings that are of exceptional interest
II*	Particularly important buildings of more than special interest
II	Buildings that are of special interest

== Listing ==
Name	Grade	Location	Type	Completed (Note: The date given is the date used by Historic England as significant for the initial building or that of an important part in the structure's description.)	Date designated	Grid ref. (Note: The grid reference is based on the British national grid reference system, sometimes known as OSGB36, used by the Ordnance Survey.) Geo-coordinates	Notes	Entry number (Note: The "List Entry Number" is a unique number assigned to each listed building and scheduled monument by Historic England.)	Image	Wikidata
Great Chart War Memorial	II				17 April 2014	TQ9804541918; 51°08′32″N 0°49′47″E		1419188	Great Chart War Memorial More images	Q26676709
Bevenden Farmhouse	II	Ashford Road			10 October 1980	TQ9586839684; 51°07′23″N 0°47′51″E		1320009	Upload Photo	Q26606055
Bucksford Manor	II	Ashford Road			10 October 1980	TQ9885242493; 51°08′50″N 0°50′30″E		1362646	Upload Photo	Q26644521
Coach House and the Barn	II	Ashford Road, Great Chart, TN26 1JL			10 October 1980	TQ9610139643; 51°07′21″N 0°48′03″E		1071504	Upload Photo	Q26326695
Leacon Cottages	II	3, Ashford Road			10 October 1980	TQ9917542651; 51°08′54″N 0°50′47″E		1116300	Upload Photo	Q26409928
Little Moat Farmhouse	II	Ashford Road			10 October 1980	TQ9753341381; 51°08′15″N 0°49′20″E		1071502	Upload Photo	Q26326691
Lodge Place	II	Ashford Road			10 October 1980	TQ9614539655; 51°07′21″N 0°48′05″E		1116283	Upload Photo	Q26409915
Lodge Place Cottage	II	Ashford Road			10 October 1980	TQ9608139612; 51°07′20″N 0°48′02″E		1362648	Upload Photo	Q26644523
Moat Farmhouse	II	Ashford Road			10 October 1980	TQ9744341404; 51°08′16″N 0°49′15″E		1320015	Upload Photo	Q26606060
Oasthouse to North West of Lodge Place	II	Ashford Road			10 October 1980	TQ9611739672; 51°07′22″N 0°48′04″E		1116290	Upload Photo	Q26409919
Pear Tree Farmhouse	II	Ashford Road			14 February 1967	TQ9597939439; 51°07′15″N 0°47′56″E		1071505	Upload Photo	Q26326697
Pig and Whistle Farmhouse	II	Ashford Road, Great Chart, TN23 3DH			10 October 1980	TQ9732041024; 51°08′04″N 0°49′08″E		1320016	Upload Photo	Q26606061
Possingham Farmhouse	II	Ashford Road			14 February 1967	TQ9653039621; 51°07′20″N 0°48′25″E		1071503	Upload Photo	Q26326692
Oasthouse to South of Worten House	II	Bear Lane, Worten			10 October 1980	TQ9694843382; 51°09′21″N 0°48′54″E		1071506	Upload Photo	Q26326698
Weatherboarded Barn to South West of Worten House	II	Bear Lane, Worten			10 October 1980	TQ9690943379; 51°09′21″N 0°48′52″E		1116266	Upload Photo	Q26409902
Worten House	II	Bear Lane, Worten			10 October 1980	TQ9695743424; 51°09′22″N 0°48′54″E		1116264	Upload Photo	Q26409900
Worten Mill and Worten Millhouse	II	Bear Lane, Worten			14 February 1967	TQ9704743535; 51°09′26″N 0°48′59″E		1362649	Upload Photo	Q26644524
Buxford Mill Buxford Mill House	II	Bucksford Lane			14 February 1967	TQ9895042129; 51°08′38″N 0°50′34″E		1071507	Upload Photo	Q26326700
Singleton Manor	II*	Bucksford Lane			17 September 1952	TQ9888241647; 51°08′22″N 0°50′30″E		1116272	Upload Photo	Q17556283
Barn to South of Netters Farmhouse	II	Chilmington Green			10 October 1980	TQ9803540305; 51°07′40″N 0°49′44″E		1320049	Upload Photo	Q26606090
Bartlett Farmhouse	II	Chilmington Green			10 October 1980	TQ9786739824; 51°07′25″N 0°49′34″E		1071509	Upload Photo	Q26326703
Chilmington Cottage	II	Chilmington Green			10 October 1980	TQ9813540287; 51°07′39″N 0°49′49″E		1362614	Upload Photo	Q26644491
Chilmington Farmhouse	II	Chilmington Green			10 October 1980	TQ9825440452; 51°07′44″N 0°49′55″E		1116209	Upload Photo	Q26409852
Garage to South West of Little Chilmington	II	Chilmington Green			10 October 1980	TQ9764540088; 51°07′33″N 0°49′23″E		1116256	Upload Photo	Q26409892
Great Chilmington Farmhouse	II	Chilmington Green			14 February 1967	TQ9786940218; 51°07′37″N 0°49′35″E		1320026	Upload Photo	Q26606069
Little Chilmington	II	Chilmington Green			14 February 1967	TQ9766240102; 51°07′34″N 0°49′24″E		1071508	Upload Photo	Q26326702
Netters Farmhouse	II	Chilmington Green			14 February 1967	TQ9803640324; 51°07′41″N 0°49′44″E		1071510	Upload Photo	Q26326705
Stone Cottages	II	1-4, Chilmington Green			14 February 1967	TQ9805240157; 51°07′35″N 0°49′44″E		1116231	Upload Photo	Q26409871
Storehouse to North West of Little Chilmington	II	Chilmington Green			10 October 1980	TQ9763240121; 51°07′35″N 0°49′23″E		1362613	Upload Photo	Q26644490
Dairy Cottage Shepherd's Cottage Stable Cottage the Courtyard, Comprising Stable Cottage, Dairy Cottage, Garages and Shepherd's Cottage	II	Godinton Park			10 October 1980	TQ9815843872; 51°09′35″N 0°49′57″E		1116136	Upload Photo	Q26409789
Gazebo at Godinton	II	Godinton Park			10 October 1980	TQ9809443834; 51°09′34″N 0°49′54″E		1071512	Upload Photo	Q26326706
Godinton	I	Godinton Park			17 September 1952	TQ9820343860; 51°09′35″N 0°49′59″E		1071511	Godinton More images	Q5576653
Kitchen Garden Wall and Gatepiers to Godinton	II	Godinton Park			10 October 1980	TQ9801043853; 51°09′35″N 0°49′49″E		1362615	Upload Photo	Q26644492
Oasthouse at Godinton	II	Godinton Park			10 October 1980	TQ9804043861; 51°09′35″N 0°49′51″E		1116143	Oasthouse at Godinton More images	Q26409796
Goldwell	II	Goldwell Lane			14 February 1967	TQ9690142457; 51°08′51″N 0°48′50″E		1071476	Upload Photo	Q26326653
Granary About 150 Metres to South West of Purchase Farmhouse	II	Goldwell Lane			10 October 1980	TQ9709341435; 51°08′18″N 0°48′57″E		1071471	Upload Photo	Q26326647
Little Goldwell Farmhouse	II	Goldwell Lane			10 October 1980	TQ9675941924; 51°08′34″N 0°48′41″E		1071473	Upload Photo	Q26326650
Little Purchase Farmhouse	II	Goldwell Lane			10 October 1980	TQ9684441713; 51°08′27″N 0°48′45″E		1071472	Upload Photo	Q26326649
Little Singleton	II*	Goldwell Lane			14 February 1967	TQ9706141678; 51°08′26″N 0°48′56″E		1071474	Upload Photo	Q17556224
Little Singleton Oast	II	Goldwell Lane, Great Chart, TN26 1JS			10 October 1980	TQ9703041636; 51°08′24″N 0°48′55″E		1071475	Upload Photo	Q26326652
Oasthouse to West of Goldwell	II	Goldwell Lane			10 October 1980	TQ9685642455; 51°08′51″N 0°48′47″E		1071477	Upload Photo	Q26326655
Purchase Farmhouse	II	Goldwell Lane			10 October 1980	TQ9711641485; 51°08′19″N 0°48′59″E		1116144	Upload Photo	Q26409797
1 and 2, Gothic Cottages	II	1 and 2, Gothic Cottages, The Street, Great Chart, TN23 3AW			10 October 1980	TQ9818942095; 51°08′38″N 0°49′55″E		1320139	Upload Photo	Q26684563
3 and 4, Gothic Cottages	II	3 and 4, Gothic Cottages, The Street, Great Chart, TN23 3AW			10 October 1980	TQ9820142108; 51°08′38″N 0°49′56″E		1071487	Upload Photo	Q26326668
Minden	II	Great Chart, TN23 3DH			14 February 1967	TQ9726540908; 51°08′00″N 0°49′05″E		1116318	Upload Photo	Q26409945
The Singleton Barn	II	Hoxton Close, TN23 4TY			14 February 1967	TQ9882941653; 51°08′23″N 0°50′27″E		1362612	Upload Photo	Q26644489
1 and 2 Moat Farm Cottages	II	1 and 2, Moat Farm Cottages, Ashford Road, Great Chart, TN23 3DH			10 October 1980	TQ9735841139; 51°08′08″N 0°49′11″E		1362647	Upload Photo	Q26644522
Ninn Farmhouse	II	Ninn Lane			10 October 1980	TQ9788942728; 51°08′59″N 0°49′41″E		1362633	Ninn Farmhouse More images	Q26644509
The Chapel	II	Padwell Lane, Great Chart, TN23 3AU			10 October 1980	TQ9809141908; 51°08′32″N 0°49′50″E		1071483	Upload Photo	Q26326662
Coldharbour Farmhouse	II	Sandy Lane, Daniel's Water			10 October 1980	TQ9570941582; 51°08′24″N 0°47′47″E		1320086	Upload Photo	Q26606125
Tilmans	II	Sandy Lane, Daniel's Water			10 October 1980	TQ9580241303; 51°08′15″N 0°47′51″E		1071479	Upload Photo	Q26326656
Weatherboarded Barn About 10 Metres to East of Yardhurst	II	Sandy Lane, Daniel's Water			10 October 1980	TQ9557641172; 51°08′11″N 0°47′39″E		1362634	Upload Photo	Q26644510
Yardhurst	II*	Sandy Lane, Daniel's Water			17 September 1952	TQ9555841166; 51°08′11″N 0°47′38″E		1071478	Upload Photo	Q17556227
10 and 12, the Street	II	10 and 12, The Street			10 October 1980	TQ9829242211; 51°08′41″N 0°50′01″E		1320109	Upload Photo	Q26606147
16, the Street	II	16, The Street			10 October 1980	TQ9828542204; 51°08′41″N 0°50′00″E		1362638	Upload Photo	Q26644514
18, the Street	II	18, The Street			10 October 1980	TQ9827942195; 51°08′41″N 0°50′00″E		1320113	Upload Photo	Q26606150
44 and 46, the Street	II	44 and 46, The Street			10 October 1980	TQ9820142142; 51°08′39″N 0°49′56″E		1116057	Upload Photo	Q26409715
6 and 8, the Street	II	6 and 8, The Street			10 October 1980	TQ9829842218; 51°08′42″N 0°50′01″E		1071484	Upload Photo	Q26326664
64 and 66, the Street	II	64 and 66, The Street			14 February 1967	TQ9816642067; 51°08′37″N 0°49′54″E		1362640	Upload Photo	Q26644516
Baillie Hall	II	The Street, Great Chart, TN23 3AT			17 September 1952	TQ9808741933; 51°08′33″N 0°49′50″E		1071482	Upload Photo	Q26326661
Chart House	II	The Street			14 February 1967	TQ9821042065; 51°08′37″N 0°49′56″E		1071481	Upload Photo	Q26326659
Church of St Mary	I	The Street			14 February 1967	TQ9796441917; 51°08′32″N 0°49′43″E		1115757	Church of St Mary More images	Q17582902
Court Lodge	II*	The Street			17 September 1952	TQ9791441934; 51°08′33″N 0°49′41″E		1362641	Upload Photo	Q17556894
Forge Stores	II	The Street			10 October 1980	TQ9830742228; 51°08′42″N 0°50′01″E		1320106	Upload Photo	Q26606144
Ivy Cottages	II	1-6, The Street			10 October 1980	TQ9813141991; 51°08′34″N 0°49′52″E		1116129	Upload Photo	Q26409782
Kent Cottage	II	The Street, Great Chart, TN23 3AJ			10 October 1980	TQ9827142187; 51°08′41″N 0°50′00″E		1071485	Upload Photo	Q26326665
Mill House the Curosity Shop	II	58, 60 and 62, The Street			14 February 1967	TQ9817542076; 51°08′37″N 0°49′54″E		1320103	Upload Photo	Q26606142
Padwell Cottages	II	1 and 2, The Street			10 October 1980	TQ9812941893; 51°08′31″N 0°49′52″E		1116098	Upload Photo	Q26409755
The Almshouses	II	1, 2 and 3, The Street			10 October 1980	TQ9816142019; 51°08′35″N 0°49′54″E		1362636	The Almshouses More images	Q26644512
The Cottage	II	The Street			10 October 1980	TQ9827242148; 51°08′39″N 0°49′59″E		1116119	Upload Photo	Q26409773
The Holders	II	3, The Street			10 October 1980	TQ9833242204; 51°08′41″N 0°50′03″E		1320088	Upload Photo	Q26606127
The Old Granary	II	7-11, The Street			10 October 1980	TQ9830842193; 51°08′41″N 0°50′01″E		1071480	Upload Photo	Q26326658
The Old School	II	The Street, Great Chart, TN23 3AX			10 October 1980	TQ9804341901; 51°08′32″N 0°49′47″E		1320083	Upload Photo	Q26606122
The Rectory	II	The Street			14 February 1967	TQ9764641815; 51°08′29″N 0°49′27″E		1071489	Upload Photo	Q26326670
The Swan & Dog	II	The Street, Great Chart, TN23 3AN			10 October 1980	TQ9823342157; 51°08′40″N 0°49′58″E		1362639	The Swan & Dog More images	Q26644515
The White House	II	The Street			14 February 1967	TQ9800741881; 51°08′31″N 0°49′45″E		1362637	Upload Photo	Q26644513
Timber Framed Building in the South West Corner of the Churchyard of Church of St Mary	II*	The Street			14 February 1967	TQ9796041884; 51°08′31″N 0°49′43″E		1071488	Timber Framed Building in the South West Corner of the Churchyard of Church of St Mary More images	Q17556234
Toke Cottage	II	48 and 50, The Street			10 October 1980	TQ9819742127; 51°08′39″N 0°49′56″E		1071486	Upload Photo	Q26326666
Wall to Churchyard of Church of St Mary and to Court Lodge	II	The Street			10 October 1980	TQ9798941890; 51°08′31″N 0°49′44″E		1320291	Wall to Churchyard of Church of St Mary and to Court Lodge More images	Q26606305
Walnut Tree Cottage	II	The Street			10 October 1980	TQ9823442104; 51°08′38″N 0°49′57″E		1362635	Upload Photo	Q26644511
Walnut Tree House	II	The Street			14 February 1967	TQ9818842057; 51°08′36″N 0°49′55″E		1116126	Upload Photo	Q26409779

== See also ==
- Grade I listed buildings in Kent
- Grade II* listed buildings in Kent

== Sources ==
- Newman, John (2012) [1969], Kent: West and the Weald, The Buildings of England, New Haven and London: Yale University Press, ISBN 978-0-300-18509-6
