= Great Chart with Singleton =

Civil parish in Kent, England

Coordinates: 51.1409°N 0.8372°E

- Location within Kent
- Population: 4,206 (2001); 6,801 (2011)
- OS grid reference: TQ984418
- Civil parish: Great Chart with Singleton
- District: Ashford
- Shire county: Kent
- Region: South East
- Country: England
- Sovereign state: United Kingdom
- Post town: ASHFORD
- Postcode district: TN23
- Dialling code: 01233
- Police: Kent
- Fire: Kent
- Ambulance: South East Coast
- UK Parliament: Ashford
- Website: Parish Council

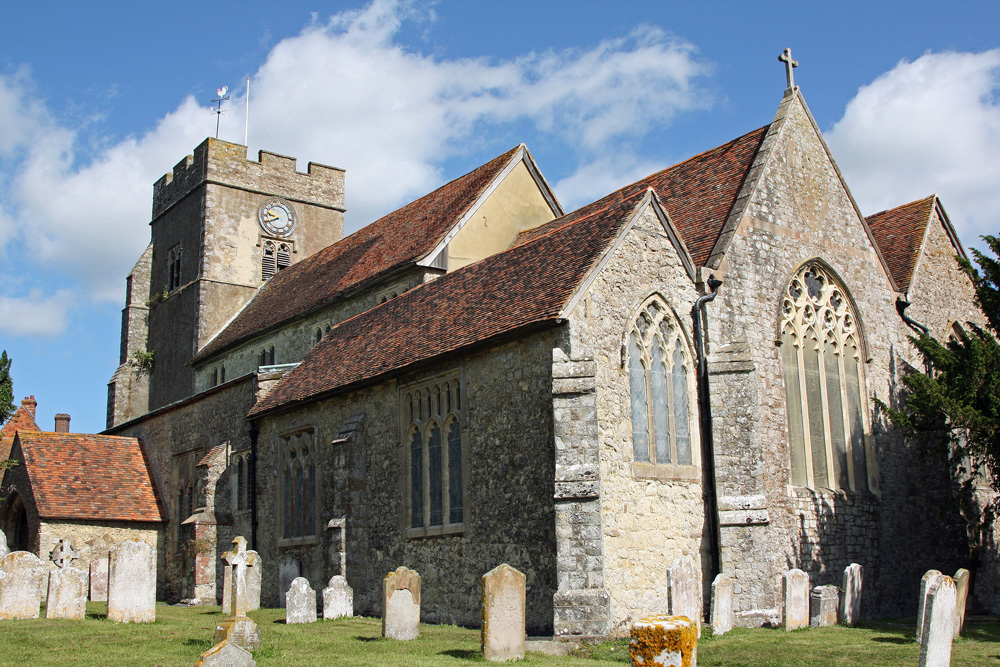
The Church of St Mary the Virgin. Great Chart, Kent. England.

Great Chart with Singleton is a civil parish in the Ashford district of Kent, England. The parish population is mostly concentrated in the ancient village of Great Chart and the modern Singleton housing development, both located in the eastern part of the parish, near the town of Ashford. Singleton accounts for about 80% population of the entire parish and is directly adjacent to Ashford. The village of Great Chart is located to the west of Singleton, about two miles (3.2 km) from the centre of Ashford. The remaining area of the parish is largely agricultural, with several farms. Chilmington Green is also included in the civil parish.

The medieval parish church is dedicated to St Mary; there is also Grace Fellowship (an independent evangelical church and member of the FIEC Fellowship of Independent Evangelical Churches) which meets 10:30am on Sunday mornings at the old Methodist church building formally known as St John's.

The historic Godinton House and Gardens are located in the north part of the parish.

The Parish also contains the Singleton Environment Centre, and the Ashford Community Woodland, both popular local attractions and important areas of conservational activity.

The parish was formed on 1 April 1987 from part of the parish of Great Chart and part of the unparished area of Ashford.

== Transport ==
The civil parish is bisected by numerous footpaths and roads, including a part of the Greensand Way and the A28 road connecting the parish with junction 9 of the M20 motorway in Ashford. A straight railway line - a part of South Eastern Main Line between Pluckley and Ashford - marks off the north quarter of the parish.

Two bus routes (A and 2) operated by Stagecoach in East Kent connect the parish with Ashford town centre and Ashford International railway station.

== See also ==
- Listed buildings in Great Chart with Singleton
