= St Simon Stock Catholic School =

St. Simon Stock Catholic School

Location
- Oakwood Park, Maidstone, Kent, ME16 0JP; England; 51°16′23″N 0°29′49″E

Information
- Type: Academy
- Motto: Labora Cum Amore "Work with love"
- Religious affiliation: Roman Catholic
- Established: 1967
- Department for Education URN: 140537 Tables
- Ofsted: Reports
- Head teacher: Andrea Denny
- Gender: Co-educational
- Age: 11 to 18
- Enrollment: 1500+
- Houses: Cardinal Hume; St Therese; St Romero; St Bernadette of Lourdes
- Website: http://www.ssscs.co.uk

St Simon Stock Catholic School is a mixed secondary school and sixth form with academy status, located in Maidstone, Kent, England. It was founded in 1967 and is the only Roman Catholic secondary school in the area. It was named after the Carmelite St. Simon Stock, who was believed to be born in Aylesford and is linked to the nearby Aylesford Priory and St Francis' Church, Maidstone.

== School ==
St Simon Stock is a mixed Roman Catholic comprehensive co-educational school with an academic and pastoral tradition. Its function is to serve the educational needs of Roman Catholic students in the Mid Kent area. The students of the school range from 11 to 18 years. Students are also admitted from other Christian denominations and other faiths only if there are left over places.

The school's official name with the DfES was officially changed in 2001, with "Catholic School" added to the end. The headteacher at the time, Mr McParland, stated that this was to emphasise the school's Catholic ethos.

== History ==
The school was opened in 1966 to serve the growth of the Catholic community within the Maidstone area, originally with the intention of the school serving as the centre for a new Catholic parish.

In the early 2000s, after the appointment of John McParland as headteacher, a drama studio was built in memory of Kath Topping, a former school governor, along with two new science classrooms.

The school was designated as a Specialist Technology College by the DfES in 2003, with the additional funding used to provide a new Sports Hall and Sixth Form building/teaching rooms, including a conference room. One other new block has been built, which contains three specialist ICT rooms, which are equipped with a full class set of 30 desktop computers, and interactive whiteboards. The block also includes two business studies classrooms.

On 30 November 2009, it was announced to the school that Mr McParland would be departing as headmaster, to take up the role of principal at a new academy to be formed from the old Christ Church C of E School in Ashford, Kent. At the end of the 2009/10 academic year, it was announced that Brendan Wall, a headteacher from a Catholic school in Wiltshire, would take up the post of headteacher from September 2010.

From September 2011, the school's specialist status was changed to a Science college, owing to the facilities afforded by the newly refurbished science classrooms after a significant upgrade.

On 1 January 2014 the school converted to academy status.

In late 2016 the school's reputation was brought into question after it emerged that Lily Madigan had brought legal action against the school for transphobic rules and conduct at the school. An agreement was reached to change the rules without further legal action. Headteacher Wall issued an apology, and training was introduced as part of the agreement.

== Notable former pupils ==
- Shaun Williamson (b. 1965) – EastEnders actor
- Mark Beeney (b. 1967) – footballer, Gillingham/Maidstone United/Brighton/Leeds Utd goalkeeper
- Damian Matthew (b. 1970) – Footballer, Chelsea F.C.
- Jon Harley (b. 1979) – footballer, Chelsea/Notts County
- Doug Loft (b. 1986) – footballer, Brighton/Port Vale
- Danielle Buet (b. 1988) – Footballer West Ham United F.C. Women
- Harry Arter (b. 1989) – footballer, Nottingham Forest F.C.
- Bunmi Mojekwu (b. 1989) actress, EastEnders
- Lily Madigan (b. 1998) – First Trans woman to hold the position of Women's Officer in the Labour Party constituency of Rochester and Strood
- Alessia Russo (b. 1999) – Footballer, Arsenal W.F.C.
- Nic Fanciulli – Grammy-nominated producer and International DJ
