= Wellesley Haddon Dene School =

Location
- Broadstairs, Kent, CT10 2DG; England; 51.3554°N 1.4273°E

Information
- Type: Private school Preparatory school Day and boarding school
- Motto: A scalis patulis tandem adveniemus ad astra
- Religious affiliation: Church of England
- Established: 1866
- Chairman: Ali Khan
- Head Master: Duncan Andrews
- Gender: Coeducational
- Age: 2 to 11
- Enrolment: 130
- Website: https://www.wellesleyhaddondene.co.uk/

Wellesley Haddon Dene School is a private day preparatory school in the coastal town of Broadstairs in the English county of Kent. The earliest of a succession of schools which merged was founded in 1866. It educates boys and girls aged 2 to 11. The merger of Haddon Dene School with Wellesley House School to form the newly named Wellesley Haddon Dene School in 2022, was associated with plans to expand. The school also includes a number of pupils with Special educational needs and disability (SEND).

== History ==
The history of Wellesley House School dates back to 1866 but the present main building was built in 1897 to 1898 in 6 acres (2.4 ha) of grounds. The school had been originally called Conyngham House and was located in Ramsgate. In 1929 Haddon Dene School was founded separately. Haddon Dene was initially a boarding and day school for girls, with boys accepted from 1933. During World War II, Haddon Dene expanded and taught older pupils, where as Wellesley House was temporarily evacuated to Rannoch in Scotland while the Broadstairs buildings were used by the British Army. In the 1950s Haddon Dene moved for expansion reasons to a town block away of the grounds of Wellesley House. In 1969 Wellesley House merged with St Peter's Court, another local prep school, whose grounds were then redeveloped. St Peter's Court had had two sons of King George V as pupils. The King felt corporal punishment of Prince George, Duke of Kent when he swam too far out to sea at Joss Bay, despite being warned not to, was appropriate. Wellesley House School itself taught one of the Dukes of Gloucester in the 1950s and other prominent pupils included Mike d'Abo, Chris Cowdrey and William Fox-Pitt. Wellesley's House first headmaster was C.H. Rose followed by C.R. Taylor. Another early headmaster was Leonard Moon. Originally a typical boys-only boarding prep school, girls were admitted in 1977. Haddon Dene school's first headmistress was Miss Olive Vyse who continued until 1968. Haddon Dene was without boarders at the time of the merger, and with smaller grounds.

On 22 September 2022, Haddon Dene School merged with Wellesley House School to form the newly named Wellesley Haddon Dene School. The Premises for the new school are as for Wellesley House School, at 114 Ramsgate Road, Broadstairs. It was planned that the merger could eventually lead to an expansion of pupil number to a maximum of 320 pupils.

The school has a number of pupils with Special educational needs and disability (SEND), which in 2023 stood at 23.

== Academics ==
As with prep schools that educate children up to age 11. Wellesley Haddon Dene prepares pupils for the Kent Test (11+) alongside potential pathways to Independent education .

== Former pupils ==
Former pupils are known as "Old Welleslians". This list includes former pupils from St Peter's Court, which closed in 1969 and merged with Wellesley House.

Armed Forces

- Peter de la Billière, former Commander-in-Chief of British Forces in the 1990 Gulf War
- Sir Henry Leach, former First Sea Lord at the time of the 1982 Falklands War who convinced Margaret Thatcher to re-take the islands
- John Ruggles-Brise, Honorary Colonel in the Territorial Army

The Arts

- Reginald Bosanquet, former ITN newscaster on ITV
- Sir Jeremy Child, actor
- Pandora Clifford, actress
- Michael Denison, actor
- Siobhan Hewlett, actress
- Patrick Anson, 5th Earl of Lichfield, photographer
- Oliver Preston, cartoonist
- Sir Jocelyn Stevens, Chairman of English Heritage
- Heathcote Williams, poet, playwright, actor and anarchist

Business

- Neil Sclater-Booth, former New York City financier
- John Cobbold
- Patrick Cobbold
- Robin Leigh-Pemberton, former Governor of the Bank of England
- Sir Adrian Swire, Hong Kong–based businessman

Politics

- James Arbuthnot, Conservative MP
- Sir John Arbuthnot, 1st Bt, former Conservative MP
- Henry Bellingham, Conservative MP
- Lord Jellicoe, former First Lord of the Admiralty
- Ian Liddell-Grainger, Conservative MP
- Nicholas Lyell, former Conservative MP

Royalty and nobility

- Prince Henry, Duke of Gloucester
- Prince George, Duke of Kent
- Prince William of Gloucester
- Prince Richard, Duke of Gloucester
- Henry Alan Walter Richard Percy, 11th Duke of Northumberland
- Ralph George Algernon Percy, 12th Duke of Northumberland

Sportsmen and sportswomen

- Graham Cowdrey, former cricketer
- Chris Cowdrey, former cricketer
- Oliver Sherwood, National Hunt racing trainer
- William Fox-Pitt, Silver Medal-winning Olympic equestrian competitor
- Georgina Harland, Bronze Medal-winning Olympic athlete
- Alex Loudon, former cricketer
- George Mann, former cricketer
- Tony Nash, Gold Medal-winning Olympic bobsleigh competitor
- Sam Northeast, Hampshire cricketer and former Kent Captain
- Jordan Cox, Kent cricketer
- Ollie Robinson, Sussex cricketer

Writers

- Simon Astaire, author, agent and media advisor
- David Goodhart, political commentator and founder of Prospect
- Jonathon Porritt, environmental journalist
- Tom Stacey, novelist and former foreign correspondent
- Hew Strachan, military historian
