= Westlands School, Sittingbourne =

Westlands School

Location
- Westlands Avenue; Sittingbourne, Kent, ME10 1PF; England
- Coordinates: 51.3427°N 0.71104°E

Information
- Type: Academy
- Department for Education URN: 136286 Tables
- Ofsted: Reports
- Trust Principal: Jonathan Whitcombe
- Gender: Coeducational
- Age: 11 to 18
- Capacity: 1742+
- Houses: Year 11 and more
- Colours: Yellow, Green, Red, Blue and Grey
- Website: www.westlands.org.uk

Westlands School is a coeducational secondary school and sixth form with academy status, located in Sittingbourne in the English county of Kent.

Previously a foundation school administered by Kent County Council, Westlands School converted to academy status on 1 September 2010. Westlands School has specialist status in Mathematics, Computing & Science. The school is now part of the Swale Academies Trust which also includes Westlands Primary School, Regis Manor Primary School, Meopham School and The Sittingbourne School.

Westlands School offers GCSEs and BTECs as programmes of study for pupils, while students in the sixth form have the option to study from a range of A-levels, City and Guilds courses and further BTECs.

It is the largest school in Sittingbourne, with a total of 1,742 students. The school Is adapting new communities which include a separate year 11 group.
