= Great Chart =

Village in Kent, England

Coordinates: 51.1409°N 0.8372°E

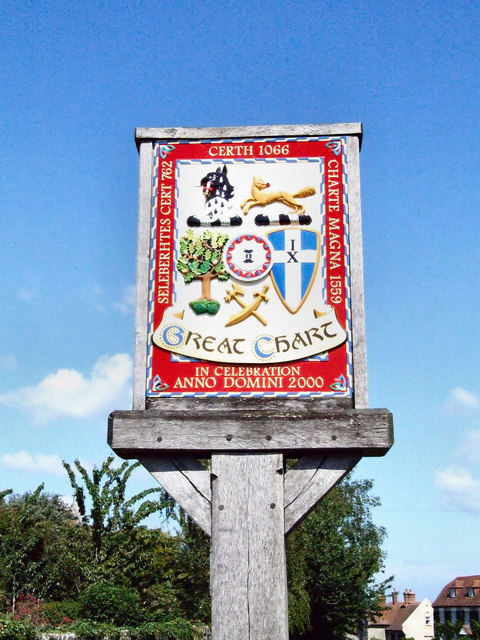
- Great Chart village sign

- Location within Kent
- Area: 13.31 km^{2} (5.14 sq mi)
- Population: 6,801 (civil parish)
  - Density: 511/km^{2} (1,320/sq mi)
- OS grid reference: TQ983422
- Civil parish: Great Chart with Singleton
- District: Ashford
- Shire county: Kent
- Region: South East
- Country: England
- Sovereign state: United Kingdom
- Post town: Ashford
- Postcode district: TN23
- Dialling code: 01233
- Police: Kent
- Fire: Kent
- Ambulance: South East Coast
- UK Parliament: Ashford

Great Chart is a village and former civil parish, now in the parish of Great Chart with Singleton, in the Ashford borough of Kent, England. The parish is split between the ancient village of Great Chart and the modern Singleton neighbourhood on the western outskirts of Ashford. The village centre of Great Chart is 2 miles (3.2 km) from the town centre. In 1961 the parish had a population of 969.

== History ==
Great Chart is first mentioned in 762 as Seleberhtes Cert, a Jutish name. It is also known that at this year, the village was operating a mechanical water mill, the first water mill to be recorded in Britain. A charter first mentions Seleberhtes Cert when recording that King Ethelberht II (of Kent) exchanged half the use of the successfully operating mill for some pasture in the Weald.

In 776 Great Chart's manor, the village, its lands and much of its produce were sold by King Egbert (Ethelberht's successor) to Archbishop Jænberht of Canterbury to raise finances for a Kentish army - to rebel against King Offa of Mercia. In that year there was a great battle between Mercians and Kentish men at Otford as, apparently, a red cross appeared in the sky.

For nine years after this battle Egbert held Kent, but ultimately Offa took control and retrieved Great Chart and its lands from Canterbury dividing them up among his followers. After Offa died in 796 his successor Coenwulf of Mercia decided to reinstate properties, including Great Chart, back to the ownership of Canterbury. This ownership continued for hundreds of years through the Norman Conquest - the Domesday Book entry for Certh (Great Chart) makes clear that it was still in the possession of the Archbishop of Canterbury and had two mills, a salt-pit, feeding ground for a hundred hogs, and a population of fifty-two - up to the advent of Henry VIII when between 1536 and 1539 he dissolved all monasteries. He confiscated Great Chart and its lands from the priory but soon reinstated them to his new Protestant Dean and Chapter in whose administration they remained until Victorian times (though in a map of the area from 1621 the lands are still attributed to 'Christ Churche', referring to Christ Church in Canterbury). On a map made of the Chart and Longbridge Hundred in 1559, the village was named Charte Magna.

On 1 April 1987 the civil parish of "Great Chard" was abolished to form "Great Chart with Singleton", part went to Hothfield and Kingsnorth and the unparished area of Ashford.

On 10 March 2021 police found human remains in a wood near the village. On 12 March 2021 they were confirmed to be those of Sarah Everard.

== Description ==
Great Chart is a largely agricultural village with the farms in the area producing cereals and grass for cattle and sheep. The north-east quarter contains most of the housing in alike construction 20th and 21st century neighbourhoods. A cluster of listed buildings is in the old centre of Great Chart, along the main road in the village (the Street). The area drains via many streams and underwater drainage to the West Stour along the northern boundary before its merger into the Great Stour in Ashford.

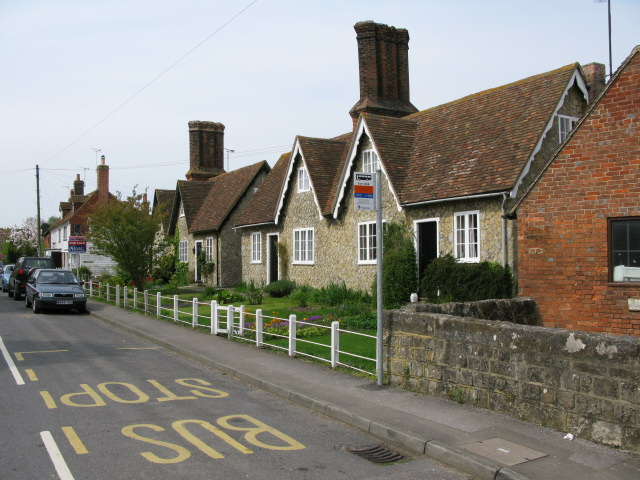
The Street in Great Chart

== Amenities ==
Great Chart has one pub The Swan and Dog. The Little Black Dog, formerly The Hoodener's Horse, has had a planning application submitted for conversion into a three bedroom dwelling.

Pilgrims Football Club with age groups from U7s to seniors is resident at the playing field.

A cricket club with competing elevens (XIs), including colts sides have a ground and pavilion in the village.

The medieval parish church is of an ecclesiastical parish on the same boundaries and is dedicated to St Mary; its community in Singleton is larger than that in the church at meetings in the village hall.

Cross-village sports clubs, gardening clubs and social circles cover the area.

== Former residents ==
Victoria Cross recipient Major William Leet died in Great Chart.

== Transport ==
The village is located near the A28 road, which connects it to junction 9 of the M20 motorway in Ashford. The bus route 2 operated by Stagecoach in East Kent connects the village with Ashford town centre and Ashford International railway station.
