= Grove Green =

Housing development in Kent, England

Coordinates: 51°16′38″N 0°33′7″E

Grove Green is a suburban housing development, near the town of Maidstone in Kent, England, partially forming a part of Weavering village. The population of the development is included in the civil parish of Boxley. It lies near the village of Bearsted and the M20 motorway.

The name "Grove Green" has historic roots, classified as a "forestal name" of "woodland origin" in John William Horsley's 1921 study. In 1956, the 660-acre Vinters House estate that Grove Green lies on was sold to Percy Barden, a property developer. The house suffered damage from a fire soon after, and was demolished in the same year. The remains of the house are located at the nearby Vinters Valley Nature Reserve. Grove Green was built upon the market farm in the Eastern part of the estate. Similarly, nearby Vinters Park housing estate was built upon the former hop and wheat fields to the west. A remaining 90 acres (360,000 m^{2}) of former estate land is maintained by the Vinters Valley Nature Reserve.

The Maidstone Studios are also nearby which has resulted in the area being used for many television programs including Cats Eyes, Tittybangbang, and What's Up Doc.

The development includes a primary school, supermarket, community centre, a doctors' surgery and other small shops, as well as two pubs. The Minor Centre shopping area is within Grove Green.
