= Chilmington Green =

Hamlet in Kent, England

Coordinates: 51.13°N 0.8327°E

- Location within Kent
- District: Ashford
- Shire county: Kent
- Region: South East
- Country: England
- Sovereign state: United Kingdom
- Post town: ASHFORD
- Postcode district: TN23
- Dialling code: 01233
- Police: Kent
- Fire: Kent
- Ambulance: South East Coast
- UK Parliament: Weald of Kent

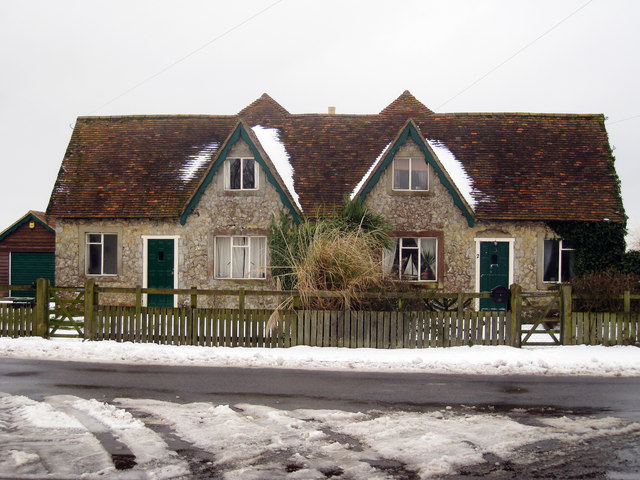
A pair of semi-detached Gothic cottages, Chilmington Green

Chilmington Green was a hamlet on the south-west edge of the town of Ashford, Kent. It contains 10 listed buildings. The population at the 2011 Census was included in the civil parish of Great Chart with Singleton.

In 2016, Ashford Borough Council gave outline planning permission for a new development of 5,750 houses along with a secondary school, four primary schools, shops and healthcare and sports facilities on a 1,000 acres of agricultural land around the hamlet. As of February 2025, many of the planned houses have been built, one primary school is open, and the secondary school opened in September 2025.
