= The Sittingbourne School =

Location
- Swanstree Avenue; Sittingbourne, Kent, ME10 4NL; England
- Coordinates: 51°20′02″N 0°45′25″E

Information
- Type: Academy
- Department for Education URN: 137687 Tables
- Ofsted: Reports
- Head teacher: Nick Smith
- Age: 11 to 18
- Website: www.thesittingbourneschool.org.uk

The Sittingbourne School is a secondary school and sixth form with academy status located in Sittingbourne, Kent, with around 1600 students. This school was previously called "The Sittingbourne Community College".

The school is part of the Swale Academies Trust which also includes Westlands Nursery, Westlands Primary School, Regis Manor Primary School, South Borough Primary School, Beaver Green Primary School, Westlands School and Meopham School.
