= Weavering =

Village in Maidstone, Kent, England

Coordinates: 51.273624°N 0.559219°E

- Location within Kent
- OS grid reference: TQ 786560
- District: Maidstone
- Shire county: Kent
- Region: South East
- Country: England
- Sovereign state: United Kingdom
- Post town: MAIDSTONE
- Postcode district: ME14
- Dialling code: 01622
- Police: Kent
- Fire: Kent
- Ambulance: South East Coast
- UK Parliament: Faversham & Mid Kent; Maidstone & Malling (part)

Weavering is a village, mainly consisting of parts of the Grove Green and Bearsted Park housing Estates, centred on Weavering Street, within the borough of Maidstone, Kent in South East England that was formerly farmland. At the 2014 Census the population of the village was included in the civil parish of Thurnham.

== History of Weavering ==
The settlement grew from the small hamlet of Weavering Street. Prior to the housing development, residents of this road tended to class themselves as part of Bearsted, hence even today, many residents of this road include Bearsted in their address, despite technically being part of Weavering.

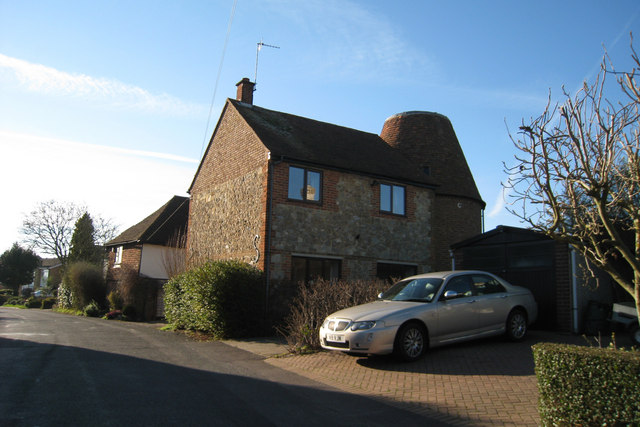
This former oast house on Weavering Street

The name, Weavering can at least be traced back to the early 20th century, as it can be seen on Ordnance Survey maps from the time, however, it is likely the name is much older, as houses dating from the Middle Ages are present on the Weavering Street, suggesting it has ancient origins. What is now the housing estate one formed part of a vast, formerly prosperous and rich country estate, which had passed through several owners, including the Whatman family, who are often mentioned in the history of Maidstone. Weavering, as the area is today, covers the old market farm, which made up the eastern side of the estate. Similarly, the nearby Vinters Park housing estate, covers former wheat and hop fields to the west. The land in between, currently around 90 acres (36 ha), is maintained as a local nature reserve, Vinters Valley Nature Reserve. The old manor house once stood in this nature reserve, but was burnt down around 1960, just after much of the land was sold to housing developers. Today, the remaining part of the estate is owned by Kent County Council, but is leased to the reserve trust.

== Housing developments ==
In the late 1980s, Abbey Homes, a housing development company developed the area, and built the Grove Green housing estate. Many of the roads are named as to reflect the former farmland, for example, Crownfields, Meadowdown, Harvesters Way, Provender Way, Cornflower Close, Haywain Close, etc. Despite the large scale development, the old character of the traditional hamlet has been retained. Many, if not all, of the original buildings from the old settlement remain, including several homes from the Middle Ages along Weavering Street itself, as well as a group of farmhouses behind the Tesco superstore, now only accessible from a small cul-de-sac, Wingrove Drive.

In the late 1990s, a large area of open space, left by the first phase of development was built upon, to increase the number of houses, along what is now known as Grovewood Drive North. The two sections of Grovewood Drive were originally planned to be linked together to form one long road giving access to the whole of the area. However, in the early 1990s when the time came for this work to be completed, residents fought back, and decided it was more appropriate to leave the roads separate, to maintain the peaceful nature of the area. Today, Grove Green and Weavering in general have become desirable places to live within the borough, with the proximity to town centre, local amenities, and local scenery, for example Banky meadow. The boundaries of the area can be defined by several features. To the South, there is Ashford Road, to the North-East, there is Bearsted Road, To the South-East, there is a railway line and further down the valley, a stream, and to the West, there is New Cut Road. Weavering Street once connected Ashford Road and Bearsted Road, but bollards were put up after the construction of the housing estate to prevent a dangerous 'rat run' route.

== Local amenities ==
- 2 Community halls
- For young people, there is a youth group, and Grove Green Scout Group
- Numerous play parks
- The Minor Centre shopping area is within Weavering
- KIMS Hospital, situated on the Kent Medical Campus
- The nearest train station is at Bearsted

== Weavering Diamond Jubilee Orchard ==
In 2012, Boxley Parish Council created an orchard to celebrate the Diamond Jubilee of Queen Elizabeth II. The orchard was planted on former orchard land, and contains apple, pear, cherry, and damson trees, amongst other varieties. The orchard is maintained by the community, and fruit is harvested by the local residents for their own use each autumn. The orchard was officially opened by the Earl and Countess of Wessex in April 2012.
