= Barton Court Grammar School =

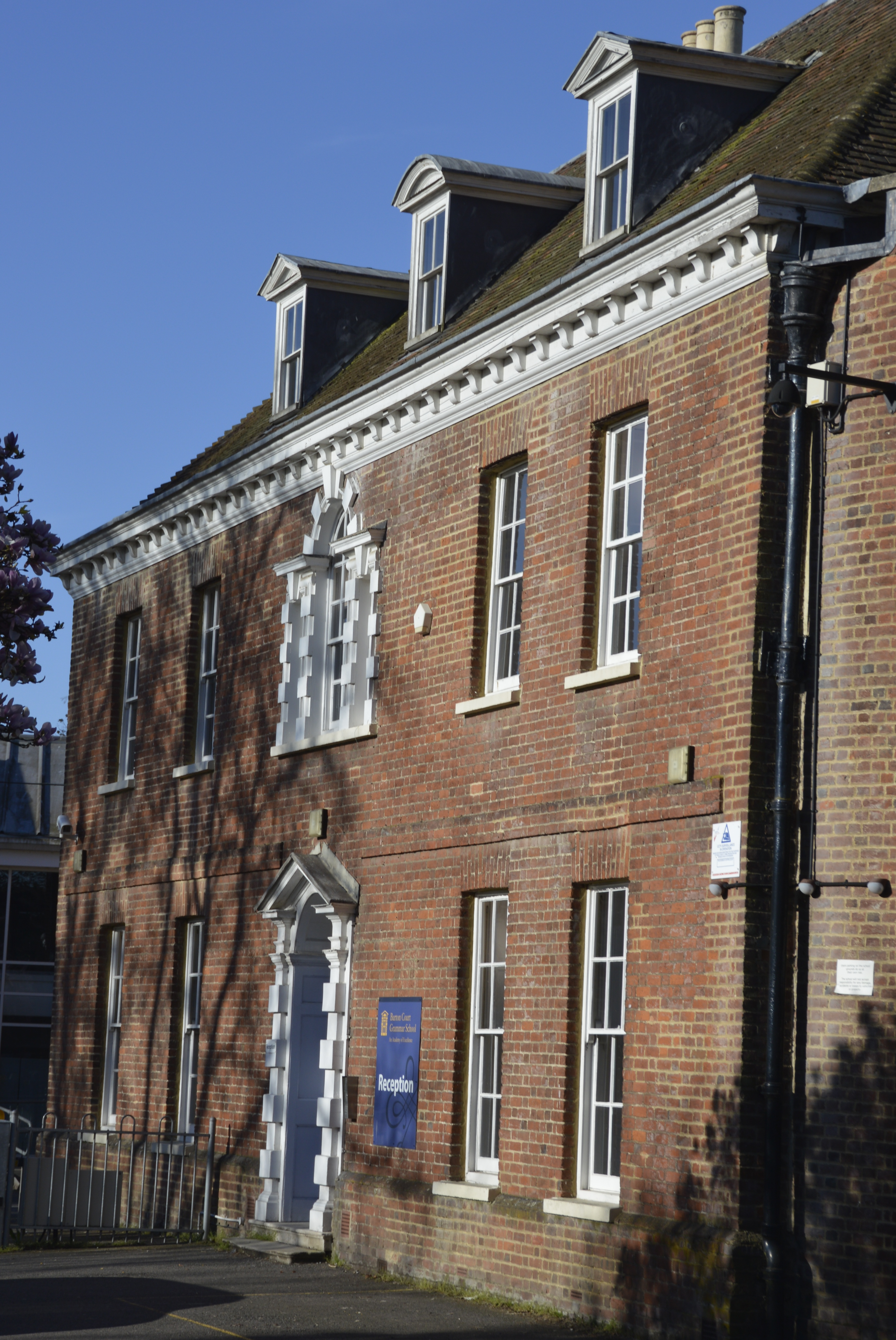
- The "Old House", the original 1767 manor house

Location
- Longport; Canterbury, Kent, CT1 1PH; England; 51°16′36″N 1°5′30″E

Information
- Former name: Canterbury Technical School for Girls, Barton Court Grammar School for Girls
- Type: Grammar school; Academy
- Motto: Support, inspire, achieve
- Local authority: Kent County Council
- Trust: Barton Court Academy Trust
- Department for Education URN: 137474 Tables
- Ofsted: Reports
- Chair of Governors: William Speed
- Head teacher: John Hopkins
- Executive headteacher: Kirstin Cardus
- Staff: 73 full time (54 teachers)
- Gender: Mixed
- Age: 11 to 18
- Enrolment: 1002 (academic year 2022/23)
- Houses: Nightingale, Einstein, Wilberforce, Pankhurst, Turing
- Colours: Blue and Gold
- Publication: The Barton Pressed
- Forms: B, C, G, S, A
- Website: www.bartoncourt.org

Barton Court Grammar School (formerly Canterbury Technical School for Girls and Barton Court Grammar School for Girls) is an 11-18 mixed Academy of Excellence in Canterbury, Kent, England. It has Foreign Language College status and offers GCSEs, A-Levels and BTEC level 3.

== History ==
The school was founded before World War II as the Canterbury Technical School for Girls. It shared the old hospital site on the north side of Longport, along with the equivalent for boys (which became Chaucer School) and the Technical College (which became Canterbury College). It moved across the road to the present site in 1945.

Past Headmistresses were Miss E. Blackith (who retired in 1967) and followed by Mrs V. Arnold, Mrs J. Byers, and Headmasters Mr. J. Matthews and Dr. S. Manning.

In September 2007 the school replaced A-levels with the International Baccalaureate. From September 2011 the school re-introduced A-levels but kept the International Baccalaureate, giving students the option to do either. The school held a Foreign Language College status, and the school has transferred to the International Baccalaureate award scheme for those pupils in Years 12 and 13. Study of this course has begun from September 2007, and the first set of official results were published on 6 July 2009. The results were above the world average, and the school put the Middle Years Program (a version of the International Baccalaureate for younger pupils) into use. MYP (Middle Years Program) was stopped shortly before the end of 2010 and was replaced on the timetable by ICT. The International Baccalaureate was also discontinued in 2015.

The school spent an estimated £5 million on new Maths and Biology classrooms in January 2018.

=== Academy governance ===
On 1 September 2011, Barton Court Grammar School became an Academy. Barton Court did not change its name as it wished to keep it the same.

=== Barton Manor School ===
In September 2022, Barton Court's sister school, Barton Manor School opened, which it shares teachers and facilities with.

== Campus ==
The school stands on what was the farm of St Augustine's Abbey across the road; 'Barton' stems from 'bere tun' or 'barley enclosure'. The school is built around the lake in which the monks of the Abbey farmed fish. The campus has the sixth Ginkgo tree to be introduced in England from China. The other five were planted in Kew Gardens.

The main house of the school was built between 1767 and 1799 as a manor house with the name 'Barton Manor'; the other buildings include a 1961 block, which is now the hall and corridor, a language block in 2001 and technology classrooms in 2007.

== Curriculum ==
Kent is one of the counties in England that retains selection. This is a selective school: pupils gain entry by sitting the Kent test, an eleven-plus test. The school offers 15 subjects at Key Stage Three: Mathematics, English, Science, French, Spanish, Geography, History, PE, Design Technology (including Food) Music, Art, Drama, Computing, Religion, Philosophy & Ethics and Careers Education. Pupils choose their GCSEs in year 8, to begin studies in year 9; the GCSEs offered are English Language, English Literature, Mathematics, Biology, Chemistry, Physics, French or Spanish, History or Geography, Religion, Philosophy and Ethics, Core PE and two of the following: Art, Computer Science, Design Technology, Drama, Food Preparation and Nutrition, Geography, History, French, Spanish, German, Music, Psychology and Physical Education. In the sixth form (Key Stage 5) students choose 3 or 4 subjects along with a compulsory Extended Project Qualification (EPQ). The A level options are: Art. Biology, Chemistry, Computer Science, Drama, English Literature, French, Film Studies, Geography, Government and Politics, History, Mathematics, Further Mathematics, Music, Philosophy, Photography, Physics, Product Design, Psychology, Sociology and Spanish. BTEC; Applied Science, Business, Health and Social Care and Sport.

== Extracurricular activities ==
The school has an orchestra, choir, dungeons and dragons club, geography club, maths club, public speaking club, drama club LGBTQIA+ club, Christian union, film club and Eco schools club.
