= Hartsdown Academy =

Coordinates: 51°22′47″N 1°22′7″E

Location
- George V Avenue; Margate, Kent; England

Information
- Type: Academy
- Established: 1958
- Department for Education URN: 136571 Tables
- Ofsted: Reports
- Head teacher: Mr Ian Wallace
- Gender: Coeducational
- Age: 11 to 18
- Website: http://www.hartsdown.org

Hartsdown Academy is a secondary school with academy status in Margate in southeast England, which teaches years 7–14 (UK school years; age range 11–19 years). It has approximately 750 students.
