= John Wallis Academy =

John Wallis Church of England Academy

Location
- Millbank Road; Ashford, Kent, TN23 3HG; England
- Coordinates: 51°07′39″N 0°51′21″E

Information
- Type: Academy
- Religious affiliation: Church of England
- Local authority: Kent
- Specialist: Maths and Computing
- Department for Education URN: 136197 Tables
- Ofsted: Reports
- Principal: no
- Gender: Mixed
- Age: 3 to 10
- Enrolment: 1414
- Colour: Black/Red
- Website: http://www.thejohnwallisacademy.org/

The John Wallis Church of England Academy is a mixed all-through school with academy status in Ashford, Kent. It was known as Christ Church Church of England High School. On 1 September 2010 it became an academy, sponsored by the Diocese of Canterbury, Benenden School and Canterbury Christ Church University. The school specialises in Maths and Computing and is named after Ashford-born mathematician John Wallis.

The school officially became a 3-19 academy on 31 August 2012, educating pupils of primary and Secondary school ages, as well as a sixth form provision. The school holds places for 1400 students aged 3–19.

== History ==
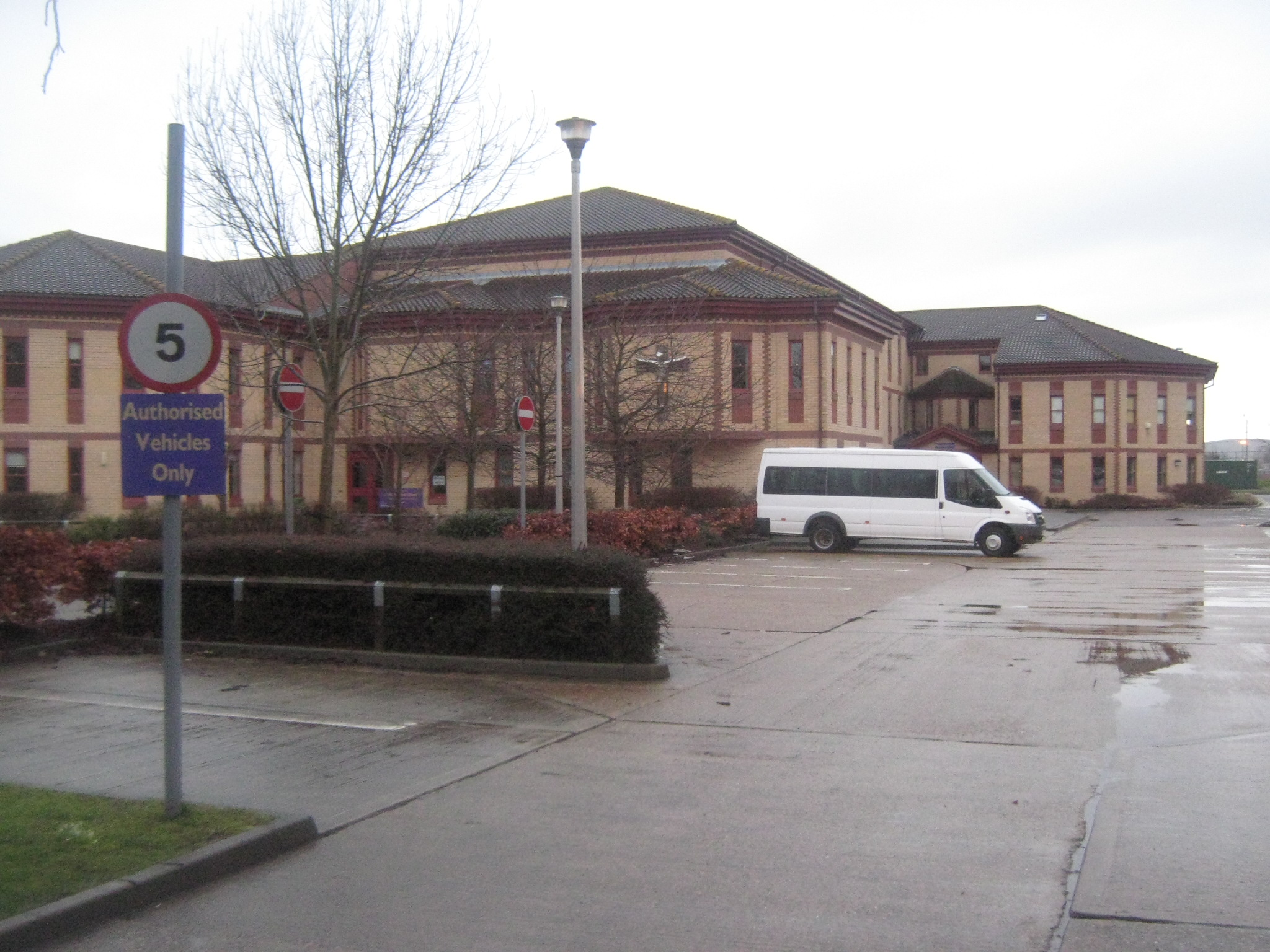
Christ Church School, 2010, now named John Wallis Academy

The high school attracted media attention after a pepper spray attack in February 2008.
