= St George's Church of England Foundation School =

St George's C of E Foundation School

Location
- Westwood Road; Broadstairs, Kent, CT10 2LH; England; 51.3615°N 1.4078°E

Information
- Type: Foundation school
- Religious affiliation: Church of England
- Established: 1973
- Founder: The Reverend Richard Harvey
- Local authority: Kent
- Department for Education URN: 118919 Tables
- Ofsted: Reports
- Headteacher: A. Mirams
- Gender: Coeducational
- Age: 4 to 19
- Colour: Navy/Red
- Website: stgeorges-school.org.uk

St George's Church of England Foundation School, often referred to as St George's, is an all-through school in Broadstairs, Kent, catering for students for 4 to 19 years (primary and through secondary). The school was created in the mid-1970s by joining the two old schools of St George's Boys School and St George's Girls C of E School (founded 1841) together into one building.

== History ==
The original St George's School opened in Ramsgate in 1841. In September 1967, St George's Girls C of E School moved from Ramsgate to a new building in Broadstairs near Dane Court Grammar School, with St George's Boys School moving to the site in 1973, after the construction of more facilities. By 1975 it was a co-educational school called St George's C of E School, and later became a Business and an Enterprise school. The 1960s and 1970s buildings stood until early 2010, when it was knocked down and a school building was built next to the site.

The new school building was part of the Government's 'Building Schools for the Future' scheme. It cost about £23M, with state-of-the-art facilities and modern equipment in all areas. The old buildings were almost entirely demolished. Although the school wasn't officially opened until September 2010, staff moved in on 20 April 2010, Year 11 and Sixth Form on 21 April, Years 9 and 10 on the 22nd and Years 7 and 8 came in on the 22nd.

Due to the demand for a new primary school in the Thanet area, St George's received funding to build a new primary phase to open in September 2016. This was the first time that the school had a Primary Section since 1925.

== Notable former pupils ==
- Sid Gueran, Footballer
- Sir William Jordan, Former High Commissioner for New Zealand
- Hannen Swaffer, Journalist
