= Royal Harbour Academy =

Coordinates: 51.3500°N 1.3920°E

The Royal Harbour Academy
- Ramsgate, Kent; England

Information
- Type: Academy
- Local authority: Kent County Council
- Trust: Coastal Academies Trust
- Department for Education URN: 149554 Tables
- Ofsted: Reports
- Head of School: Kristian Lasslett
- Gender: Coeducational
- Age: 11 to 18
- Enrolment: 916 as of March 2023
- Houses: Deal, Dover, Hever & Walmer
- Colours: Yellow, Blue, Red & Green
- Website: http://www.rha.kent.sch.uk/

The Royal Harbour Academy is a coeducational secondary school and sixth form located over two sites in Ramsgate, Kent.

The school was formed in September 2015 from the merger of The Ellington and Hereson School located on Newlands Lane (the current Lower School site) and The Marlowe Academy located on Stirling Way (the current Upper School site).

== History ==
=== Newlands Lane (Lower School) ===
Previously Ellington School for Girls, the school amalgamated with The Hereson School (a boys' school in Broadstairs) in September 2009, and was renamed The Ellington and Hereson School. The school was initially based on the two former school sites, but all pupils were transferred to the former Ellington School site on Newlands Lane in 2011 (the Ellington School had been rebuilt in 2007).

In March 2015 it was announced that The Ellington and Hereson School was proposed to merge with The Marlowe Academy from September 2015. Reasons for the merger included that the site for The Ellington and Hereson School was restricting its growth as a successful school.

=== Stirling Way (Upper School) ===
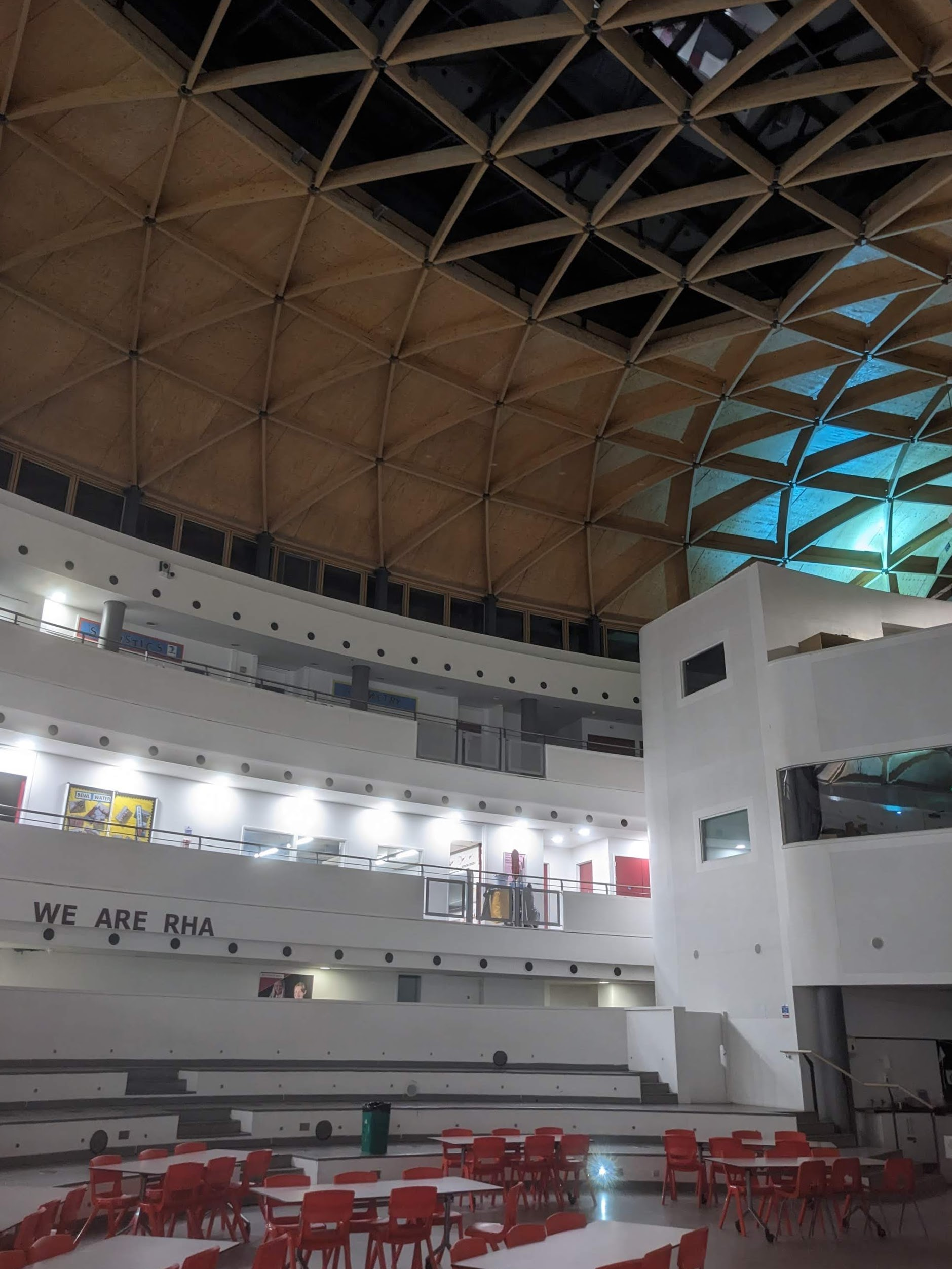
Atrium of the upper school building.

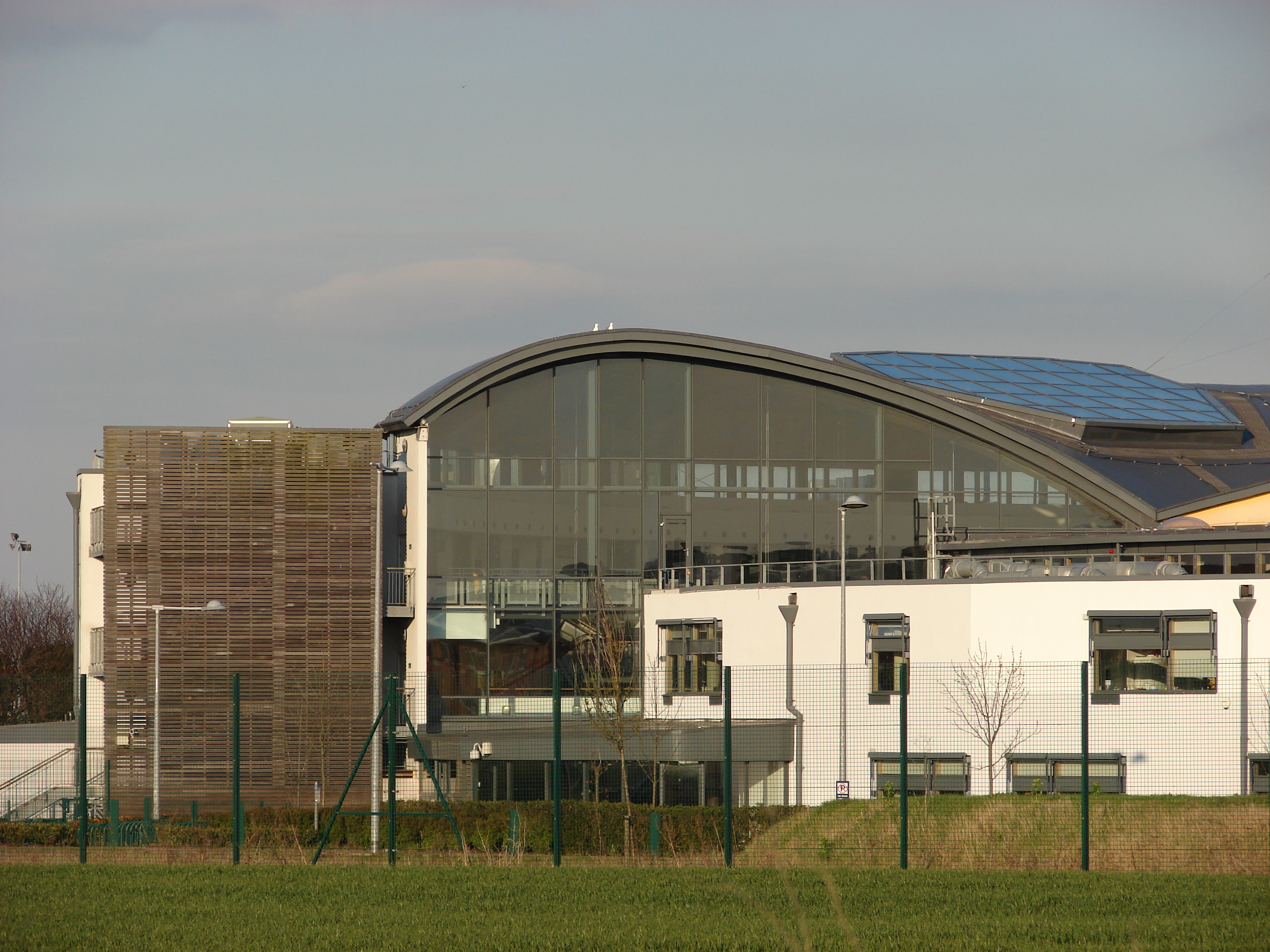
The Upper School site, formerly The Marlowe Academy

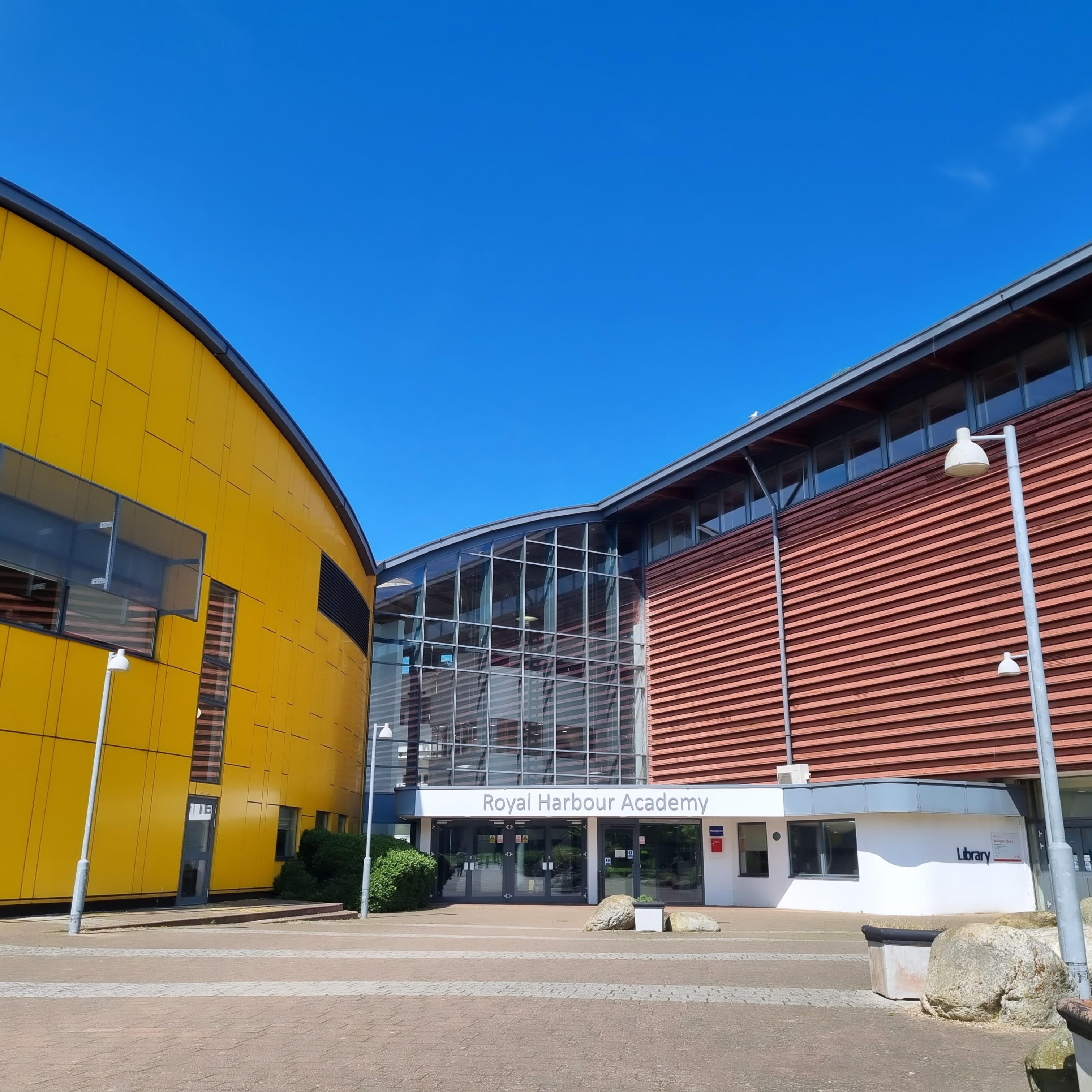
Entrance of the upper site

The Marlowe Academy was founded in 2005 as an academy, with £30 million spent on the new school buildings designed by BDP. It was intended to replace the existing Ramsgate School (previously known as Conyngham School), which had been marked as "failing" after inspections by the Office for Standards in Education, Children's Services and Skills (Ofsted).

In January 2011, the school leaders said they were disappointed in its standings in the performance tables, showing it third from last. Still, it said that "this academy was set up to solve the problems in a particular area and we are doing that", with the 67% proportion of pupils achieving five A*-C grades at GCSE being better than previous years. A particular problem faced by the school is described as the "low academic standards of pupils coming into the Academy from local primary schools".

The school was considered amongst "the worst schools in England" following an Ofsted inspection later in 2011, which found that "many Year 10 and 11 pupils had a reading age that was at least two years below their actual age", and placed the school in special measures. However, a subsequent inspection in March 2012 found that the school had made satisfactory progress in all areas inspected. "The number of children gaining five good GCSEs had improved", but was still below expected standards, at only twenty per cent.

Some credit for the improvements was given to temporary principal Carl Wakefield, who was described as having "changed the Marlowe Academy in just nine months". As well as continued improvements in exam results, with an expectation of 84% of students achieving grades between A* and C at GCSE in 2012, as against 64% in 2011 and only 4% in 2005, in May 2012 it was claimed that a greater proportion of students were planning to stay on at the Marlowe Academy for their A-levels, instead of moving to other colleges in the area. The Academy however continued to receive poor Ofsted reports, including in November 2014 when a statement said that "senior leaders, trustees and sponsor are not taking effective action to tackle the areas requiring improvement."

In March 2015 it was announced that Marlowe Academy would merge with the Ellington and Hereson School. Reasons for the merger included that despite improvements, The Marlowe Academy continued to have lower exam results compared the Ellington and Hereson School, and The Marlowe Academy was continuing to see a fall in pupil numbers.

=== The Royal Harbour Academy ===
The merger of The Ellington and Hereson School and The Marlowe Academy was enacted in September 2015, with the new school being renamed The Royal Harbour Academy. Despite the new name, the school was a foundation school, having the same governance arrangements as the former Ellington and Hereson School.

In April 2023 The Royal Harbour Academy converted to an academy, sponsored by the Coastal Academies Trust.
