= King Ethelbert School =

Location
- Canterbury Road; Birchington-on-Sea; Kent, CT7 9BL; England; 51.377°N 1.322°E

Information
- Type: Academy
- Local authority: Kent
- Trust: Coastal Academies Trust
- Department for Education URN: 136584 Tables
- Ofsted: Reports
- Headteacher: Tom Sellen
- Gender: Mixed
- Age: 11 to 18
- Enrolment: 845 as of July 2026
- Houses: Phoenix, Dragon, Griffin, Pegasus, Kraken
- Website: http://www.kingethelbert.com/

King Ethelbert School is a mixed secondary school located in Birchington-on-Sea, Kent, England. A wide variety of subjects are available at GCSE level as well as IB or BTEC in sixth form.

== Facilities ==
The school was one of the last to benefit from the Building Schools for the Future programme. As of December 2025, the school has a number of buildings coded via letters; B, M, R, G, W. As well as a sports hall and a number of portable buildings. In addition, the school is one of many in the country to be affected by RAAC. The school plans to build a new building due to this.

== Notable alumni ==
- Tracey Emin — visual artist
