= Canterbury College, Kent =

Canterbury College
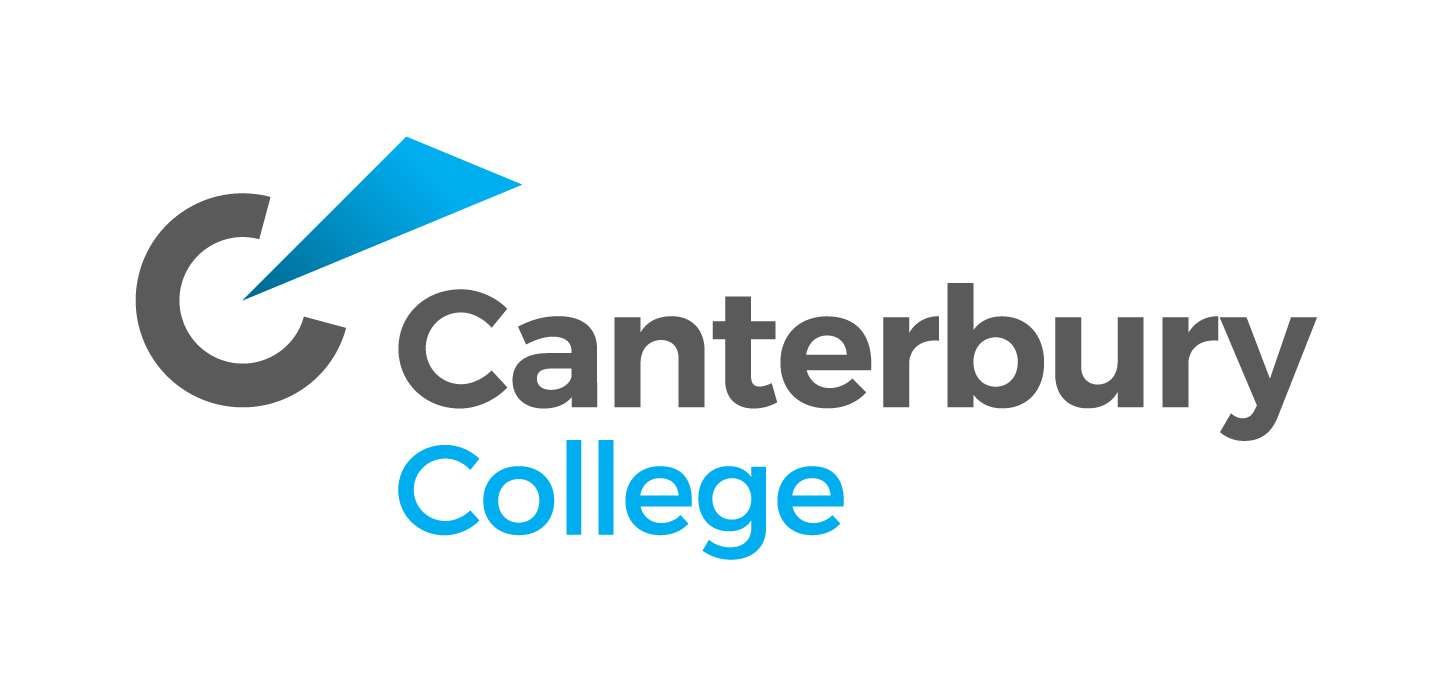
- The logo for Canterbury College, Kent

Location
- New Dover Road; Canterbury, Kent, CT1 3AJ; England; 51.27556°N 1.08972°E

Information
- Type: Further Education College
- Established: 1947
- Local authority: Kent
- Principal: Victoria Copp-Crawley
- Staff: 500
- Gender: Co-educational
- Age: 14+
- Website: www.ekcgroup.ac.uk/colleges/canterbury-college

Canterbury College is a part of the EKC Group of colleges and provides further education in Canterbury, Kent, England. It was established in 1947.

The college has about 3800 students and 500 staff. It predominantly provides courses to students 16 and above. It also offers education to students between ages 14 and 18 years through its Junior College, T Levels, and A Levels courses. Adult learners can also participate in part-time courses and short courses.

The College is situated near the centre of Canterbury on New Dover Road.

== History ==
Canterbury College, originally named Canterbury Technical College, opened in 1947 at the former site of the Kent and Canterbury Hospital and Canterbury Technical School, in Longport in the centre of Canterbury. Despite their similar names, the College and school were not connected. Early courses taught included masonry, plumbing and carpentry. In its early years the College also taught a range of courses then described as ‘Women subjects’, aimed at female students, although these were renamed Home Management and Catering following their expansion in 1964.

The changing nature of education for female students in Britain was of sufficient interest to prompt a question involving Canterbury Technical College in parliament from the MP Terence Boston to the UK Secretary of State for Education and Science, Charles Crossland in 1965. Boston asked if the Secretary of State was satisfied that the facilities for ‘technical education for girls’ was adequate in Kent. Crossland replied that he was satisfied as ‘courses in secretarial work, catering and general crafts, available to girls’ at Canterbury Technical College.

In 1964 Canterbury Technical College began a phased move to newly built premises in New Dover Road, later sharing the site with the Canterbury College of Art. Subjects now included art, advanced cookery, English, household administration, salesmanship, science, social studies, human biology and business studies.

In 2006 the newly renamed Canterbury College completed Phase 1 of a £50 million campus redevelopment programme, which included the creation of a new Children's Centre, Technology Centre, Land Based Centre, Motor Vehicle Centre and the Post-16 Centre. Two years later phase 2 was completed which included new facilities for students in Hair and Beauty, Sports Therapy, Veterinary Nursing, Public Services, Health and Social Care, Early Years, Supported Learning and Technology.

This redevelopment project at Canterbury College won the LABC South East Building Excellence Awards event held in Brighton in June 2009.

== Spring Lane at Canterbury College ==
Following a turbulent period for its previous managing group, Hadlow Group, the 2ha college campus on Spring Lane was acquired by EKC Group. Due to its close proximity to the Canterbury College site, the Spring Lane provision was integrated with that of the college.

The newly acquired facilities are used by the land-based department, offering a range of courses including Animal Management, Landscaping and Horticulture. To facilitate these subjects, the site is home to polytunnels that include a variety of plants, alongside enclosures for animals which are cared for by students.

In April 2022, EKC Group revealed plans for a major overhaul of the site. The redevelopment aims are to update the educational facilities, and to reduce the carbon footprint of the Spring Lane at Canterbury College campus.

The site is also home to Canterbury College's Junior College provision, which launched in the 2022/23 academic year. Aimed at 14- to 16-year-olds who intend to go into a land based career, the provision offers GCSEs in Maths, English, and Biology, as well as Level 2 qualifications in Countryside Studies and Personal Growth and Wellbeing.

== EKC Sixth Form College ==
Launching in the 2022/23 academic year, EKC Group used part of the Canterbury College site to create its first A Level provision. EKC Sixth Form College comprises 25 A Level subjects, with the Extended Project qualification.

The first director of the provision is Emma Wilkinson.

== Notable alumni ==
- Christopher Dalton (founder of Jobmate Software)
- Nik Glancy (sculptor)
- Peter Kerry (voiceover actor)
- John Terry Knowler (Professor of Biology, University of Glasgow)
- Jack Lawrence (artist)
- Bortusk Leer (artist)
- James Lock (musician and sound engineer)
- Michael Paraskos (writer/art historian, Imperial College London)
- Andrew Fraser Polmear (Medical Professor, University of Sussex)
- Daniel Postgate (filmmaker)
- Derek Wells (footballer)
