= Meopham School =

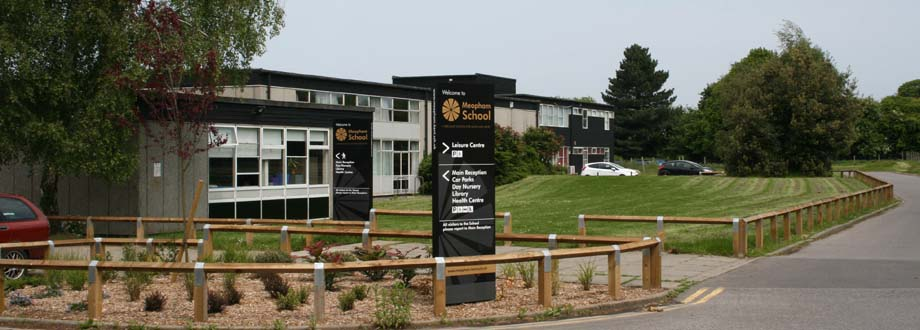

Location
- Wrotham Road; Gravesend, Kent, DA13 0AH; England
- Coordinates: 51.36768°N 0.35787°E

Information
- Type: Academy
- Established: February 1, 2013
- Trust: Swale Academies Trust
- Department for Education URN: 139075 Tables
- Ofsted: Reports
- Headteacher: Glenn Prebble
- Gender: Coeducational
- Age: 11 to 18
- Colours: Black and Gold
- Website: https://www.meophamschool.org.uk/

Meopham School is a coeducational secondary school located in Meopham, Kent, England. It educates approximately 950 students; the school is non-selective and therefore caters to students with a wide range of abilities. The school delivers academic and personal success through a traditional curriculum and a focus on the core subjects of English, Mathematics and Science.

== History ==
Students from Meopham School were chosen to form part of a "guard of honour" for athletes at the opening ceremony of the 2012 Olympic Games, displaying artistic creations made by the school to celebrate the event.

The school converted into an academy on 1st February 2013, technically establishing a new school.

In 2022, the school went into lockdown after two individuals were seen trespassing on the grounds.

Meopham's rating dropped from outstanding to good following an inspection on 19 April 2023.
