= Kent Life =

Farm park in Sandling, Kent, England

Coordinates: 51.2974°N 0.5065°E

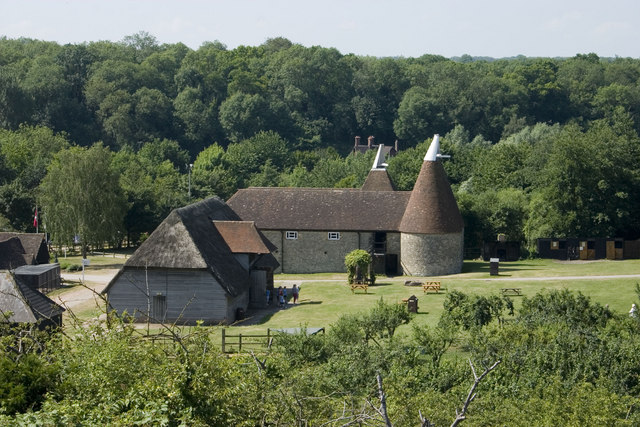
The Kent Life site in 2006, showing the barn and oast

Kent Life (formerly the Museum of Kent Life and Kent Life Heritage Farm Park) is a farm park located at Sandling near Maidstone, next to Allington Locks on the east bank of the River Medway. It once operated as an open-air museum, before rebranding as a heritage farm park. It was renamed as "Kent Life" in 2009.

== History ==
Sir Garrard Tyrwhitt-Drake bequeathed the Cobtree Manor Estate to Maidstone Borough Council in 1966. A part of the estate was Sandling Farm, on the banks of the Medway. In 1984 a decision was made to restore the derelict farm as part of a rural life museum. The museum opened to the public on 6 July 1985. As of 2013 it no longer operates as a museum and rebranded as a Heritage Farm Park, the historic houses are accessible as part of the daily ticket to the attraction which also offers tractor rides, arts and crafts, animal feeding and seasonal events yearly.

== Farming ==
At the museum, various aspects of farming are recreated. There are two small hop gardens, growing Fuggles and Goldings hops. Apple and plum orchards, a herb garden, a soft fruit garden and various livestock.

== Buildings ==
The attraction has a variety of buildings, most of which have been dismantled and re-erected across the site .

=== Barn ===
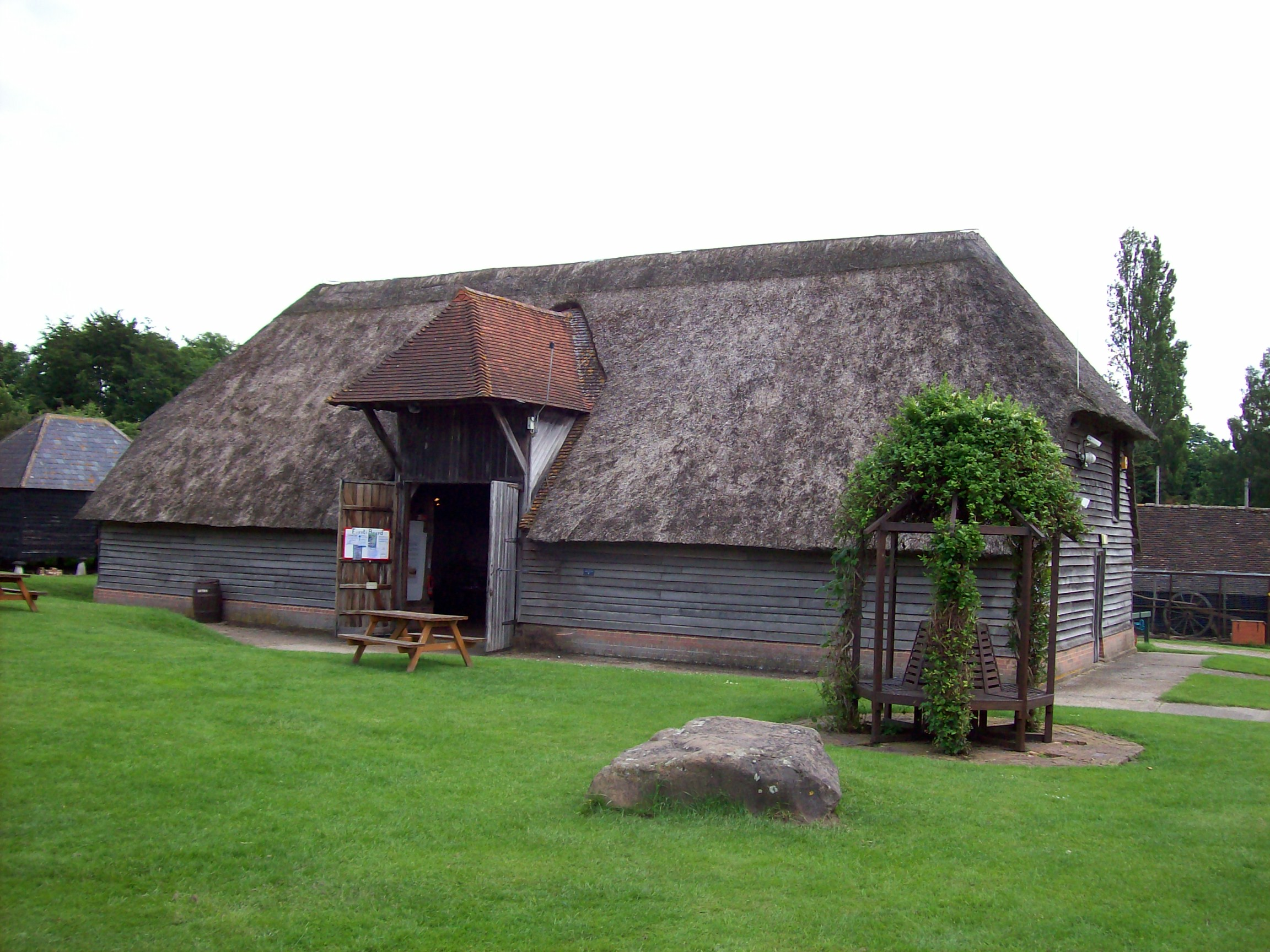
The barn

A five bay barn dating from the eighteenth century and originally at Vale Farm, Calcott, near Sturry. The barn has an oak frame and a thatched roof. It was dismantled in 1984 and re-erected at the museum in 1989.

=== Chapel ===
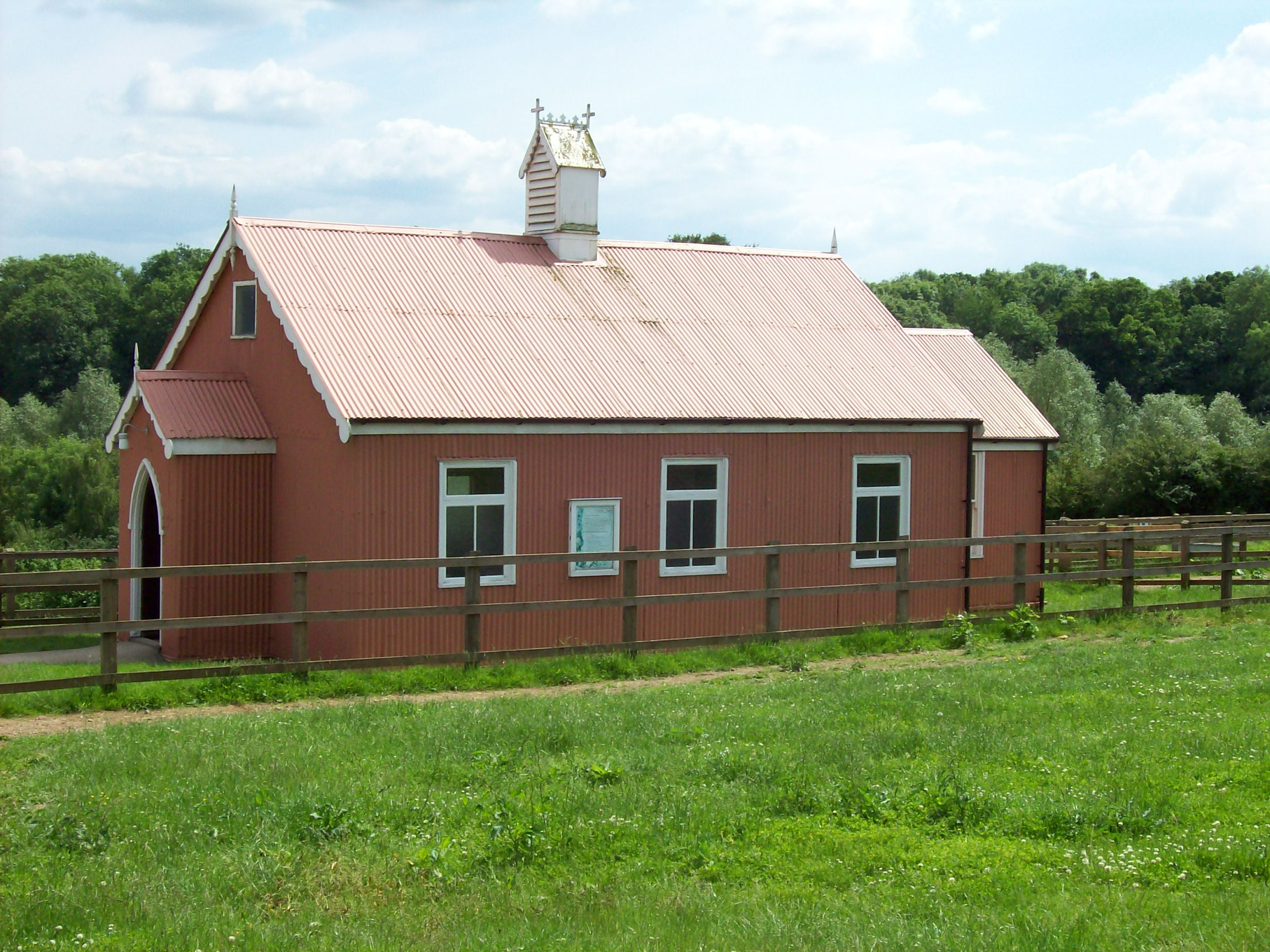
The chapel

The chapel is a timber-framed building clad in corrugated iron (a tin tabernacle). It was originally built in 1897 in Cuxton and was donated to the museum in 2000 when a new chapel was built.

=== Lenham Cottages ===
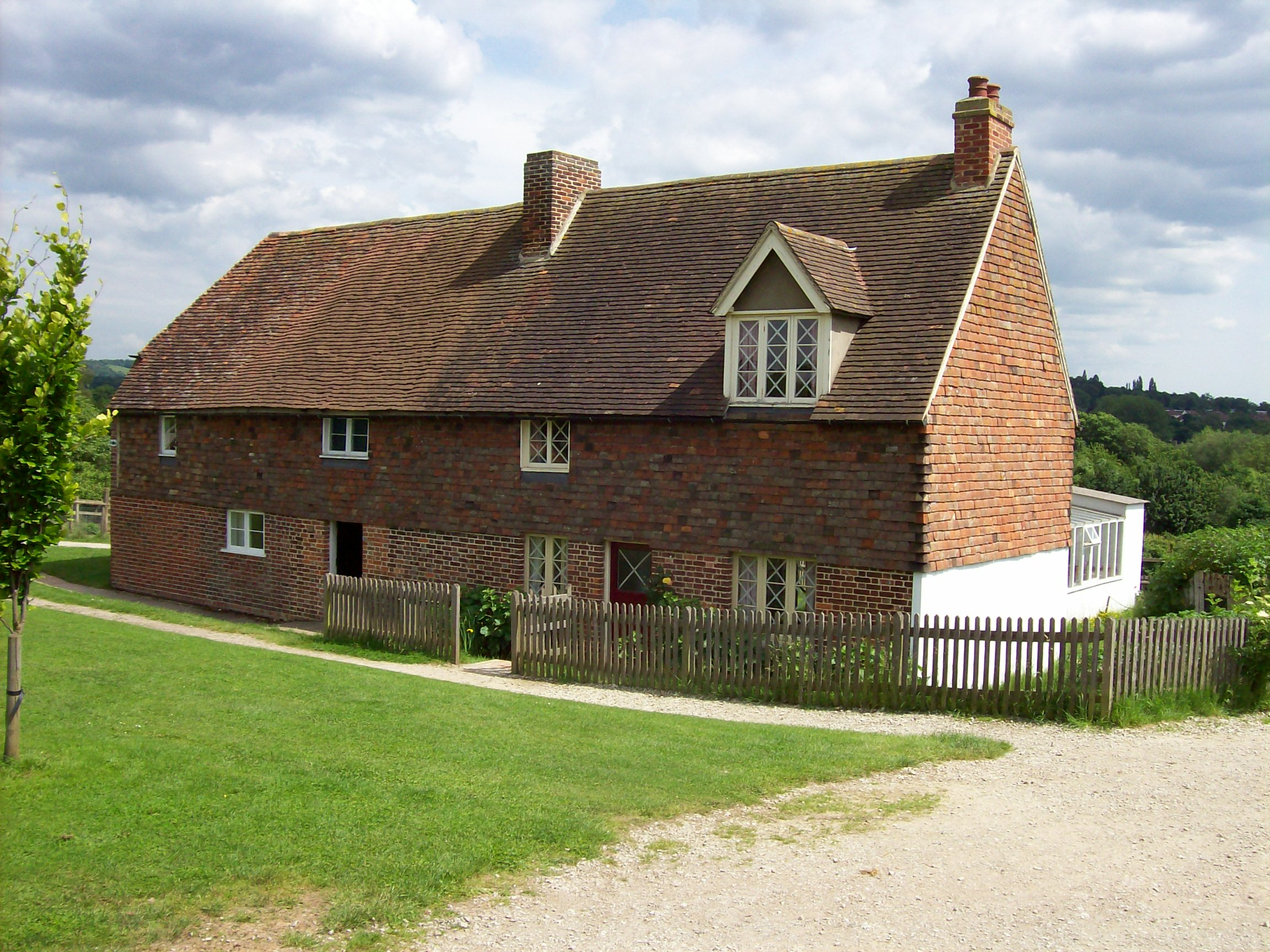
Old Cottage and Water Street Cottage

Originally called Old Cottage and Water Street Cottage, these cottages stood at Lenham. The Grade II listed building were threatened by the building of the Channel Tunnel rail link. The builder of the link offered the cottages to the museum, along with the funding for their removal and re-erection. They were dismantled in June 1999, and re-erected between January 2000 and March 2001, opening to the public in July 2001.

=== Petts Farmhouse ===
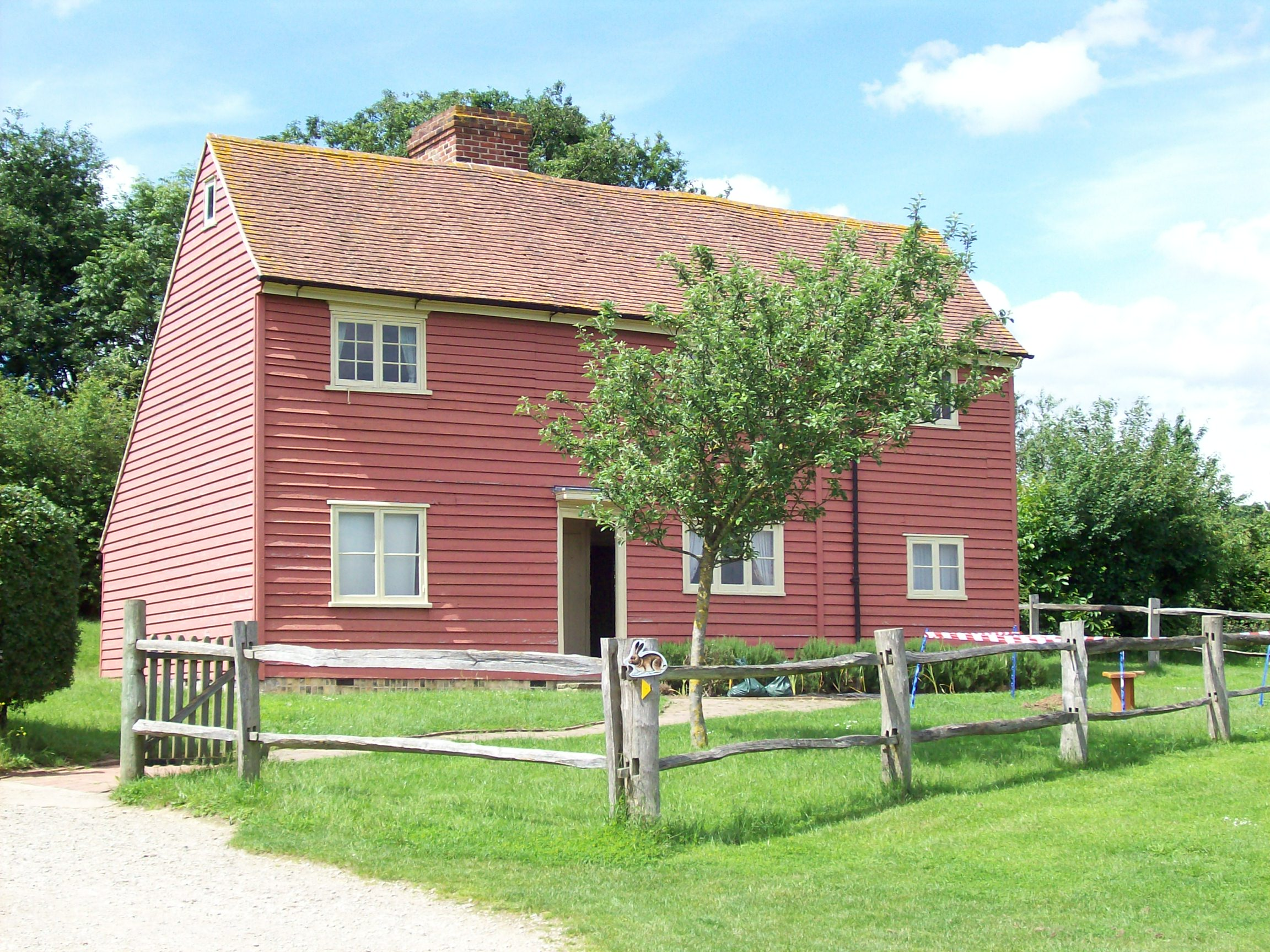
Petts Farmhouse

A late-eighteenth-century farmhouse. Petts Farmhouse is a Grade II* listed building.

=== Sandling Farmhouse ===
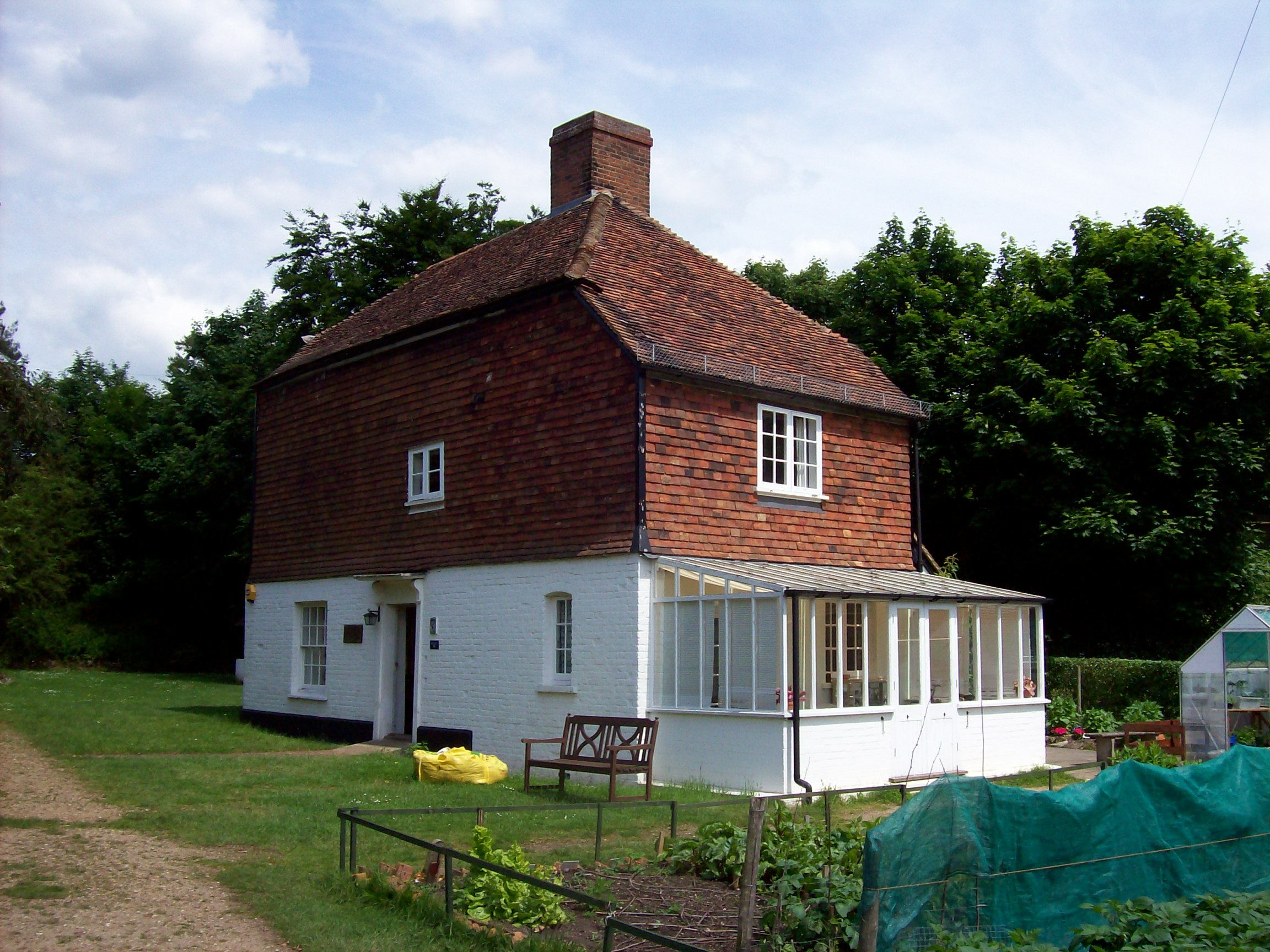
Sandling Farmhouse

Sandling farmhouse is one of the original farm buildings. It was the home of George Brundle, the last tenant of the farm until his death at 98 in 2001. The building dates to the sixteenth century, and has links to Sir Thomas Wyatt.

=== Forge ===
A blacksmith's forge has been recreated at the museum.

=== Granary ===
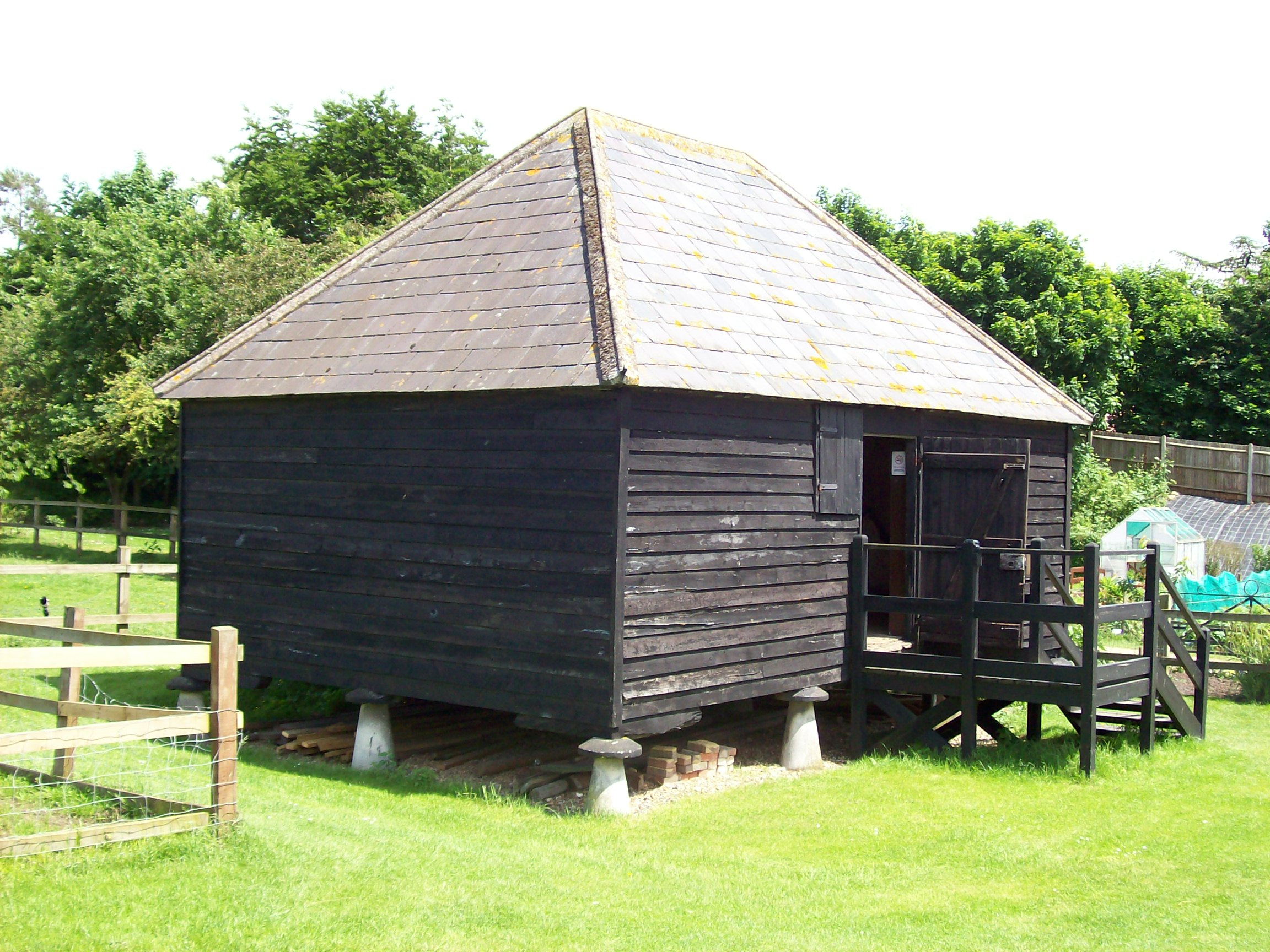
The granary

A nineteenth-century granary from Boxley Grange Farm, Boxley, was dismantled in March 1993 and has been re-erected at the museum.

=== Hopper Huts ===
A set of Hopper huts from North Frith Farm, Hadlow was dismantled and re-erected at the museum. These huts are built of brick, with internal fireplaces. A set of hopper huts with a wood frame clad in corrugated iron has been constructed, along with a cookhouse and privy.

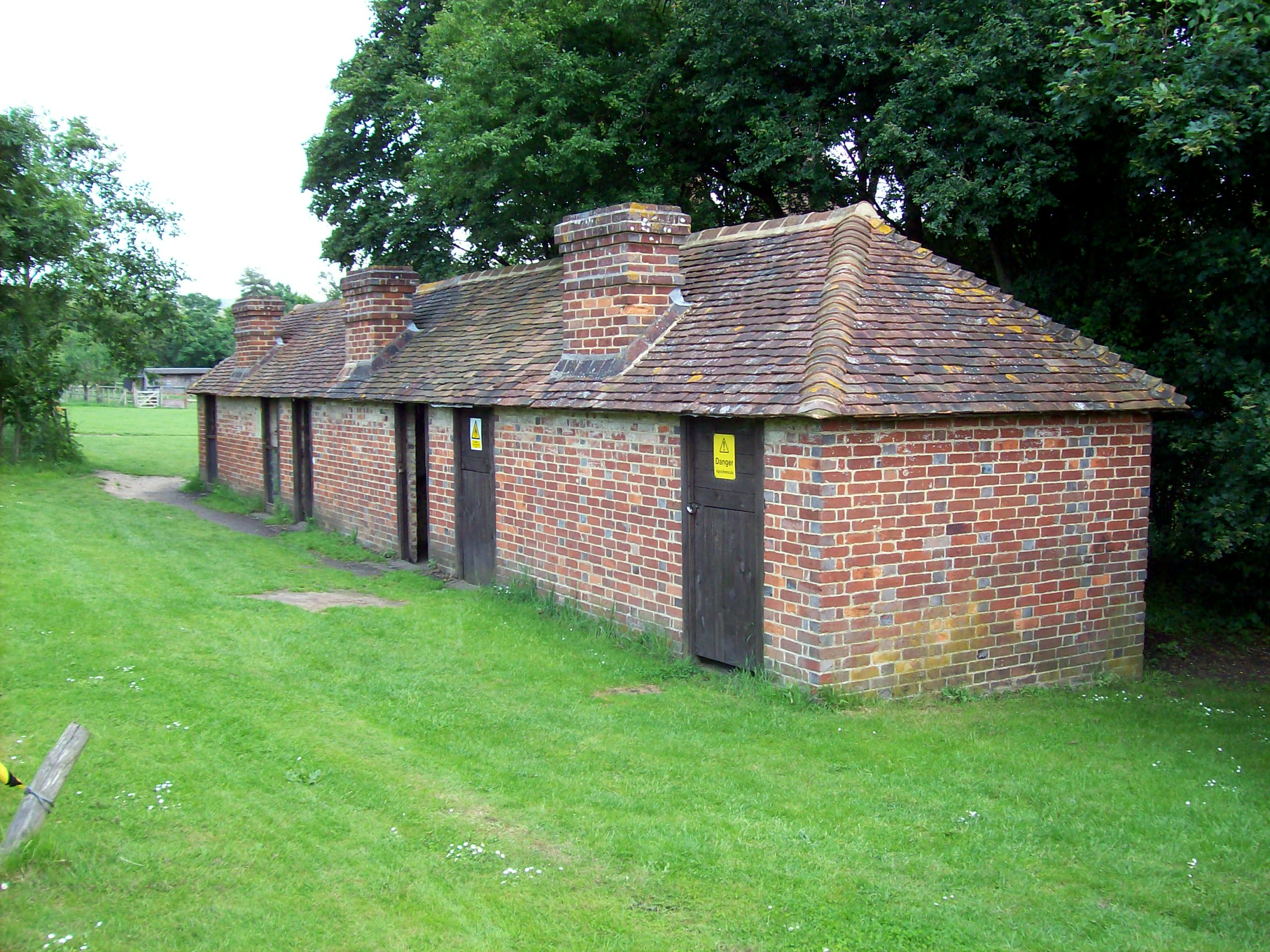
The rebuilt hopper huts from Hadlow

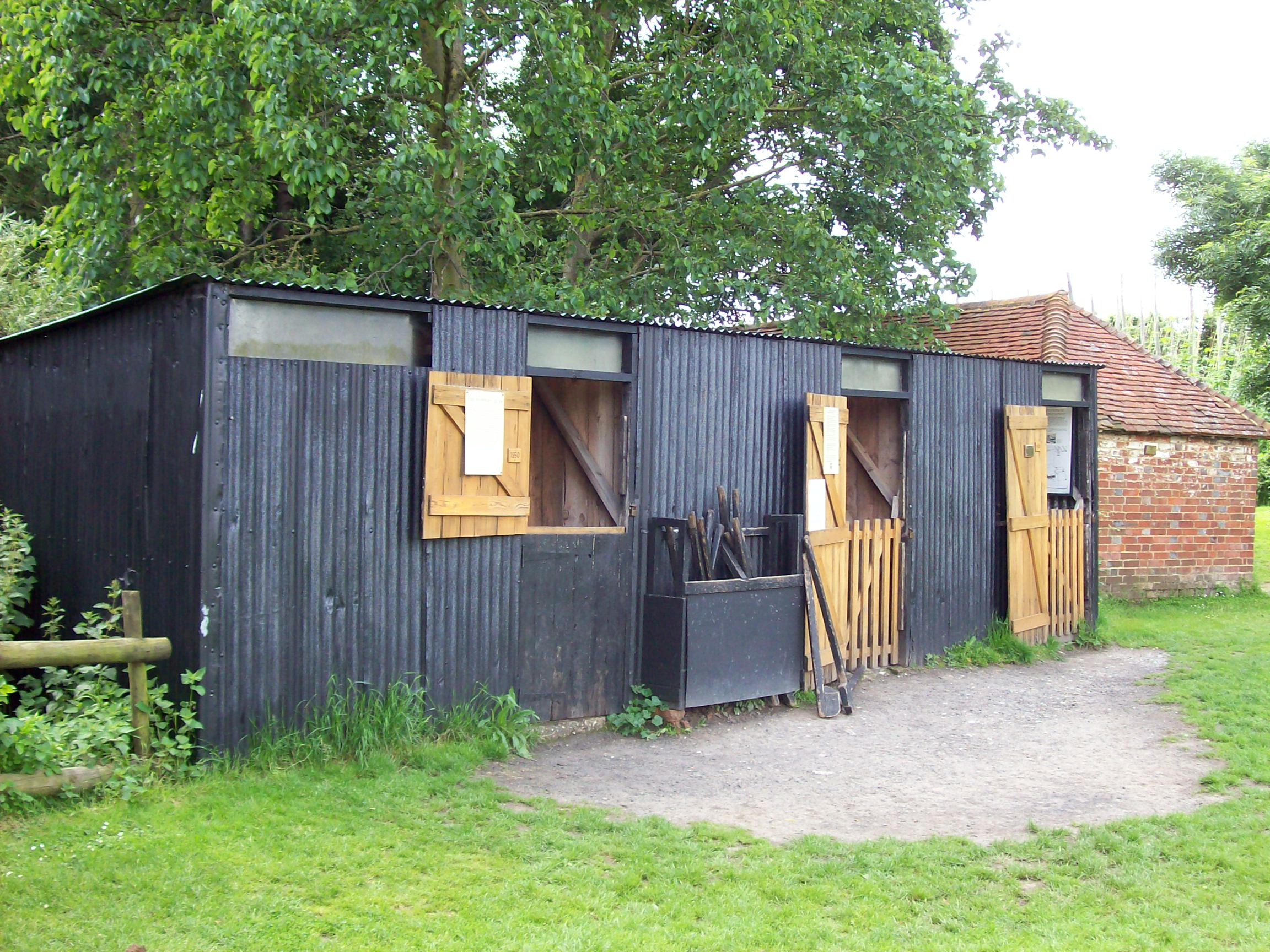
The reconstructed hopper huts

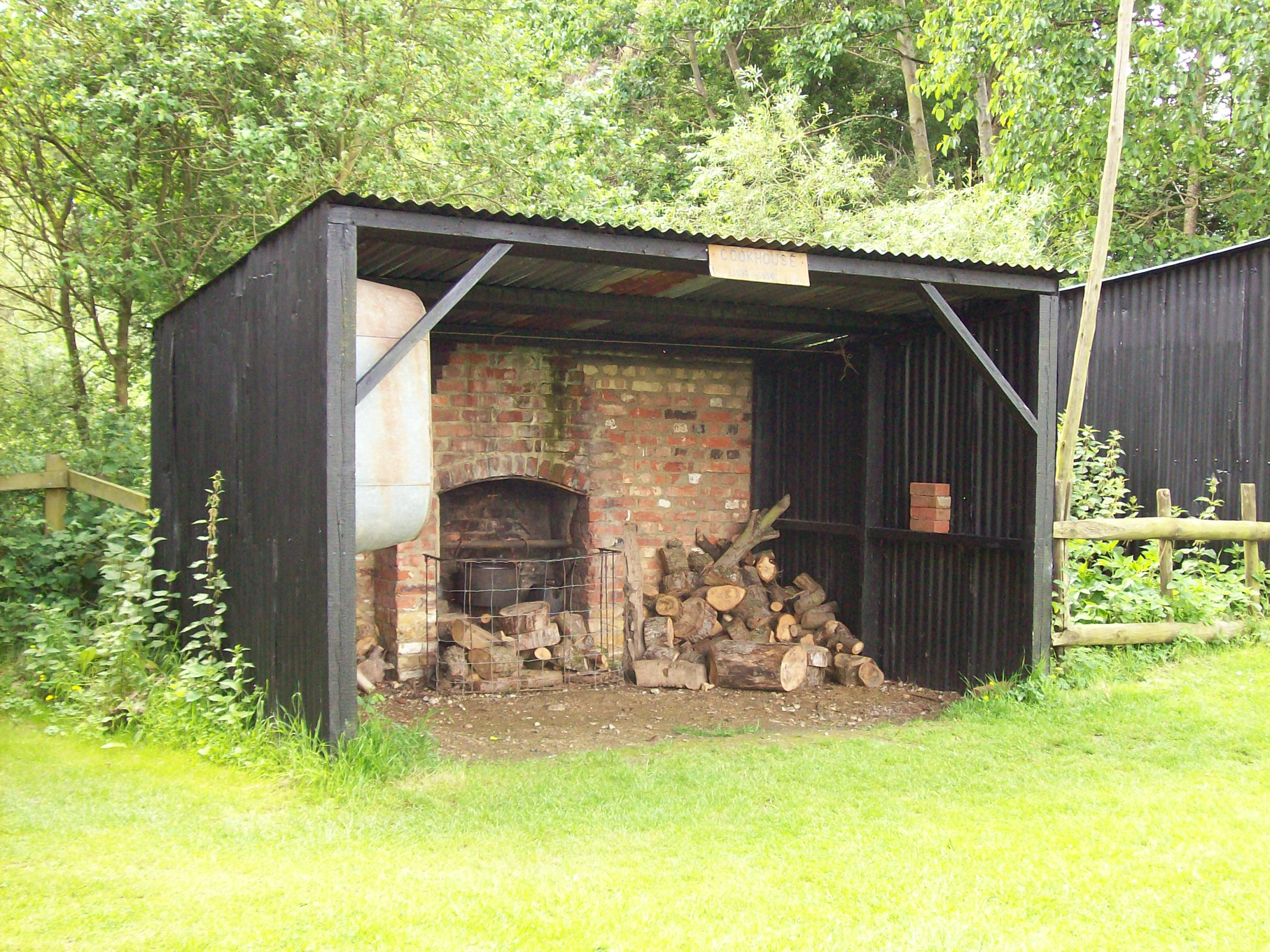
The reconstructed cookhouse

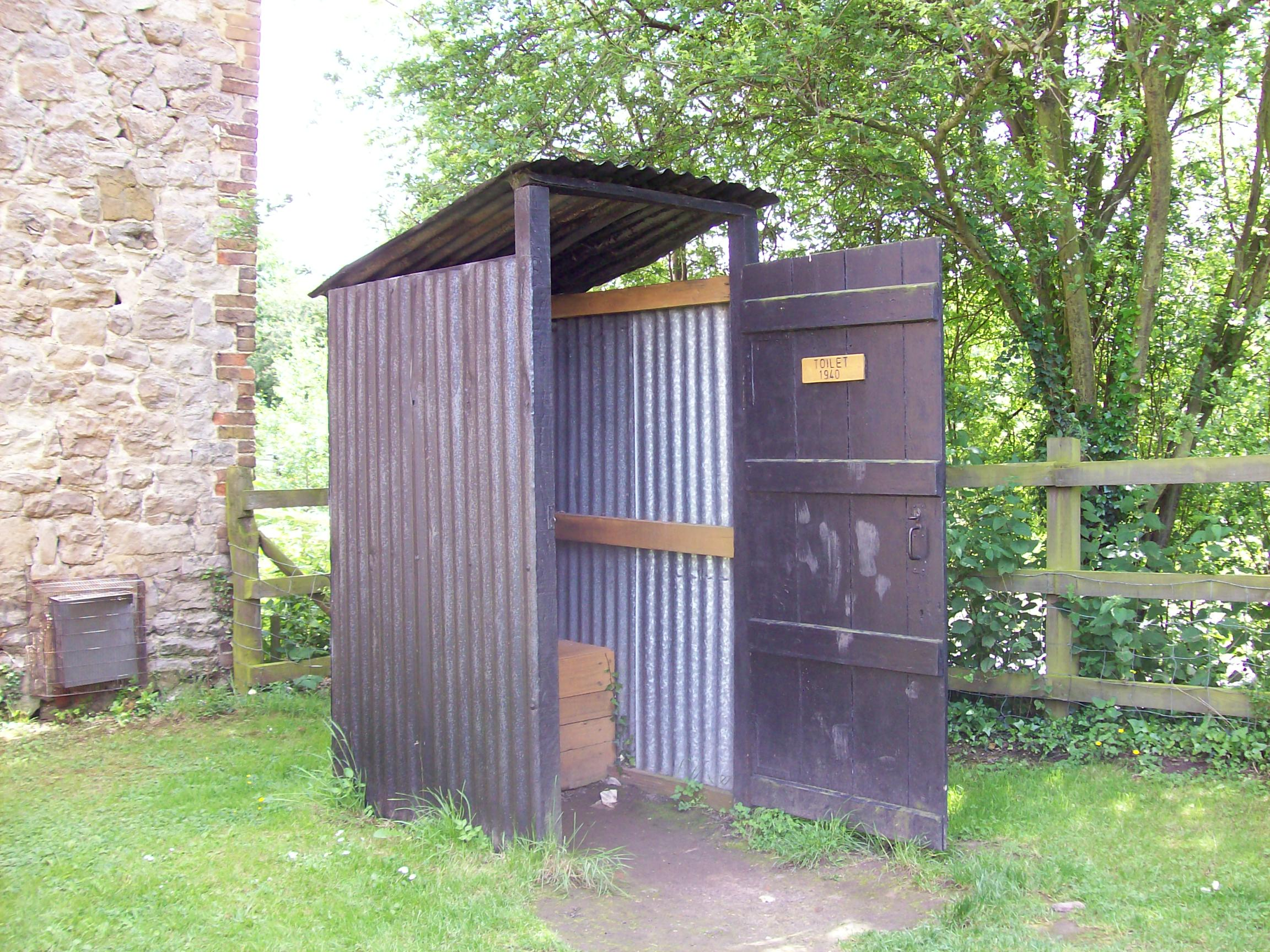
The privy

=== Oast ===
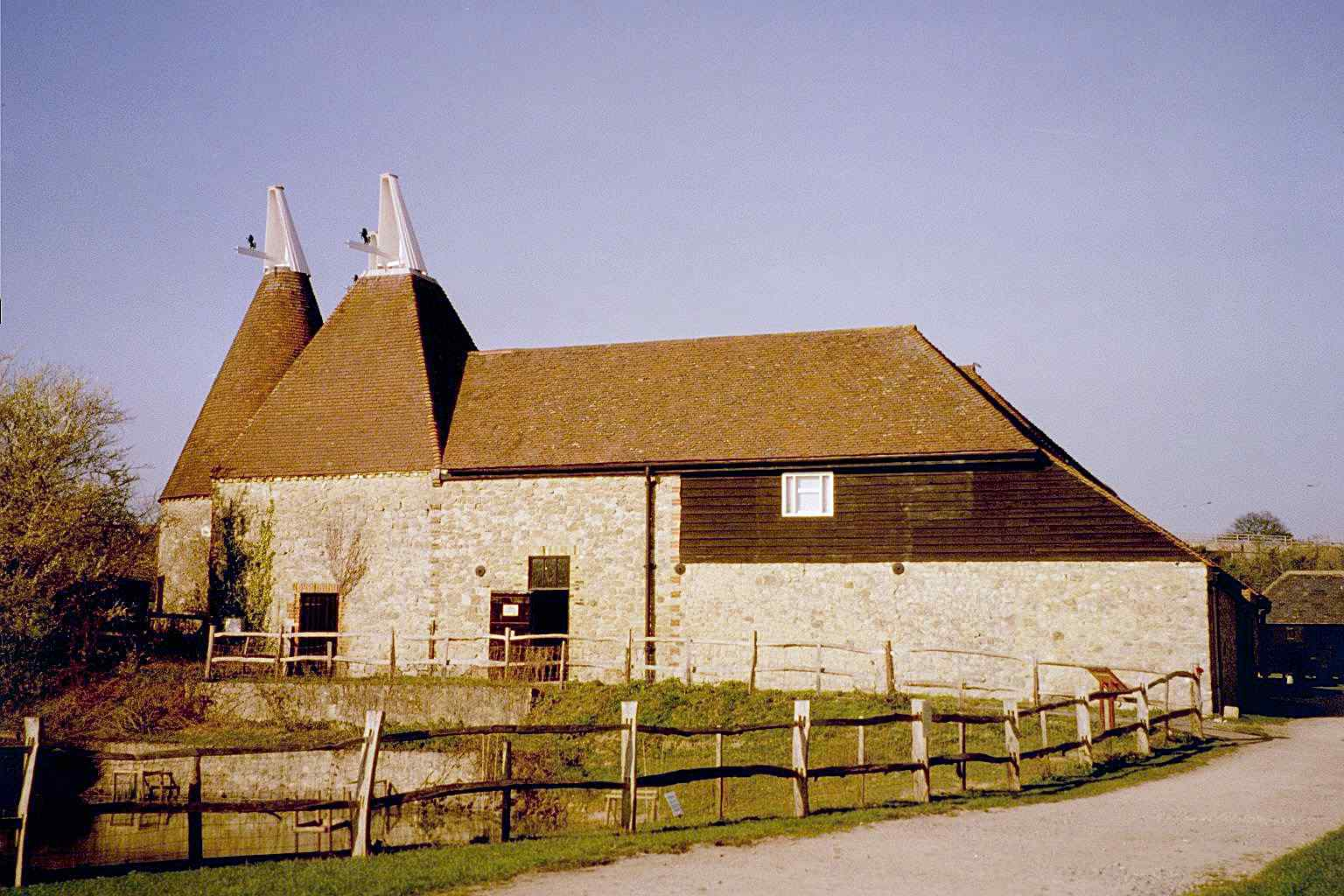
The restored oast, the fourth kiln is to the right of the square kiln

One of the original farm buildings. The oast originally had four kilns, two round and two square. Hops had last been dried here some time before 1925. The two square kilns were demolished in 1935 and the stowage was damaged in a fire in 1951. The oast was restored in 1984, both round kilns and one square kiln being restored with cowls. The oast houses a reconstruction of a village store, being the interior fittings of a general store in Hawkhurst.

=== Shepherd's Hut ===
A shepherd's hut from Acton Farm, Charing was presented to the museum in 1994.

=== Tack Room ===
A tack room has been recreated at the museum.

=== Tearooms ===
The tearooms are housed in one of the original farm houses.

=== Village Hall ===
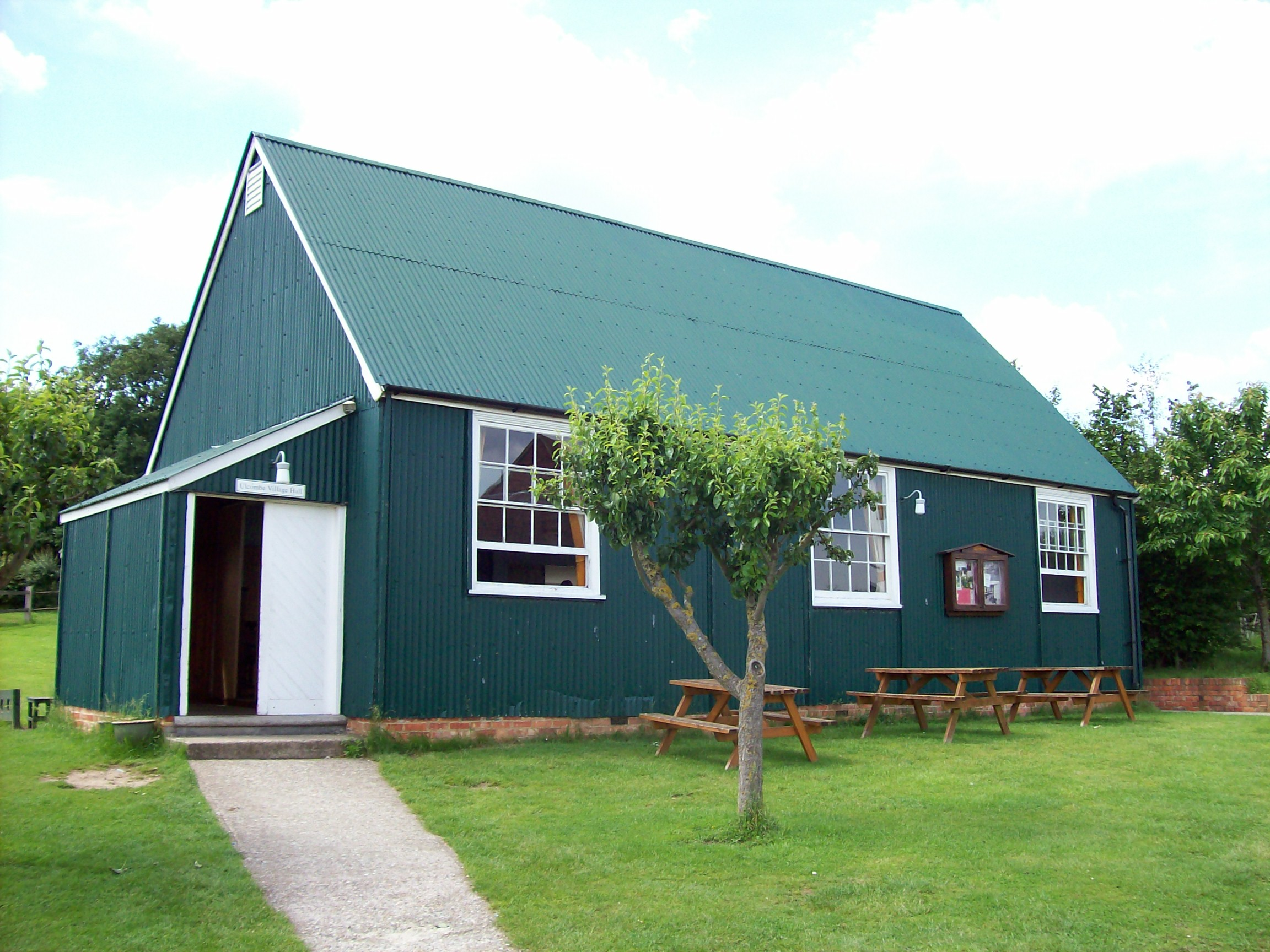
The Village Hall

Of similar construction to the chapel. The old village hall from Ulcombe was donated to the museum in 1997. It was dismantled in October 1997 and re-erected, opening to the public in June 2000.

=== Wagon Store ===
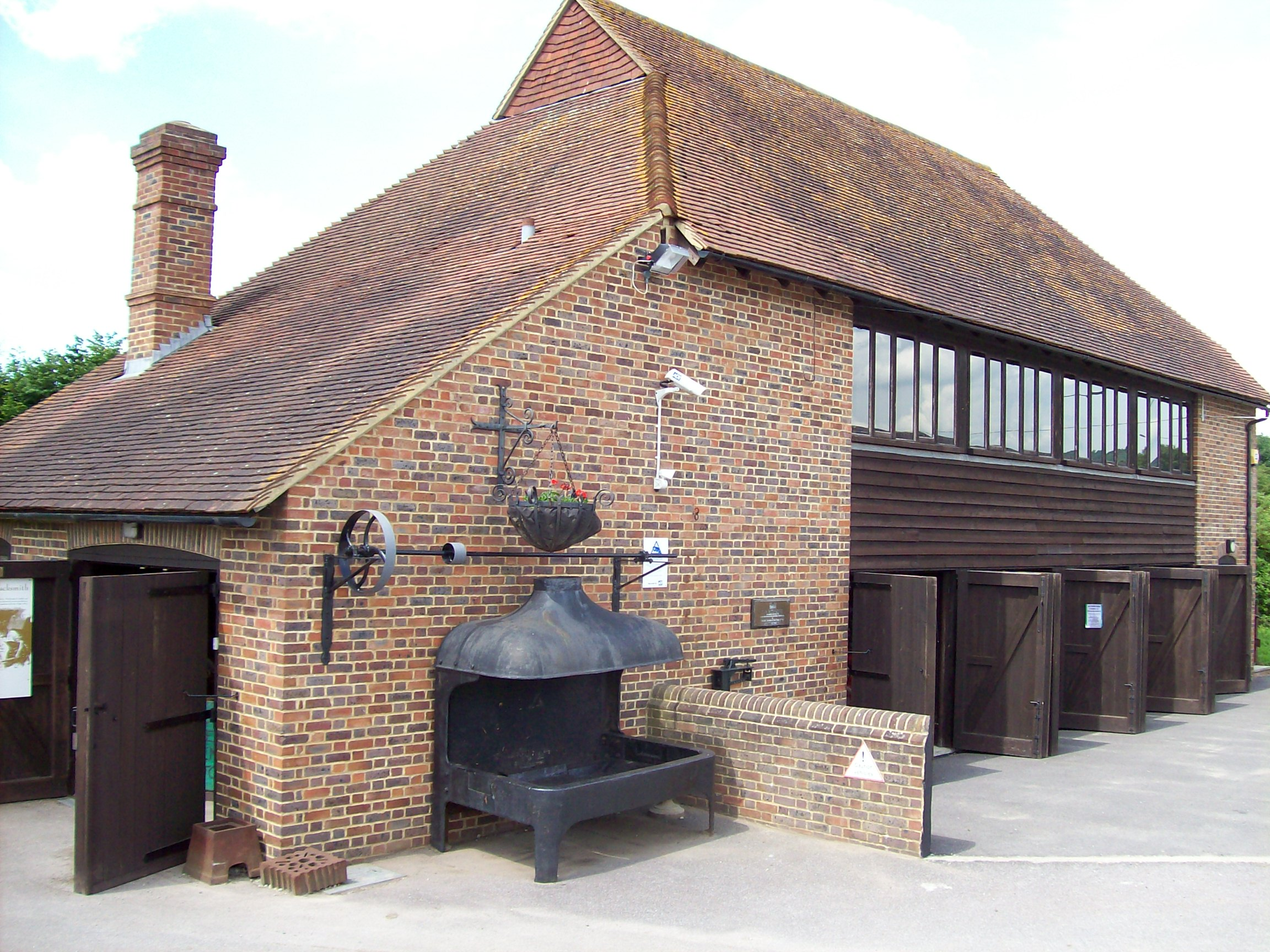
The Wagon Store and Forge

The wagon store building was purpose built at the museum in 1993. The re-created forge is at one end.

== Sources ==
- R & I Walton (1998). Kentish Oasts. Burnt Mill, Egerton: Christine Swift. ISBN 0-9506977-7-X.
