= Oast Theatre, Tonbridge =

Theatre in Kent, England

Oast Theatre
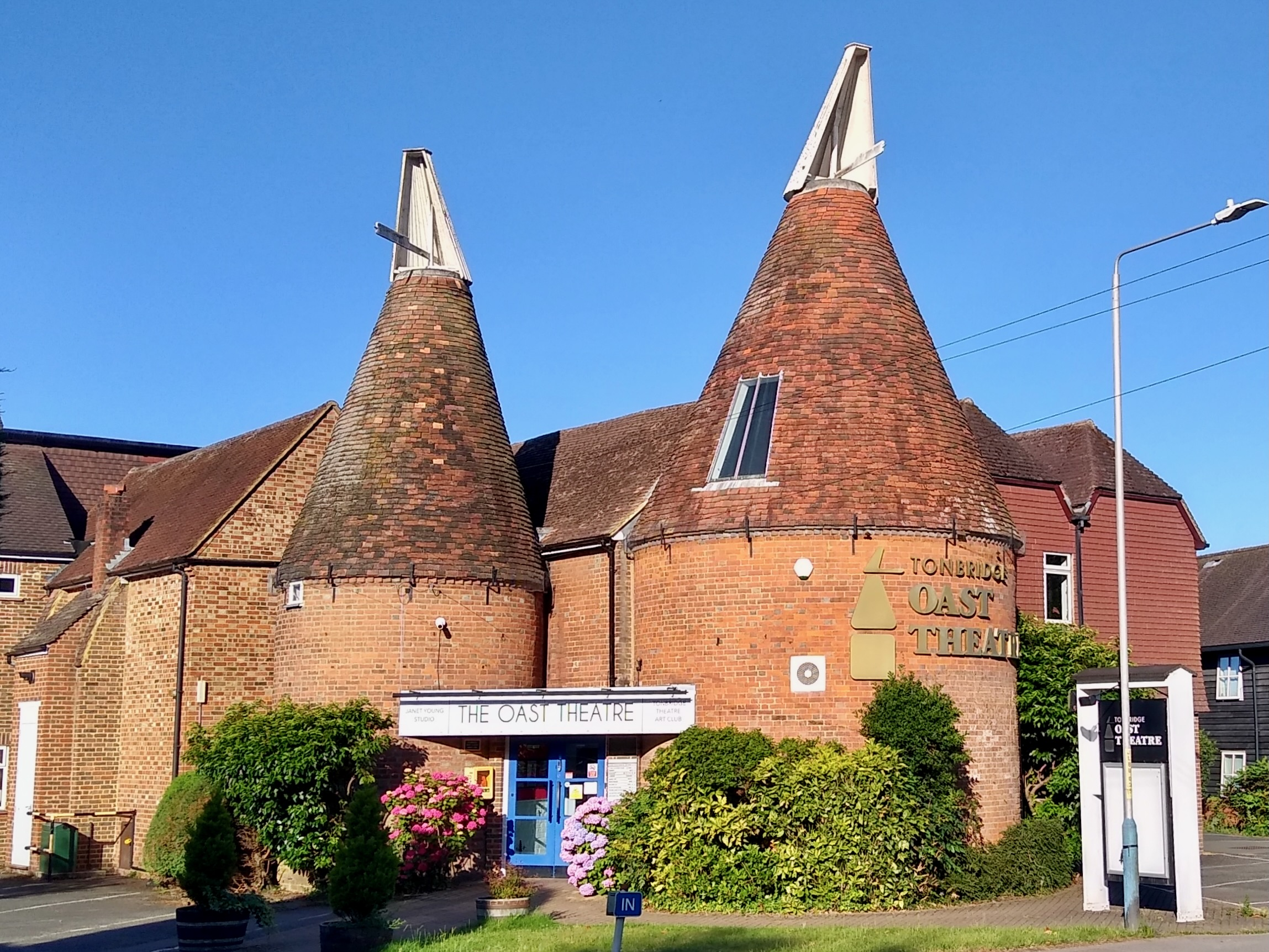
- The Oast Theatre in 2026

- The Oast Theatre, Tonbridge, in Kent
- Address: London Road; Tonbridge; England
- Coordinates: 51.2059°N 0.2623°E
- Owner: Tonbridge Theatre and Arts Club
- Capacity: 112
- Type: Provincial

Construction
- Opened: 1974
- Years active: 1974–present

Website
- www.oasttheatre.com

The Oast Theatre is situated on the outskirts of Tonbridge, Kent. It is a small theatre that is based in an old oast house. It is home to the Tonbridge Theatre and Arts Club. The theatre seats 112 people.

== History ==
Tonbridge Theatre and Arts Club (TTAC) was based at The Mitre PH, Hadlow Road, Tonbridge. In the late 1960s, it was apparent that the venue was too small and an alternative was sought. The search led to a disused oast house, which had been used to dry hops until 1966. The oast was purchased for £7,000 by a consortium of ten members of TTAC, who sold it on to TTAC for £6,000. The Oast Theatre was opened on 20 April 1974 by Lady Rupert Nevill. The opening production was an adaptation of Tom Jones. By 1978, TTAC had paid off all loans taken out to purchase and convert the oast.

In 1982, the Oast Theatre was awarded a Civic Design Award from Tonbridge Civic Society. The theatre is a registered charity, the Tonbridge Theatre and Arts Club. In 1988, an extension was built on the side of the oast. The adjoining barn was purchased and converted for use as storage and workshops. The extension was opened by Prince Edward, who attended a performance of Children of a Lesser God. A further extension in 1997 provided improved dressing room and additional storage facilities. The theatre can seat 112 people. In January 2010, the theatre was granted planning permission for an extension of an ancillary storage building. The planning application was supported by The Theatres Trust.

== Oast Youth Theatre ==
The Oast Theatre is home to the Oast Youth Theatre. Its members are between 14 and 18 years old. They produce three plays each year.

== Art ==
The Oast Theatre has its own art group, which meets weekly. The theatre hosts an annual art exhibition held in the Janet Young Room. The exhibition normally attracts about 50 artists and 150 exhibits.

== Sources ==
- Walton, Robin (1985). Oasts in Kent. Maidstone: Christine Swift. ISBN 0-9506977-3-7.
