= Oast house =

Building used for drying hops

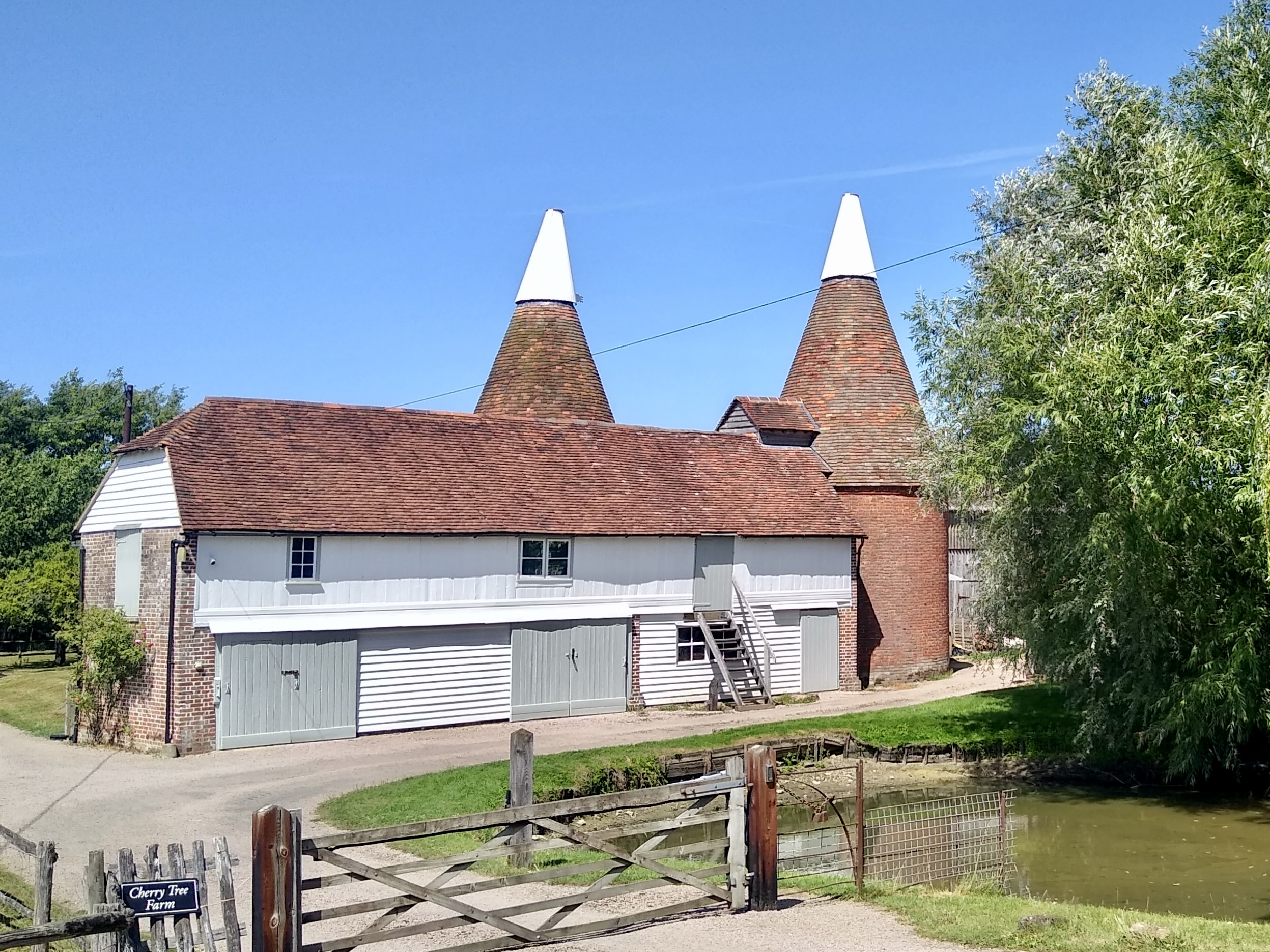
A traditional oast at Frittenden, Kent

An oast, oast house (or oasthouse) or hop kiln is a building designed for kilning (drying) hops as part of the brewing process. Oast houses can be found in most hop-growing (and former hop-growing) areas, and are often good examples of agricultural vernacular architecture. Many redundant oast houses have been converted into houses. The names "oast" and "oast house" are used interchangeably in Kent and Sussex, but in Surrey, Hampshire, Herefordshire and Worcestershire they are called "hop kilns".

An oast house consists of a rectangular one- or two-storey building (the "stowage") and one or more kilns in which the hops were spread out to be dried by hot air rising from a wood or charcoal fire below. The drying floors were thin and perforated to permit the heat to pass through and escape through a cowl in the roof which turned with the wind. The freshly picked hops from the fields were raked in to dry and then raked out to cool before being bagged up and sent to the brewery. The Kentish dialect word kell was sometimes used for kilns ("The oast has three kells") and sometimes to mean the oast itself ("Take this lunchbox to your father, he's working in the kell"). The word oast itself also means "kiln".

The earliest surviving oast house is at Golford, Cranbrook near Tunbridge Wells. It dates from some time in the 17th century and closely mirrors the first documentary evidence on oasts soon after the introduction of hops into England in the mid-16th century. Early oast houses were simply adapted barns, but by the 18th century the distinctive tall buildings with conical roofs had been developed to increase the draught. At first, these were square, but around 1800 roundel kilns were developed in the belief that they were more efficient. Square kilns remained more popular in Herefordshire and Worcestershire and came back into fashion in the southeast in the later 19th century. In the 1930s, the cowls were replaced by louvred openings as electric fans and diesel oil ovens were employed.

Nowadays hops are dried industrially and the many oast houses on farms have now been converted into dwellings. One of the best-preserved oast house complexes is at the Hop Farm Country Park at Beltring.

== Hop drying ==
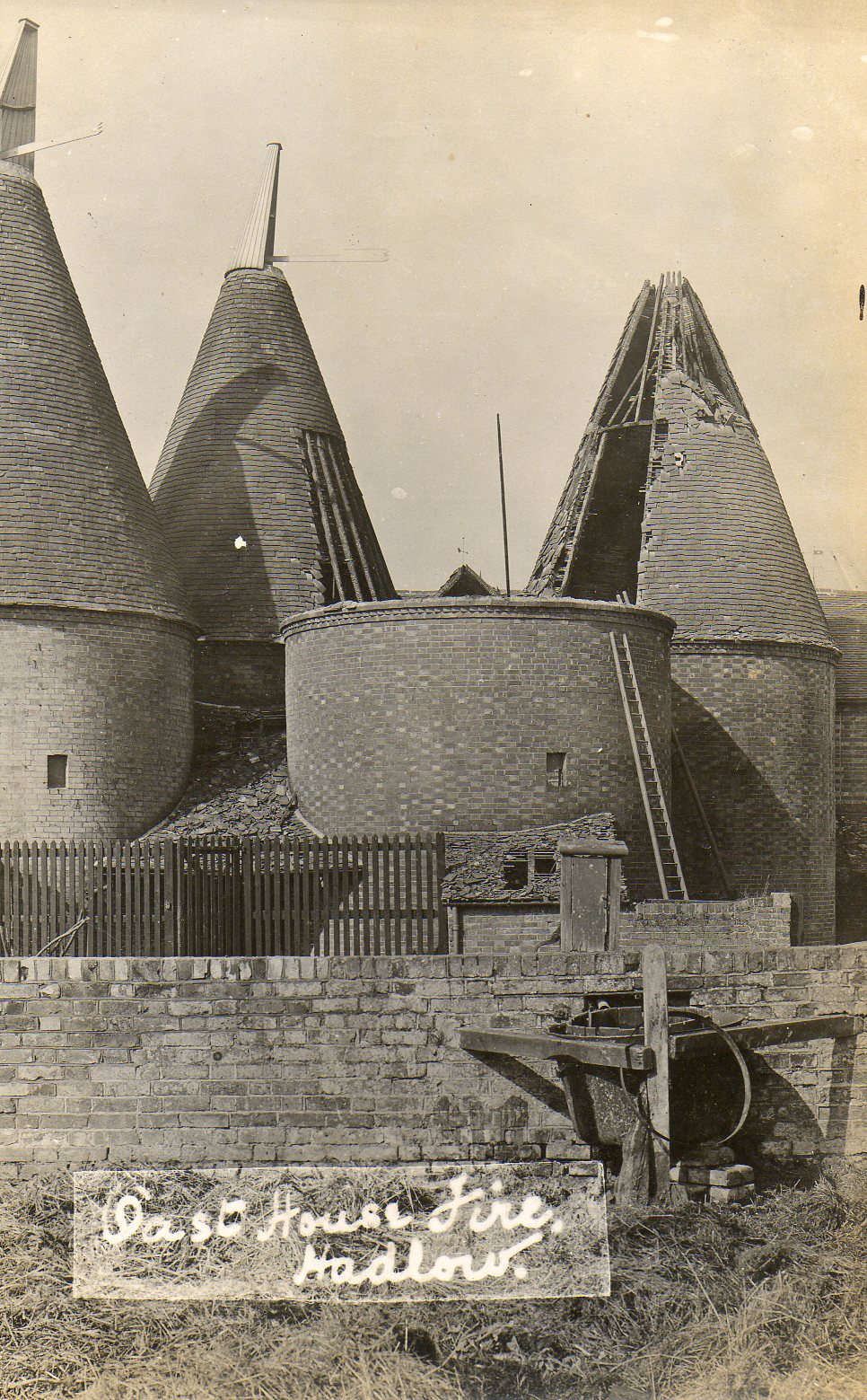
Castle Farm, Hadlow, Kent, showing fire damage

The purpose of an oast is to dry hops. This is achieved by the use of a flow of heated air through the kiln, rather than a firing process.

Hops were picked in the hop gardens by gangs of pickers, who worked on a piece work basis and earned a fixed rate per bushel. The green hops were put into large hessian sacks called pokes (in Kent) or green sacks (West Midlands). These would be taken to the oast and brought into the stowage at first floor level. Some oasts had a man-powered hoist for this purpose, consisting of a pulley of some 5 feet (1.52 m) diameter on an axle to which a rope or chain was attached.

The green hops when freshly picked had a moisture content of approximately 80%. This needed to be reduced to 6%, although the moisture content would subsequently rise to 10% during storage.

The green hops were spread out in the kilns. The floors were generally of 1 1/4-inch (32 mm) square battens nailed at right angles across the joists, placed so that there was a similar gap between each batten, and covered with a horsehair cloth. The hops would be spread some 12 inches (300 mm) deep, the kiln doors closed and the furnace lit. When the hops were judged to be dried, the furnace would be extinguished and the hops removed from the kiln using a scuppet, which was a large wooden framed shovel with a hessian base. The hops would be spread out on the stowage floor to cool, and would then be pressed into large jute sacks called pockets with a hop press. Each pocket contained the produce of about 150 imperial bushels (5,500 L) of green hops. It weighed a hundredweight and a quarter (140 pounds (64 kg)) and was marked with the grower's details, this being required under The Hop (Prevention of Fraud) Act, 1866.

The pockets were then sent to market, where the brewers would buy them and use the dried hops in the beer-making process to add flavour and act as a preservative.

Oasts sometimes caught fire, the damage sometimes being confined to the kilns (Castle Farm, Hadlow), or sometimes leading to the complete destruction of the oast (Stilstead Farm, East Peckham in September 1983, and Parsonage Farm, Bekesbourne in August 1996).

== Early oasts ==
The earliest description of an oast dates from 1574. It was a small building of 18 feet (5.49 m) by 9 feet (2.74 m) in plan, with walls 9 feet (2.74 m) high. The central furnace was some 6 feet (1.83 m) long, 2 feet 6 inches (760 mm) high and 13 inches (330 mm) internal width. The upper floor was the drying floor, and only some 5 feet (1.52 m) above the ground floor, hops being laid directly on the slatted floor rather than being laid on hessian cloth as was the later practice.

=== Conversions to oasts ===
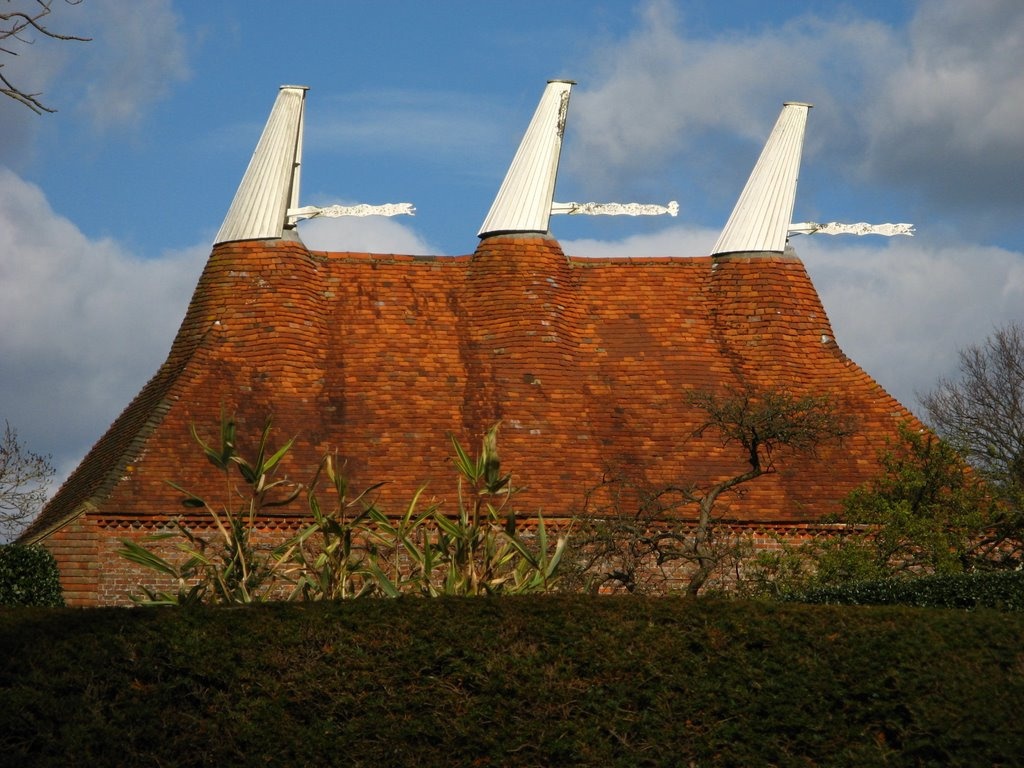
Oast house at Great Dixter, East Sussex

In many cases, early oasts were adapted from barns or cottages. In 1779, St. Peter's Chapel, Frindsbury was converted to an oast. A chapel at Horton, near Canterbury was also converted. Part of Hastings Priory was serving as an oast in 1823. The gatehouse to the Bishop's Palace, Bosbury, Herefordshire was also converted.

This was done by building a kiln within the building, dividing it into three, the upper floor being used to receive the "green" hops, dry them and press the dried hops. Examples of this type of conversion can be seen at Catt's place, Paddock Wood, and Great Dixter, Northiam.

Later conversions of barns and cottages would be by either building an integral kiln within one end of the building, as seen at Biddenden, Kent, or by adding kilns externally to the existing building, as seen at Barnhill Farm, Hunton, and also at Sutton Valence, or both, as seen at Ightham Mote.

=== Purpose-built (custom) oasts ===
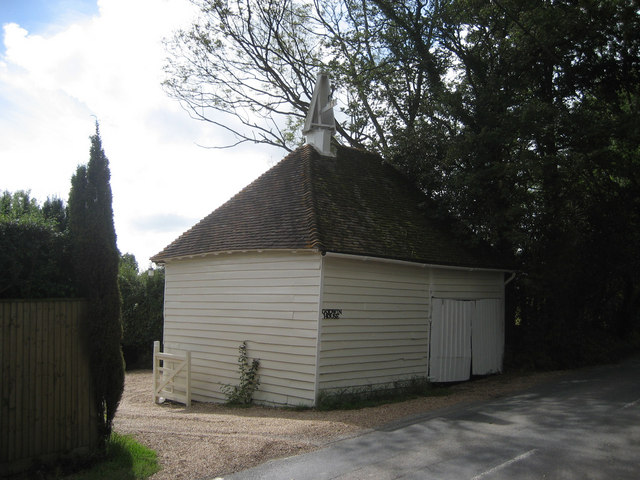
Golford oast

An agreement for the building of an oast in Flimwell in East Sussex in 1667 gave the size of the building as 30 by 15 feet (9.1 by 4.6 m) and another to be built there was to be built in 1671 being 32 by 16 feet (9.8 by 4.9 m) or 17 feet (5.2 m), having two kilns. The earliest surviving purpose-built oast is at Golford, Cranbrook, built in 1750. This small timber framed oast is 21 by 15 feet (6.4 by 4.6 m) in plan, and has a hipped tiled roof. It has one kiln, and a single cowl on the ridge of the roof.

== Traditional oasts ==
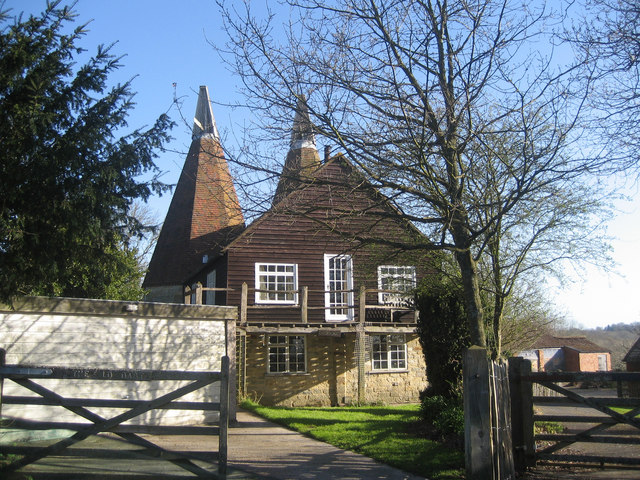
Oast with octagonal kilns, now house-converted

In the early 19th century, the traditional oast as we now know it started to be built. A two- or three-storey stowage, with between one and eight circular kilns. Kiln sizes generally ranged from 12 feet (3.66 m) to 18 feet (5.49 m) diameter, with a conical roof. Towards the end of the 19th century, square kilns were constructed. These generally ranged in size from 16 feet (4.88 m) to 20 feet (6.10 m) square. An oast at Hawkhurst was built with two octagonal kilns, 15 feet (4.57 m) across the flats.

== Modern oasts ==
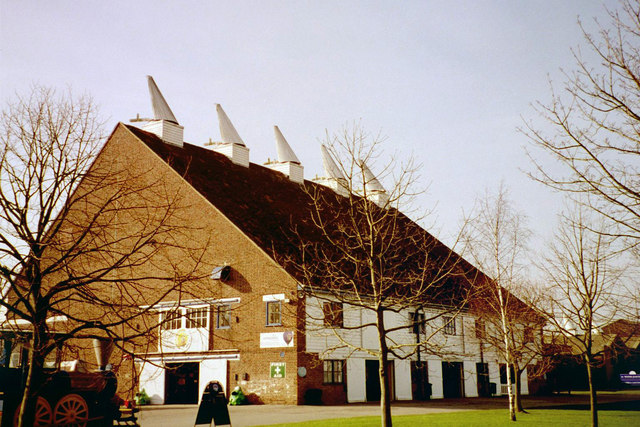
Bell 5, Beltring, built 1935

In the 20th century, oasts reverted to the original form with internal kilns and cowls in the ridge of the roof (Bell 5, Beltring). These oasts were much larger and constructed of modern materials. Oasts were built as late as 1948 (Upper Fowle Hall, Paddock Wood), or 1950 (Hook Green, Lamberhurst).

Very modern oasts bear little resemblance to traditional oasts. These vast buildings can process hops from several farms, as at Norton near Teynham in Kent, built in 1982.

== Construction ==
=== South East ===
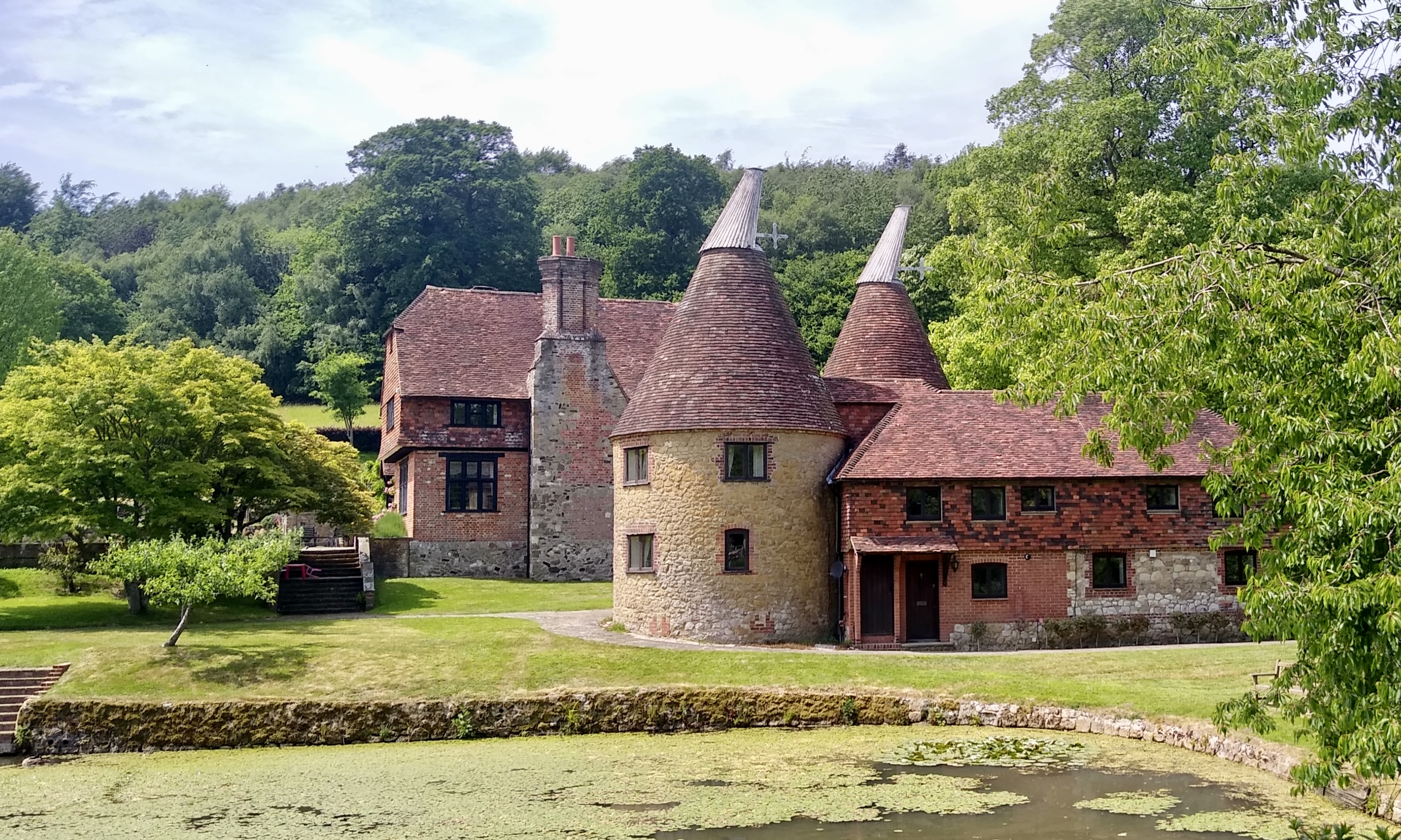
Oast at French Street, Westerham, Kent

Oasts were built of various materials, including bricks, timber, ragstone, and sandstone. Cladding could be timber weatherboards, corrugated iron or asbestos sheet.

Stowage

Many oasts were timber-framed buildings, although some were built entirely in brick, or ragstone if this was available locally. Some oasts were entirely brick except the front and floors, which were timber.

Kilns

Internal kilns were built of timber or bricks. External kilns were built from bricks, ragstone and bricks, flint, or sandstone. A rare material usage was at Tilden Farm, Headcorn where the kiln was built from Bethersden Marble. During the Second World War, a few kilns were built with a basic timber framing and clad in corrugated iron (Crittenden Farm, Matfield).

Kiln roofs

Kiln roofs, where the kiln was external, were generally built of a timber frame and covered in either peg tiles or slate. Some oasts had conical kiln roofs built of brick, these were covered in tar or pitch to keep them weatherproof. A few oasts had square kilns with brick roofs, again covered in tar or pitch. The top of the roof was open, and carried a cowl or louvred vent.

=== West Midlands ===
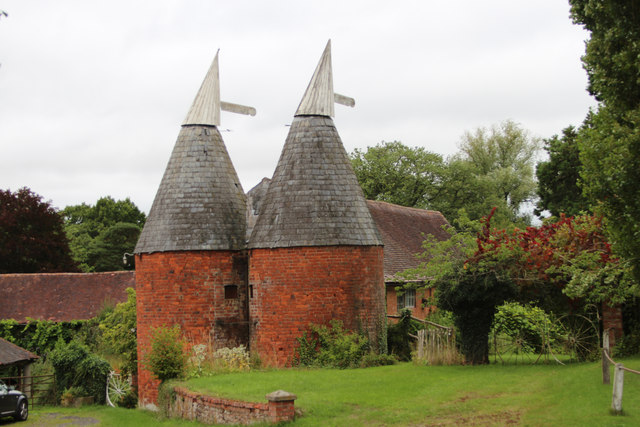
In Mathon, Herefordshire

Oasts were generally built of bricks or local stone.

Stowage

Bricks were the usual material for building the stowage, wood only being used in floors. Stone was sometimes used too (Madley). Some oasts had a cider mill on the ground floor of the stowage (Little Cowarne Court, Little Cowarne).

Kilns

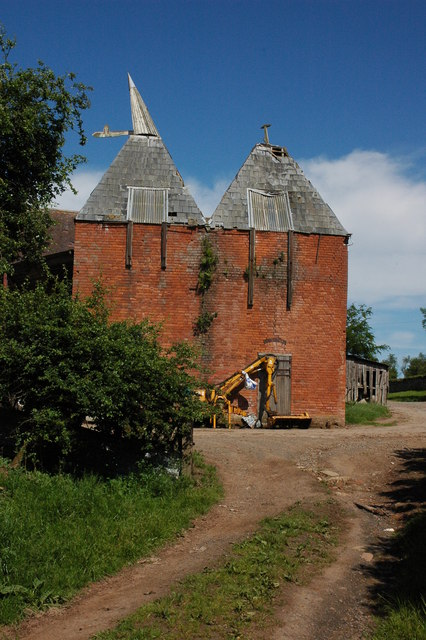
Oast at Munderfield, Herefordshire

Bricks were the usual material for building kilns. Stone was also used.

Kiln roofs

Kiln roofs could be of timber, clad in tiles or slate, or bricks. Brick kiln roofs could be tarred (Little Cowarne Court, Bromyard) or left bare (The Farm, Brockhampton). The roofs would be topped with a cowl (Upper Lyde Farm, Pipe and Lyde), or a ridge ventilator (Kidley, Acton Beauchamp).

== Locations ==
Oasts can be found in the UK and abroad.

=== South East England ===
Oasts are generally associated with Kent, and the oasthouse is a symbol associated with the county. They are also found in Sussex, Surrey and Hampshire.

=== West Midlands ===
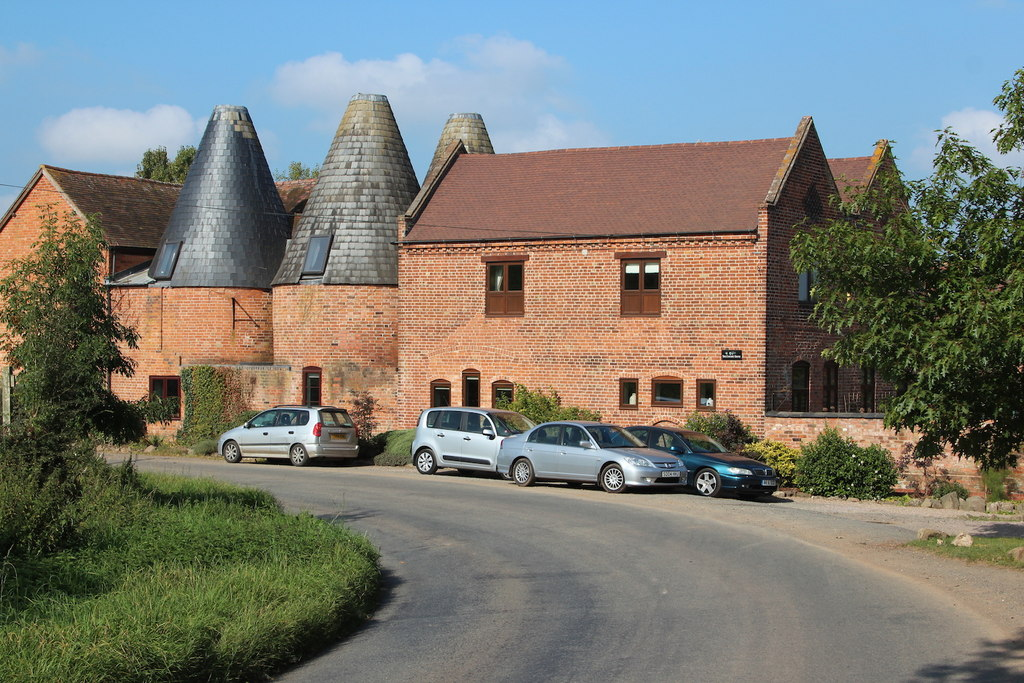
Oast house near Malvern, Worcestershire

In the West Midlands, the main hop-growing areas are Worcestershire, Herefordshire and Gloucestershire. In Worcestershire and Herefordshire oast houses were known as oast houses. In the 19th century Hereford and Worcester produced around 20% of English hops and at the turn of the 20th and 21st centuries it was producing 50%.

=== Europe ===
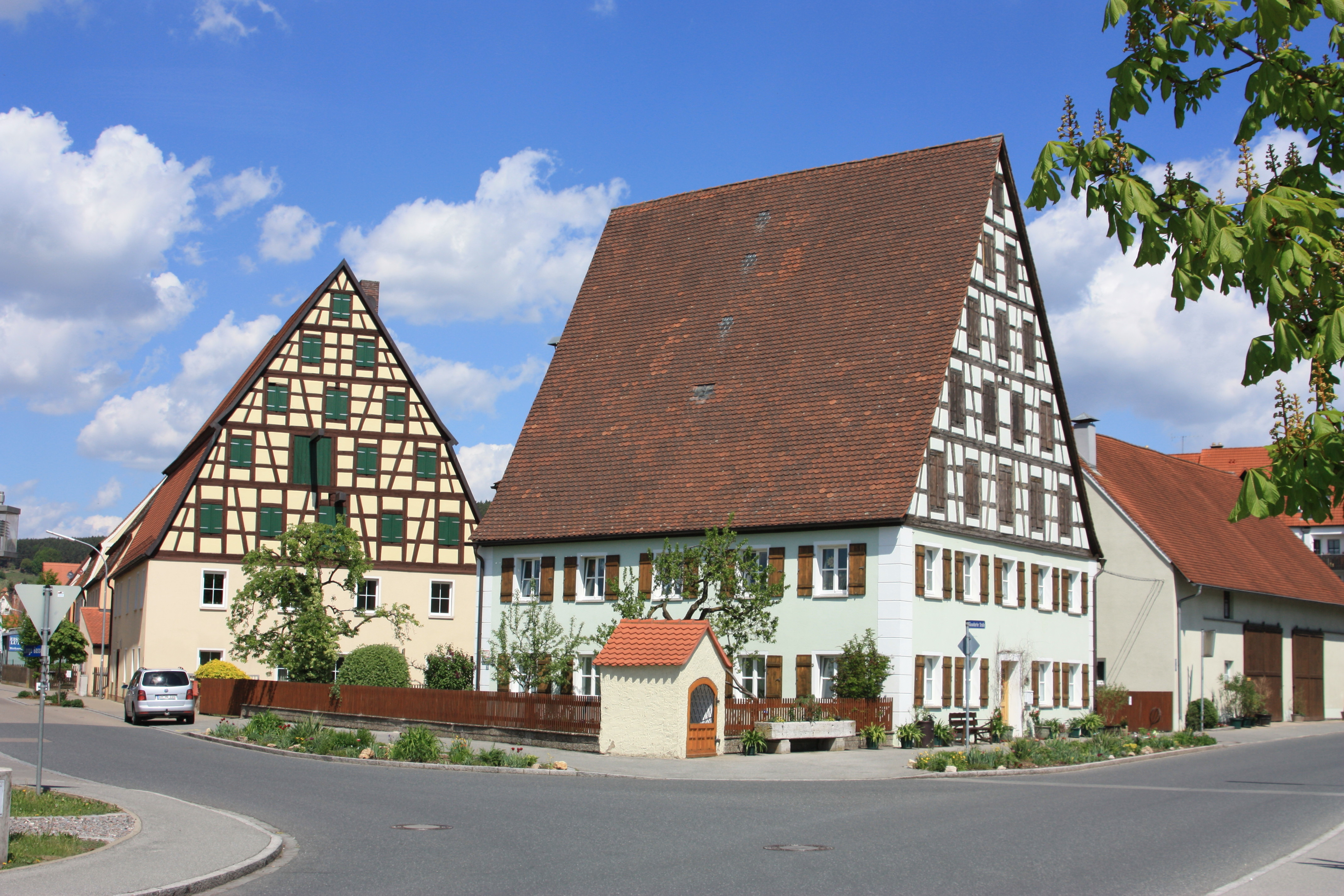
This building in Spalt, Germany was used for drying hops.

In Belgium, the main hop-growing area is around Poperinge and Ypres, West Flanders. Hops are also grown across the border in Nord, France. Hops are also grown around Aelst, north west of Brussels. Apart from Nord, the main hop growing area in France is around Haguenau, Bas-Rhin and around Dijon and Bèze, Côte-d'Or.

In Germany, hops are grown around Tettnang, Baden-Württemberg; around Hallertau, Hersbruck, Illschwang and Spalt, Bavaria. In the Czech Republic hops are grown around Roudnice, Hradec Králové Region and around Úštěk and Žatec, Ústí nad Labem Region. They are also grown around Olomouc, Olomouc Region. In Slovakia, hops are grown around Trenčín, Trenčín Region. Hops are also grown in Poland and Russia.

=== Australia ===
See also John Terry

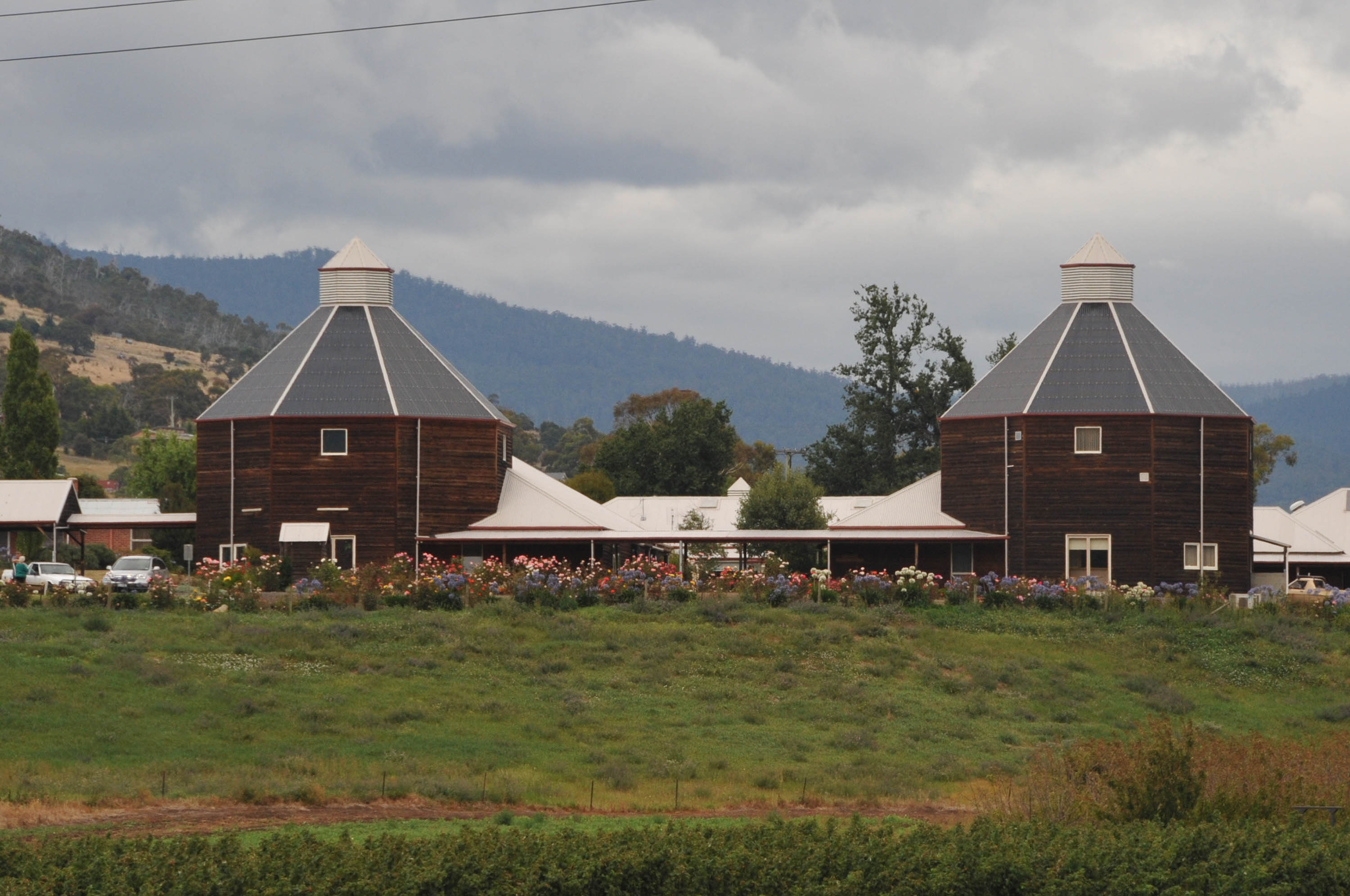
Oast houses in New Norfolk, Tasmania

Oast houses are often called hop kilns in Australia. Tasmania is a major hop-growing area, as were parts of Victoria. During the 19th century, some of the Kentish hop growers emigrated, and took hops with them. Initially, Tasmanian oasts were converted from existing buildings (New Norfolk, Ranelagh) but later purpose-built oasts were built (Valley Field, Bushy Park). These oasts had louvred ventilators instead of a cowl. The New Norfolk oast was converted from a watermill and is now a museum. Another location that has oasts was Tyenna. A modern oast of 400 by 200 feet (120 by 60 m) was built at Bushy Park in 1982.

== Conversion ==
With the increasing mechanisation of the hop-picking process, many oasts fell into disuse. Some were demolished and others became derelict. Increasing demand for housing has led to many oasts being converted into houses. Local councils nowadays are generally much stricter on the aesthetics of the conversions than was the case before the planning law came into being. Often kiln roofs have to be rebuilt, and cowls provided on converted oasts.

The earliest example of an oast being converted to a house is Millar's Farm oast, Meopham, which was house-converted in 1903 by Sir Philip Waterlow.

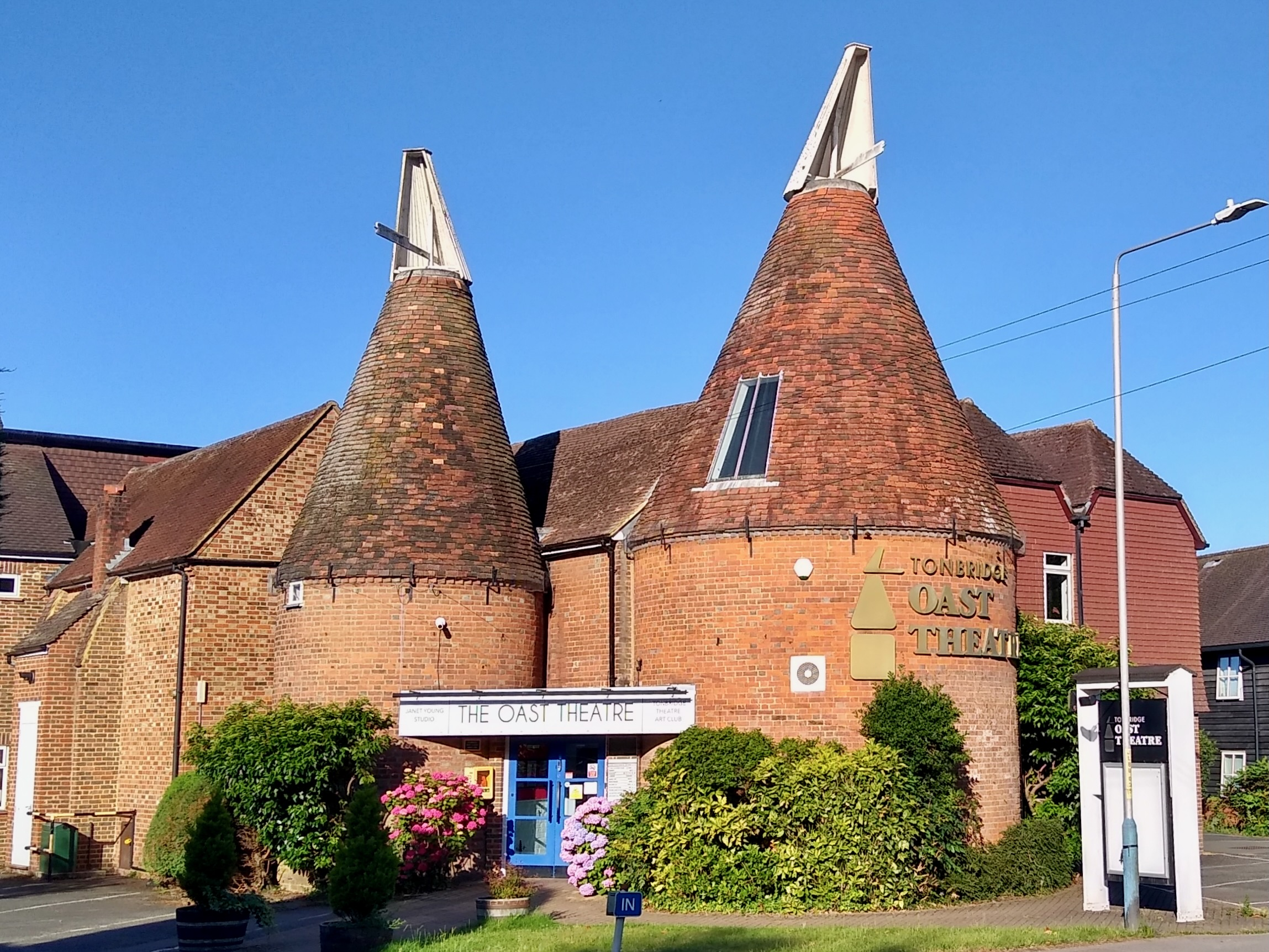
Oast Theatre, Tonbridge

Other conversions of oasts for non-residential purposes include a theatre (Oast Theatre, Tonbridge, and The Oasthouse Theatre, Rainham), a Youth Hostel (Capstone Farm, Chatham, another at Lady Margaret Manor, Doddington – now a residential centre for people with learning difficulties), a school (Sturry), a bakery (Chartham), a visitor centre (Bough Beech Reservoir), offices (Tatlingbury Farm, Five Oak Green), and a museum (Kent Museum of Rural Life, Sandling, Preston Street, Faversham, Wye College, Wye, and the former Whitbread Hop Farm at Beltring).

The National Trust owns an oast at Outridge, near Brasted Chart, which has very rare octagonal cowls, one at Castle Farm, Sissinghurst, converted to tea rooms, and another at Batemans, Burwash which has been converted to a shop, with the cowl being replaced by a dovecot.

=== Fake oasts ===
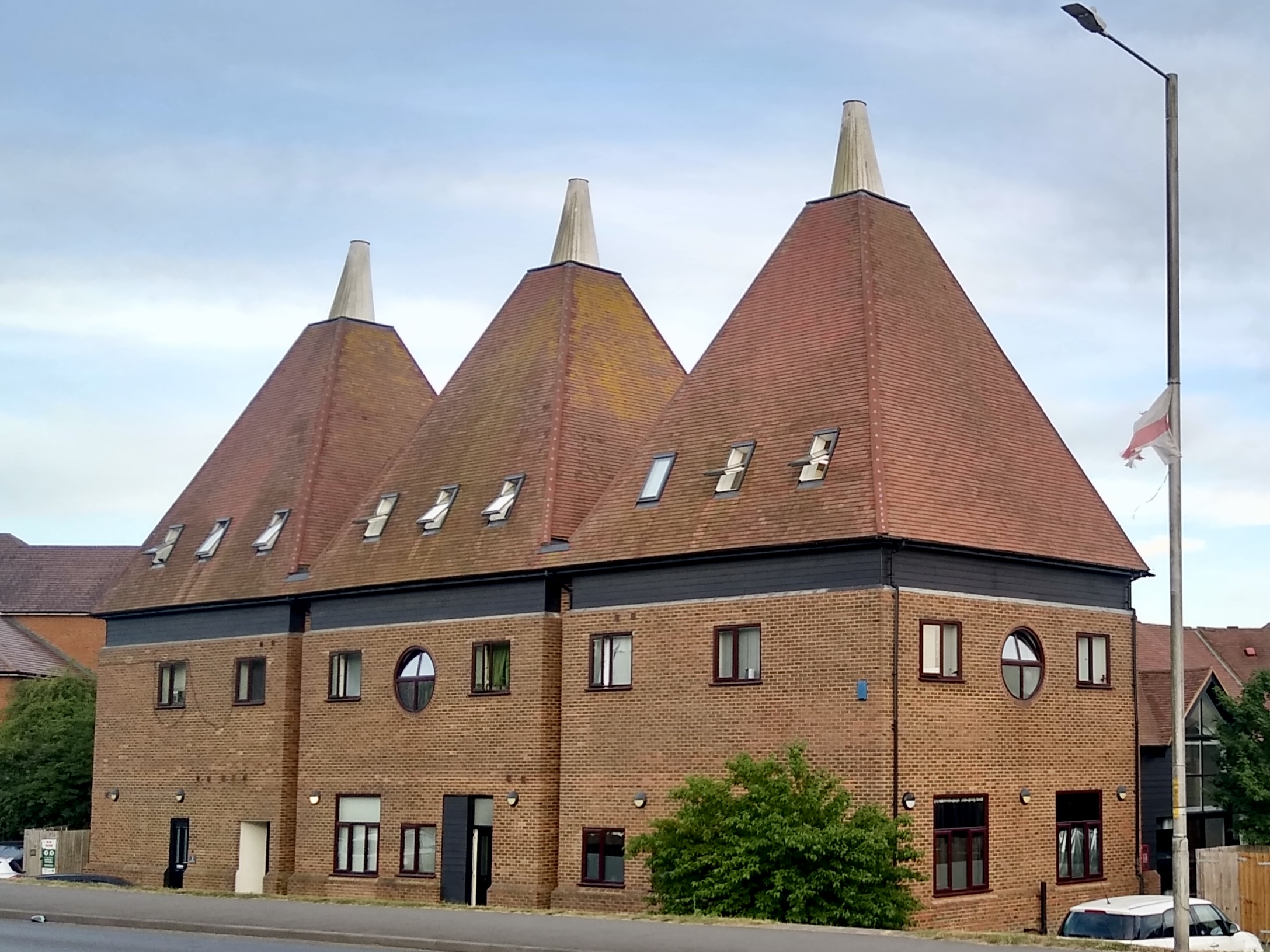
Fake oast at Harrietsham, Kent

In recent years, a number of buildings have been erected to look as though they were oasts, although in fact, that is not the case. Examples of this are:

- Early Bird public house in Grove Green, Maidstone.
- Harrietsham, a group of offices.
- The Oast House public house, Normanton, Derby.
- The Oast House public house, Manchester.
- Langley Court, Beckenham, built by the Wellcome Foundation, now part of Glaxo Wellcome.
- Caring, Kent – Houses built in the form of oasts.
- South Harrow, London – a pub built in the form of an oast (now demolished and rebuilt as part of new housing).
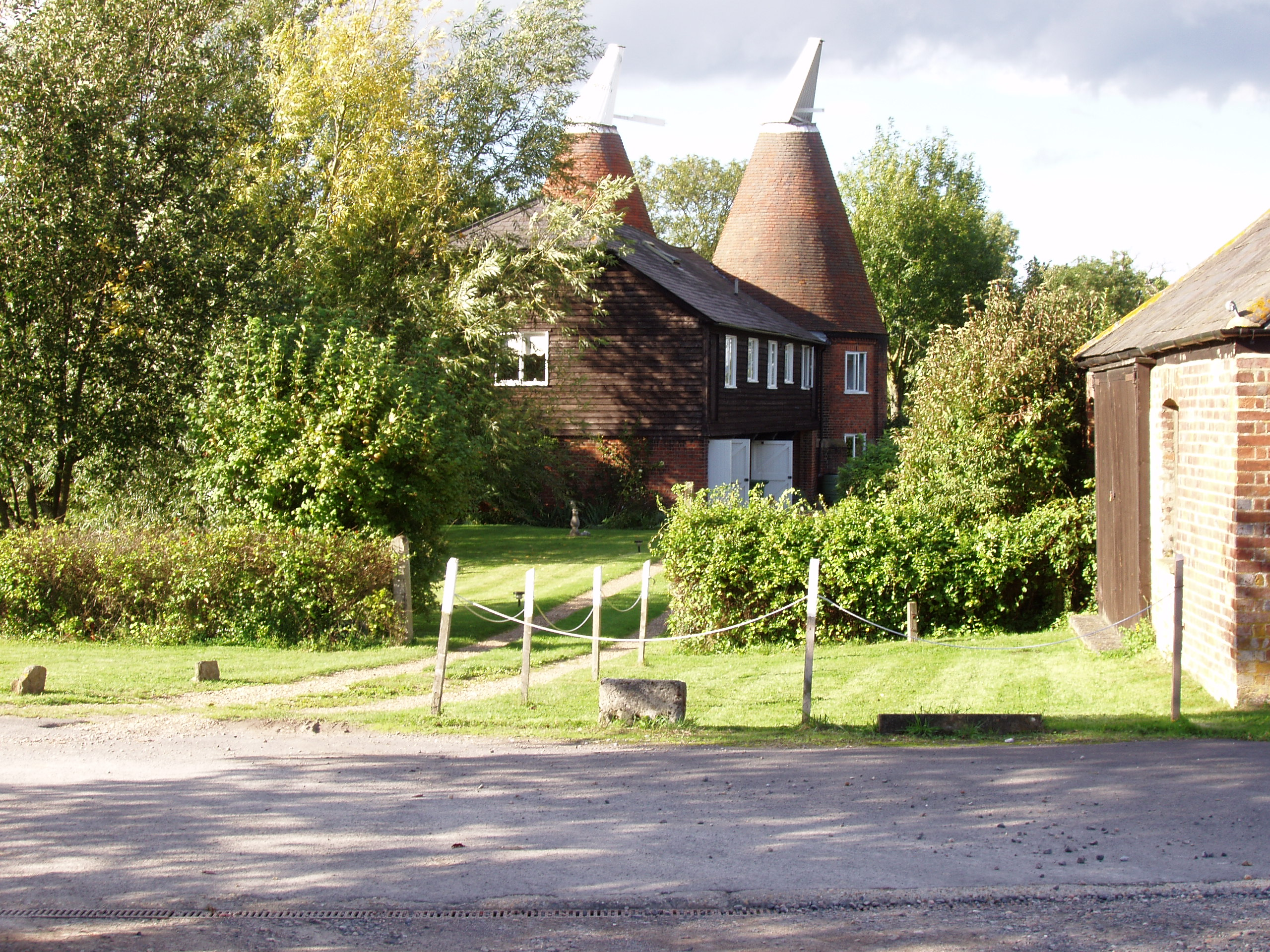
Oast House in Tudeley, Kent, now in residential use

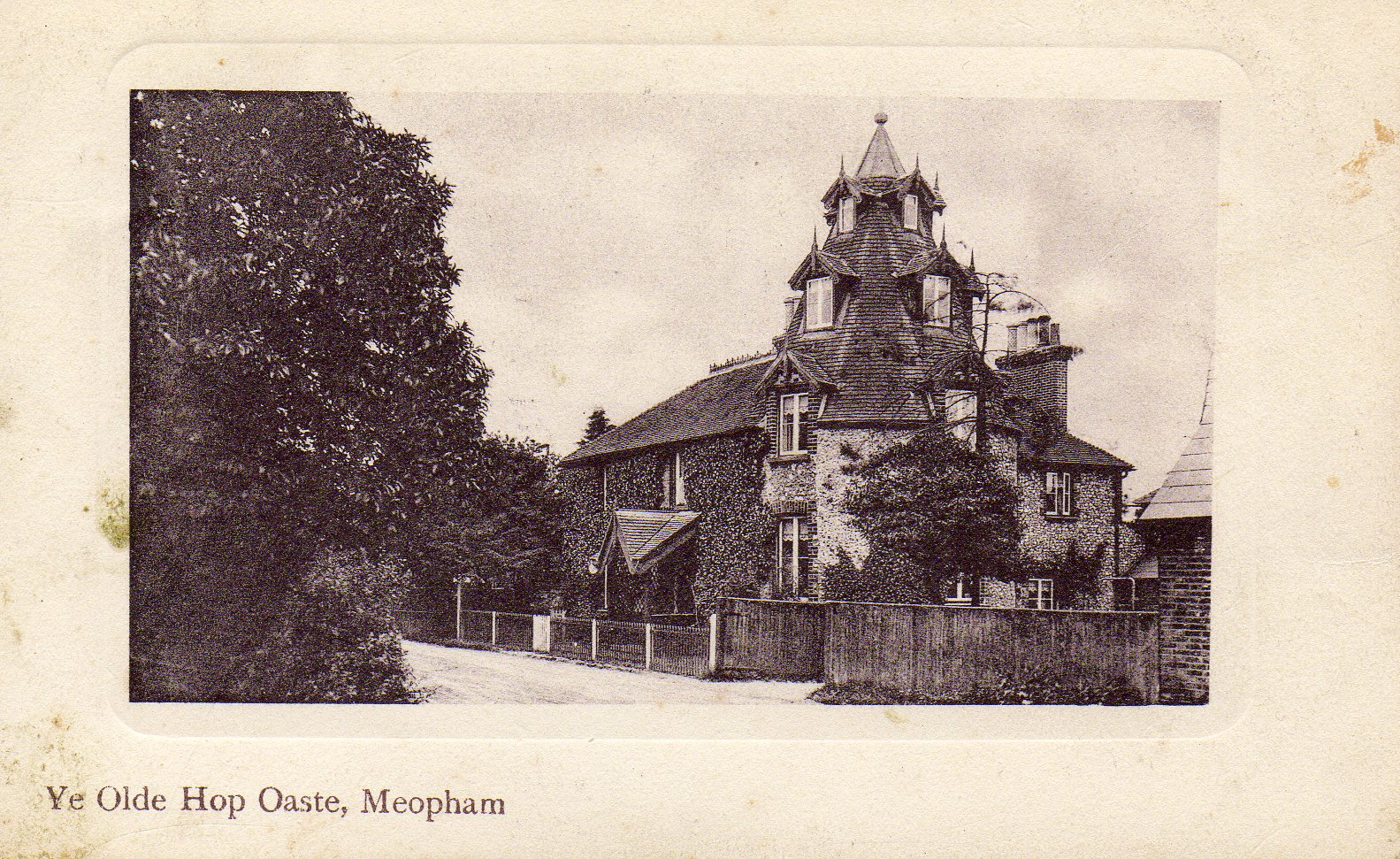
Millar's Farm, Meopham

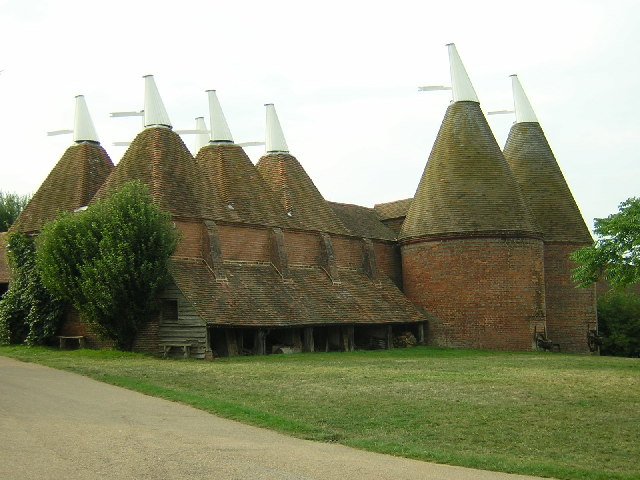
Castle Farm oast, Sissinghurst

== See also ==
- Malthouse - a similarly cowled building used for sprouting barley to make malt, also an ingredient in beer making.
- Chunche - a building for drying raisins (using the natural hot dry wind) in Xinjiang, China.

== Sources ==
- Edmonds, Robin Q. (2008). Junior King's School, Canterbury, 1879-1956. Canterbury: Parkers.
- Filmer, Richard (1982). Hops and Hop Picking. Princes Risborough, Aylesbury: Shire Publication Ltd. ISBN 0-85263-617-2.
- Grattan, Patrick (2021). Oasts and Hop Kilns, a History. Liverpool and Swindon: Liverpool University Press for Historic England. ISBN 978-1-78962-251-5.
- Hopkinson, Jean (1988). A Pocketful of Hops. Bromyard: Bromyard Local History Society. ISBN 0-9502068-4-9.
- Walton, R; Walton, I (1998). Kentish Oasts. Burnt Mill, Egerton: Christine Swift. ISBN 0-9506977-7-X.
- Walton, Robin (1984). Oasts in Kent. Maidstone: Christine Swift. ISBN 0-9506977-3-7.
- Jerrold, Walter (1907). Highways and Byways in Kent. London: Macmillan.
- Jones; Bell (1992). Oasthouses in Sussex and Kent. Chichester: Phillimore. ISBN 0-85033-818-2.
- Coles Finch, William (1925). In Kentish Pilgrim Land. London: C W Daniel.
