= Cowl (oast) =

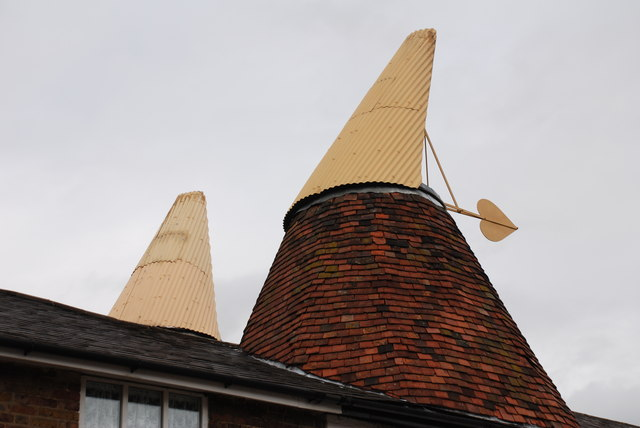
Cowls on a maltings at Ware, Hertfordshire.

A cowl is a device used on a kiln to keep the weather out of and to induce a flow of air through the kiln. They are normally associated with oasts but can also be found on breweries (Letheringsett, Norfolk), maltings (Ware, Hertfordshire; Hadlow, Kent) and watermills (East Linton, East Lothian).

== Construction ==
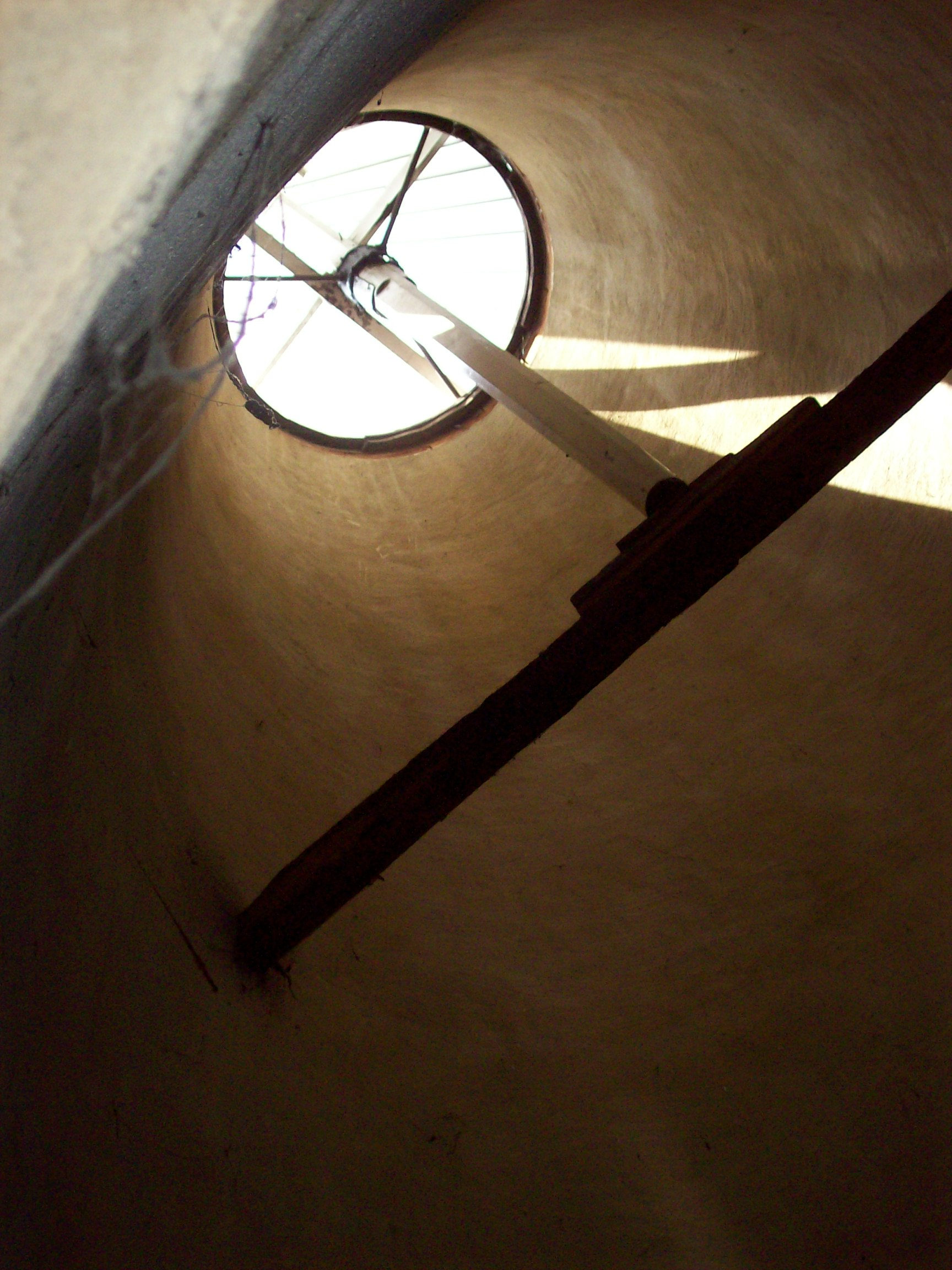
The inside of a kiln, looking up to the cowl

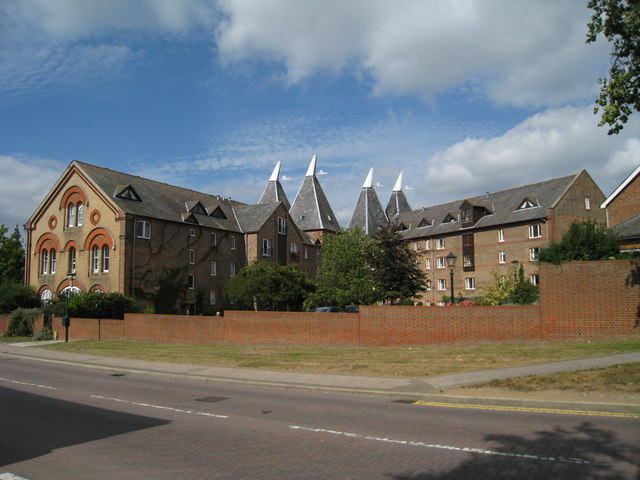
Close Brewery, Hadlow, Kent

This section deals with the traditional cowls found on oasts, with particular reference to the South East. From the outside, a cowl appears to just sit on the roof of the kiln. High in the roof of the kiln is a beam spanning the centre, called the sprattle beam, this carries a bearing which the pintle on the bottom of the centre post sits in. At the top of the kiln, the centre post passes through a two or three armed top stay iron. At the top of the centre post is carried the back board which carries an elm curb ring at the bottom, and one or two curb rings higher up on all except the smallest of cowls. A tie beam could also be carried, either at each curb level, or just the bottom curb level, spanning the width of the cowl. The top of the backboard carries a shaped top plate to which the weatherboards were affixed. The whole is covered in tapered weatherboards, widest at the bottom and narrowest at the top. Slotted through the centre post and attached to the back board is the distinctive finger which sometimes carried a motif. The finger assisted the turning of the cowl in light winds. Weatherboards would be attached to the cowl with nails made from copper. Cowls were usually painted white, although some were cream. The cowl is constructed so that when looking down vertically on a kiln, it covers the whole of the opening. It also covers some 2/3 to 3/4 of the circumference of the kiln opening, the remaining section being open to allow air to vent from the kiln.

The size of cowls is expressed as height from top plate to base by width of kiln opening covered. Cowls varied in size from 7 ft × 5 ft (2.1 m × 1.5 m) to 24 ft × 15 ft (7.3 m × 4.6 m).

== Description ==
The cowl always has its back to the wind, with the finger pointing in the direction toward which the wind is blowing. As the wind blows past the cowl, it creates a low pressure area inside the edge boards of the cowl. In the bottom of the kiln are various openings; with these open, a flow of air through the kiln is created, added to which is the heated air when a kiln is in use rising naturally as it is less dense than cold air.

== Removal and repair ==
The building and maintenance of cowls was generally the job of a wheelwright. To remove a cowl, a cowl pole would be bolted to one of the main beams of the kiln, and the top would protrude from the top of the kiln. A rope would be passed over the pulley at the top of the cowl pole and tied around the cowl. The finger would be removed, and the coach bolt securing the centre post to the backboard undone. The cowl could then be lifted off the tenon at the top of the centre post and lowered down the kiln. Ropes were also tied at each end of the tie beam if present. The cowl could either be lowered inverted, or alternatively, a ladder would be placed against the kiln roof and the cowl be carried down by the wheelwright, the weight being mainly taken by those in the kiln working on the rope. It was important to avoid damaging the kiln roof. Replacement was a reversal of the above process. The modern method involves using a mobile crane.

== Local variations ==
There are variations in style among cowls.

- Kent type

The standard cowl as described in the construction section.

- Sussex type

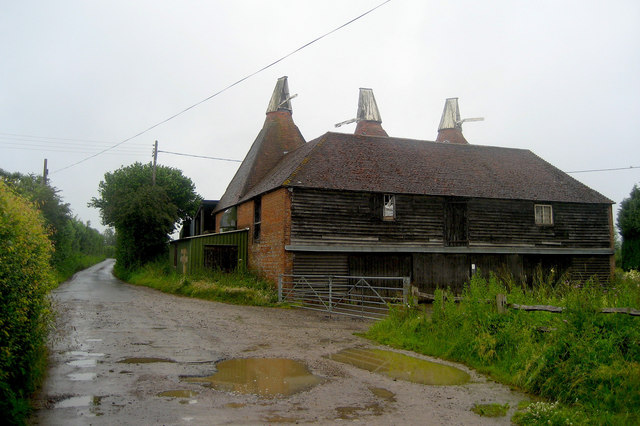
Oast with Sussex type cowls

The Sussex type of cowl has an elongated top plate, giving the cowl a hooded appearance. Sussex type cowls could be found on Kent oasts, and Kent type cowls could be found on oasts in Sussex. Some oasts carried both types of cowl.

- West Midlands

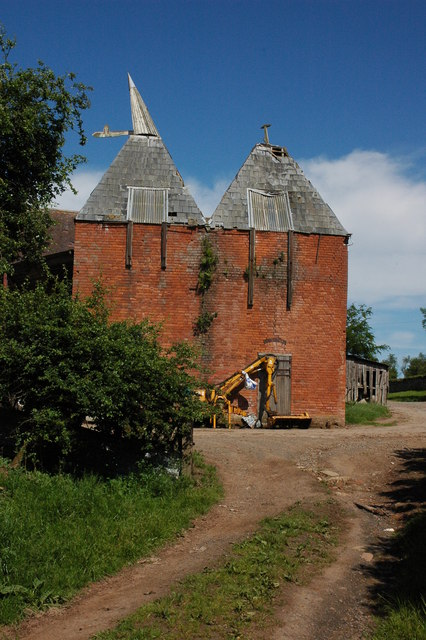
Oast with a West Midlands type cowl

The West Midlands type of cowl is similar to the Kent type, but without the top board. The weather boards meeting in a point.

- Other cowls

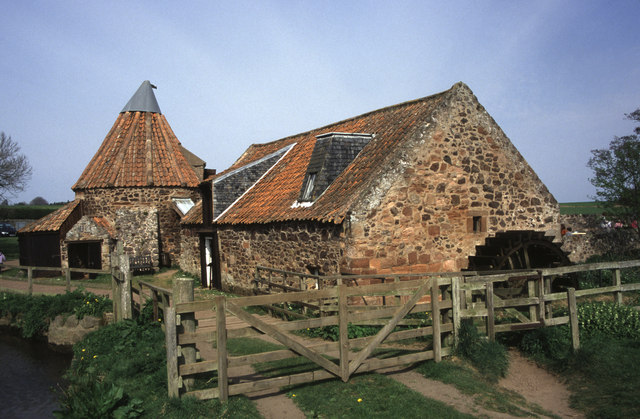
Preston Mill, East Linton, East Lothian

Cowls found outside the main hop growing areas were generally much cruder in construction and very different in looks. Often they were much squatter in appearance than oast cowls.

The Richard Rogers designed National Assembly Building in Cardiff features a six-metre-high purpose built rotating wind cowl providing ventilation to the debating chamber. The design was inspired by traditional oast houses.

== Creaking ==
Reports in the media have mentioned the cowls can creak and is a 'feature' of oast houses. This is generally true, however the creaking can be eliminated by greasing the bearing. By climbing inside and putting grease at the bottom of the pole and around the top metal ring all noises when the cowl turns are thwarted. Some use a long stick with grease on to reach the very top as it can be as much as 7M above the internal floor.

== Sources ==
- Walton, Robin (1984). Oasts in Kent. Maidstone: Christine Swift. ISBN 0-9506977-3-7.
- Jones & Bell (1992). Oasthouses in Sussex and Kent. Chichester: Phillimore. ISBN 0-85033-818-2.
- A Pocketful of Hops. Bromyard: Bromyard Local History Society. 1988. ISBN 0-9502068-4-9.
