= Ditton, Kent =

Village in Kent, England

Coordinates: 51.294850°N 0.451900°E

Ditton
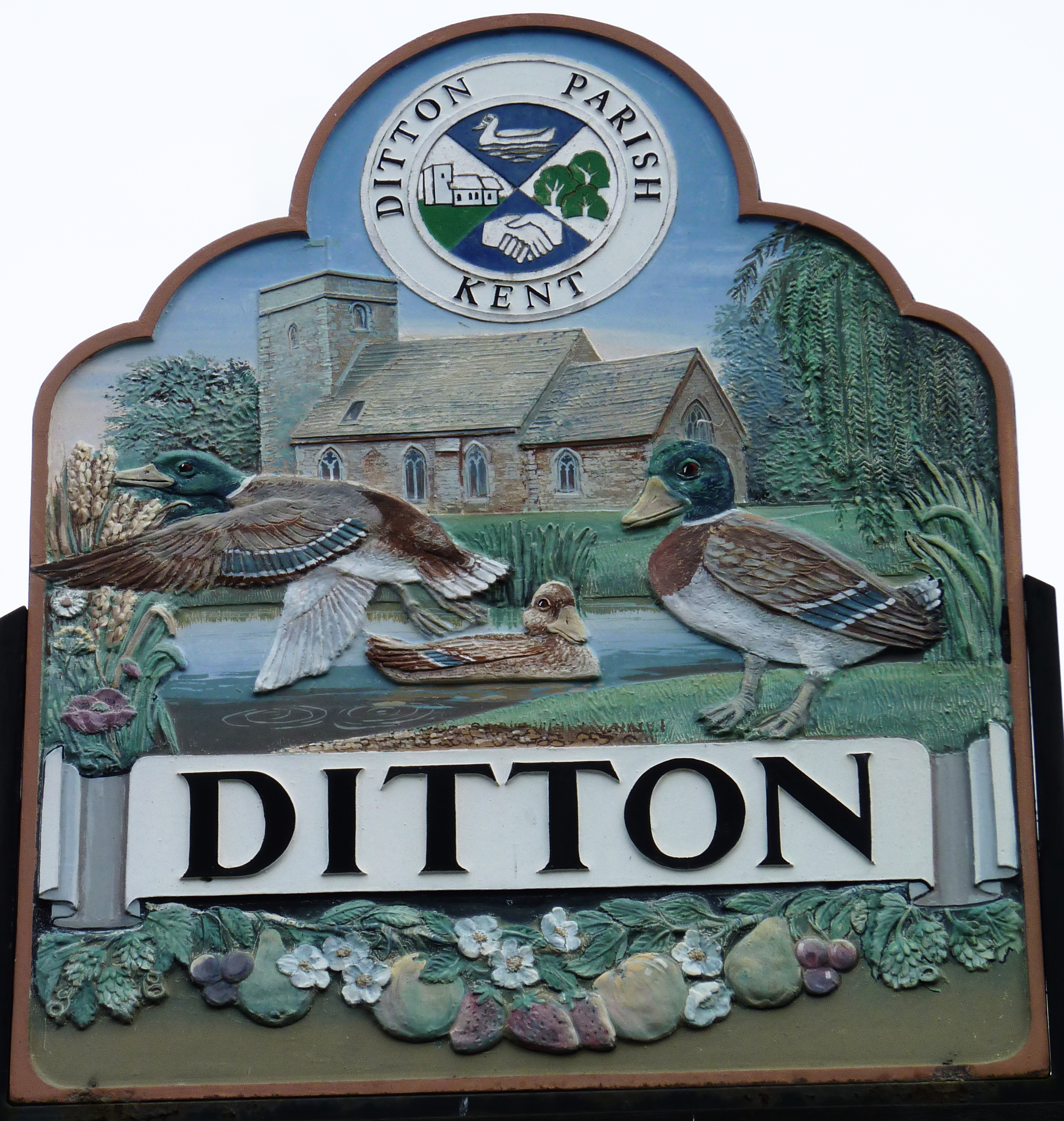
- Ditton Village Sign

- Location within Kent
- Population: 4,786 (2011)
- OS grid reference: TQ 71038 58464
  - London: 31 mi (50 km) WNN
- Civil parish: Ditton
- District: Tonbridge and Malling
- Shire county: Kent
- Region: South East
- Country: England
- Sovereign state: United Kingdom
- Post town: Aylesford
- Postcode district: ME20
- Dialling code: 01732
- Police: Kent
- Fire: Kent
- Ambulance: South East Coast
- UK Parliament: Chatham and Aylesford

Ditton is a large village and civil parish in the borough of Tonbridge and Malling in Kent, England. The village is 4.6 miles (7.4 km) west-northwest of Maidstone and 1.8 miles (2.9 km) east of West Malling. The parish, which is long and narrow, straddles the A20 (the old Dover to London road), with farmland to the south and industry to the north. It lies in the Medway Valley, on the northern edge of the Kent Weald, and adjoins the ancient parishes of Larkfield, Aylesford and Barming. In 2011 it had a population of 4,786.

== History ==
The origins of the village can be traced to the stream which runs through the parish and gave rise to many corn mills along its length. The earliest recorded mention of the village is in the Domesday Book of 1086. The village contains a number of listed buildings, which include a 12th-century church, an old mill house, and two oast houses.

More recently, ragstone and newsprint industries have developed and become essential sources of local employment. The population of the village snowballed with the overspill of housing from the nearby town of Maidstone. Today Ditton has a mixed agricultural and industrial economy, with a wide range of social and leisure facilities. In 2001 it had a population of 4,786.

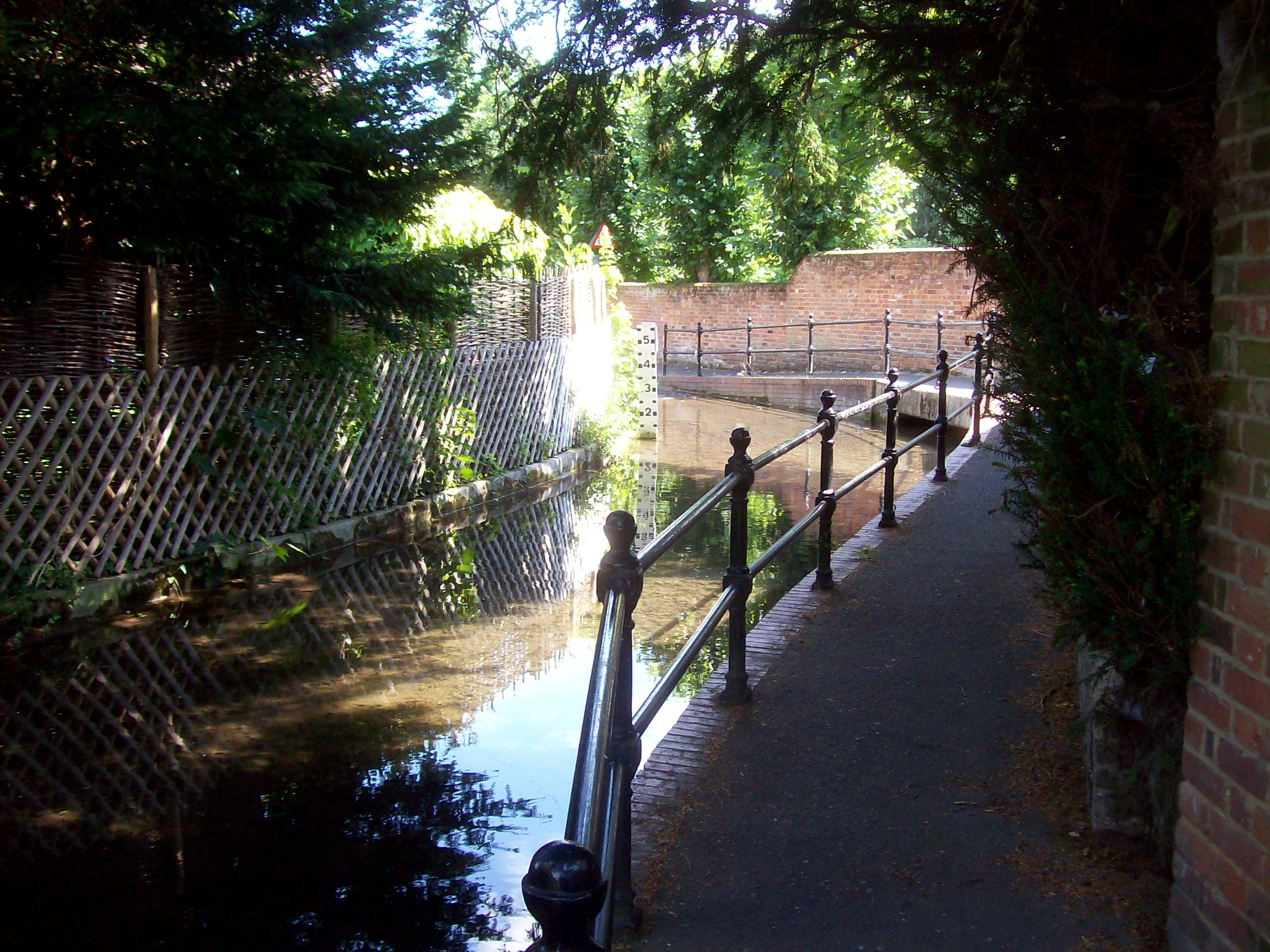
The ford in Bradbourne Stream, Ditton

The name Ditton comes from the Saxon "Dictune" meaning the village situated on the dike, or trench of water. This derives from the Bradbourne Stream which rises near East Malling and passes through the village. The stream supplied the now defunct Aylesford Newsprint site, once the largest paper recycling factory in Europe, with part of its water supply.

Evidence of the early occupation of Ditton is scant. A Mesolithic tranchet axe, a sharpening flake, three microliths and 36 blades were found at Ditton, but the exact site of the find is now unknown. Mesolithic flint implements, Iron Age pottery and pit dwellings have also been reported in the Holt Hill area of Ditton.

An Anglo-Saxon spearhead was found in July 1962 by D. Tamkin in cutting through a natural knoll of sand on Messrs Reed's playing fields at Cobdown, Ditton. It is possible that the spearhead came from a grave on the top of the knoll, destroyed during the making or widening of the cutting. The first recorded mention of Ditton is in the Domesday Book, with an entry dated 1086. At that time the village had 31 dwellings. The Domesday Book states:

"Haimo the sheriff holds of the bishop (of Baieux) Dictune. It was taxed at one suling. The arable land is four carucates. In demesne there are two, and 20 villeins, with five borderers, having three carucates. There is a church and six servants, and one mill of 10 shillings, and eight acres of meadow, and 35 acres of pasture. Wood for the pannage of six hogs. In the time of King Edward the Confessor, it was worth 8 pounds, when he received it 100 shillings, now 8 pounds. Sbern held it of King Edward."

There was another estate (manor) in the parish at that time called Sifletone, which also belonged to the Bishop of Baieux (Bayeux), and was entered into the Domesday Book: "Vitalis holds of the bishop (of Baieux) Sifletone. It was taxed at three yokes. The arable land is one carucate. In demesne, there is one carucate and a half, and six villeins, with one borderer, having half a carucate. There are six servants, and one mill of 10s. There are ten acres of meadow and thirty acres of pasture. In the time of the Confessor, it was worth 40 shillings when he received it four pounds, now 100 shillings. In the time of king Edward the Confessor, two men, Leuuin and Uluuin, held this land in coparcenary, and could turn themselves over with this land to whomever they would."

Thus there were three manors within the parish; Ditton Manor, with the appendant Brampton Manor, and Sifletone, all of which were owned by the Bishop of Bayeux at this time. The Bishop of Bayeaux was Odo, Earl of Kent, half brother of William the Conqueror. In 1082, after it was discovered that Odo planned a military expedition to Italy, he was imprisoned, and his estates (including Ditton, Brampton, and Sifletone) were confiscated to the Crown. Following this, Ditton Manor appears to have been held by the Clares, earls of Gloucester, by a family who assumed their surname from Ditton. Likewise, Sifletone was confiscated and went to another family who took their surname from it.

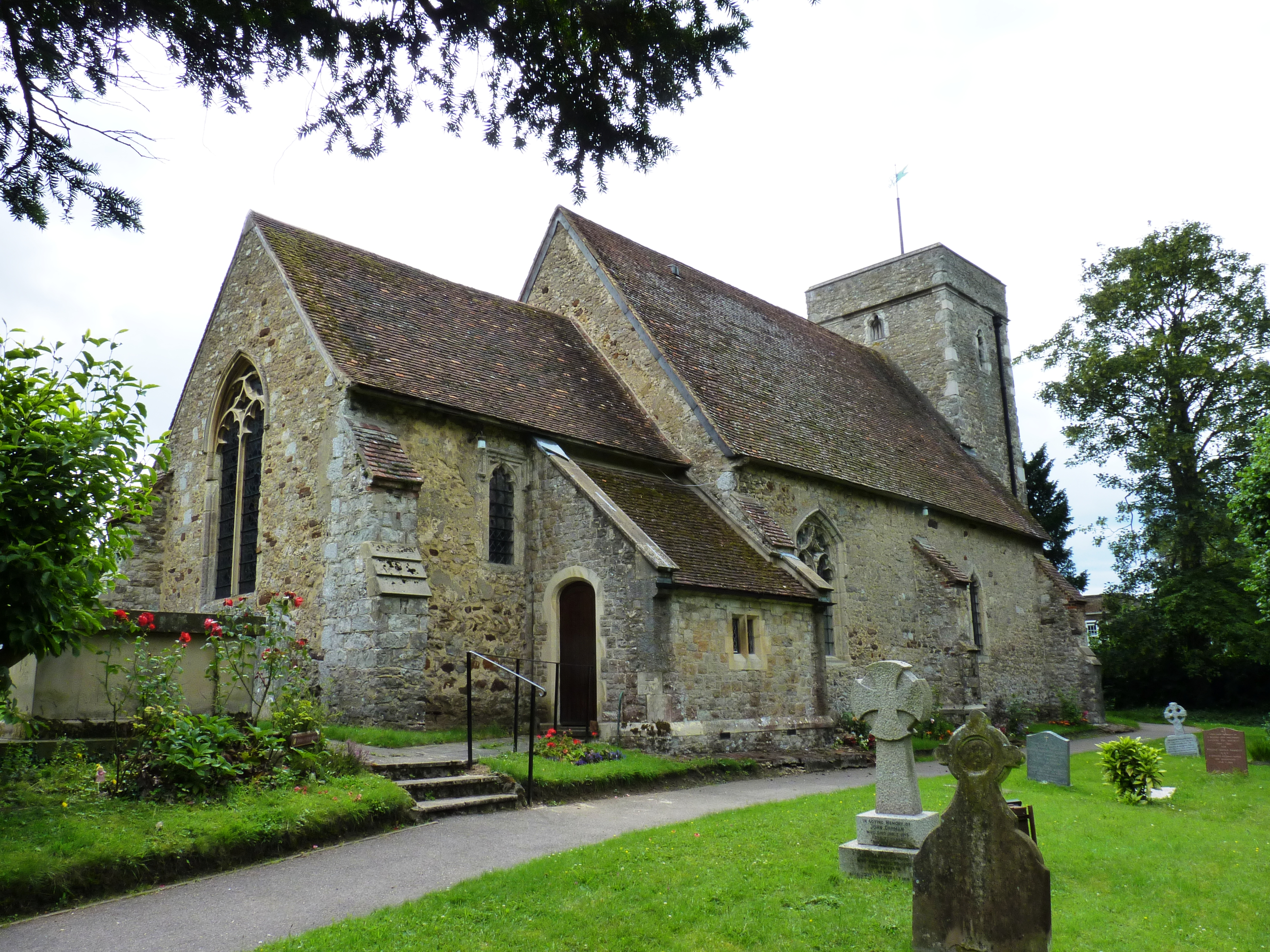
St. Peter's Ad Vincula Church, Ditton

Ditton has a ford which, along with St Peter's Ad Vincula's Church, is situated in a conservation area on the west of a large green. The church is dated to the 12th century with a later 14th-century tower, and the first bell of Ditton church was hung there in 1656. Ditton parish register has as its opening words, "The Register book of Ditton beginning Anno Dom. 1663. William Jole, rector, inducted Rector of Ditton, 1st August, Anno Dom. 1663." Also at the commencement, it is recorded, on 1 August 1711, that every acre of woodland in the parish of Ditton by immemorial custom pays tithe to the rector. In 1798 Ditton was recorded as being within the ecclesiastical jurisdiction of the Diocese of Rochester, and deanery of Malling. This parish, among others, was obliged to contribute to the repair of the fifth pier of Rochester bridge. The church was restored in 1860 by Sir George Gilbert Scott.

The north nave window has fragments of 14th-century glass, and the nave has a good selection of hanging wall monuments and a benefactions board. A lead plaque on the nave wall, removed from the tower roof in 1859, has a picture of a ship from Nelson's time scratched on it. The mill that was recorded in the Domesday Book, Church Mill, was located close to the ford and closed down around 1912.

In 1798 the parish was described in the following terms: "The high road from London, through Wrotham, to Maidstone, crosses the middle of it, at the thirty-first milestone; the village stands on it, and the church about a quarter of a mile further southward, on an ascent, beyond which, the parish reaches into the large tract of coppice woods, which extends as far as Teston and Barming. The stream from Bradborne Park runs through this parish and village, across the above road, and having turned two mills, one above and the other below it, runs on to the River Medway, which is the northern boundary of this parish, near the north-west extremity of which, on the road leading from Larkfield to Newhith, and not far distant from that hamlet and the river, is Borough Court. This parish is rather an obscure place, and has nothing further worthy of notice in it."

The three manors (estates) of Ditton, Brampton, and Sifletone were back in common ownership in the reign of Henry VII, when they belonged to "Thomas Leigh of Sibton in Liminge". The subsequent history of the manors is as follows:

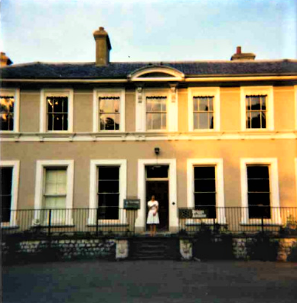
Ditton Place, front view taken in the mid-1980s

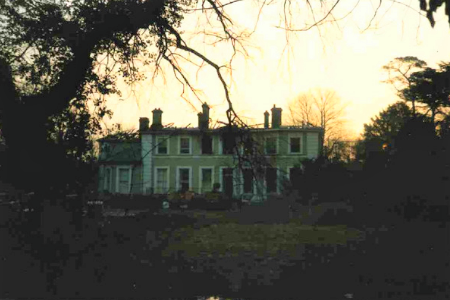
Ditton Place following the fire of 1987 and shortly before demolition

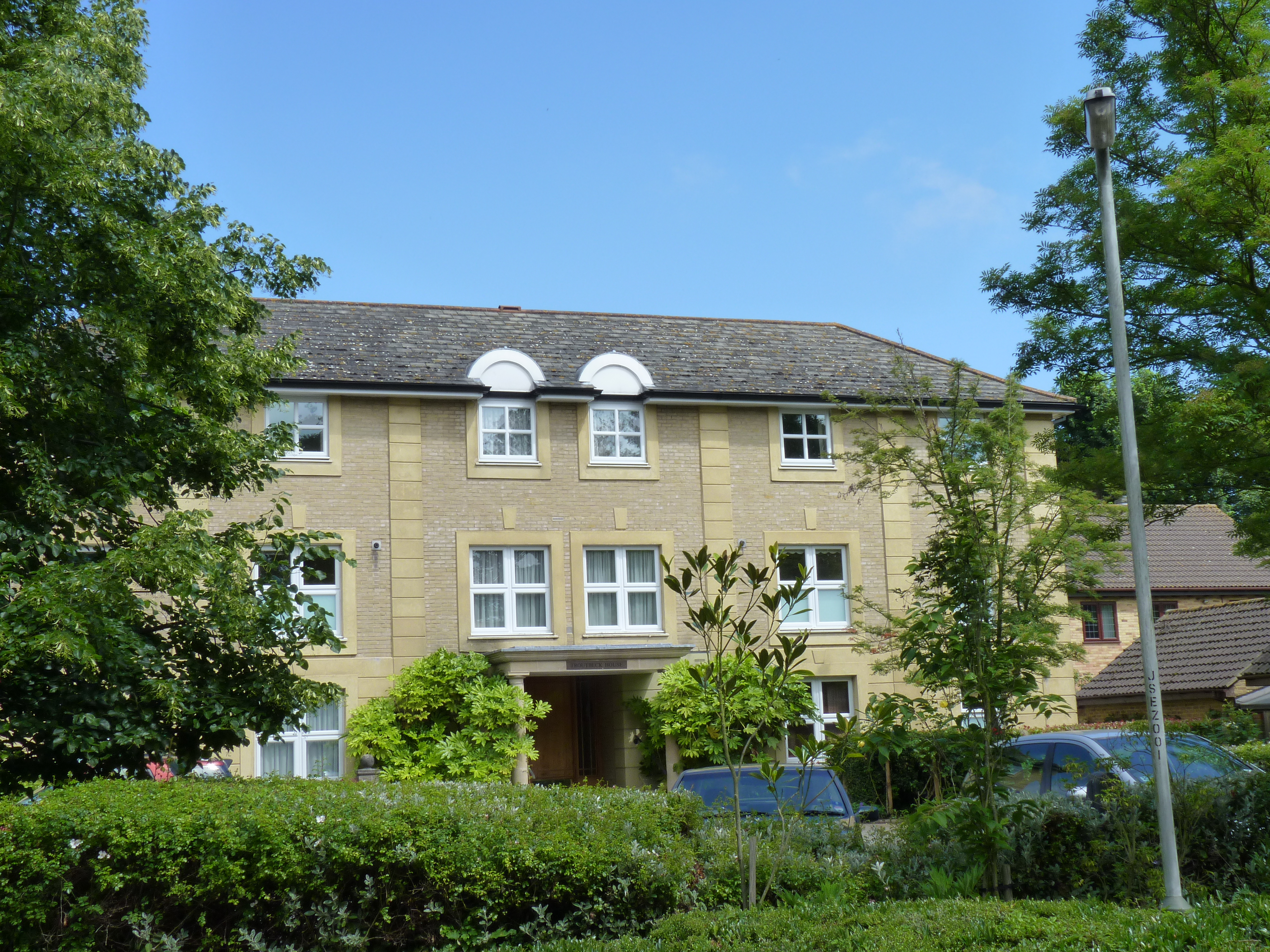
Troutbeck House

The manor of Ditton included a mansion called Ditton Place, not to be confused with Ditton Court. Ditton Place was built in the late 16th century by the Brewer family and stood on the site now occupied by Troutbeck House. It remained in the Brewer family until 1701 when, by default of mortgage, it came into the possession of Thomas Golding of Leybourne Castle who, in 1703, served as Sheriff of Kent. He bequeathed Ditton Place to his nephew, Thomas Golding of Ryarsh, who sold it to John Brewer, a prominent lawyer and member of parliament. John Brewer's daughter, Mrs Carney of West Farleigh, re-conveyed the house back to Thomas Golding again in about 1735. His son, John Golding, inherited it in 1769. There is a reference in Organa Britannica to an organ built by renowned organ builder John Avery which was moved in the late 18th century from West Malling Parish Church to a recess in the hall of Ditton Place, described as the manor house of the area and owned by the Golding family. John Golding's son, also called John, was the last of his family to reside there. He died at Ditton Place in 1856, whereafter it was purchased by Septimus Maitland, a former plantation owner from Jamaica, who substantially remodelled the house around 1860. In 1876, it was purchased from Maitland by the Rev. John Young Stratton, a prominent campaigner against rural poverty, and Rector of Ditton for 48 years. Ditton Place was destroyed by arson in 1987. Today, Troutbeck House lies at the centre of a modern housing estate. One of the roads of the estate takes its name from the original house.

Ditton Court was located just to the west of St Peter's Church. Court is a term used widely in Kent in place of manor. Ditton Court was the seat of the Lord of the Manor of Ditton, but over the centuries most holders of the manor were possessed of landholdings elsewhere and held Ditton in absentia. When the lord was in attendance, it was often to preside over the manorial court, which decided local issues relating to land tenure, services owed to the lord by his tenants, and even petty crime. Ditton Court was demolished in 1972 to make way for a modern housing development that bears its name.

Brampton Manor probably stood on the site of the New Road Industrial Estate. After the manor was destroyed the site was known as Brampton Field, at least until the 18th century, and indeed one of the streets of the housing estate which covers the site today is named Brampton Field.

Sifflington Manor (Sifletone) was an estate within Ditton parish and appeared to have been incorporated into Ditton Manor at some stage before the 19th century.

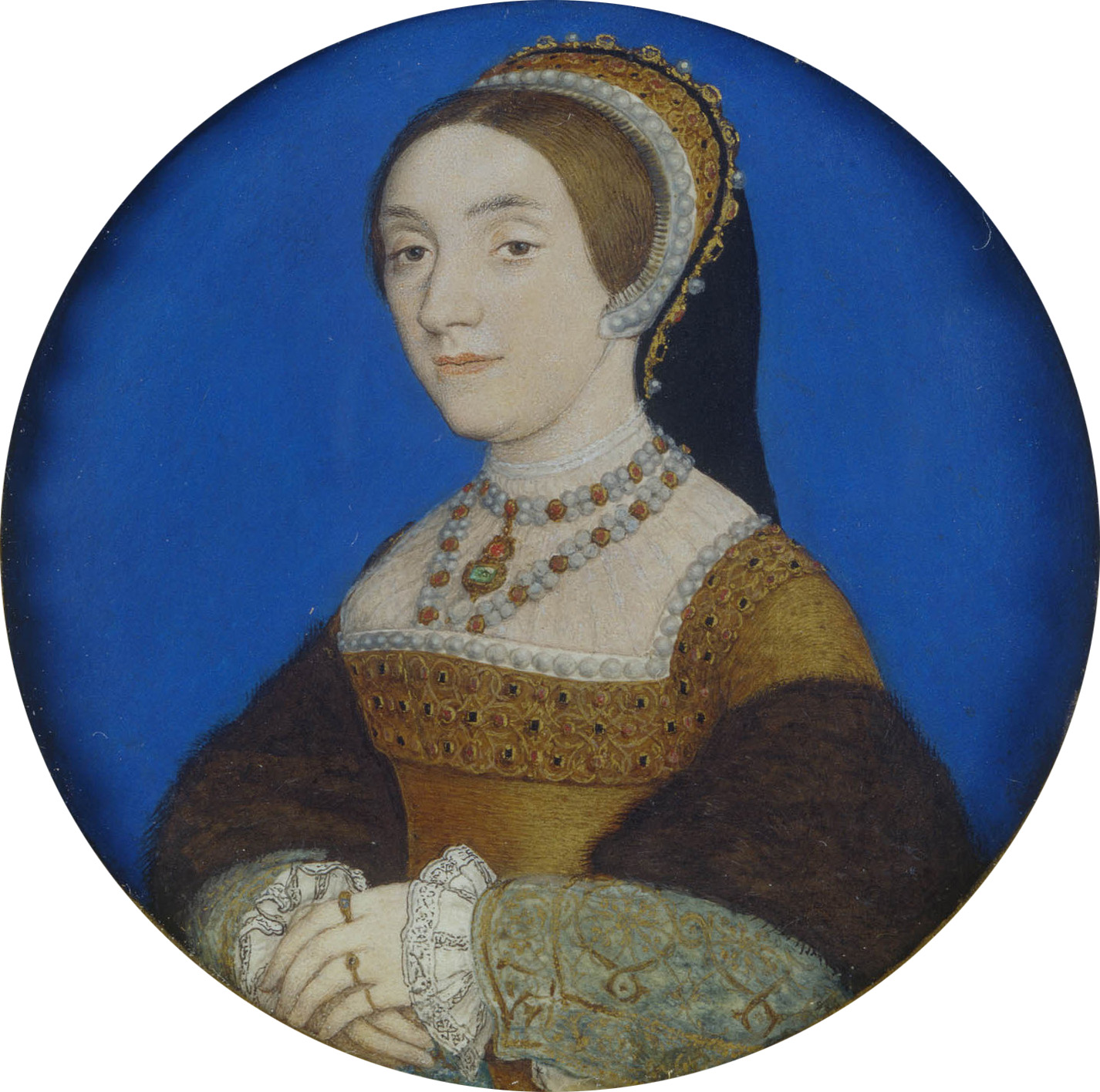
Catherine Howard

A manor house, Borough Court (also known as Brooke Court), stood in the northernmost part of the parish; though it no longer exists it probably stood in the vicinity of the modern Aylesford Newsprint site. The Culpepper family of Aylesford owned the house during the reign of King Edward III (1327–1377). The High Sheriff of Kent in 1426–27, Walter Culpeper, was the owner until the house devolved onto his heirs, eventually passing to Richard Culpeper (later Sir Richard Culpepper) who also owned the manor house at Oxon Hoath. Sir Richard Culpepper died in 1484 without issue, and the house was divided amongst his three daughters, one of whom was Joyce Culpeper—whose daughter was Catherine Howard and would become the fifth wife of King Henry VIII. The house was then sold to Francis Shakerly who hailed from Shakerly, Kent.

=== Notable people ===
- William Kempe, the parson of Ditton, was sued for £80 in 1534 for being absent from his parish and for taking a stipend for saying prayers for the souls of the dead (which was prohibited by a statute of 1529). Although Kempe admitted being absent, he claimed that he was chaplain to Baron John Zouche and thus entitled to receive two benefices.

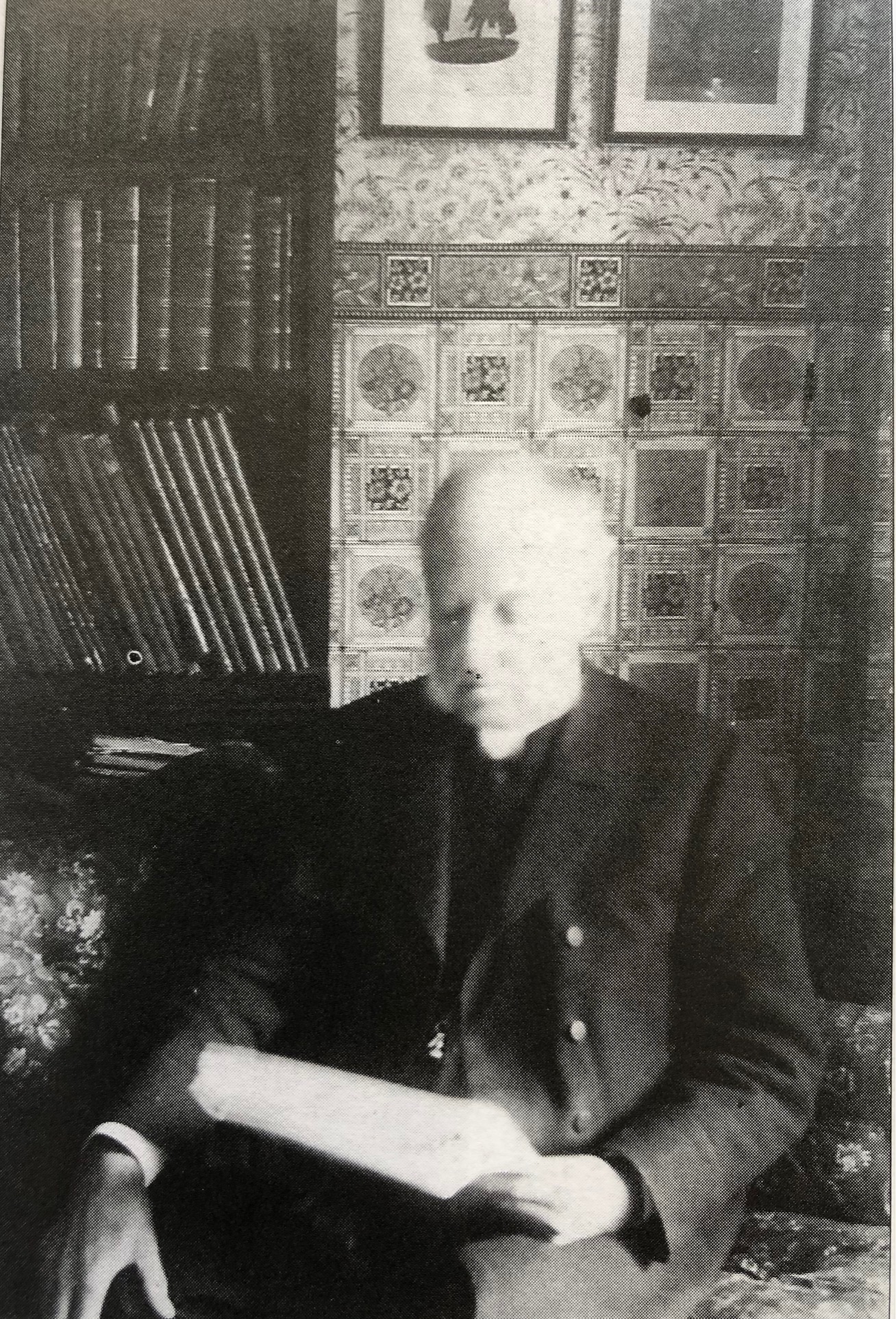
The Rev. John Young Stratton in his study at Ditton Place, 1890s

- The Rev. John Young Stratton (1829/30 – 1905) was an author, essayist, social reformer, campaigner against rural poverty, and Rector of Ditton for 48 years. He is now remembered chiefly for his tireless campaigning to improve the lives of farm labourers and hop-pickers. In terms of the latter, the remaining hopper huts across Kent and further afield are a testament to his legacy. In 1868, he advocated for a system of national insurance to be administered through the Post Office, which closely resembles the modern welfare state. A highly respected figure, his obituary referred to him as “probably the best known clergyman in Mid-Kent” and “the Hoppers’ friend”. John Stratton was also responsible for the restoration and alteration of St Peter’s Church in 1860, under the supervision of Sir (George) Gilbert Scott.
- William Boghurst was an apothecary, and native, of Ditton, who remained in London during the Great Plague of 1665. During the plague, his medical practice expanded and he made his name. He stayed in the city throughout the epidemic, treating by his own account "40, 50 or 60 patients a day". By the end of the year his reputation was sufficient to attract offers from the corporation of Norwich, which tried to employ him when the infection reached there. He wrote a book about his experience which, although not printed at the time, was subsequently published in 1894 for the Epidemiological Society of London under the title Loimographia: an Account of the Great Plague of London in the year 1665. In later life his fortunes appear to have declined, as he could not afford the livery of his company in 1682. Boghurst died on 2 September 1685 aged 54 and was conveyed from London to be buried in the churchyard at Ditton.

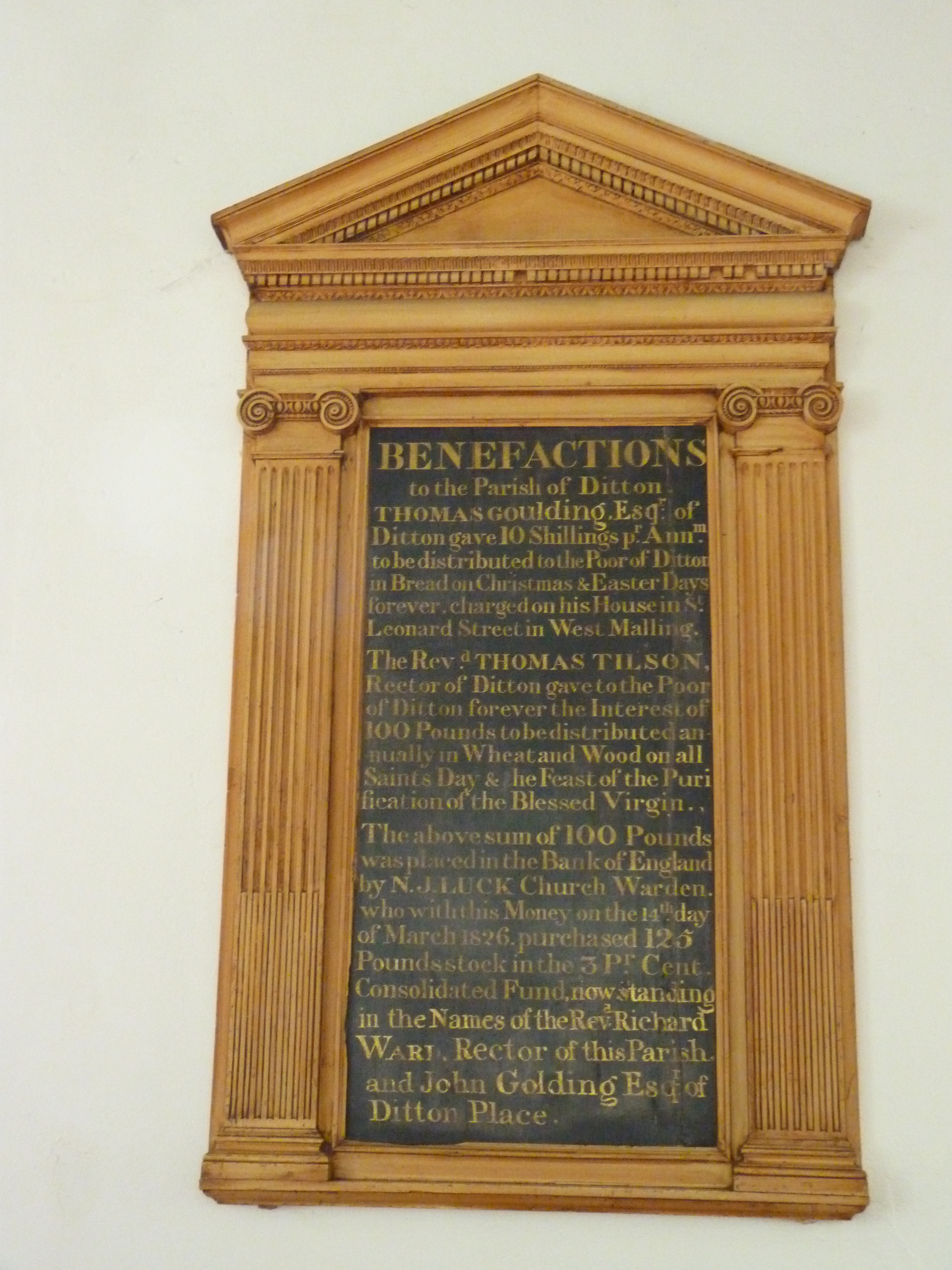
Memorial to Thomas Tilson in St. Peter's Church.

- Thomas Tilson was the rector of Ditton from 1679 to 1702 and was in correspondence with the Protestant cleric Richard Baxter. In one letter Tilson described how a woman from Rochester had gone to her father's house in West Malling where she died on 4 June 1691. While on her death bed, at two o'clock in the morning, she appeared as an apparition to a nurse in Rochester, some nine miles away, where her children were being looked after. It had been the dying woman's wish to see her children before she died, but she had been persuaded not to travel because of her ill health. Baxter included this account in his subsequent book The Certainty of the Worlds of the Spirits published in the same year. Tilson died in 1750 and his memorial in St. Peter's AD Vincula Church records a bequest he made to the poor of "£100 in money, the yearly produce to be distributed annually on the feasts of All Saints and the Purification, in wood and wheat" (see inscription in photograph).
- Reverend Samuel Bishop (1731–95) was a poet, headmaster of Merchant Taylors' school and rector of Ditton. His posthumously published book entitled Poems (1796) was much admired and several times reprinted. Not everyone was complimentary about Bishop and his verses: "the character of Bishop's countenance is not very intellectual, and there is a timid, and almost mean expression about the mouth. He looks but little qualified to insist upon the discipline necessary to be observed at Merchant Tailor's [sic] school or to wield the weapons of Dr. Busby. However, we suppose, he did both occasionally, besides writing his epigrams, and composing verses to his wife, — "To Mrs Bishop." Of this lady, he sometimes sings more like the tea-kettle than the Nightingale".

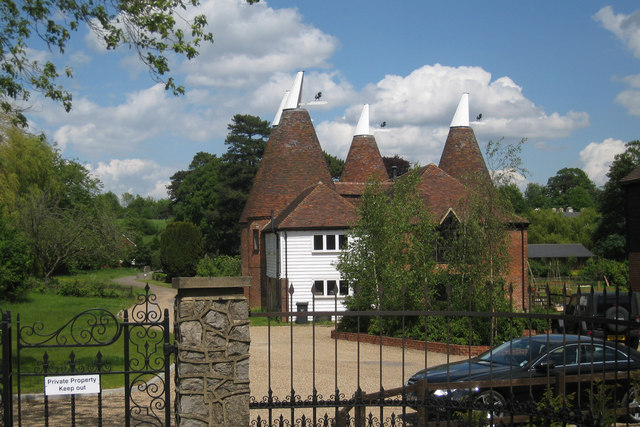
Manor Oast and Greenside Oast – geograph.org.uk – 1314809.jpg

- Thomas Golding, sheriff of Kent in 1703, was living in the nearby parish of Leybourne when he acquired Ditton Place in 1701. He had been the mortgagee of Thomas Brewer in respect of a number of properties when the latter defaulted. His arms were "argent, a cross voided between four lions passant, guardant gules" (a red hollow cross between four lions lying down with their heads and front paws up, on a white or silver background). He left Ditton Place to his nephew, another Thomas, who seems to have sold it and then repurchased it around 1735. The surname Golding is synonymous with a variety of hop known as Goldings and, although there has been some uncertainty as to who discovered the hop, evidence has more recently come to light suggesting it was almost certainly John Golding (who died at Ditton place in 1807), the great-nephew of Thomas and the owner of Ditton Place.
- Lt. Col. Clifford Sheldon, DSO, was joint managing and senior director of Reeds, the paper manufacturer, and was connected with that firm and its associated companies from 1911 until his death in 1950 at the age of 62 years. He gave his name to the Clifford Sheldon Club House, a converted oast house, which subsequently became the Manor and Greenside Oast.
- Edward Humphreys, known as Punter Humphreys, who was born in Ditton in 1881, was an English professional cricketer who played first-class cricket for Kent County Cricket Club between 1899 and 1920. He played nearly 400 first-class matches and coached cricket after his retirement.
- Charles Hooman, often known as Chubby Holman, was born in Ditton in 1887. He was an English amateur sportsman who played cricket for Oxford University and Kent County Cricket Club between 1907 and 1910. He won Blues for golf, rackets and cricket and later represented the Great Britain and Ireland golf team in the Walker Cup in 1922 and 1923. He served in the Royal Naval Reserve during World War I and the RAF Volunteer Reserve during World War II.
- Barry Hawkins (born 23 April 1979) is an English professional snooker player from Ditton. He turned professional in 1996, rising to prominence in the 2004–05 snooker season, when he reached the last 16 of the 2004 UK Championship, the quarter-finals of the 2004 British Open, and the semi-finals of the 2005 Welsh Open. He has now spent twelve successive seasons ranked inside the top 32. He reached his first ranking final and won his first ranking title at the 2012 Australian Goldfields Open.

=== Turnpike ===
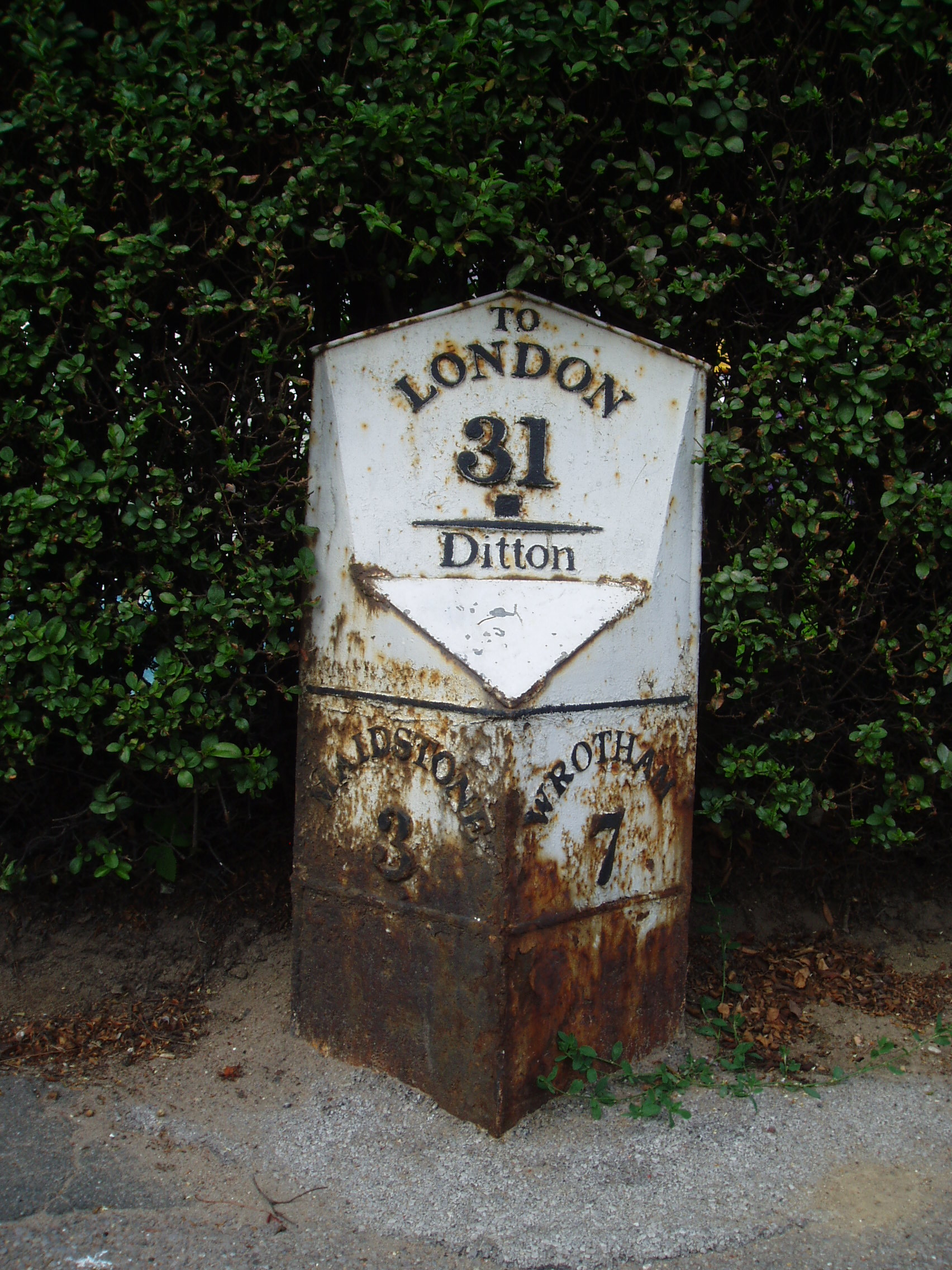
Milepost on the A20, Ditton (NGR TQ7155158319)

The current A20, which runs through the village, was once a turnpike, probably established between 1780 and 1820 to connect London with Dover. The Turnpike Act 1744 required that turnpike trusts set up milestones along these roads. A series of mileposts made in cast-iron appear on the stretch of road between Aylesford and Addington; at Ditton, Larkfield, and Ryarsh. The one at Larkfield is shown on an 1862 Ordnance Survey map, and the Ditton post is shown on a similar map of 1869. Both the Larkfield and Ditton posts are classed as Class II listed buildings.

=== Population ===
In 1663 the population was recorded as 218. The 1831 Topographical Dictionary described Ditton as "a parish in the hundred of Larkfied, lathe of Aylesford ... containing 192 inhabitants." In 1851 the population was 235 and by 1872 the population was 255, with 51 houses in the parish.

=== Education ===
The Ditton Church School was founded in 1853 as a place of education for 70 children, and enlarged in 1887 by the Brassey family for Jubilee of Queen Victoria. A separate infant school opened in 1973.

Ditton Infant School today caters for boys and girls from 4 to 7 years of age and shares its site with Ditton Church of England Junior School. There were 138 children on the infant school roll in 2008, the time of its most recent Ofsted inspection.

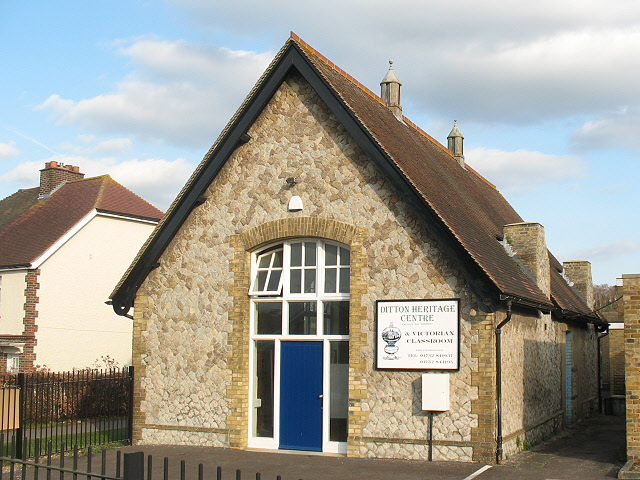
Ditton Heritage Centre, in the old school house

Ditton Church of England Junior School is a primary school catering for mixed pupils aged 5–11 and is adjacent to the infant school. In 2008 there were 277 children on the school roll and it was inspected by Ofsted in 2010.

Aylesford School – Sports College is a secondary school situated in Teapot Lane, Aylesford, in modern buildings. Its catchment area is to the western side of Maidstone and includes pupils from Ditton. The school is for mixed gender pupils in years 7 to 11, with the sixth form for those in years 12 and 13. In 2004 the school gained specialist status as a Sports College, with the result that the curriculum now includes an element of sports education of every aspect. In 2010 there were 944 pupils on the school roll, and it was inspected by Ofsted in the same year.

MidKent College (formerly Mid-Kent College of Higher and Further Education) is the nearest further education college to Ditton. Three campuses, situated in Maidstone and Medway, cater for around 15,000 students aged 16+. The courses offered cover many vocational and academic subjects starting with pre-entry level and finishing at degree level.

Ditton Heritage Centre has been established within an old Victorian building in the village to teach children in the style of a Victorian school. The classroom has been fully restored to represent a typical classroom of the Victorian era.

=== War memorial ===
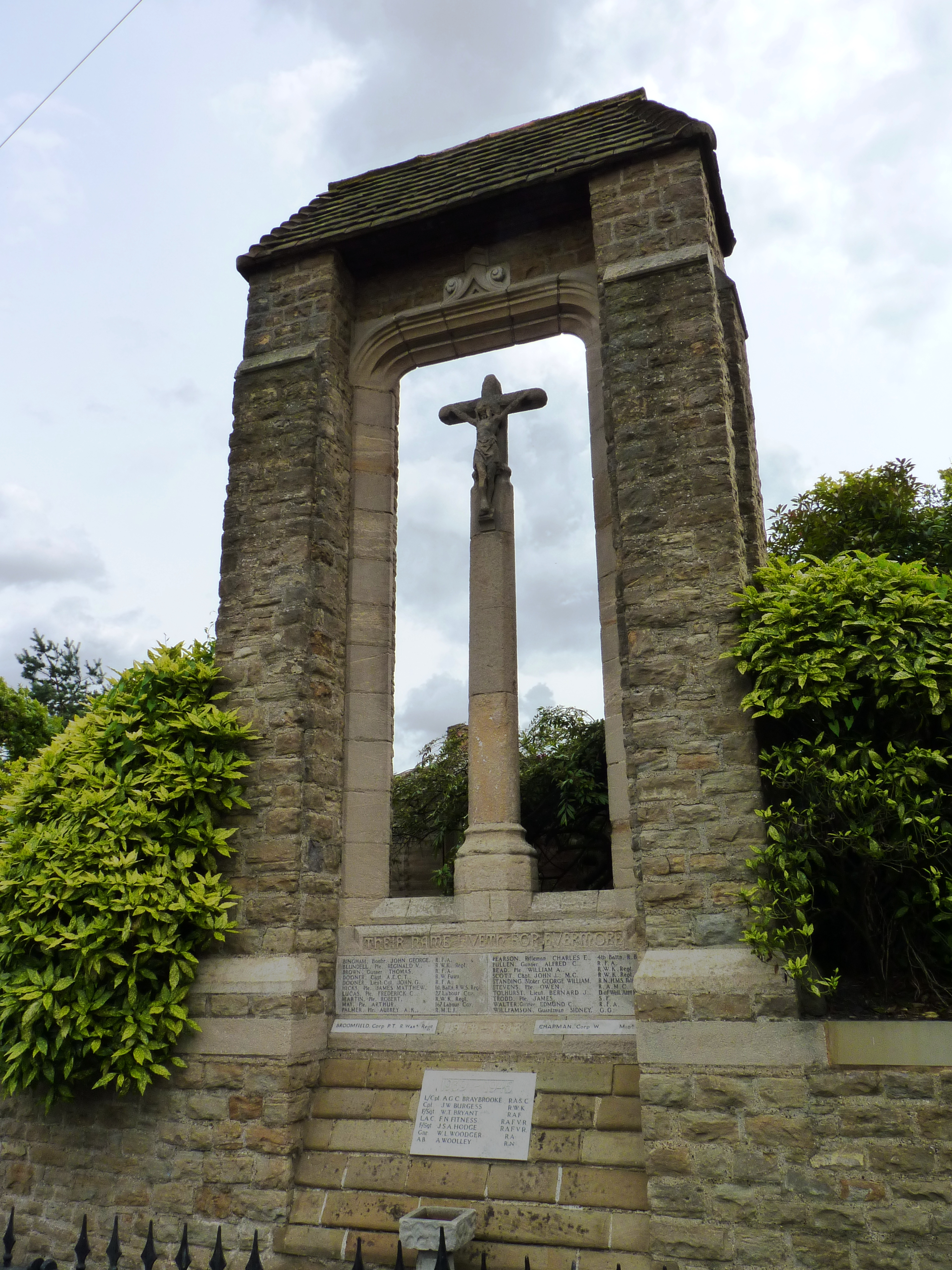
War Memorial, Ditton

Each year a Remembrance Sunday parade takes place, starting in the village at 11am, to commemorate the military personnel who died in World War I (22 names) and World War II (7 names). The parade culminates at the War Memorial, which stands on the eastern side of the junction between the A20 road and New Road. A wreath is laid on the monument by members of local groups and of the parish council.

The monument was designed by Gilbert Scott, who gifted the land the monument stands on to the village. It records the names of the military personnel who fell in the two world wars. Its design is unique among war memorials in the United Kingdom on account of the roof over the cross. The monument was dedicated and unveiled on 26 September 1920, in a ceremony attended by the Bishop of Rochester and General Archibald Murray. The monument was granted listed building status in 2000 as a result of Ditton Parish Council approaching the War Memorial Society for assistance to repair it.

=== Listed buildings in Ditton ===
- 40, The Stream, Ditton, Kent (Grade II)
- 578 London Road, Ditton, Kent (Grade II)
- Church of St Peter Ad Vincula New Road, Ditton, Kent (Grade II*)
- Golding Tomb 15 Yards South of Ditton Church (Grade II)
- Golding Tomb 20 Yards South East of the Chancel of Ditton Church (Grade II)
- Stream Cottages 44–48 (Grade II*)
- Milepost on the A20 London Road, Ditton, Kent
- The Clifford Sheldon Club House, Cobdown Close, Ditton, Kent (Grade II)
- The Old Mill House, 51 The Stream, Ditton, Kent (Grade II)
- War Memorial, 1 New Road, Ditton, Kent (Grade II)

== Geography ==
This history of Ditton has, in part, been shaped by the availability of natural resources in the area, especially water, soil, and rocks. Its position concerning transport links with London, notably the main roads and railways which tend towards the capital city, has also contributed to the village's development. Nowadays the parish is characterised by industrial units to the north, the middle by residential estates, and the south by fields and woodland.

The parish of Ditton lies in the Medway valley and borders the River Medway to the north and the Weald to the south. The Medway is Kent's principal river and rises near East Grinstead in Sussex, flowing eastwards to Maidstone. After passing Ditton parish, it turns north and cuts through the North Downs at Rochester, joining the estuary of the River Thames as its final tributary near Sheerness. The Medway is some 112 kilometres (70 mi) long.

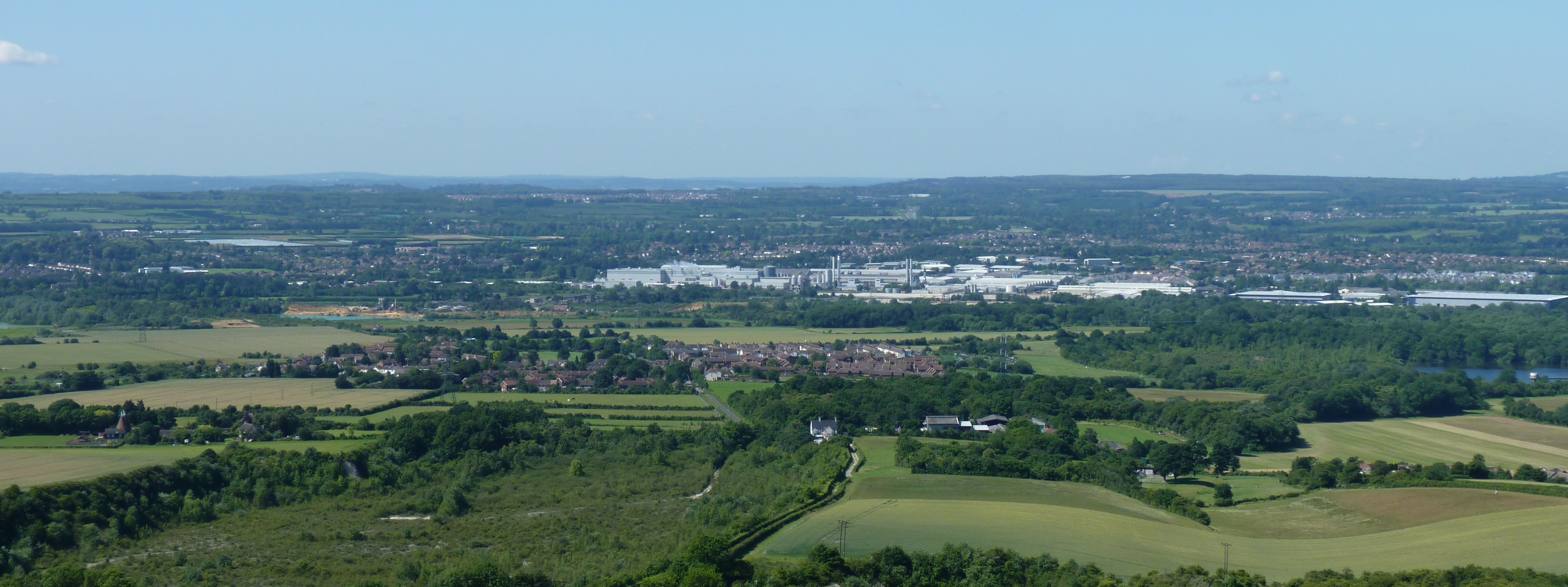
Looking south from Blue Bell Hill across the Medway Valley with the village of Eccles in the foreground, the Aylesford Newsprint plant in the middle ground and Ditton beyond.

The availability of water to transport products and raw materials, and as a resource used in the manufacture of paper, was essential to the historical development of paper mills in the area. Bradbourne stream, which meanders through the parish in a south-east to north-west direction, rises in East Malling, crosses under the A20 road and M20 motorway, and joins the river Medway near the Aylesford Newsprint site. Historically the availability of running water was essential to the early settlements that grew up in Kent, and to the establishment of industries in the area; such as providing power to drive the mills which ground grain.

Ditton is situated between the Lower Weald and the Chalk (North) Downs. The parish encompasses the Lower Greensand strata, where a formation of hard sandy limestone known as the Hythe Beds is abundant. From this formation ragstone is obtained. Kentish ragstone was a historically important building material in southeast England. The Romans used ragstone in the construction of London and villas in the south-east. Medieval builders used ragstone to build churches, civic buildings, houses and bridges over local rivers. The predominance of ragstone beds in the locality gave Ditton a legacy of quarrying which continues today.

== Governance ==
=== Chatham and Aylesford Parliamentary Constituency ===
Ditton is within the parliamentary constituency of Chatham and Aylesford. Since 4 July 2024 the Member of Parliament has been the Labour party's Tris Osborne. At the 2024 general election, Labour won by a majority of 1,998 with 33.5% of the vote in the constituency. Conservatives won 28.6% of the vote, Reform UK 24.5%, the Green Party 6.1%, and Liberal Democrats 5.3%.

=== Kent County Council ===
There are 84 elected councillors on Kent County Council of whom seven represent Tonbridge & Malling residents. The other members represent the remaining 11 councils in Kent. Tonbridge & Malling borough is divided into six county council divisions with each division having one councillor elected to represent it, except for the Tonbridge division which has two councillors. The county council division of Malling Rural North East includes Aylesford, Burham, Ditton and Wouldham.

=== Tonbridge and Malling Borough Council ===
Tonbridge and Malling Borough Council constituency in Kent.

Ditton is a ward in the Tonbridge and Malling local government borough and has two of the 53 seats on the Council. On 7 May 2015 Ditton residents elected Tom Cannon & Ben Walker to represent them on Tonbridge and Malling Borough Council for 4 years.

=== Ditton Parish Council ===
Created in 1894 as a result of legislation requiring each parish to have its own council, the council presently consists of 13 members and is responsible for a variety aspects of parish life: the general upkeep and maintenance of two recreation grounds, the village green, War Memorial, Community Centre, parish allotments, and (in part) the churchyard. The council also funds floodlights to illuminate the church. A magazine, the Ditton Gazette, is published quarterly and is circulated among the households of the parish. In February 2006, the council was awarded Quality Parish Council status.

== Demography ==
Ditton compared
2011 UK census	Ditton ward	Tonbridge and Malling borough	England
Population	4,786	120,805	53,012,456
Non UK born	5.1%	6.9%	13.8%
White	96%	95.9%	85.5%
Asian	1.7%	1.9%	7.7%
Black	0.6%	0.3%	3.4%
Mixed	1.2%	1.5%	2.2%
Christian	67.5%	63.7%	59.4%
Muslim	0.6%	0.6%	5.0%
Hindu	0.3%	0.4%	1.5%
No religion	24.2%	27.3%	24.7%
Unemployed	2.5%	3.0%	4.4%
Retired	16.9%	14.5%	13.7%

At the 2011 UK census, the Ditton electoral ward had a population of 4,786. The ethnic breakdown was 96% white, 1.2% mixed race, 1.7% Asian, 0.6% black and 0.3% other. The place of birth of residents was 94.8% United Kingdom, 0.4% Republic of Ireland, 1% other 2001 EU member countries, 0.5% later EU accession countries and 3.2% elsewhere. Religion was recorded as 67.5% Christian, 0.3% Buddhist, 0.3% Hindu, 0.1% Sikh and 0.6% Muslim. 24.2% were recorded as having no religion, 0.3% had an alternative religion and 6.7% did not state their religion.

The economic activity of residents aged 16–74 was 43.4% in full-time employment, 15.6% in part-time employment, 9.2% self-employed, 2.5% unemployed, 2.5% students with jobs, 2.7% students without jobs, 16.9% retired, 3.7% looking after home or family, 2.6% permanently sick or disabled and 0.7% economically inactive for other reasons. The main industries for employed residents was 18.5% retail, 11.9% health and social work, 10.4% construction, 8.6% education and 7.9% manufacturing. Compared with national figures, the ward had a relatively high proportion of workers in construction and retail, and a relatively low proportion in hotels and restaurants. Of the ward's residents aged 16–74, 21% had a higher education qualification or the equivalent, compared with 27.4% nationwide.

== Economy ==
The parish of Ditton contains a number of agricultural, small commercial and industrial businesses, marking a historical shift from a farming-based community to a modern, mixed economy.

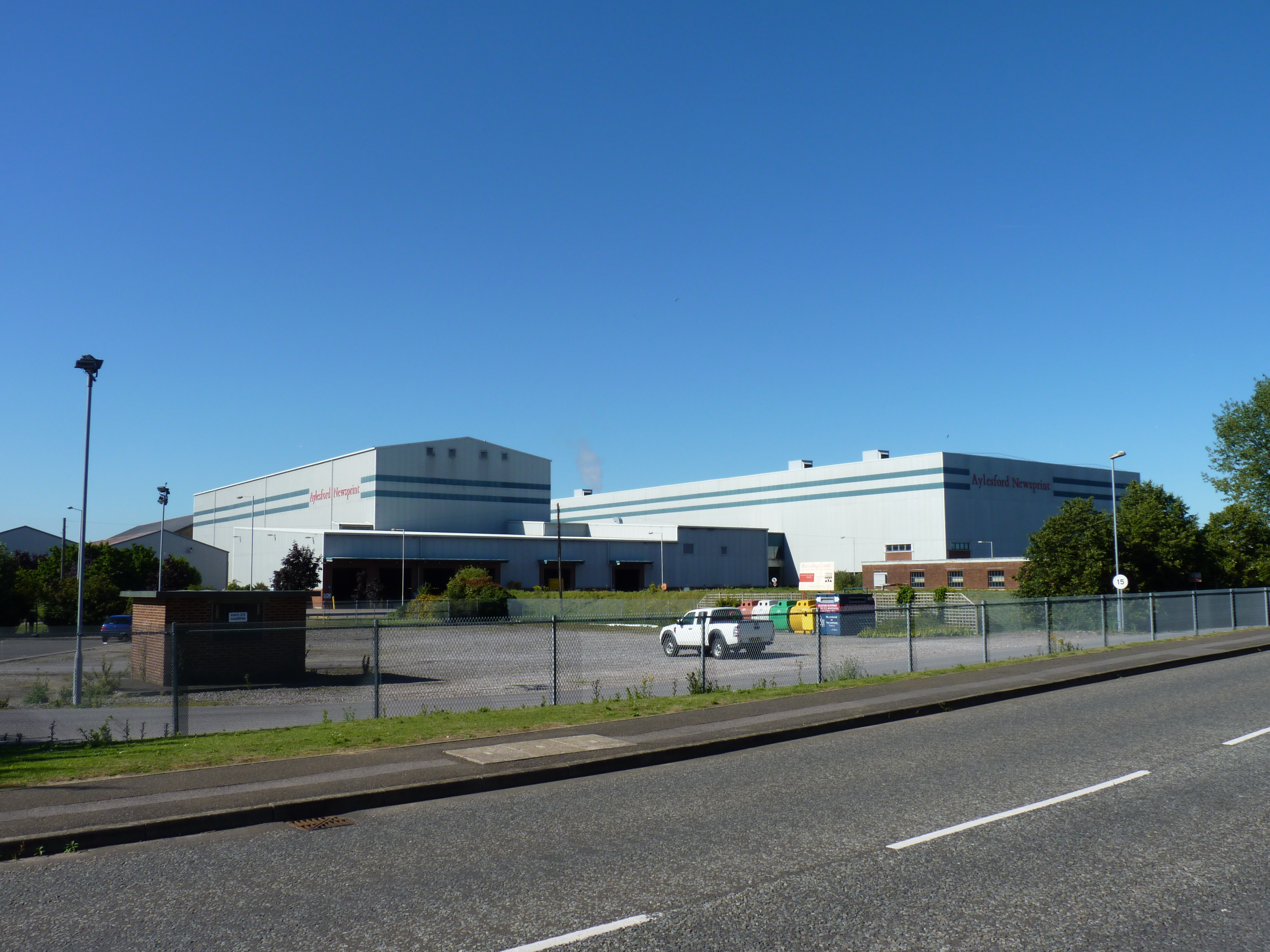
Aylesford Newsprint

The Medway valley has long been associated with papermaking. In February 2015 it was confirmed that the last major paper mill in the parish, Aylesford Newsprint, was to close with the loss of 233 jobs. Ditton's connection with the industry predates 1667, when a paper mill was already established at an ancient settlement known as Coldharbour, which stood at the northern end of the millpond which can still be found - albeit now bisected by the M20 - just to the northeast of Cobdown House. It is very likely that this mill, which by the nineteenth century had become known as Mill Hall Mill, was the earliest paper mill on the lower tributaries of the River Medway. In the modern era, in 1922, Albert E Reed and Company Limited, who already ran two successful paper mills at Tovil, built a large mill on the banks of the River Medway at New Hythe. Reed International became a major paper manufacturer who, at its height, had in the region of 1,500 employees. The business was seriously hampered by the advent of World War II, which caused a shortage of pulp to make newspapers and led to a different material, waste paper, being used in its place. Waste paper was then replaced by recycled fibre, which was fully utilised in the process of producing newsprint. The 60-acre Newsprint plant belonged to SCA, paper manufacturers from Sweden, in partnership with Mondi, and £250 million was invested in developing the site. Aylesford Newsprint was one of the world's leading manufacturers of newsprint, recycling around 500,000 tonnes of material to produce some 400,000 tonnes of final product. Media organisations in Europe, America, and the Far East relied on the recycled newsprint from the plant for their publications. The East Malling Stream, which at one time turned six mills on its short journey to the River Medway, four of them paper mills, was a vital water supply for the processes carried out in the plant.

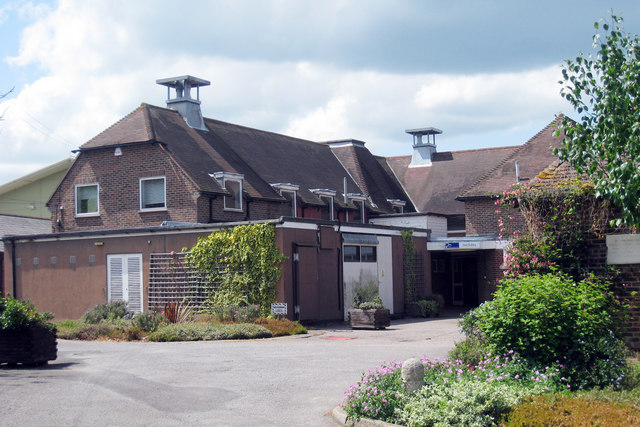
Oast Building at the Research Station – geograph.org.uk – 1314804

At the opposite end of the parish is part of the 580 acre East Malling Research Station. This began in 1913 with 23 acres in response to a need among Kent farmers for assistance with their fruit growing activities. Since fruit was an important part of the Kent economy, the station performed a valuable role is carrying out research experiments and advising farmers on fruit production. The land that forms the research station grounds is conducive to the growing of fruit, with good water retention and drainage properties. The station was also well placed in terms of transport links since the nearby railway connected with London in one direction and the agricultural college at Wye in the other. It was an indication of the importance of the research station that the government and fruit producers were prepared to give financial support for its work. In 1938 the 360-acre Bradbourne House estate was added to the site. As a result of research work carried out on the site, the station established a reputation as a world centre for the research of perennial crops. Horticultural Research International operated the site until 2009 until 1 April 2010, since when the East Malling Trust has owned the research station. The station is fully engaged with local business and contains a lecture hall that can take 200 delegates.

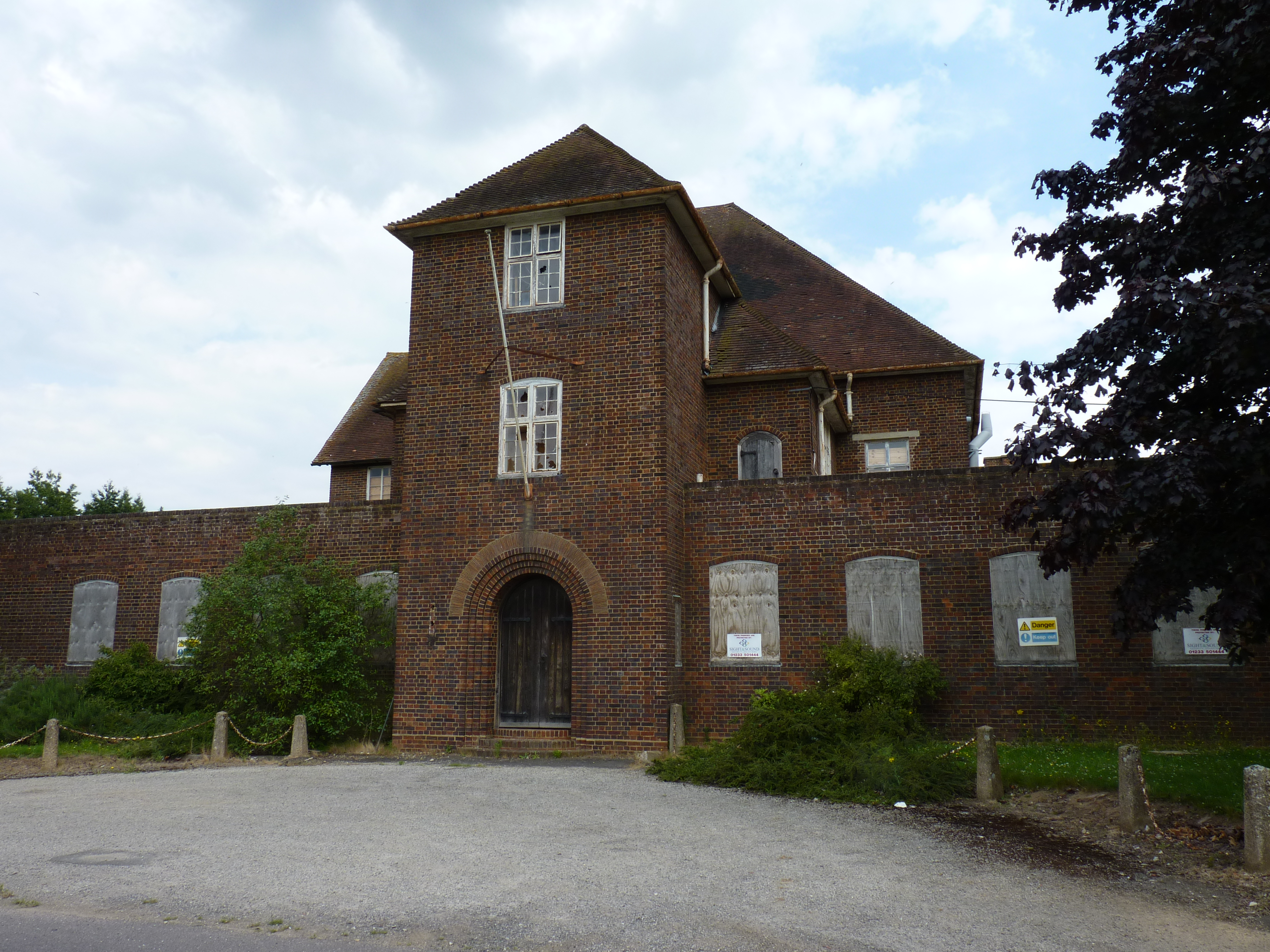
Former Ditton Laboratory on Kiln Barn Lane

The Ditton Laboratory, a short distance from the research station, was opened in 1930 by the Empire Marketing Board as a part of Cambridge University's Low-Temperature Research Station. The purpose of the laboratory was to carry out experiments on the shipping of fruit across the high seas, in order to extend its life over long, seaborne journeys. This led to an experiment being carried out to simulate, as far as was possible, conditions on board a cargo ship, the so-called "ship on land" experiment. One focus of research was the Cox's Orange Pippin Apple, which had the reputation of being a problematic fruit to transport over long distances. In 1969 the laboratory was incorporated into the East Malling Research Station as the fruit storage section. After the building was boarded up, a fish farm and fruit distribution business continued at its rear. It has since been demolished and replaced by a modern housing estate.

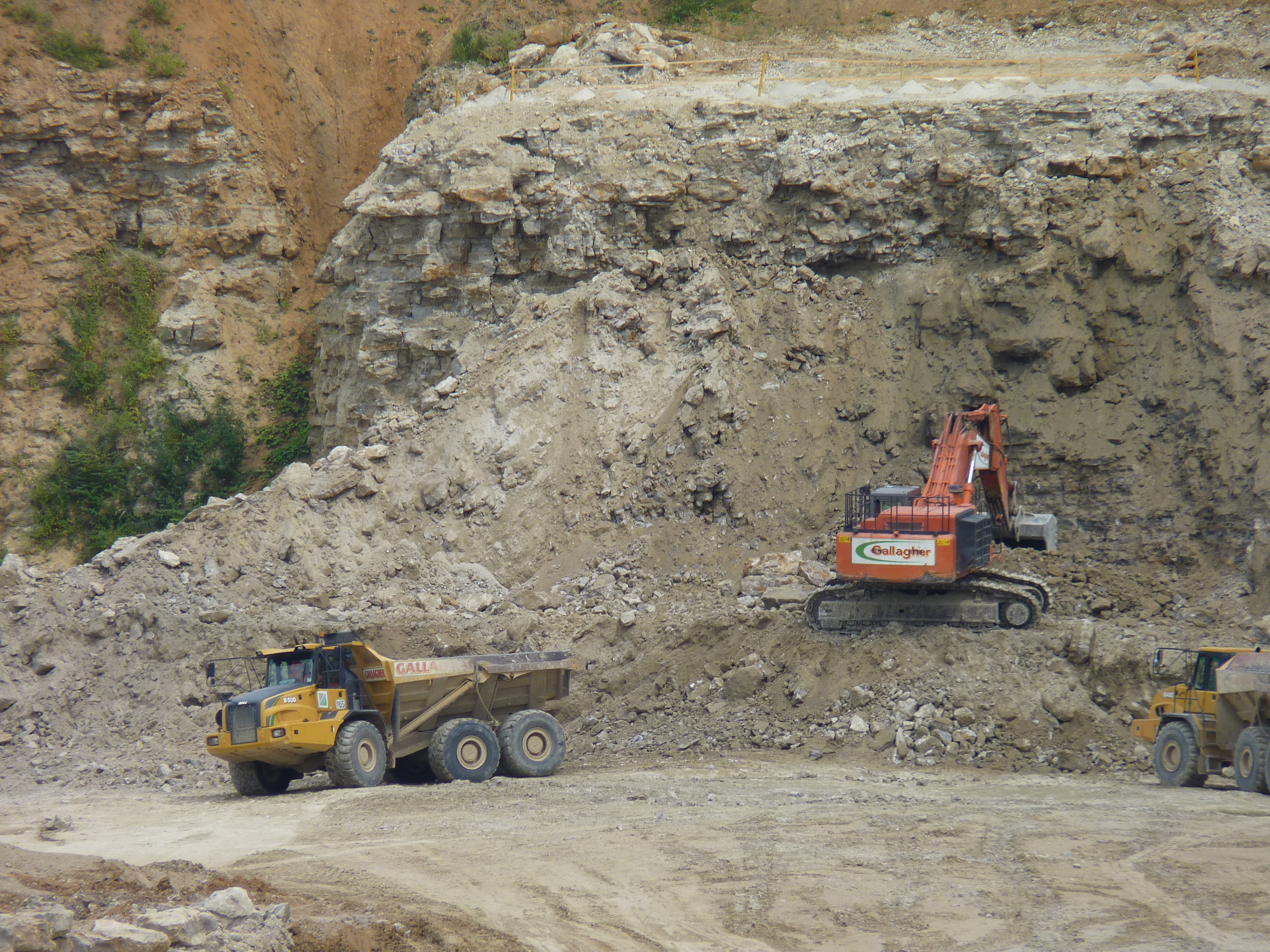
Hermitage Quarry

Quarrying for ragstone is still an important local industry. Gallagher Aggregates Limited operate the Hermitage Quarry, which is situated 1.5 kilometres (0.93 mi) to the south of Ditton village. About 50 employees work in the quarry and another 60 on subsidiary functions. According to the firm's estimates, there is only enough ragstone left in the quarry for another four years' quarrying, with the result that new sources of production are being sought. Ragstone in an important material the construction industry for roads and buildings.

In 2011 Gallagher Aggregated applied to extend the Hermitage Quarry into Oaken Wood in the parish of Ditton. The planning committee of Kent County Council granted permission for quarrying in part of the woodland, but the decision was referred to the Secretary of State. Planning committee chairman Richard King said that "local residents and environmental groups have argued that the loss of irreplaceable ancient woodland and impact on the local wildlife site is unacceptable. On balance, however, members felt the job prospects and the economic need for ragstone to support construction in the county in future, and benefits of the project outweighed these objections." The application was subsequently approved on appeal by the communities secretary, Eric Pickles, who observed that the economic benefits of being able to produce more ragstone and crushed rock from the site outweighed the loss of the wood.

Ditton is five miles from the centre of the county town of Maidstone, which is an important source of employment in the area.

== Travel links ==
Many bus services pass through Ditton. There are two main frequent and reliable routes provided by Arriva Southern Counties.

The 71 Arriva service between Snodland and Maidstone Town Centre (via Allington) passes through Ditton every 10 minutes (Monday - Saturday) and every 30 minutes (Sunday). The sister 72 Arriva service between Kings Hill and Maidstone Town Centre also passes through Ditton every 30 minutes (Monday - Saturday).

The 703 Arriva service between Maidstone Town Centre and Bluewater Shopping Centre in Greenhithe, Dartford also passes through Ditton however this is an intermittent service that runs three times a day (Monday - Friday).

The nearest railway stations are at Aylesford and East Malling..

== Ditton Nature Reserve ==
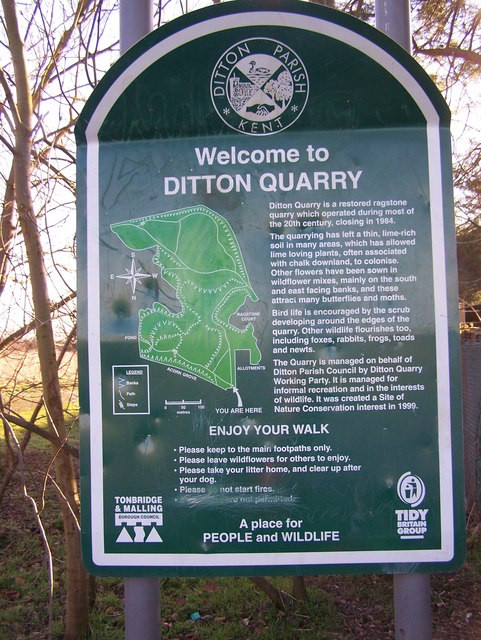
Ditton Quarry Sign – geograph.org.uk – 1118063

Since 31 May 2009 Ditton has had an officially recognised nature reserve, Ditton Quarry off Kilnbarn Road. Natural England declared it a Local Nature Reserve after a partnership had been formed between Ditton Parish Council, residents, and Tonbridge and Malling Borough Council.

Many ragstone quarries have been abandoned and backfilled once exhausted. When Ditton Quarry closed down in 1984, quarrying operations had left behind a legacy of a lime-rich soil which formed the foundation of a thriving habitat for plants and wildlife; 140 wildflowers (including five that are rare in Kent), 18 butterfly species, and 50 bird species have been recorded. It is also home to foxes, rabbits, frogs, toads and newts. The quarry is now a Site of Nature Conservation Importance (SNCI). Public access is free.

The quarry is also a prime location for geological research and provides opportunities for field studies in a variety of disciplines: sedimentology, stratigraphy, palaeontology, geography, and industrial archaeology. Several features make this a unique location for the study of rock formations. Visitors can examine the extensively exposed rock faces, primarily Kentish Ragstone and Hassock facies, and study changes in vertical and lateral facies. The facies are glauconitic with some horizons of silicification. Shell debris (ammonites, belemnites, nautiloids, bivalves, etc.) and bioturbation are also present. The quarry could be important for future research via gamma ray profiling of the rock beds in relation to changes in sea level and climate.

== Social and leisure activities ==
=== Open spaces ===
Ditton has various urban open spaces: the New Road 4-acre (16,000 m^{2}) recreation ground was acquired in 1954 and a second one measuring 11 acres (45,000 m^{2}) was provided in the early 1970s, just prior to the building of the community centre (see Ditton Community Centre). A further 18 acres (73,000 m^{2}) of recreational land was handed to the parish in 1991 following the cessation of quarrying at Ditton Court Quarry (see Ditton Nature Reserve). A small section of the land has been leased to Ditton Bowls Club who, with Sports Council grants and loans from the parish council, has provided a thriving member's club with a well kept green, looked after by parish council staff. The club has recently added a pavilion for use by its members.

=== Ditton Parish ===
Play areas for children and young people:

- Kiln Barn Play & Petanque Area
- Ball Court, Kiln Barn Road

Outdoor Sports Facilities:

- Kilnbarn Recreation Ground
- New Road Recreation Ground
- Ditton Church of England Junior School
- Cobdown Park & Sportsground
- Cobdown Park Bowling Green

Outdoor Sports Facilities continued:

- Ditton Bowls Club
- Cobdown Croquet Lawn
- Cobdown Tennis Courts

Amenity Green Spaces:

- Village Green, New Road

Natural and Semi-Natural Green Spaces:

- Ditton Court Quarry
- Nature Area, Bradbourne Lane

=== Ditton Community Centre ===
In 1973 Ian Lavender (Pte. Pike of "Dads' Army") opened the centre, which was subsequently extended. Providing an important focal point for the local community, the centre has a hall capacity of up to 400 people. Other rooms include a meetings room and a functions room (up to 100 people). Activities throughout the week include: a playgroup & toddler club, keep fit class, badminton, table tennis and indoor bowls on weekdays; discos, dances, roller skating, indoor tennis and craft markets at the weekend. The centre also provides for sporting activities in its grounds: two tennis courts, two football pitches and a cricket pitch. There are showers and changing rooms inside the building. The centre is owned by Ditton Parish Council which holds regular meetings there.

=== Cobdown Park ===
The former Reed International Sports and Social Club set within the grounds of Cobdown Park. Was acquired in June 2024, by London City Lionesses as their new training facilities. The park has been used for sports since 1931 and has always been privately owned and operated, having been previously connected to the former members social clubs of Aylesford Newsprint part of Reed International a once major paper manufacturer in the area whose parent company KPMG appointed administrators on 24 February 2015 closing with over 233 jobs lost. On 26 September 2025, it was announced that the club's permanent training ground at Cobdown Park had received full planning permission from Tonbridge and Malling borough council in a unanimous vote of their planning committee.

=== Kentish Quarryman ===
In 2008 the Kentish Quarryman Public House, which was the former Ditton Working Men's Club located on the western side of New Road, was opened. The house took its name from the historic connection of the parish with ragstone quarrying, which is acknowledged by a large slab of ragstone at its front entrance (see photograph).

=== World Custard Pie Throwing Championship ===
In the 1980s, Ditton was home to the World Custard Pie Throwing Championship, after Councillor Mike Fitzgerald, who founded the championships, moved to Ditton from Coxheath, bringing the championships with him. Although the competition died out in 1988, it was revived at Coxheath in 2007, and it has been held there annually since then.
