= John Young Stratton =

The Reverend John Young Stratton
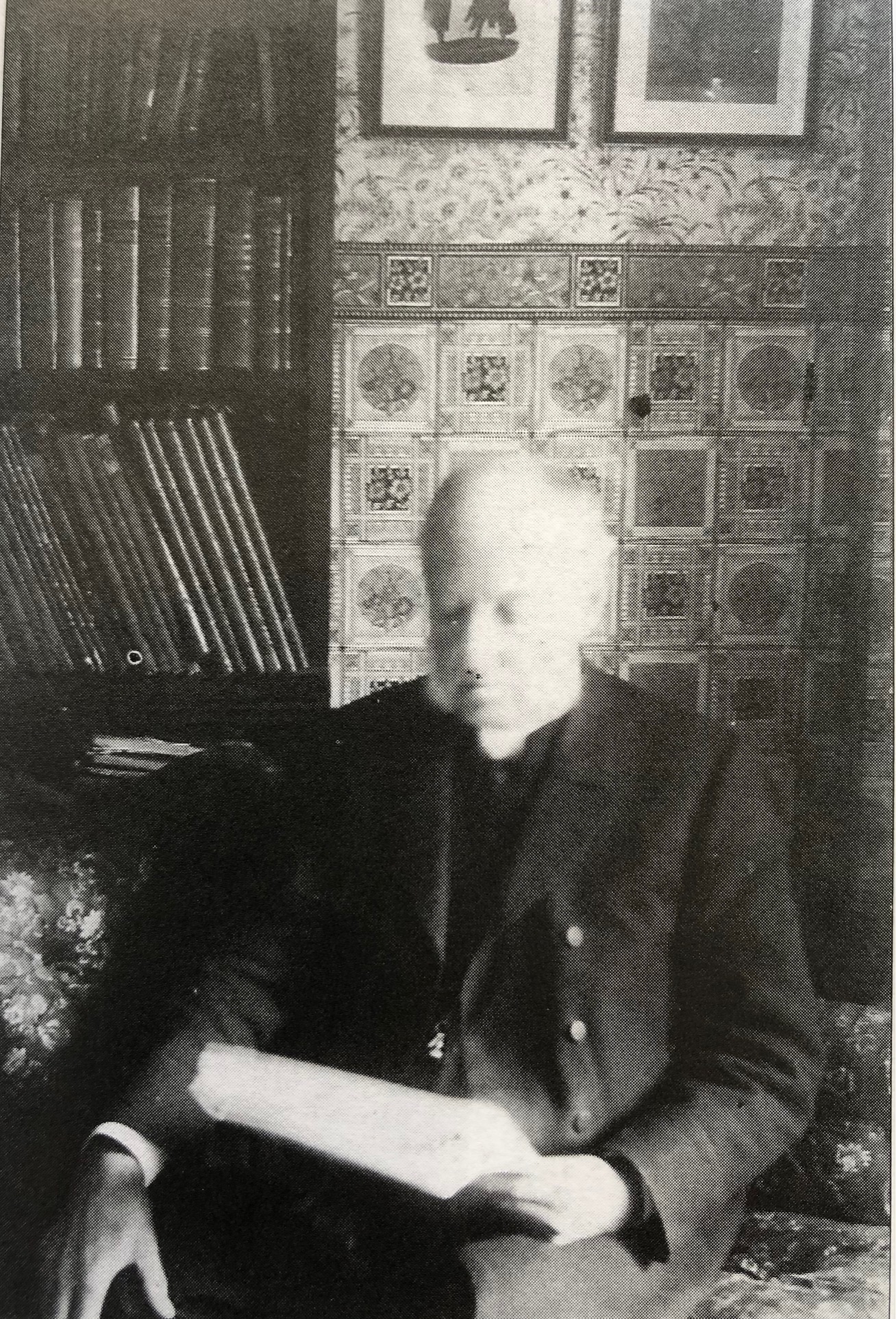

Rector of Ditton
- In office 1856–1905
- Preceded by: William Hamilton Burroughs
- Succeeded by: Howard Aylwin

Personal details
- Born: 1829/30 Boughton, Norfolk
- Died: 30 March 1905 (aged 75) Maidstone, Kent
- Education: Magdalene College, Cambridge

John Young Stratton (1829 or 1830 – 30 March 1905) was an English Anglican clergyman, writer and social reformer. He served as rector of Ditton, Kent from 1856 until his death. He campaigned alongside other reformers to improve living conditions for seasonal hop-pickers and was involved in the establishment of the Society for Employment and Improved Lodgings for Hop Pickers in 1866. He also wrote on rural poverty and the Poor Law, advocated reform of friendly societies, and proposed a system of insurance for wage-paid workers through the General Post Office.

== Early life, education and family ==
John Young Stratton was born in Boughton, Norfolk, in 1829 or 1830. His father, the Reverend William Stratton, was appointed to the perpetual curacy of Gressingham, Lancashire, in 1838. Stratton was educated at Heversham Grammar School in Westmorland and Magdalene College, Cambridge, graduating BA in 1853.

Stratton was ordained deacon in 1853 and priest in 1855. Parish registers record his service as curate at Gressingham during the 1850s. He was appointed Rector of Ditton, Kent, in 1856.

In 1870, Stratton married Anne Louisa Taylor of Boughton Monchelsea Place. They had six children.

In 1876, Stratton purchased the Ditton Place estate from Septimus Maitland. He subsequently rented out the mansion and farmland and sold plots of land for development.

== Rural poverty ==
In 1864, Stratton published "The Life of a Farm Labourer" in The Cornhill Magazine, criticising the Poor Law for what he considered its tendency to undermine independence among agricultural labourers. Historian Mark Freeman has characterised Stratton's portrayal of agricultural labourers as largely unsympathetic, noting his emphasis on institutional reform as a prerequisite for their moral improvement.

In 1868, Stratton published a pamphlet proposing reforms to friendly societies and a system of insurance for wage-paid workers through the Post Office.

In 1870, the Journal of the Royal Agricultural Society of England published his essay, "Farm Labourers, their Friendly Societies, and the Poor Law". Stratton argued that the administration of poor relief discouraged saving and self-reliance, although he accepted that assistance could be justified in cases of exceptional hardship. He advocated greater scrutiny of benefit societies and proposed government-supervised insurance providing sickness and burial benefits, with the option of an old-age annuity. Contributions would be collected through local post offices.

== Hop-pickers ==
Stratton campaigned to improve conditions for seasonal hop-pickers in Kent. Before mechanisation, the harvest required a large workforce, drawn initially from itinerant labourers and members of Romany Gypsy and Irish Traveller communities and, increasingly from the mid-nineteenth century, working-class families from London. Women and children often travelled ahead of the men, who joined them at weekends, and many families returned to the same farms annually. By the 1870s, the South Eastern Railway was running special trains to carry hop-pickers from London to Kent.

Accommodation varied, but workers were sometimes housed in overcrowded tents, barns, stables and other farm buildings, often without adequate sanitation. In September 1849, an outbreak of cholera among hop-pickers at East Farleigh, Kent, caused numerous deaths. A study published by the Kent Archaeological Society records 45 fatalities, of whom 43 were buried in the parish churchyard. During the 1860s, Stratton and the Reverend Joseph James Kendon campaigned to improve conditions for hop-pickers. In 1866, the Society for Employment and Improved Lodgings for Hop Pickers was formed.

Although the society attracted support from prominent public figures, it initially struggled to persuade hop-growers to improve accommodation for seasonal workers. It established a labour agency through which growers could obtain hop-pickers, subject to conditions intended to improve accommodation and regulate workers' conduct. The society could refuse to supply labour to growers who failed to meet its requirements. Growers paid an agency fee of threepence for each picker supplied.

The agency met with limited success. In his 1883 account, Stratton reported that it had never supplied more than 1,900 hop-pickers in a single year, with numbers generally below 1,000. Insufficient support from growers eventually led the society to discontinue its own agency operations and transfer the work to an agency in London's Covent Garden.

== Hopper huts ==
Purpose-built hopper huts gradually replaced some of the tents and farm buildings previously used to accommodate seasonal hop-pickers. Early huts were constructed of timber, with brick also being used later in the nineteenth century. Usually arranged in rows or blocks, they provided basic accommodation, often with earth floors. Water supplies, toilets and separate cookhouses were introduced gradually rather than being standard features from the outset.

Section 45 of the Sanitary Law Amendment Act 1874 empowered local sanitary authorities to make byelaws regulating the accommodation and treatment of hop-pickers, subject to confirmation by the Local Government Board. According to Historic England, the first such byelaws were adopted at Bromley, Kent, with other districts subsequently introducing similar provisions.

In 1883, Stratton published Hops and Hop-Pickers, an account of the hop industry and the conditions experienced by its seasonal workforce.

== Later years and death ==
Alongside his parish duties, Stratton served as secretary of the Kent Friendly Society and the Church of England Mission Association for hop-pickers. He remained Rector of Ditton until his death in 1905.

Stratton died in Maidstone on 30 March 1905, aged 75. A notice in The Times announced that his funeral would take place at Ditton Church on 3 April. His obituary in the Kent and Sussex Courier described him as "probably the best known clergyman in Mid-Kent" and "the Hoppers' friend".
