= East Malling Stream =

River in Kent, England

- Map of Kent Town Rivers

Physical characteristics
- Source
  - location: East Malling
  - coordinates: 51.2838°N 0.4293°E
- Mouth
  - location: River Medway

The East Malling Stream, known locally as "The Stream", rises at Well Street, East Malling, Kent, and flows in a generally easterly direction to join the River Medway at Mill Hall, Aylesford. It powered six watermills. The stream may have formerly been known as the Bradbourne, Bradbourne Lane in Ditton bearing witness to this name.

== Watermills ==
The Domesday Book recorded two mills worth 10/- at Metlinge (East Malling). In 1363 there were two mills in the village. East Malling possessed a fulling mill from 1567 to 1719, most likely to have been Middle Mill. Thomas Tomlyn was a miller in the 17th century, Thomas Pidgeon, corn miller of East Malling died in 1685, In 1706 there were three mills - Upper, Weir and Middle Mills. The history of the paper mills needs to be read together, as they were all linked through various owners.

=== Upper Mill, East Malling. ===
TQ 697 571 51°17′16″N 0°26′05″E

James Brooks was at the mill in 1752, when the mill was rated at £61, increasing to £122 in 1757. By 1764 the mill was operating as a paper mill, James Brooks insuring the mill for £150 in that year. One of his apprentices was Nicholas Tapsfield, who was later to work at the paper mill at Sundridge. In 1801 he insured the mill for £350 and died in 1805 aged 69. John Larking took the mill 1n 1806, it being then rated at £131. Larking went into partnership with John Morrice by 1816 and Morrice was recorded as being at the mill from 1817 to 1821. He was succeeded by William Blunden, who was working at Upper Mill in 1819, followed by Robert Tassell c.1823. The mill underwent considerable development between 1840 and 1860. It was demolished in the years between the First and Second World Wars. An illustration of Upper Mill can be seen here.

The mill pond was some 200 yards (180 m) long, and covered an area of just over ½ acre in 1840. The mill had an overshot waterwheel of some 10 feet (3.05 m) diameter and 8 feet (2.44 m) wide, the remains of which were on site in 1972. The tail race discharged into the mill pond of Weir Mill.

=== Weir Mill, East Malling. ===
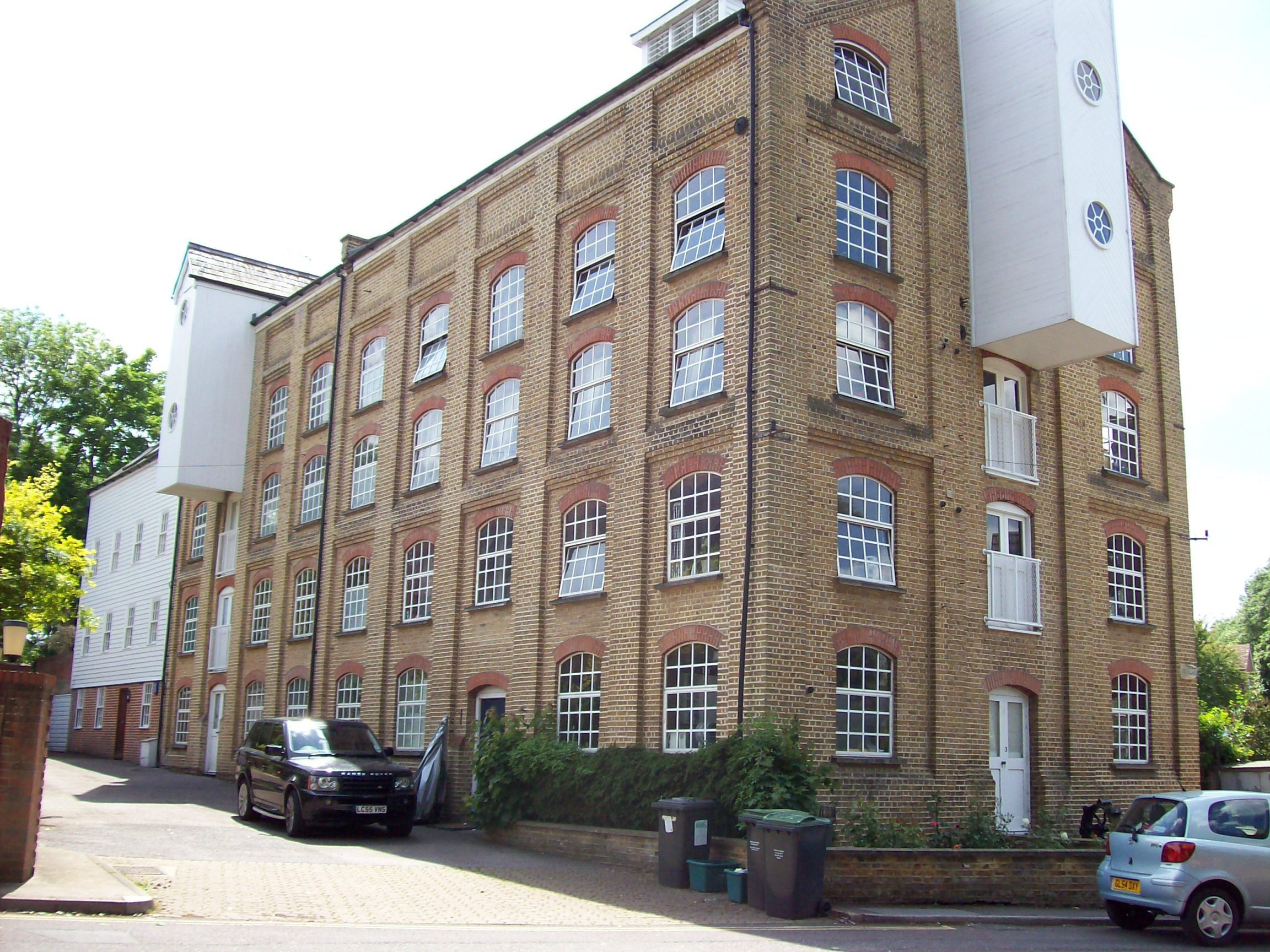
The converted mill

TQ 698 572 51°17′19″N 0°26′10″E

Probably one of the two Domesday mills. The mill was marked on a map of 1706. The next known mention of Weir Mill was in 1810 when the mill was marked on the map accompanying the enclosure award. In 1840 James Phillips was the owner-occupier of the mill, which was a water corn mill with 12 feet (3.66 m) waterwheel driving two pairs of stones. The pond of Weir Mill is roughly square in shape and covers an area of just over ¼ acre. The mill passed from James to Thomas Phillips c.1855 and to Mr. T J Dewe c,1893. G E Hide was working the mill in 1905 and S R Anscombe bought the mill in 1913. The mill last ground corn in 1950 although for the latter years the product produced was not flour but animal feed. The mill and was bought by Whitbread Ltd., the Wateringbury brewers, who used part of the mill to store hops. The mill subsequently passed into the ownership of Wm. Lillico & Son and was then used as a general store. During this time the timber part of the mill buildings were becoming derelict.

The surviving mill building

The timber clad original mill building dates from the reign of Queen Anne. A brick extension was added in two stages, the last part being built in 1889. Roller mills of 4½ sack capacity were installed c.1893 as was a boiler and steam engine, principally to drive the roller mills whilst the waterwheel drove the stones. The steam engine was a beam engine, it was eventually sold to a buyer in the USA.

The wooden mill

This is four storeys in height, the base being of brick and the upper storeys timber. The 12 feet (3.66 m) diameter waterwheel was overshot with eighty buckets and carried on a 9 inches (230 mm) diameter cast iron axle. The wooden upright shaft was only 6 inches (150 mm) diameter, reducing to 4 inches (100 mm) at first floor level. It carried a Great Spur Wheel and an iron Crown Wheel of 6 feet (1.83 m) diameter. This received a drive from the steam engine so that the mill could be driven that way if necessary. The mill drove three pairs of millstones.

The brick mill

This was built in two parts, latterly known as the "middle room" and the "end room", this last part being built in 1889. The mill was some six storeys in height, dwarfing the original mill. The middle room contained the roller mills, six in total.

=== Middle Mill, East Malling. ===
TQ 696 574 51°17′25″N 0°26′00″E

Probably one of the two Domesday mills. Middle Mill was in existence in 1684 when the pond was shown on a map drawn by Abraham Walter. In 1755 Richard Gowlett was the papermaker here, and in that year he took John Evernden and Elizabeth Sands as apprentices. He insured the mill for £35 in 1770 and he died c.1778, his widow Mary paying the rates on the mill until 1798 when the mill was sold to George Blunden. William Blunden was at the mill in 1816, but George Blunden was again recorded at the mill in 1824. He was recorded at a manufacturer of brown and white paper in 1832 and Francis Collins joined him in partnership that year. Robert Tassell acquired the mill c.1833 and went into partnership with Henry Smith in 1838. In 1841 there was an increase in the rateable value of the property from £54 to £150. The partnership was dissolved in 1848, all three mills being in the sole ownership of Robert Tassell from 1834 to 1838. The mill stood empty from 1848 to 1850, when the Busbridge brothers took over the running of the mills. They were involved in a Court case in 1859 over the discharge of foul water used in the paper making process. The mill pond covered an area of just over one-half acre. An illustration of Middle Mill can be seen here.

=== Lower Mill, East Malling. ===
TQ 697 576 51°17′32″N 0°26′05″E

In 1792 Clement and George Taylor were granted a patent for the use of chlorine for bleaching rags for use in paper manufacture. James Whatman claimed that he was able to prove that several trials had already been made, including by Mr. Larking, who owned Lower Mill at that time. In 1816, John Larking and John Morrice were in partnership at both Upper and Lower Mills, the partnership being dissolved on 8 October of that year, John Morrice taking both mills. Robert Tassell took both mills by 1821, making both brown and white papers. He went into partnership with Henry Smith in 1838 and by 1844 they owned all three paper mills. This partnership was dissolved c.1844 and Henry Smith was the sole occupier of the three mills, worth together £420. In 1848 Lower Mill was recorded as empty and valued at £120. All three mills were managed by Thomas Harris Busbridge and George Frederick Busbridge from c.1849. It is likely that Lower Mill ceased regular production of paper in 1848, being used spasmodically until 1851, and closing completely by 1852. The mill seems to have been demolished by 1860, not appearing on the first 25-inch Ordnance Survey map. The mill pond is some 200 yards (180 m) long and 50 yards (46 m) wide, covering an area of just under 1½ acres (6,100 m^{2}).

=== Church Mills, Ditton. ===
TQ 709 582 51°17′50″N 0°27′08″E

A Domesday site, one mill was recorded at Dictvne (Ditton) with a value of 10/-. Tenants of this corn mill include Edward Smith in 1724, J Whiteing from 1725 to 1743, Thomas Shepard 1744–54, his widow in 1755–6, William Luck in 1757. Thomas Allchin was at the mill in 1840 and was still there in 1852. Joseph Jellis was the miller in 1887-90 and Robert Foster was the last known miller in 1905. The mill closed down c.1912. The mill is located close to the ford in Bradbourne Lane. In its later years the waterwheel was replaced by a turbine.

=== Mill Hall Mill, Aylesford. ===
TQ 715 589 51°18′12″N 0°27′41″E

This mill was marked on a map of 1684, it was a paper mill at that time. In 1695 Edward Middleton was working the mill, which then had a rateable value of £20. He was at the mill until 1724 when William Harris took it over. William Harris died in 1741 and his widow ran the mill until 1744 when Thomas Harris took it over. He was still at the mill in 1763 when he insured the mill for £100. in 1776 Thomas Golding insured the mill. He was still at the mill in 1803 but by 1812 his son Stephen Golding was recorded as a master paper maker of Ditton when he married. There was a partnership between Thomas Golding and his sons Stephen and Thomas jr which was dissolved in 1816. The artist Jean Claude Natteas (1785–1822) sketched the mill in 1816. In 1832, Robert Tassell took over the mill and it ceased to make paper by 1841. In 1841, Stephen Spratt was recorded as the occupier of the mill, by then a corn mill. he was at the mill until at least 1862. In the 1871 census the miller was Henry Stonham who lived there with his wife Rebecca and brother Charles, also a miller. However, in the 1881 census brother Charles is shown as the miller living there with his wife and family. In 1878 the owner is still Charles Stoham and sons. A steam engine was recorded at the mill in 1887, but had gone by 1890, when Walter Skinner was the miller, still there in 1895. Henry Packham was the last miller, there at least 1905–13, but the mill had stopped working by 1922. The machinery was removed and the building converted into stables by A E Reed & Co. Ltd. the mill was demolished c.1950 but the waterwheel survived until 1969.

The mill was of three storeys, the base being of ragstone and the upper storeys of timber, clad in tarred weatherboarding. The overshot waterwheel was 14 feet (4.27 m) diameter and 6 feet (1.83 m) wide, mounted on a 9 inches (230 mm) square iron axle, driving an iron pit wheel. The iron pentrough was dated 1887. The final remains of Mill Hall Mill were demolished to make way for the foundations of a footbridge over the M20.

== Ford ==
TQ 708 579 51°17′40″N 0°27′03″E

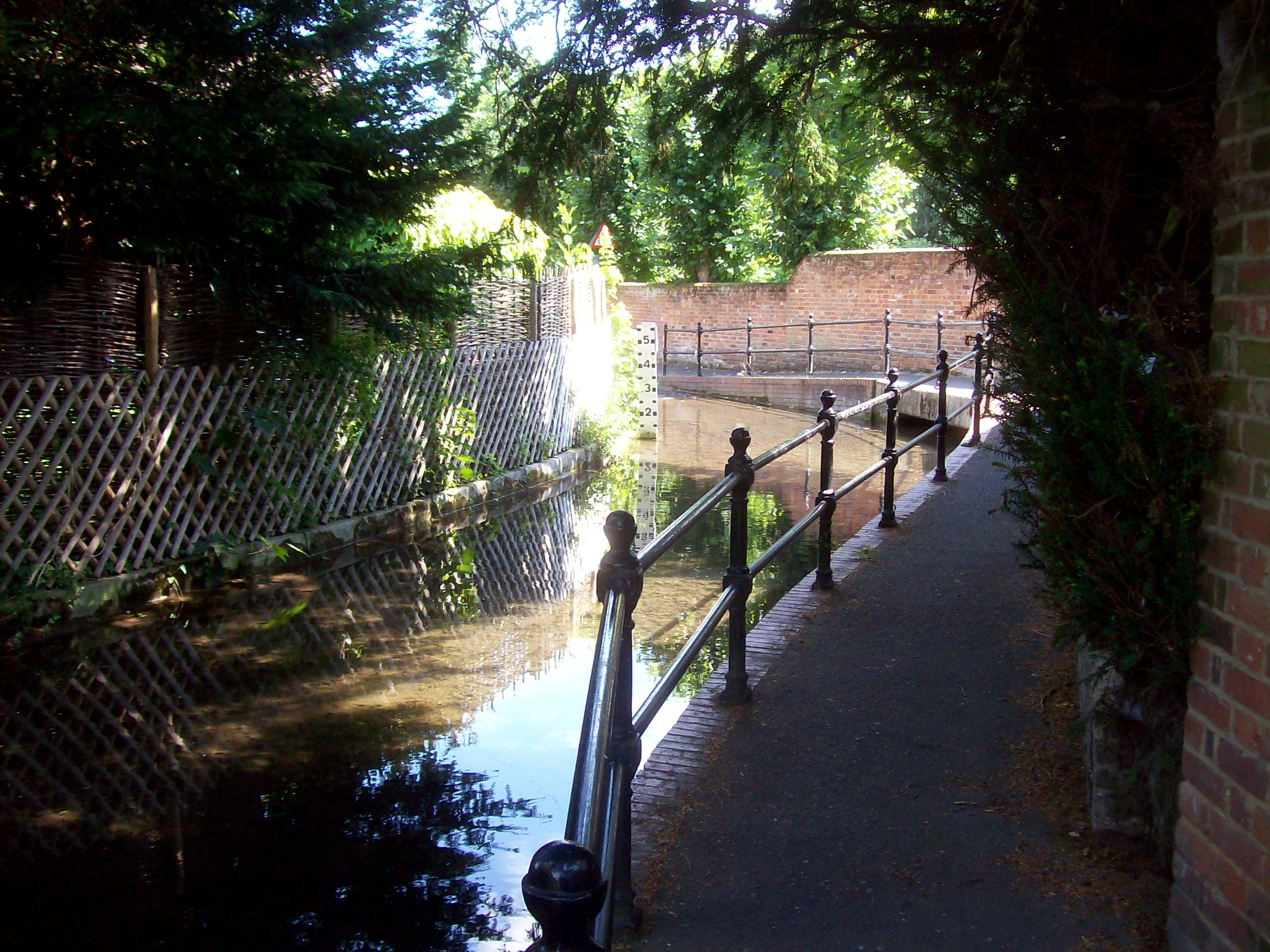
The ford

As mentioned under Church Mills, there is a ford on Bradbourne Lane. In recent years Kent County Council have attempted to close the road through the ford without going through the correct legal channels.

== See also ==
Medway watermills article.
