= Ditton Quarry =

Park in Kent, United Kingdom

Coordinates: 51.291°N 0.458°E

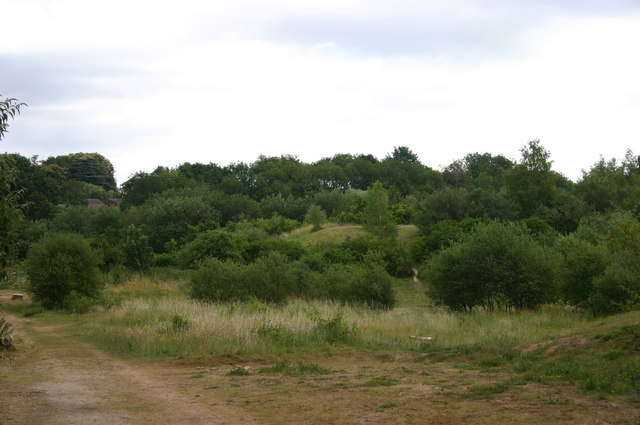
- Interactive map of Ditton Quarry
- Type: Local Nature Reserve
- Location: Maidstone, Kent
- OS grid: TQ 715 575
- Area: 5.6 hectares (14 acres)
- Manager: Ditton Parish Council

Ditton Quarry is a 5.6-hectare (14-acre) Local Nature Reserve in Ditton, on the north-western outskirts of Maidstone in Kent. It is owned and managed by Ditton Parish Council.

This former quarry has grassland and scrub, with diverse fauna including butterflies, foxes, rabbits, frogs, toads and newts. The meadow is rich in wild flowers.

There is access from Kiln Barn Road
