= Hopper hut =

Form of housing at hop harvest

A hopper hut was a form of temporary accommodation provided for hop-pickers on English farms in the 19th and 20th centuries.

== Background ==
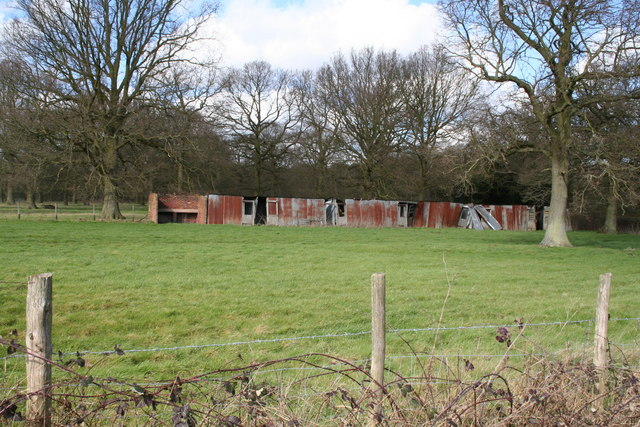
Hopper huts at Grange Farm, Tonbridge

Before the days of mechanised farming, hop picking was a labour-intensive process, requiring a vastly greater number of people than were available locally. Whole families (including children who could have been at school) from London, particularly the south-east and east of London, would leave their homes and spend their time working in the Wealden hop-fields of Kent, Sussex, Surrey and Hampshire. The work was done mostly by women and children, with men joining in on the work during the weekends. By the 1870s, the South Eastern Railway and the London Chatham and Dover Railway were running Hop Pickers' Specials to transport Londoners to the towns and villages at the start of the season. Similar trains were run to serve the pickers in Herefordshire and Worcestershire. An estimated 250,000 hop pickers from London were travelling to Kent by the early twentieth century. In Hampshire, some workers came from the Portsmouth, Southampton and Salisbury areas. Hopper huts were also provided in Herefordshire and Worcestershire. Workers in these two counties would come from the Black Country or South Wales. The miners from South Wales remained at home and carried on working at their pits. Accommodation in the early Victorian period would be in barns, stables, cattle sheds, pigsties, tents or the roof space of buildings. This led to problems with hygiene and therefore health. An outbreak of cholera killed 43 hop-pickers at East Farleigh in September 1849.

In 1865, the Rev J Y Stratton began a campaign to improve the conditions of the hop-pickers. Also during the 1860s, the Rev J J Kendon, visiting Goudhurst, was appalled at the plight of the hop pickers and began campaigning for improvements. This led to the formation of the Society for Employment and Improved Lodgings for Hop Pickers in 1866. The first bylaws covering hop-pickers' accommodation were adopted at Bromley in Kent under the Sanitary Acts Amendment Act, 1874. Kendon made his headquarters at Curtisden Green and by 1889 had a team of over a dozen missionaries.

In 1898, Father Richard Wilson, a priest from Stepney, London, became curious as to what his parishioners did when they disappeared. He persuaded one family to take him with them. He too was appalled by the conditions the pickers had to live in, but would go with them each year, gradually gaining their trust. From 1897 he rented a cottage at Five Oak Green for 2s.6d a week, furnishing it with cots and providing a nurse. Thus, the Little Hoppers Hospital was born. It was very busy that year, as there was an outbreak of smallpox. A few years later, he was able to rent a larger cottage. By 1906 most of the districts of Kent had laws to similar effect, and many farms had hopper huts by 1914. In 1910, Wilson bought the Rose and Crown public house in Five Oak Green and turned the building into the Hoppers' Hospital which provided free medical care for hop pickers as well as social activities including singing, dancing and film shows as an alternative to drinking in local pubs. The building bore the legend "E and H Kelsey's Fine Ales, Stout and Porter Sold Here" over three lines, to which Wilson added the word "not" before the last two words. This Hoppers Hospital was in operation for over 60 years and the historic grade II listed building is still owned by the Stepney-based charity founded at Wilson's church, the Red House and used for holidays by groups from East London. The Salvation Army also used to visit the hop pickers in the fields and attend to their welfare. There was also a Hoppers Hospital at Marden, which was not connected with the one at Five Oak Green.

== Construction ==
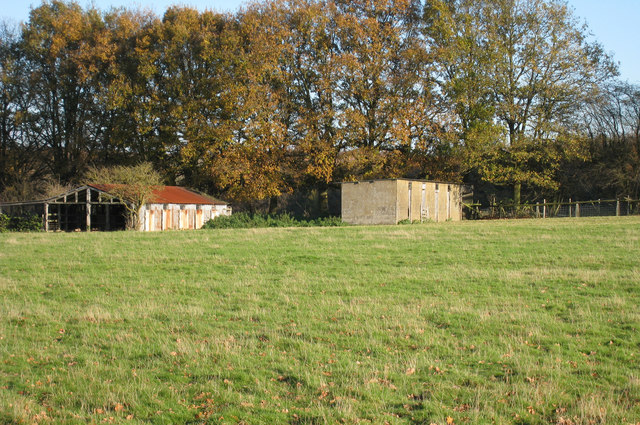
Hopper huts at Goudhurst

The standard size of a hopper hut was either 9 feet (2.74 m) by 9 feet (2.74 m) or 8 feet (2.44 m) by 10 feet (3.05 m), though some were as large as 14 feet (4.27 m) by 14 feet (4.27 m). Early huts were of timber, and during the latter half of the 19th century corrugated iron sheets were used to clad them. Following the abolition of the brick tax in 1850, brick huts were built. Exterior walls were 9 inches (230 mm) thick and partitions between individual huts 4½" (115mm) thick. During the 1930s and 1940s, some hopper huts were built of 18 inches (460 mm) by 9 inches (230 mm) breeze blocks, these being cheap and plentiful after the end of the war. A few huts were made from pre-cast concrete at this time. Nissen Huts were also used as accommodation for hop-pickers.

The huts generally had an earth floor, and were lit by either candles or paraffin lamps. Water would be via a standpipe which had to be within 150 yards (140 m) and sanitation provided by a dedicated toilet block, usually with an earth closet. There would generally be a dedicated cookhouse which the hop-pickers would use to prepare their meals. It was generally discouraged by the farmers for the pickers to have fires in their huts. A few brick built huts were provided with custom built fireplaces and chimneys. The interior of the huts was generally limewashed or distempered.

The furniture within the huts was provided by the pickers. Only very basic bedding was provided - hay and ferns, faggots and straw, then faggots and a palliasse. Some pickers built themselves basic beds of scrap timber with a palliasse. In the late 1940s and 1950s ex-army steel frame beds were used.

== George Orwell ==
George Orwell tried his hand at hop-picking at Blest's Farm, somewhere near West Malling, in September 1931, travelling down from London disguised as a tramp. He spent his time living in a hopper hut made of tin (corrugated iron), thus discovering that fruit and hop picking was not quite the idyllic life described by many scholars and writers of the time. Orwell earned 9/- in a week, and observed that a family of travelers who had picked every year since birth earned 14/- each. His account was published in A Clergyman's Daughter in 1935.

== Survival, conversion, preservation and re-creation ==
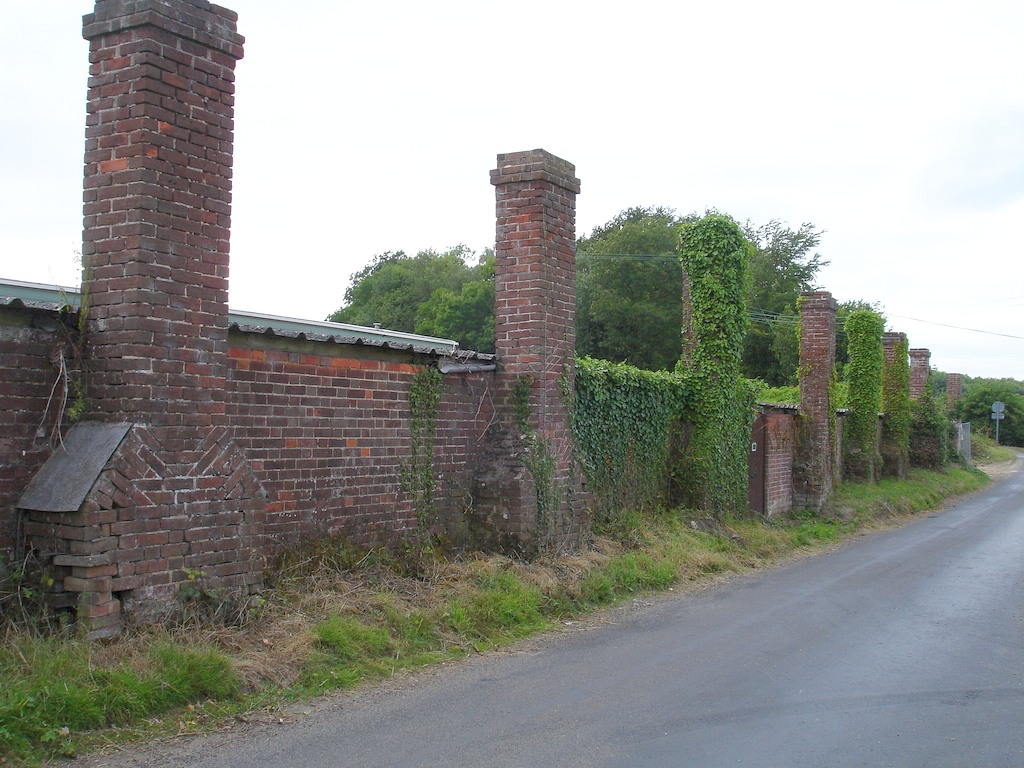
Hopper huts at Downs Farm, Yalding. These had integral fireplaces.

By the late 1950s, hop-picking was becoming an increasingly mechanised process. This, plus the improvements in sanitation at home, led to a decline in the need for hopper huts. The vast majority of huts today are no more. A few survive derelict or converted to residential or other use. Hopper huts can still be seen today at Grange Farm, Tonbridge and Downs Farm, Yalding. A set of hopper huts from North Frith Farm, Hadlow, has been re-erected at the Museum of Kent Life, Sandling. These were a row of six huts built of brick under a peg tiled roof, with integral fireplaces.

== Sources ==
- Sutherland & Walton (1995). Hop Pickers' Hovels Huts & Houses. Burnt Mill, Egerton, Ashford: Christine Swift. ISBN 0-9506977-6-1.
- Filmer, Richard (1982). Hops and hop picking. Princes Risborough, Aylesbury: Shire Publication Ltd. ISBN 0-85263-617-2.
- A Pocketful of Hops. Bromyard: Bromyard Local History Society. 1988. ISBN 0-9502068-4-9.
- Old Days in the Kentish Hop Gardens. West Kent Federation of Women's institutes. 1981.
