= Tonbridge and Malling Borough Council elections =

Tonbridge and Malling Borough Council is the local authority for the borough of Tonbridge and Malling in Kent, United Kingdom. The council is elected every four years. Since the last boundary changes in 2023, 44 councillors have been elected from 19 wards.

== Council composition ==
Composition of the council
Year	Conservative	Liberal Democrats (Note: Includes totals for the predecessors of the Liberal Democrats, the Liberal Party and SDP (both of which participated in the Alliance).)	Labour	Green	Independents & Others	Council control after election
Local government reorganisation; council established (53 seats)
1973	30	8	11	–	4	Conservative
1976	42	4	4	0	3	Conservative
New ward boundaries (52 seats)
1979	40	6	4	0	2	Conservative
1980	37	8	5	0	2	Conservative
1982	36	8	5	0	3	Conservative
1983	36	9	5	0	2	Conservative
1984	35	11	5	0	1	Conservative
1986	33	12	6	0	1	Conservative
1987	30	15	6	0	1	Conservative
1988	32	13	6	0	1	Conservative
New ward boundaries (55 seats)
1991	32	17	6	0	0	Conservative
1995	23	21	11	0	0	No overall control
1999	27	21	7	0	0	No overall control
New ward boundaries (53 seats)
2003	33	13	7	0	0	Conservative
2007	46	7	0	0	0	Conservative
2011	48	4	1	0	0	Conservative
New ward boundaries (53 seats)
2015	48	4	0	0	2	Conservative
2019	39	9	1	2	3 (Note: 3 Independent Alliance (Kent))	Conservative
New ward boundaries (44 seats)
2023	20	11	3	8	2 (Note: 2 Independent Alliance (Kent))	No overall control

The elections scheduled to take place in 1990 were cancelled due to the council's decision to move to all-out elections in 1991 on new boundaries.

== Results maps ==
2003 results map

2007 results map

2011 results map

2015 results map

2019 results map

2023 results map

== By-election results ==
=== 1995–99 ===
A by-election was held in East Peckham Ward following the resignation of E. Pries.

East Peckham Ward By-Election 24 July 1997
Candidate	Party	Votes	%	±%
Stephen John Cresswell	Liberal Democrats	357	41.75%	−18.9%
Keith Stephen Chantler	Conservative Party	337	39.42%	+4.8%
John Edward Howard	Labour Party	161	18.83%	+18.8%
Total		855	100.00%	
Rejected Ballot Papers				
Ballot Papers Issued				
Registered Electors				
Turnout		33.5%		
Liberal Democrats hold				

A by-election was held in Cage Green Ward following the resignation of G. Evans.

Cage Green Ward By-Election 7 May 1998
Candidate	Party	Votes	%	±%
Nicolas John Heslop	Conservative Party	827	58.28%	+13.2%
	Labour Party	368	25.93%	−14.5%
	Liberal Democrats	224	15.79%	+1.2%
Total		1,419	100.00%	
Rejected Ballot Papers				
Ballot Papers Issued				
Registered Electors				
Turnout		44%		
Conservative hold				

=== 1999–03 ===
Wrotham Ward By-Election 4 May 2000
Candidate	Party	Votes	%	±%
Cordelia Emma Julia McCartney	Conservative Party	396	60.46%	+14.4%
	Liberal Democrats	259	39.54%	+39.5%
Total		655	100.00%	
Rejected Ballot Papers				
Ballot Papers Issued				
Registered Electors				
Turnout		45.1%		
Conservative hold				

Snodland East Ward By-Election 31 January 2002
Candidate	Party	Votes	%	±%
Jeremy Hayes	Labour Party	493	58.48%	+8.4%
	Conservative Party	350	41.52%	+16.4%
Total		843	100.00%	
Rejected Ballot Papers				
Ballot Papers Issued				
Registered Electors				
Turnout		27.8%		
Labour hold				

=== 2003–07 ===
A by-election was held in Burham, Wouldham & Eccles Ward following the resignation of John Jennings on 23 August 2004.

Burham, Wouldham & Eccles Ward By-Election 14 October 2004
Candidate	Party	Votes	%	±%
David Anthony Stuart Davis	Conservative Party	660	58.56%	+13.8%
Linda O’Halloran	Liberal Democrats	312	27.68%	−16.7%
Joy Wharton	Labour Party	155	13.75%	+3.0%
Total		1,127	100.00%	
Rejected Ballot Papers				
Ballot Papers Issued				
Registered Electors				
Turnout		35%		
Conservative gain from Liberal Democrats				

A by-election was held in Ightham Ward following the death of Geraldine Bowden.

Ightham Ward By-Election 31 August 2006
Candidate	Party	Votes	%	±%
Frederick Rodney Dodds Chartres	Conservative Party	352	53.91%	−20.6%
Rebecca Jane Hunt	Liberal Democrats	301	46.09%	+20.6%
Total		653	100.00%	
Rejected Ballot Papers				
Ballot Papers Issued				
Registered Electors				
Turnout		42.46%		
Conservative hold				

=== 2007–11 ===
There were no by-elections between May 2007 and May 2011.

=== 2011–15 ===
A by-election was held in West Malling and Leybourne Ward following the death of Mark Worrall on 26 April 2012.

West Malling & Leybourne Ward By-Election 5 July 2012
Candidate	Party	Votes	%	±%
Sophie Olivia Shrubsole	Conservative Party	769	48.33%	−3.5%
Yvonne Mary Smyth	Liberal Democrats	472	29.67%	+9.1%
Peter Graham Stevens	UK Independence Party	127	7.98%	−4.5%
Kathleen Maria Garlick	Labour Party	123	7.73%	−7.4%
Michael Philip Walters	English Democrats	57	3.58%	+3.6%
Howard Porter	Green Party	43	2.70%	+2.7%
Total		1,591	100.00%	
Rejected Ballot Papers		1		
Ballot Papers Issued		1,592		
Registered Electors		4,572		
Turnout		34.82%		
Conservative hold				

A by-election was held in Borough Green and Long Mill Ward following the resignation of David Evans in December 2013.

Borough Green & Long Mill Ward By-Election 9 January 2014
Candidate	Party	Votes	%	±%
Mike Taylor	Independent	692	38.85	+19.2
Stuart Keith Murray	Conservative Party	588	33.02	−5.2
David Leonard Waller	UK Independence Party	349	19.60	+19.6
Victoria Hayman	Labour Party	84	4.72	−3.4
Howard Porter	Green Party	68	3.82	+3.8
Total		1,781	100.00%	
Rejected Ballot Papers		2		
Ballot Papers Issued		1,783		
Registered Electors		5,486		
Turnout		32.50%		
Independent gain				

=== 2015-2019 ===
Trench by-election 8 December 2016
Party	Candidate	Votes	%	±%
Conservative	Georgina Thomas	603	61.2	+17.4
Labour	Fred Long	204	20.7	+1.1
UKIP	David Allen	178	18.1	−0.3
Majority		399	40.5	
Turnout		985		
Conservative hold		Swing		

Aylesford North and Walderslade by-election 4 May 2017
Party	Candidate	Votes	%	±%
Conservative	Des Keers	1,249	71.5	+0.0
Liberal Democrats	Mandy Morrison	349	20.0	+20.0
Green	Frances Long	148	8.5	+8.5
Majority		900	51.5	
Turnout		1,746		
Conservative hold		Swing		

=== 2019-2023 ===
Castle by-election 9 December 2021
Party	Candidate	Votes	%	±%
Green	Anna Cope	731	59.3	+36.0
Conservative	Johurul Islam	454	36.8	−7.4
Labour	Julian Wilson	48	3.9	−5.0
Majority		277	22.5	
Turnout		1,233		
Green gain from Conservative		Swing		

Kings Hill by-election 9 December 2021
Party	Candidate	Votes	%	±%
Conservative	Dan Harman	740	59.3	+12.2
Independent	Louis Westlake	316	25.3	+25.3
Liberal Democrats	Julian Wilson	191	15.3	−3.0
Majority		424	34.0	
Turnout		1,247		
Conservative hold		Swing		

West Malling and Leybourne by-election 9 December 2021
Party	Candidate	Votes	%	±%
Liberal Democrats	Paul Boxall	776	49.6	+17.8
Conservative	David Thompson	624	39.8	+3.9
Green	Jordan Mahoney	137	8.7	+8.7
Labour	Robin Potter	29	1.9	−4.0
Majority		152	9.7	
Turnout		1,566		
Liberal Democrats gain from Conservative		Swing		

=== 2023-2027 ===
Judd by-election 4 July 2024
Party	Candidate	Votes	%	±%
Green	Stacey Pilgrim	2,051	63.6	
Conservative	Jenny Lewis	787	24.4	
Liberal Democrats	Michelle Fallaize	387	12.0	
Majority		1,264	39.2	
Turnout		3,225		
Green hold		Swing		

Snodland East and Ham Hill by-election 1 May 2025
Party	Candidate	Votes	%	±%
Conservative	Luke Chapman	543	44.0	
Labour	Shaun Loader	346	28.0	
Independent	Nick Watts	195	15.8	
Green	Kim Winterbottom	151	12.2	
Majority		197	16.0	
Turnout		1,235		
Conservative gain from Labour		Swing		
