= Aylesford School (Kent) =

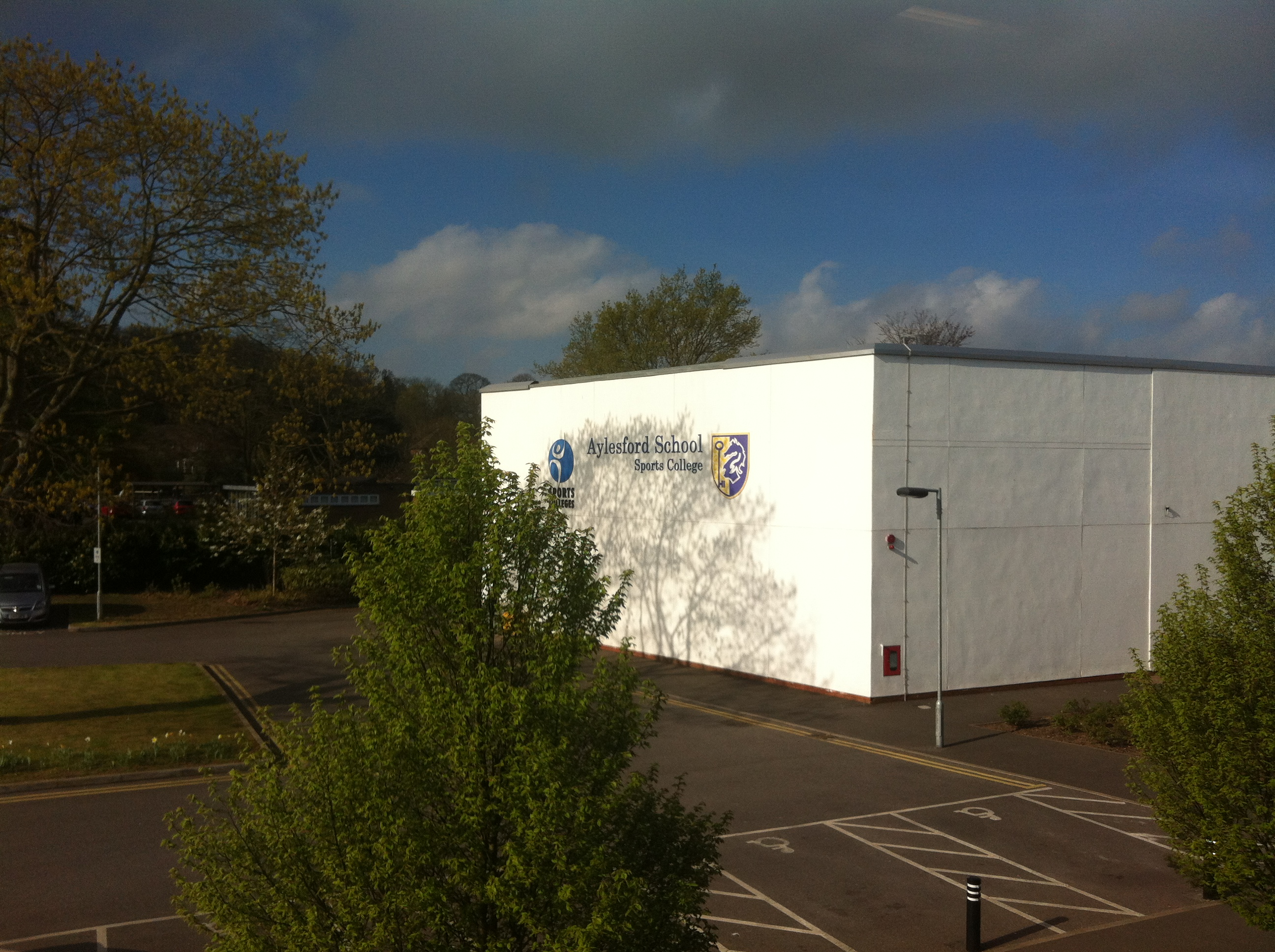
- The main building

Location
- Teapot Lane; Aylesford, Kent, ME20 7JU; England; 51.2992°N 0.4650°E

Information
- Type: Academy
- Established: c. 1940
- Local authority: Kent County Council
- Trust: Character Education Trust
- Department for Education URN: 149319 Tables
- Ofsted: Reports
- Head teacher: Tanya Kelvie
- Gender: Co-educational
- Age: 11 to 18
- Enrolment: 897 (2025)
- Houses: Nightingale, Harvey, Pankhurst, Faraday
- Colours: Blue; White; Yellow
- Website: www.aylesfordschool.co.uk

Aylesford School is a mixed-sex school comprising years 7 to 11, plus a Sixth Form for pupils in years 12 and 13. It is a co-educational secondary school in Kent, England. Situated in modern campus buildings the school serves an area to the west of Maidstone.

== History ==
The school site at Teapot Lane, originally built largely by Italian prisoners of War during the 1940s, was redeveloped in 2005–2008, as part of a KCC-sponsored PFI scheme which also included two other local secondary schools, Holmesdale in Snodland, and The Malling, in East Malling, and three others elsewhere in Kent. Construction of the new school was headed by Costain. Unlike the other schools involved, space constrictions on the site meant that the new buildings had to be built over the original foundations, so a "temporary village" of classrooms was constructed on part of the site to house the majority of pupils and staff during the reconstruction period.

The School achieved Specialist status as a Sports College in 2004, which ensured that a focus on sport was introduced to all aspects of the curriculum, though this specialism was later dropped in 2018.

Secretary of State for Children, Schools and Families, Ed Balls, accompanied by local MP Jonathan Shaw and officials from KCC, officially opened the new school buildings on 28 May 2008. Referring to the three local schools, the Minister said: "If we can do around the country, what we've seen in these three schools, we could really transform education in Britain."

Between 2008–2012, the sixth-form was part of the Medway Valley Sixth-form Consortium - collectively known as WHAM - a collaboration with Wrotham School, Holmesdale Technology College and The Malling School, which offers a wider range of A-level and equivalent courses than any one of the schools could provide individually. Aylesford has a particular strength in Business Studies provision.

Because of the restricted site at Aylesford School, it was necessary to rebuild the school largely in the same location on the site that the old buildings occupied. This required careful planning and a certain amount of disruption to both staff and pupils. When the school was housed in the old buildings, its reputation was very poor. Even with the news that new buildings were on the way, the school was still considered to be underperforming. During the rebuilding process many of the old buildings were demolished and replaced with 23 small mobile classrooms, which become known as the Learning Village. Only B block (Science), C block (Technology and Art) and M block (English, and the library) remained in use from the old school.

The School now consists of 4 Main Buildings named after famous sporting venues: Twickenham, Lords, Wembley and Wimbledon. Wimbledon - formerly known as C-Block, is the only building to remain from the old school, and has been fully refurbished. The School also boasts a large Hall with a performance stage, an indoor sports hall containing 6 badminton courts and mechanically retracting basketball nets, a separate gym with dance mirrors, gymnastics/trampoline facilities and an indoor climbing wall, an outdoor assault course and fitness area, and a Multi-Use Games Area (MUGA). Funding was being sought for an Astroturf football pitch; though these plans have now been scrapped. The school is also equipped with state-of-the-art ICT facilities, with over 500 desktop PCs, over 200 staff and student laptops, fixed and portable projectors, interactive whiteboards and interactive learning zones.

In 2007, Aylesford introduced a new structure: although most teaching and learning continues to be carried out in year-based classes, instead of pupils being in year-based tutor groups, they join small mentor groups with pupils from all years. These meet regularly to focus on removing the barriers to education, so improving pupil's behaviour and achievement levels, through generating a family-based sense of belonging.. From 2007 to 2016, each mentor group belongs to one of four larger groups known as 'Schools of Learning' (SoL). Schools of Learning allow for peer group mentoring to take place naturally, greater involvement for each and every child and more of a competitive atmosphere when it comes to Sports Day and similar events, as well as reducing incidents of bullying and intimidation, breaking down barriers across year groups, easing year seven pupils into secondary school education, and helping to build civil responsibilities and shared experiences for all. Each School of Learning has a Director of Learning (DoL) who acts as a mini Headteacher for that particular "School" and a dedicated Pastoral Support Manager (PSM) who deals entirely with student issues, parental contact in school hours and helps the students on a more personal level.

Headteacher
Deputy Headteacher
Assistant Headteacher
Red SoL	Yellow SoL	Green SoL	Blue SoL
Red DoL	Yellow DoL	Green DoL	Blue DoL
Red PSM	Yellow PSM	Green PSM	Blue PSM

In 2016, Aylesford modified the organisation with the arrival of Headteacher Charlie Guthrie. Schools of Learning were renamed after famous pioneers and scientists. Pastoral Support Management changed from supporting houses to year groups.

Headteacher
Deputy Headteacher
Assistant Headteacher
Nightingale (referring to Florence Nightingale)	Harvey (referring to William Harvey)	Pankhurst (referring to Emmeline Pankhurst)	Faraday (referring to Michael Faraday)
Nightingale DoL	Harvey DoL	Pankhurst DoL	Faraday DoL

Student support within the school:

Year 7	Year 8	Year 9	Year 10	Year 11	Year 12 & 13 (Sixth Form)
Year 7 PSM	Year 8 PSM	Year 9 PSM	Year 10 PSM	Year 11 PSM	Sixth Form PSM

On 16 March 2017, it was reported that the school allegedly prevented students from going to the toilet during class. According to social media, one pupil was excluded from the school for ‘speaking out’ about the issue. A number of parents took to social media to suggest the school was breaching their children's human rights. The school's head teacher, Tanya Kelvie, defended her decision:

"Toilet facilities are always available for all students, however due to inappropriate use by a small number of students it has become necessary to restrict access to toilet facilities during lesson times to the toilets in the Twickenham building. During break and lunch times all toilets are available. Please be assured that at no time will a student be denied necessary access to facilities."

Previously a foundation school administered by Kent County Council, in September 2022 Aylesford School converted to academy status. The school is now sponsored by the Character Education Trust.

=== Recent Headmasters of Aylesford School ===
Name	Period
T. Kelvie	2017 - Current
C. Guthrie	2015 - 2017
D.T. Lawson	2004 - 2014

== Notable people ==
- Luke Basset, pogo stick
