= All Saints Church, Snodland =

Parish church in Snodland, Kent, England

Coordinates: 51.32986°N 0.44968°E

All Saints’ Church, Snodland
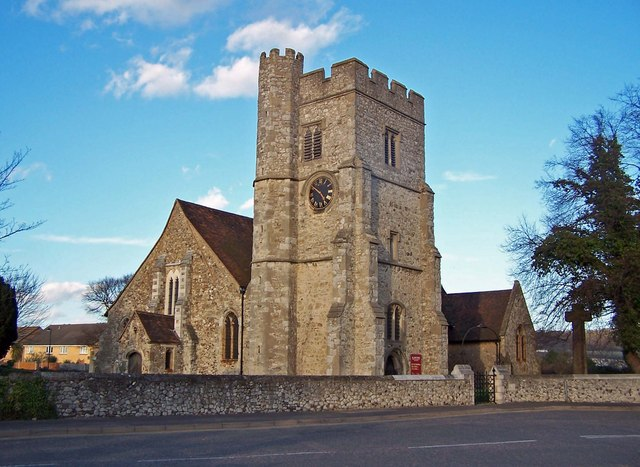

- Location within Kent
- OS grid reference: TQ 70761 61822
- Location: Snodland, Kent
- Country: England
- Denomination: Anglican
- Website: allsaintswithchristchurch.org

History
- Status: Parish church

Architecture
- Functional status: Active
- Heritage designation: Grade I
- Designated: 25 August 1959
- Completed: 12th century

Administration
- Province: Canterbury
- Diocese: Rochester
- Archdeaconry: Tonbridge
- Deanery: Malling
- Parish: Snodland with Lower Birling

All Saints’ Church is the parish church of Snodland in Kent, England. It is a Grade I listed building.

It is dedicated to All Saints.

== Building ==
All Saints’ Church is located nearby to Snodland railway station. It is located at the point where the Pilgrims' Way crosses the River Medway, and is mentioned in the Domesday Book of 1086.

The church was originally built in the 12th century, during the Norman era.

There is evidence of a church on the same site by 1000.

There was a substantial enlarging of the church during the 13th, 14th and 15th centuries.

Above the west window, itself dating from around 1300, an earlier Norman-style arch can still be seen.

The arcades and pillars of the nave are likely from the 14th century, which suggests that the north and south aisles were added then. The walls of the nave would have been pierced and the arches formed once the aisles had been added alongside. Outside from the east and west it can be seen where the roof has been splayed wider to cover the aisles.

The most prominent change was the addition of the tower in the 15th century.

The 19th century saw restoration of the church, first by Henry Dampier Phelps, rector between 1804 and 1865, who moved and added windows, and rebuilt the east wall. A singing gallery was added at the rear of the nave in 1824, and Phelps bought a barrel-organ to play the hymns. The most extensive maintenance occurred in 1869-70 under the direction of Reverend Carey, Phelps's successor. The old pews were gradually replaced and new flooring and roofing was installed. It is said that the Baker family, who ran the ferry, paid for the new vestry as a kind of family memorial; certainly it contains memorial stones and tablets to them. Another major renovation took place in 1905.

The church's medieval glass suffered damage in the Second World War, from an explosion in 1942.

== Burials and Memorials ==
A large memorial in the south aisle commemorates Thomas Waghorn (d. 1850), who pioneered the overland routes to India.

== See also ==
- Snodland
- List of churches in Kent
