= Holborough Marshes =

Nature reserve in Kent, England

Coordinates: 51.337°N 0.449°E

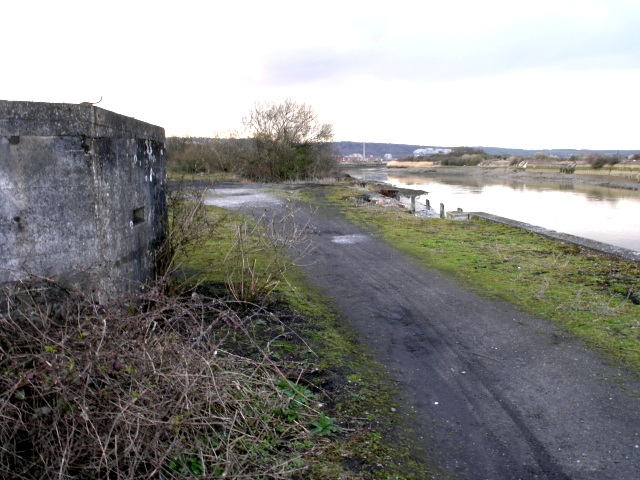
- Coastal pillbox on the River Medway, at Holborough Marshes
- Interactive map of Holborough Marshes
- Type: Nature reserve
- Location: Snodland, Kent
- OS grid: TQ 707 626
- Area: 35 hectares (86 acres)
- Manager: Kent Wildlife Trust

Holborough Marshes is a 35-hectare (86-acre) nature reserve on the outskirts of Snodland, south-west of Chatham in Kent. It is managed by Kent Wildlife Trust. It is part of Holborough to Burham Marshes Site of Special Scientific Interest.

The marshes have a variety of wetland habitats, freshwater marshes, woodland, reedbeds, which are brackish and tidal, wet grassland, scrub, and freshwater and saline dykes. There are water voles, and birds include reed buntings and sedge warblers.

The site is open to the public.
