= Holborough to Burham Marshes =

Protected area in Kent, England

Coordinates: 51.328°N 0.456°E

- Site of Special Scientific Interest
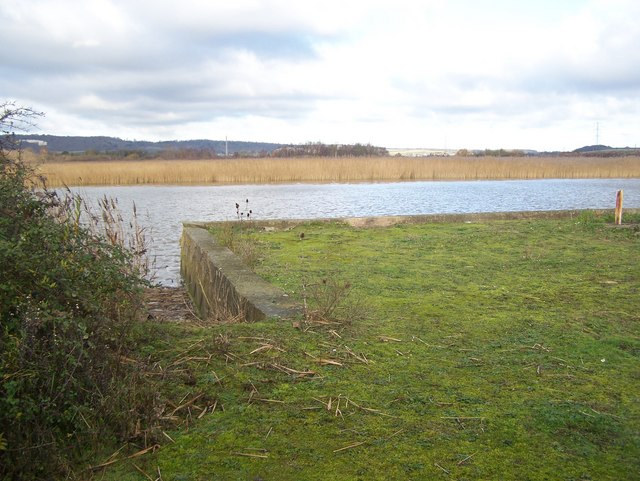
- Location of Holborough to Burham Marshes.
- Area of search: Kent
- Grid reference: TQ 712 616
- Interest: Biological
- Area: 149.8 hectares (370 acres)
- Notification date: 1990
- Location map: Magic Map

Holborough to Burham Marshes is a 149.8-hectare (370-acre) biological Site of Special Scientific Interest Kent. Holborough Marshes and Burham Marsh are managed by the Kent Wildlife Trust.

This site is in the tidal flood plain of the River Medway. It has diverse habitats, with reedbeds, fen, grassland, woodland, scrub and a flooded gravel pit, which attracts wintering wildfowl. There are five rare invertebrates, including three bee species.

There is public access to Holborough Marshes.
