= The Holmesdale School =

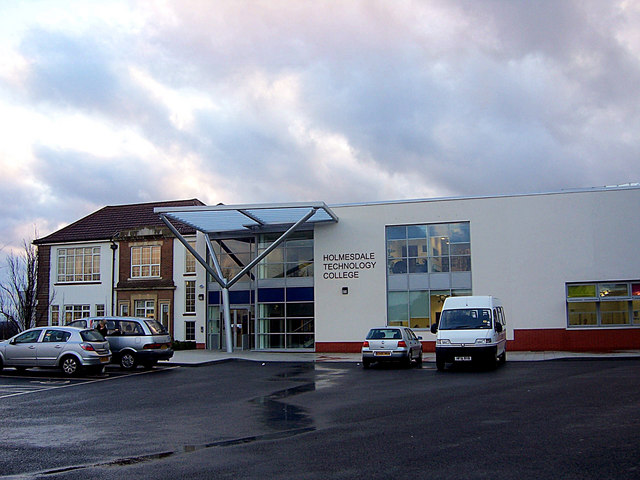

Location
- Malling Road; Snodland, Kent, ME6 5HS; England
- Coordinates: 51.3235°N 0.4375°E

Information
- Type: high school; Academy
- Local authority: Kent County Council
- Trust: Swale Academies Trust
- Department for Education URN: 147897 Tables
- Ofsted: Reports
- Headteacher: Glenn Prebble
- Gender: Coeducational
- Age: 11 to 18
- Enrolment: 838 as of February 2016
- Website: http://www.holmesdale.kent.sch.uk/

The Holmesdale School is a coeducational high school and sixth form located in Snodland, Kent.

It was founded in 1930 and was at one time a foundation school administered by Kent County Council and The Malling Holmesdale Federation Trust, which also included The Malling School. It was also part of the Mid Kent Learning Alliance. In September 2022 The Holmesdale School converted to academy status, and is now sponsored by the Swale Academies Trust.

The Holmesdale School offers GCSEs and BTECs as programmes of study for pupils, while students in the sixth form have the option to study from a range of A Levels and further BTECs. The school was previously designated as a Technology College and was renamed Holmesdale Technology College for a time. Holmesdale Technology College was renamed The Holmesdale School in April 2016, but the school continues to specialise in STEM subjects (Science, Technology, Engineering and Mathematics).

They play a number of different sports including dodgeball and Korfball
