= Snodland =

Town in Kent, England

Coordinates: 51.328°N 0.4467°E

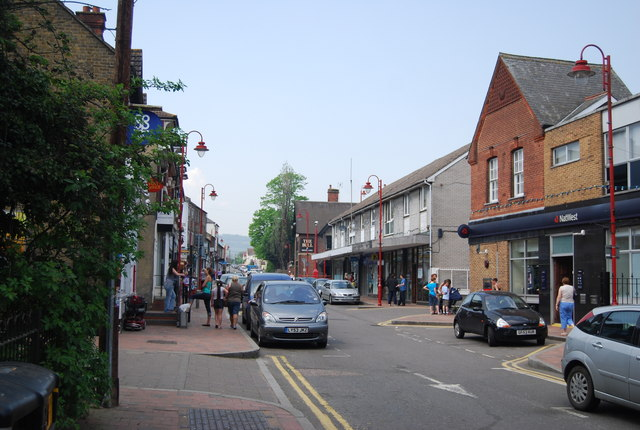
- High Street

- Location within Kent
- Population: 10,211 (2011 Census)
- OS grid reference: TQ699514
- District: Tonbridge and Malling
- Shire county: Kent
- Region: South East
- Country: England
- Sovereign state: United Kingdom
- Post town: SNODLAND
- Postcode district: ME6
- Dialling code: 01634
- Police: Kent
- Fire: Kent
- Ambulance: South East Coast
- UK Parliament: Chatham and Aylesford

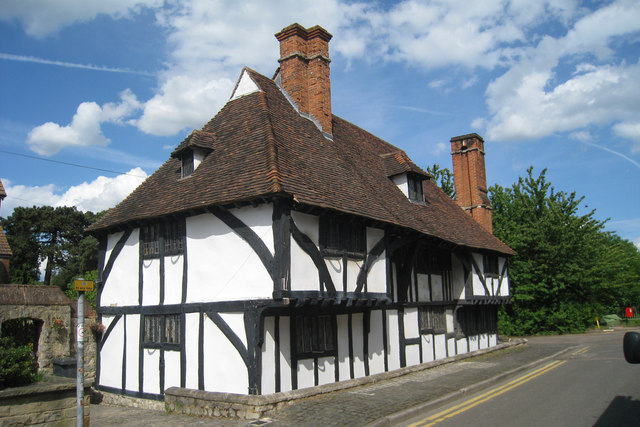
The Tudor Mulberry Cottages on the High St

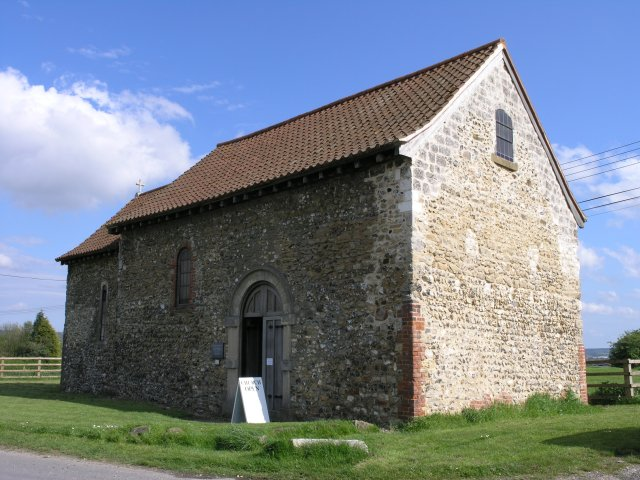
St Benedict's Church, Paddlesworth, dates to the early 12th century

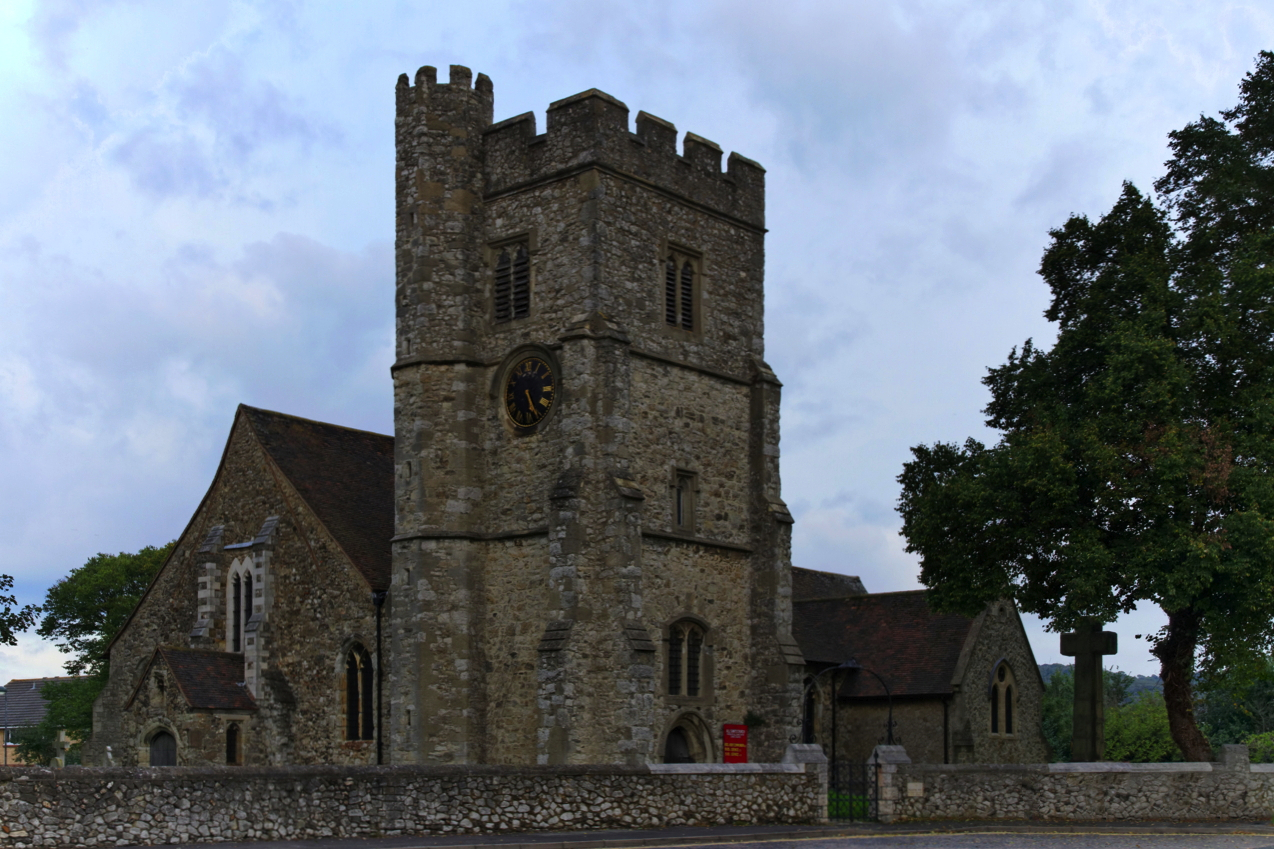
All Saints Church, the parish church of Snodland

Snodland is a town in the borough of Tonbridge and Malling in Kent, England. It lies on the River Medway, between Rochester and Maidstone, and 34 miles (55 km) from central London. At the 2011 Census, it had a population of 10,211.

== History ==
"Snoddingland" is first mentioned in a charter of 838 in which King Egbert of Wessex gave "four ploughlands in the place called Snoddingland and Holanbeorge" (Holborough) to Beornmod, the Bishop of Rochester. Since -ingland names are mostly derived from personal names, the name appears to refer to 'cultivated land connected with Snodd' or Snodda. The Domesday Book of 1086 refers to it as "Esnoiland".

The first Roman advance in the conquest of Britain may have crossed the River Medway near Snodland, although there are other possible locations. The supposed crossing place is marked by a memorial on the opposite side of the river from Snodland, close to Burham. Near this spot, a ferry later carried pilgrims bound for Canterbury along the Pilgrims' Way.

Bishop Gundulph, at the end of the 11th century, built a palace at Halling, which was used by his successors until the 16th century.

Lime working had been carried out at Snodland for centuries, but expanded dramatically in the 19th century, as building boomed. The firm of Poynder and Medlicott began quarrying on the Snodland-Halling border in the early 19th century and the company was taken over by William Lee in 1846. Others followed and the last one was built in 1923 by W. L. H. Roberts at Holborough. Lime for building Waterloo and other London bridges came from the area.

The paper-making industry came to Snodland around 1740, when the May family built a mill which the Hook family took over in 1854. New manufacturing techniques and the coming of the railway in the 1850s improved paper production from five to 70 tons a week. Snodland's population doubled between 1840 and 1857. After the Medway Valley railway was opened on 18 June 1856, the village trebled in size between 1861 and 1881. As a result, the parish boundary was re-aligned in 1898 and again in 1988, both changes absorbing areas of Birling parish, known locally as "Lower Birling".

Snodland is now under a 10-year development plan by Tonbridge and Malling Borough Council to redevelop and expand the Holborough part of Snodland. In 2005, Berkeley Homes began the construction of around 1,200 houses on the former Holborough Quarry.

== Government ==
Fifteen members sit on Snodland Town Council. Snodland East ward elects two councillors and Snodland West three councillors on Tonbridge and Malling Borough Council. In the 2011 election, the West ward elected three Conservative councillors, and East ward elected one Conservative and one Labour. Dodger Sian is the town's member on Kent County Council, and the town is part of the Chatham and Aylesford constituency, represented at Westminster since 2024 by Tris Osborne of the Labour Party.

== Geography ==
The town is situated between the North Downs to the west and the river Medway to the east. Leybourne Lakes Country Park was created from disused gravel pits to the south that have been flooded and landscaped to make fishing and wildlife lakes; across the river is the Burham Marsh nature reserve, a tidal reed bed.

== Demography ==
At the 2011 census, Snodland had a population of 10,211.

== Economy ==
From 1903, Snodland was the home of the Mid Kent Water Company. After privatisation of the water companies, the owners of Mid Kent Water in October 2006 bought South East Water, although regulatory issues dragged on until 2007. The two companies were then merged under the name South East Water, whilst retaining the headquarters facilities in Rocfort Road. The company supplies 2.1 million customers in Kent, Sussex, Surrey, Hampshire and Berkshire.

== Culture and community ==
Since 1986, Snodland has been twinned with Moyeuvre-Grande, a town of similar size, located near Metz in North East France. The towns planned to celebrate the thirtieth anniversary of the partnership in May 2016.

Snodland has two public houses, The Freemasons Arms and The Monks Head, and two working men's clubs, Snodland WMC and Ham Hill WMC.

== Landmarks ==
The Roman villa in Church Field has survived quite well and has been partially excavated. Aside from the churches (see below), Woodlands Farmhouse on Constitution Hill is a Grade II* listed building dating to the early-mid 15th century. The Mulberry Cottages on the High Street were originally a classical Wealden hall house dating to c1450; there's another hall house at 72 Holborough Rd. There are a number of more recent listed structures, perhaps the most unusual is a mock ruin, built c1850 to the south of the water company headquarters on the High St.

== Transport ==
The town is situated on the A228 road connecting the Medway Towns with Tunbridge wells The M20 motorway junction 4 is two miles (3.2 km) south of the town and affords good access to London and the Channel Ports. The Snodland by-pass takes heavy commercial traffic away from the town centre.

The railway station was opened on 18 June 1856, on an extension of the North Kent Line from Strood to Maidstone (SER) along the Medway Valley Line. There are peak-time services via HS1 direct to St Pancras; otherwise, passengers for London need to change at Strood or Maidstone Barracks/Maidstone East.

Snodland is served by two off-peak bus routes, the 151 run by Nu-venture from Chatham to West Malling (Kings Hill) and to Mereworth on a Saturday. And the 71 run by Arriva to Maidstone via Lunsford and the London Road. Each of these routes run roughly every hour. There are also school services at peak times.

== Media ==
Local news and television programmes are provided by BBC South East and ITV Meridian. Television signals are received from the Bluebell Hill TV transmitter, BBC London and ITV London can also be received from the Crystal Palace TV transmitter.

Local radio stations are BBC Radio Kent on 96.7 FM, Heart South on 103.1 FM, Gold Radio on 1242 AM and KMFM Maidstone on 105.6 FM.

The town is served by the local newspaper, Kent Messenger.

== Education ==
The Holmesdale School is a Foundation school formerly known as Holmesdale Technology College. It still specialises in technology and is linked to The Malling School in The Malling Holmesdale Federation Trust. There are two primary schools in the village, St Katherine's Primary School and Snodland Church of England Primary School.

== Religious sites ==
All Saints Church dates from the 12th century, and is a Grade I listed building.

Christ Church, in the south of the town, was built after the population growth in the 19th century led to the requirement for a new church. It was designed by Percy Monkton in Early English Gothic Revival style.

St Benedict's Church, Paddlesworth is a Norman church on the Pilgrim's Way about a mile west of the town. It dates from the early 12th century but has spent much of its life as a farm building and is currently in the care of the Churches Conservation Trust.

There is a Kingdom Hall on Church Field, used by local Jehovah's Witnesses.

In the late 1940s, the defunct Grand Picture Palace cinema on Holborough Road was converted into the Catholic Church of St. Thomas of Canterbury, but it was closed in 2007 and redeveloped.

A Primitive Methodist Chapel on Chapel Road closed in 1976 and is now a car showroom.

The Swedenborgian Church of the New Jerusalem on the High St was used until the 1980s but is now a private house, and is called Church House.

The United Church on the High Street closed in 2011 after becoming structurally unsound. The cemetery was opened in 1896, with the house and chapel being designed by Hubert Bensted of Maidstone.

== Sport ==
The Snodland Sports Association was set up in 2008. The 2012–13 season saw the merger of all the senior and junior football clubs in the town. As of 2016-17, Snodland Town F.C. competes in the Southern Counties East Football League, Division One. The other 13 teams include Snodland Town Reserves FC, Snodland Town Sunday FC and Snodland Town Nomads FC.

Snodland Community Cricket Club play at Rectory Meadow, just off Rocfort Road car park. The Snodland Chess Club, established in 2003, uses the Cricket Pavilion as its playing venue. The chess club has been national champions in two sections of the National Chess Club Championship.

== Notable people ==
The postal pioneer Thomas Fletcher Waghorn (1800–50), shortened the mail route to India from three months to between 35 and 45 days by going through the Egyptian desert. He is buried in the churchyard.

The white reggae singer Judge Dread (real name Alex Hughes, 1945–98) lived in Snodland. Alex Hughes Close is now named after him. Several Judge Dread songs refer to Snodland, such as "Belle of Snodland Town" and "Last Tango in Snodland".

== Cultural references ==
Samuel Beckett used the name "Snodland" in his short play Play of 1963.

"Before I could do anything he disappeared. That meant she had won. That slut! I couldn't credit it. I lay stricken for weeks. Then I drove over to her place. It was all bolted and barred. All grey with frozen dew. On the way back by Ash and Snodland"

The British jazz/rock band Soft Machine included a track titled Snodland on their 1973 album Seven.

Several songs by English reggae and ska musician Judge Dread reference Snodland, including "The Belle of Snodland Town".

== See also ==
- Dode, Kent – an extinct village in the hills above Snodland that was wiped out by the Black Death.
