= 2023 Tonbridge and Malling Borough Council election =

2023 English local election

← 2019	4 May 2023	2027 →

All 44 seats to Tonbridge and Malling Borough Council 23 seats needed for a majority
- Turnout: 35.8%

	First party	Second party	Third party
Leader	Matt Boughton	Anita Oakley	April Clark
Party	Conservative	Liberal Democrats	Green
Last election	39 seats, 46.9%	9 seats, 19.5%	2 seats, 11.5%
Seats won	20	11	8
Seat change	▼19	▲2	▲6
Popular vote	32,304	19,808	16,621
Percentage	40.2%	24.6%	20.7%
Swing	▼6.7%	▲5.1%	▲9.2%
	Fourth party	Fifth party
Leader		Mike Taylor
Party	Labour	Ind. Alliance
Last election	1 seat, 8.0%	3 seats, 8.6%
Seats won	3	2
Seat change	▲2	▼1
Popular vote	6,358	4,472
Percentage	7.9%	5.6%
Swing	▼0.1%	▼3.0%
- Winner of each seat at the 2023 Tonbridge and Malling Borough Council election
Leader before election
Matt Boughton
Conservative
Leader after election
Matt Boughton
Conservative
No overall control

An election took place on 4 May 2023 to elect councillors to Tonbridge and Malling Borough Council in Kent, England. This took place on the same day as other local elections across England. Boundary changes which took effect at this election saw the number of councillors reduced from 54 to 44 and the number of wards reduced from 24 to 19.

The council went from having a Conservative majority to being under no overall control. The Conservatives and Independent Alliance formed a coalition after the election; with 22 councillors they had exactly half the seats on the council. At the subsequent annual council meeting on 17 May 2023 the Conservative leader Matt Boughton retained his position as leader of the council. The vote was initially tied at 22 votes both for and against. The new Conservative mayor, James Lark, used his casting vote in favour of Boughton remaining leader. Independent Alliance leader Mike Taylor was made the cabinet member for planning.

== Summary ==
=== Election result ===
The overall result was as follows:

2023 Tonbridge and Malling Borough Council election
Party	Candidates	Seats	Gains	Losses	Net gain/loss	Seats %	Votes %	Votes	+/−
Conservative	44	20	0	4	▼19	45.5	40.2	32,304	–6.7
Liberal Democrats	23	11	0	0	▲2	25.0	24.6	19,808	+5.1
Green	18	8	2	0	▲6	18.2	20.7	16,621	+9.2
Labour	19	3	2	0	▲2	6.8	7.9	6,358	–0.1
Independent Alliance (Kent)	5	2	0	0	▼1	4.5	5.6	4,472	–3.0
Independent	2	0	0	0	Steady	0.0	0.7	527	–3.4
Reform UK	2	0	0	0	Steady	0.0	0.3	244	N/A
Heritage	1	0	0	0	Steady	0.0	0.1	77	N/A

== Ward results ==
The results for each ward were as follows, with an asterisk (*) indicating a sitting councillor standing for re-election.

=== Aylesford North & North Downs ===
Aylesford North & North Downs (3 seats)
Party	Candidate	Votes	%
Conservative	Roger Dalton*	953	45.9
Conservative	Dave Davis*	909	43.8
Conservative	Alex McDermott	737	35.5
Labour	Stephen Beadle	661	31.9
Liberal Democrats	Julia Bell	471	22.7
Labour	Rizwana Shelley	329	15.9
Liberal Democrats	David Young	321	15.5
Labour	Thomas Shelley	315	15.2
Independent	Jason Green	301	14.5
Green	Em Perera	223	10.7
Green	Mark West	195	9.4
Reform UK	Rob Gailer	119	5.7
Turnout		2,075	29.4
Registered electors		7,071	
Conservative win (new seat)			
Conservative win (new seat)			
Conservative win (new seat)			

=== Aylesford South & Ditton ===
Aylesford South & Ditton (3 seats)
Party	Candidate	Votes	%
Conservative	Steve Hammond*	1,132	53.4
Conservative	Rob Cannon*	975	46.0
Conservative	Colin Williams*	975	46.0
Liberal Democrats	Dan Markham	789	37.2
Liberal Democrats	Trevor Walker	778	36.7
Liberal Democrats	James Cox	700	33.0
Labour	Julia Jenner	284	13.4
Labour	Paul Wilson	241	11.4
Turnout		2,120	32.2
Registered electors		6,576	
Conservative win (new seat)			
Conservative win (new seat)			
Conservative win (new seat)			

=== Birling, Leybourne & Ryarsh ===
Birling, Leybourne & Ryarsh (2 seats)
Party	Candidate	Votes	%
Liberal Democrats	Paul Boxall*	957	59.7
Liberal Democrats	Bill Banks	870	54.2
Conservative	Mary McKinlay	558	34.8
Conservative	Sam Webb	543	33.9
Labour	Deirdre Evans	120	7.5
Turnout		1,604	35.2
Registered electors		4,563	
Liberal Democrats win (new seat)			
Liberal Democrats win (new seat)			

=== Borough Green & Platt ===
Borough Green & Platt (2 seats)
Party	Candidate	Votes	%
Ind. Alliance	Mike Taylor*	1,233	75.6
Ind. Alliance	Wendy Palmer*	1,199	73.5
Conservative	Patrick Lohlein	319	19.6
Conservative	Christian Wragg	291	17.8
Turnout		1,631	35.7
Registered electors		4,565	
Ind. Alliance win (new seat)			
Ind. Alliance win (new seat)			

=== Bourne ===
Bourne (2 seats)
Party	Candidate	Votes	%
Green	Steve Crisp	761	44.5
Conservative	James Lark*	730	42.7
Green	Bernice Catt	725	42.4
Conservative	Piers Montague*	655	38.3
Ind. Alliance	Sue Butterfill	355	20.8
Turnout		1,709	41.3
Registered electors		4,137	
Green win (new seat)			
Conservative win (new seat)			

=== Cage Green & Angel ===
Cage Green & Angel (3 seats)
Party	Candidate	Votes	%
Green	Anna Cope*	1,828	62.3
Green	Robert Oliver	1,737	59.2
Green	Bethan Parry	1,639	55.9
Conservative	Vivian Branson*	1,128	38.5
Conservative	Jenny Lewis	1,087	37.1
Conservative	Johurul Islam	983	33.5
Turnout		2,933	43.7
Registered electors		6,715	
Green win (new seat)			
Green win (new seat)			
Green win (new seat)			

=== East Malling, West Malling & Offham ===
East Malling, West Malling & Offham (3 seats)
Party	Candidate	Votes	%
Liberal Democrats	Trudy Dean*	1,831	62.4
Liberal Democrats	Roger Roud*	1,620	55.2
Liberal Democrats	Michelle Tatton*	1,598	54.5
Conservative	David Thompson	695	23.7
Conservative	Simon Slater	626	21.3
Conservative	Joel Blacket	515	17.6
Turnout		2,402	36.2
Registered electors		6,629	
Liberal Democrats win (new seat)			
Liberal Democrats win (new seat)			
Liberal Democrats win (new seat)			

=== East Peckham, West Peckham, Mereworth & Wateringbury ===
East Peckham, West Peckham, Mereworth & Wateringbury (2 seats)
Party	Candidate	Votes	%
Conservative	Sarah Hudson*	1,260	63.2
Conservative	Matt Boughton*	1,201	60.2
Green	Kim Winterbottom	377	18.9
Green	Stephen Jackson	348	17.4
Labour	Robin Potter	279	14.0
Liberal Democrats	Suzanne Burdon	268	13.4
Turnout		1,995	40.0
Registered electors		4,991	
Conservative win (new seat)			
Conservative win (new seat)			

=== Higham ===
Higham (2 seats)
Party	Candidate	Votes	%	±%
Green	Lee Athwal	1,240	54.7	+34.3
Conservative	Dennis King*	1,106	48.8	–10.1
Green	Antony Burdon	1,101	48.6	N/A
Conservative	Frixos Tombolis*	951	42.0	–3.6
Turnout		2,265	47.6	+10.9
Registered electors		4,757		
Green gain from Conservative				
Conservative hold				

=== Hildenborough ===
Hildenborough (2 seats)
Party	Candidate	Votes	%	±%
Conservative	Mark Rhodes*	1,011	52.6	–0.4
Green	Kath Barton	928	48.3	+25.7
Conservative	Steve Webster	812	42.2	–4.3
Liberal Democrats	Helen Hobhouse	505	26.3	+11.3
Labour	Michael Connor	282	14.7	+6.2
Turnout		1,923	44.8	+5.2
Registered electors		4,289		
Conservative hold				
Green gain from Conservative				

=== Judd ===
Judd (2 seats)
Party	Candidate	Votes	%	±%
Green	Mark Hood*	1,633	79.0	+1.9
Green	George Hines	1,562	75.6	+0.2
Conservative	Holly Ware	358	17.3	–0.5
Conservative	Paul Webster	321	15.5	+1.6
Labour	Matthew Oliver	151	7.3	N/A
Turnout		2,066	44.1	–6.8
Registered electors		4,683		
Green hold				
Green hold				

=== Kings Hill ===
Kings Hill (3 seats)
Party	Candidate	Votes	%	±%
Conservative	Dan Harman*	1,085	56.8	+9.4
Conservative	Christopher Brown*	1,048	54.8	+0.1
Conservative	Kim Tanner*	1,047	54.8	+13.4
Green	Richard Dowling	480	25.1	N/A
Green	Louis Westlake	438	22.9	N/A
Labour	Kathleen Garlick	258	13.5	N/A
Liberal Democrats	Nick Taplin	256	13.4	–7.8
Labour	Sarah Palmer	234	12.2	N/A
Liberal Democrats	Ken Poege	234	12.2	–4.4
Liberal Democrats	James Young	216	11.3	N/A
Turnout		1,911	27.6	+1.8
Registered electors		6,930		
Conservative hold				
Conservative hold				
Conservative hold				

=== Larkfield ===
Larkfield (3 seats)
Party	Candidate	Votes	%
Liberal Democrats	David Thornewell*	1,401	78.5
Liberal Democrats	Anita Oakley*	1,385	77.6
Liberal Democrats	Timothy Bishop*	1,372	76.9
Conservative	Dougie Dick	371	20.8
Conservative	Harry Noble	284	15.9
Conservative	Edward Thackwell	272	15.2
Turnout		1,785	25.8
Registered electors		6,911	
Liberal Democrats win (new seat)			
Liberal Democrats win (new seat)			
Liberal Democrats win (new seat)			

=== Pilgrims with Ightham ===
Pilgrims with Ightham (2 seats)
Party	Candidate	Votes	%
Conservative	Robin Betts*	987	53.0
Conservative	Martin Coffin*	934	50.1
Ind. Alliance	Tim Shaw*	908	48.7
Ind. Alliance	Scott Millener	777	41.7
Turnout		1,864	40.9
Registered electors		4,588	
Conservative win (new seat)			
Conservative win (new seat)			

=== Snodland East & Ham Hill ===
Snodland East & Ham Hill (2 seats)
Party	Candidate	Votes	%	±%
Labour	Wayne Mallard	487	52.3	+11.9
Conservative	Sue Bell*	445	47.8	–5.6
Labour	Martin Aldridge	430	46.2	N/A
Conservative	Brian Luker*	399	42.9	–5.4
Turnout		931	22.3	+0.6
Registered electors		4,182		
Labour gain from Conservative				
Conservative hold				

=== Snodland West & Holborough Lakes ===
Snodland West & Holborough Lakes (2 seats)
Party	Candidate	Votes	%	±%
Labour	Paul Hickmott*	755	62.7	+10.6
Labour	Angus Bennison	638	53.0	+10.0
Conservative	David Gaunt	422	35.0	–15.0
Conservative	Archie Bartlett	415	34.5	–14.5
Heritage	Vicky Parker	77	6.4	N/A
Turnout		1,204	27.4	+0.9
Registered electors		4,394		
Labour hold				
Labour gain from Conservative				

=== Trench ===
Trench (2 seats)
Party	Candidate	Votes	%	±%
Conservative	Adem Mehmet	735	43.2	–2.2
Conservative	Keith Tunstall	726	42.6	–2.4
Green	Stacey Pilgrim	720	42.3	N/A
Green	Chris Hill	686	40.3	N/A
Labour	Callum Lake	173	10.2	–13.3
Labour	Kathryn Parish	165	9.7	–13.2
Liberal Democrats	Yvonne Brightmore	97	5.7	N/A
Turnout		1,703	40.8	+11.9
Registered electors		4,172		
Conservative hold				
Conservative hold				

=== Vauxhall ===
Vauxhall (3 seats)
Party	Candidate	Votes	%	±%
Liberal Democrats	Frances Hoskins*	1,487	63.2	–1.7
Liberal Democrats	Garry Bridge*	1,306	55.5	–1.9
Liberal Democrats	James Clokey	1,275	54.2	N/A
Conservative	David Cain	612	26.0	–13.8
Conservative	Michael Payne	603	25.6	–8.1
Conservative	Roberick Tay	544	23.1	N/A
Labour	Kerry Jordan-Daus	338	14.4	N/A
Independent	Rachna Sinha	226	9.6	N/A
Reform UK	Peregrine White	125	5.3	N/A
Turnout		2,352	37.8	+2.4
Registered electors		6,225		
Liberal Democrats hold				
Liberal Democrats hold				
Liberal Democrats win (new seat)				

=== Walderslade ===
Walderslade
Party	Candidate	Votes	%
Conservative	Des Keers*	544	65.3
Labour Co-op	Lola Oyemusi	218	26.2
Liberal Democrats	Lisa Cox	71	8.5
Majority		326	39.1
Turnout		844	36.0
Registered electors		2,345	
Conservative win (new seat)			

== By-elections ==
=== Judd ===
Judd by-election: 4 July 2024
Party	Candidate	Votes	%	±%
Green	Stacey Pilgrim	2,051	63.6	–12.6
Conservative	Jenny Lewis	787	24.4	+7.7
Liberal Democrats	Michelle Fallaize	387	12.0	N/A
Majority		1,264	39.2	N/A
Turnout		3,225		
Green hold		Swing	▼10.2	

=== Snodland East & Ham Hill ===
Snodland East & Ham Hill by-election: 1 May 2025
Party	Candidate	Votes	%	±%
Conservative	Luke Chapman	543	44.0	–3.7
Labour	Shaun Loader	346	28.0	–24.3
Independent	Nick Watts	195	15.8	N/A
Green	Kim Winterbottom	151	12.2	N/A
Majority		197	16.0	N/A
Turnout		1,235		
Conservative gain from Labour		Swing	▲10.3	
