= Forwarding agent (philately) =

Historically, an intermediary in the delivery of international mail

In philately, a forwarding agent was an intermediary who facilitated the routing of international mail before the development of the modern postal system.

A forwarding agent's cachet is "A strike or endorsement applied to a letter to indicate that it had been handled in transit by means other than the Postal Service." Their markings are distinguished, and can be a collectible.

== History ==
In the early days of postal communications it was often necessary for international mail to pass through a number of hands before reaching its eventual destination. At each stage the agent would add their own mark. For instance, a letter might pass first through the sender's domestic post office's hands, then to a forwarder for a sea journey and then to the post office of the destination country.

The study of the marks of forwarding agents on mail is a popular branch of postal history.

== See also ==
- Thomas Fletcher Waghorn
