= 2007 Tonbridge and Malling Borough Council election =

2007 UK local government election

← 2003	3 May 2007	2011 →

All 53 seats up for election 27 seats needed for a majority
	First party	Second party
Leader	Mark Worrall	David Thornewell
Party	Conservative	Liberal Democrats
Seats won	46	7
Seat change	▲12	▼5
- Results of the 2007 Tonbridge and Malling Borough Council election
Leader before election
Mark Worrall
Conservative
Leader-elect
Mark Worrall
Conservative

Elections to Tonbridge and Malling Borough Council were held on 3 May 2007. The whole borough council (53 members) was up for election. Parish council elections were held on the same day.

== Overall results ==
Tonbridge & Malling Borough Council, 2007
Party	Seats	+/-
Conservative Party	46	+12
Liberal Democrats	7	-5
Labour Party	0	-7
Total	53	
Valid Ballot Papers		
Rejected Ballot Papers		
Ballot Papers Issued		
Registered Electors		
Turnout		
