= Thomas Fletcher Waghorn =

British postal pioneer (1800–1850)

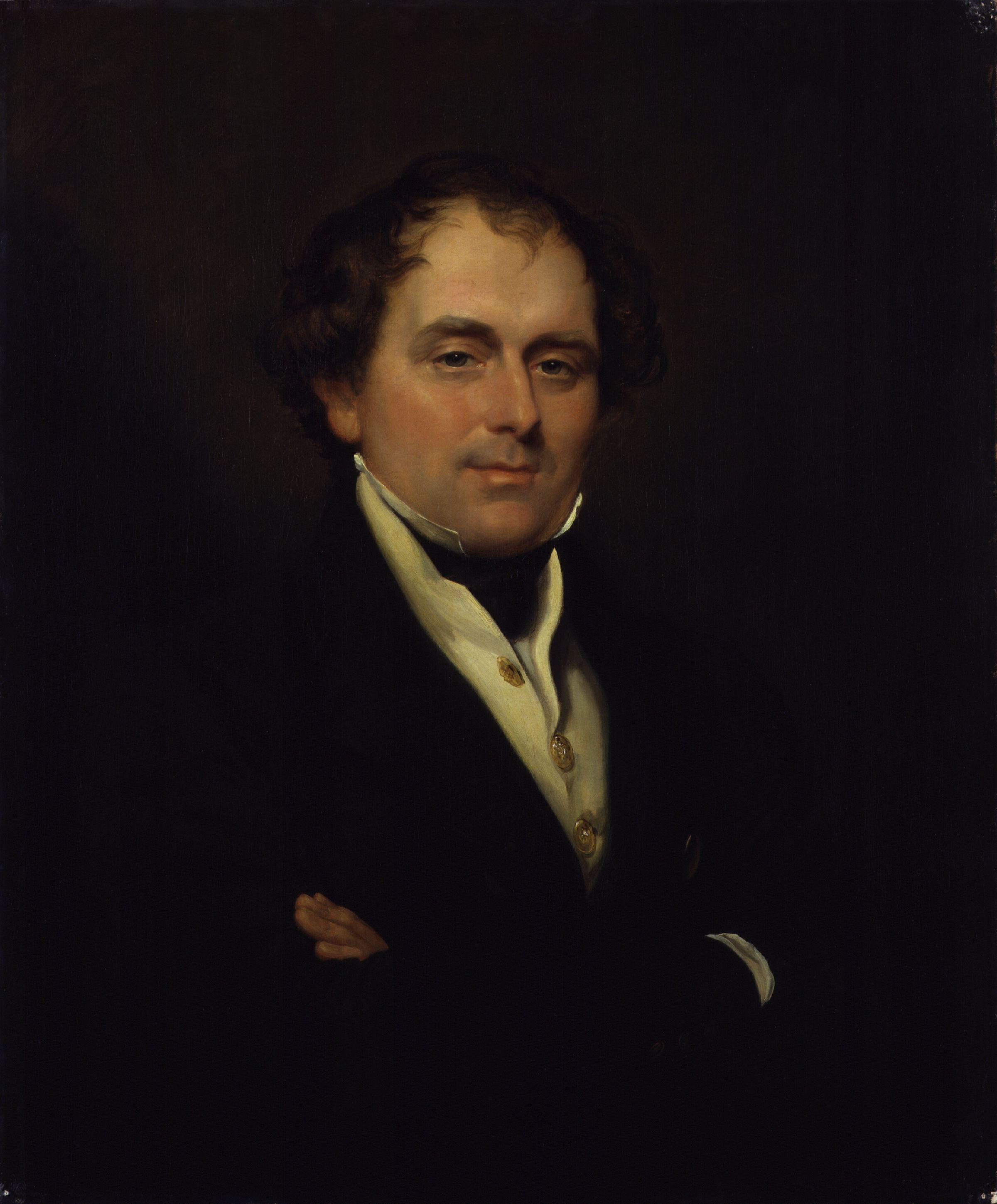
- Waghorn, circa 1847, by George Hayter
- Born: 20 June 1800; Chatham, Medway, England
- Died: 7 January 1850 (aged 49); Islington, London, England
- Burial place: All Saints', Snodland
- Spouse: Elizabeth Bartlett
- Military career
- Allegiance: United Kingdom
- Branch: Royal Navy
- Commands: Cutter
- Conflicts: Arakan War

Thomas Fletcher Waghorn (20 June 1800 – 7 January 1850) was an English sailor, navy officer, and postal pioneer who promoted and claimed the idea of a new route from Great Britain to India overland through Egypt prior to the development of the Suez Canal. Waghorn claimed to have demonstrated the route for the first time in 1829-30 and that it reduced the journey from over 11,000 miles (18,000 km) to 6,000 miles (9,700 km) and while steamships around the Cape of Good Hope took about three months, his route took between 35 and 45 days. A 2004 biography states that there is little substance to many of the claims that he made and that he was mostly a fraudulent self-publicist, contrary to some earlier sources. A statue of him stands in Chatham, Kent while another installed at Suez by Ferdinand de Lesseps in 1869 was destroyed in 1956.

== Life ==
Waghorn was born at 166 High Street, Chatham, England, and baptised at St Mary's Church on 16 July 1800. His father, also Thomas, was a butcher and had married Ann Goodhugh at All Saints' Church, Snodland, on 28 July 1794.

At twelve years of age, Thomas entered the Royal Navy at Chatham, joining the frigate Tigris and then HMS Bahama as a midshipman in November 1812. He then became a third mate on a free trader and moved to Calcutta. In 1819 he joined the Bengal Marine Pilot Service. He married Elizabeth Bartlett at St John's Cathedral, Calcutta, in 1822. In 1824 he served during the Arakan War with the navy. Commanding a Company cutter, Matchless, he mounted a 12-pounder gun onto a rocky island in the Arakan River that came to be called Waghorn's Rock. Sickness led him to go on furlough in 1827. He took an interest in the early attempts at establishing a steamship route from England to India and the East and petitioned for it along with numerous businessmen. Lord Combermere put Waghorn in charge of taking the idea forward in England. Retiring from naval duties as a lieutenant in 1832, he made several trips between England and India via Egypt to find ways to move letters and post. He met many people during this period including the Pasha of Egypt, who supported his overland desert route idea between Alexandria and Suez.

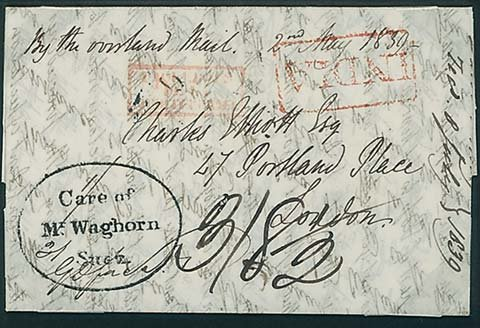
"Care of Mr. Waghorn" 2 May 1839 by the Overland Mail, Calcutta via Egypt and France to London

Personal tragedy followed in March 1834 when his wife died in Calcutta. By December, however, Waghorn had remarried – to Harriet Martin, daughter of the miller at Snodland and a neighbour of his mother. That month, he also inherited a substantial estate from his grandfather, and the couple lived in Rochester until building The Lodge in Snodland's upper High Street about 1836 and mortgaged it.

Thomas Waghorn's statue in Chatham

Waghorn's business plan began to flourish. He set up an agency along with George Wheatley in Cornhill, London, for conveying post – and passengers – to India via Egypt. Between 1835 and 1837, he lived among Arabs in the desert and laid the foundations for the overland route across the desert from Cairo to Suez. This involved building rest-houses and supplying guides, steamboats, horses and carriages for travellers. The route was primarily used as a postal service, and the transport of passengers did not provide much comfort – a 24-hour ride across a usually hot desert with camels and donkeys. Waghorn had to negotiate with the local Bedouins for safe passage even with Ali's official government blessing in 1837.

He became deputy consul in Egypt in 1837 but soon fell out with the authorities. From 1840, P&O set up in competition with him, backed by the British government, and he was out of business by 1844. Then came another setback: 300 horses died in a plague. It was the end, and the Pasha bought him out.

Waghorn turned his attention to speeding the post in Europe, through the new railway system. He was successful, but the Government reneged on a deal to pay his expenses for the trials, which left him £5,000 in debt.

Waghorn died at his London home in Islington on 7 January 1850. He was buried at All Saints', Snodland, just outside the vestry door. The south wall of the nave bears a memorial to him.

In 1869, Ferdinand de Lesseps had a statue of Waghorn made by Vital Dubray installed near to the Suez Canal to honour his achievements. This statue was destroyed in 1956, at the time of the Suez Crisis. A statue of Waghorn was raised in Railway Street, Chatham, in 1888. Its inscription is: "Thomas Waghorn - Lieutenant RN - Pioneer and founder of the overland route - Born at Chatham 1800 - Died January 7th 1850". The statue depicts him pointing north erroneously, it was originally intended to be sited elsewhere pointing east towards the route across Egypt he created. A public house in Railway Street is also named after him. In the 21st century, Waghorn's statue has often been bedecked by the locals with a traffic cone over his head. This feature was popularized when River Medway, contestant on the third series of RuPaul's Drag Race UK presented a runway look as the statue wearing a traffic cone wig.

The 2004 biographical entry by Freda Harcourt in the Oxford Dictionary of National Biography notes that many of Waghorn's claims were false. She notes that Waghorn achieved fame by accident.

== See also ==
- Forwarding agent
