= 2011 Tonbridge and Malling Borough Council election =

2011 UK local government election

← 2007	5 May 2011	2015 →

All 53 seats up for election 27 seats needed for a majority
- Turnout: 44.83%
	First party	Second party
Leader	Mark Worrall	David Thornewell
Party	Conservative	Liberal Democrats
Leader's seat	West Malling & Leybourne	Larkfield North
Seats before	46	7
Seats won	48	4
Seat change	▲2	▼3
- Results of the 2011 Tonbridge and Malling Borough Council election
Leader before election
Mark Worrall
Conservative
Leader-elect
Mark Worrall
Conservative

Elections to Tonbridge and Malling Borough Council were held on 5 May 2011. The whole borough council (53 members) was up for election. Parish council elections and the national Alternative Vote referendum were held on the same day.

== Overall results ==
The Conservatives tightened their grip on the council by gaining three seats from the Liberal Democrats. They however lost one seat to Labour who now had a presence on the council after a four-year absence. The leader of the Liberal Democrats David Thornewell lost his seat after 37 years on the council. Thornewell had been a member of the Council since its creation in 1974. He had also been a member of Malling Rural District Council, one of the council's predecessors, between 1972 and 1974.

Tonbridge & Malling Borough Council
Party	Seats	+/-
Conservative Party	48	+2
Liberal Democrats	4	-3
Labour Party	1	+1
Total	53	
Valid Ballot Papers	39,512	
Rejected Ballot Papers	454	
Ballot Papers Issued	39,966	
Registered Electors	89,146	
Turnout	44.83%	

== Ward results ==
Aylesford Ward (2)
Candidate	Party	Votes	% (Total)	% (Valid)
John Albert Leonard Balcombe	Conservative Party	1,061	38.82%	64.26%
David William Smith	Conservative Party	978	35.78%	59.24%
Julia Susan Taylor	Labour Party	362	13.25%	21.93%
Stephen Coddrington Clarke	Liberal Democrats	332	12.15%	20.11%
Total		2,733	100.00%	
Valid Ballot Papers		1,651		
Rejected Ballot Papers		20		
Ballot Papers Issued		1,671		
Registered Electors		3,861		
Turnout		43.28%		

Blue Bell Hill & Walderslade Ward (2)
Candidate	Party	Votes	% (Total)	% (Valid)
Peter John Homewood	Conservative Party	1,072	46.03%	76.68%
Allan Kenneth Sullivan	Conservative Party	896	38.47%	64.09%
Richard James Baron	Labour Party	361	15.50%	25.82%
Total		2,329	100.00%	
Valid Ballot Papers		1,398		
Rejected Ballot Papers		42		
Ballot Papers Issued		1,440		
Registered Electors		3,208		
Turnout		44.89%		

Borough Green & Long Mill Ward (3)
Candidate	Party	Votes	% (Total)	% (Valid)
Sue Murray	Conservative Party	1,522	23.93%	57.46%
David William Patrick Evans	Conservative Party	1,422	22.36%	53.68%
Tony Sayer	Conservative Party	1,256	19.75%	47.41%
Mike Taylor	Independent	783	12.31%	29.56%
Paul Michael Spensley	Independent	454	7.14%	17.14%
Victoria Hayman	Labour Party	321	5.05%	12.12%
Stephen Hayman	Labour Party	302	4.75%	11.40%
James Hayman	Labour Party	300	4.72%	11.33%
Total		6,360	100.00%	
Valid Ballot Papers		2,649		
Rejected Ballot Papers		70		
Ballot Papers Issued		2,719		
Registered Electors		5,296		
Turnout		51.34%		

Burham, Eccles & Wouldham Ward (2)
Candidate	Party	Votes	% (Total)	% (Valid)
Roger William Dalton	Conservative Party	837	34.52%	60.39%
Dave Davis	Conservative Party	808	33.32%	58.30%
Marion Irene Mountford	Labour Party	362	14.93%	26.12%
Timothy Peter Fulwell	Liberal Democrats	216	8.91%	15.58%
Valerie Ann Lilian Oxberry	Liberal Democrats	202	8.33%	14.57%
Total		2,425	100.00%	
Valid Ballot Papers		1,386		
Rejected Ballot Papers		30		
Ballot Papers Issued		1,416		
Registered Electors		3,419		
Turnout		41.42%		

Cage Green Ward (2)
Candidate	Party	Votes	% (Total)	% (Valid)
Mark Osmond Davis	Conservative Party	1,065	37.53%	65.06%
Nicolas John Heslop	Conservative Party	1,044	36.79%	63.78%
Bruce Goodhart	Labour Party	314	11.06%	19.18%
Jason Lower	Liberal Democrats	223	7.86%	13.62%
Howard Porter	Green Party	192	6.77%	11.73%
Total		2,838	100.00%	
Valid Ballot Papers		1,637		
Rejected Ballot Papers		17		
Ballot Papers Issued		1,654		
Registered Electors		3,251		
Turnout		50.88%		

Castle Ward (2)
Candidate	Party	Votes	% (Total)	% (Valid)
Vivian Mary Chimmo Branson	Conservative Party	1,049	32.98%	63.58%
Owen Charles Baldock	Conservative Party	1,030	32.38%	62.42%
Hazel Frances Dawe	Green Party	326	10.25%	19.76%
Gill Wilson	Liberal Democrats	294	9.24%	17.82%
Steven Mark Dawe	Green Party	271	8.52%	16.42%
Tim Wilson	Liberal Democrats	211	6.63%	12.79%
Total		3,181	100.00%	
Valid Ballot Papers		1,650		
Rejected Ballot Papers		52		
Ballot Papers Issued		1,702		
Registered Electors		3,600		
Turnout		47.28%		

Ditton Ward (2)
Candidate	Party	Votes	% (Total)	% (Valid)
Jeannett Marie Bellamy	Conservative Party	864	27.68%	51.92%
Carol Mary Gale	Conservative Party	805	25.79%	48.38%
Barry David Stone	Liberal Democrats	495	15.86%	29.75%
Paul Hatcher	Liberal Democrats	480	15.38%	28.85%
Alan Piper	Labour Party	254	8.14%	15.26%
Daniel James Frost	Labour Party	223	7.15%	13.40%
Total		3,121	100.00%	
Valid Ballot Papers		1,664		
Rejected Ballot Papers		25		
Ballot Papers Issued		1,689		
Registered Electors		3,689		
Turnout		45.78%		

Downs Ward (2)
Candidate	Party	Votes	% (Total)	% (Valid)
Ann Kemp	Conservative Party	1,056	39.43%	72.03%
Matthew Aidan Craig Balfour	Conservative Party	1,032	38.54%	70.40%
Andrew Payne	Liberal Democrats	349	13.03%	23.81%
Hugh James Maxwell Young	Liberal Democrats	241	9.00%	16.44%
Total		2,678	100.00%	
Valid Ballot Papers		1,466		
Rejected Ballot Papers		33		
Ballot Papers Issued		1,499		
Registered Electors		2,899		
Turnout		51.71%		

East Malling Ward (2)
Candidate	Party	Votes	% (Total)	% (Valid)
Liz Simpson	Liberal Democrats	737	34.47%	55.88%
Christine Jean Woodger	Liberal Democrats	541	25.30%	41.02%
Richard Charles Brown	Conservative Party	410	19.18%	31.08%
Peter McDermott	Conservative Party	277	12.96%	21.00%
Stuart Terrence	Independent	173	8.09%	13.12%
Total		2,138	100.00%	
Valid Ballot Papers		1,319		
Rejected Ballot Papers		9		
Ballot Papers Issued		1,328		
Registered Electors		3,496		
Turnout		37.99%		

East Peckham & Golden Green Ward (2)
Candidate	Party	Votes	% (Total)	% (Valid)
Liz Holland	Conservative Party	924	38.07%	65.58%
Howard Seymour Rogers	Conservative Party	784	32.30%	55.64%
Tony Mark Dowdeswell	UK Independence Party	222	9.15%	15.76%
Terry Scott	Labour Party	220	9.06%	15.61%
Adriana Fabin	Liberal Democrats	153	6.30%	10.86%
Ralph Lovesey	Liberal Democrats	124	5.11%	8.80%
Total		2,427	100.00%	
Valid Ballot Papers		1,409		
Rejected Ballot Papers		9		
Ballot Papers Issued		1,418		
Registered Electors		3,079		
Turnout		46.05%		

Hadlow, Mereworth & West Peckham Ward (2)
Candidate	Party	Votes	% (Total)	% (Valid)
Jill Ann Anderson	Conservative Party	1,198	44.85%	77.99%
Janet Lynne Sergison	Conservative Party	1,069	40.02%	69.60%
Charles Henry Fraser Vernon	Liberal Democrats	404	15.13%	26.30%
Total		2,671	100.00%	
Valid Ballot Papers		1,536		
Rejected Ballot Papers		36		
Ballot Papers Issued		1,572		
Registered Electors		3,369		
Turnout		46.66%		

Higham Ward (3)
Candidate	Party	Votes	% (Total)	% (Valid)
Andy Allison	Conservative Party	1,513	26.13%	68.80%
Tom Edmondston-Low	Conservative Party	1,433	24.75%	65.17%
David John Trice	Conservative Party	1,336	23.07%	60.75%
Douglas Ramsay	Labour Party	534	9.22%	24.28%
Emily Williams	Labour Party	508	8.77%	23.10%
Alastair Mordaunt	Labour Party	467	8.06%	21.24%
Total		5,791	100.00%	
Valid Ballot Papers		2,199		
Rejected Ballot Papers		35		
Ballot Papers Issued		2,234		
Registered Electors		4,633		
Turnout		48.22%		

Hildenborough Ward (2)
Candidate	Party	Votes	% (Total)	% (Valid)
Mark Russell Rhodes	Conservative Party	1,361	37.69%	71.03%
Chris Smith	Conservative Party	1,259	34.87%	65.71%
Justine Mountford	Green Party	278	7.70%	14.51%
Joseph William Barry Gray	Liberal Democrats	253	7.01%	13.20%
Stuart John Riches	Liberal Democrats	235	6.51%	12.27%
Richard Mountford	Green Party	225	6.23%	11.74%
Total		3,611	100.00%	
Valid Ballot Papers		1,916		
Rejected Ballot Papers		17		
Ballot Papers Issued		1,933		
Registered Electors		3,786		
Turnout		51.06%		

Ightham Ward (1)
Candidate	Party	Votes	%
Rodney Chartres	Conservative Party	632	79.70%
Paul Raymond Rootes	Liberal Democrats	161	20.30%
Total		793	100.00%
Rejected Ballot Papers		7	
Ballot Papers Issued		800	
Registered Electors		1,565	
Turnout		51.12%	

Judd Ward (2)
Candidate	Party	Votes	% (Total)	% (Valid)
Peter Francis Bolt	Conservative Party	1,025	35.93%	64.71%
David John Cure	Conservative Party	798	27.97%	50.38%
Reuben Ames	Labour Party	321	11.25%	20.26%
Patricia Townend	Labour Party	307	10.76%	19.38%
Robert William George Oliver	Green Party	209	7.33%	13.19%
Peter Rodney Wood	Liberal Democrats	193	6.76%	12.18%
Total		2,853	100.00%	
Valid Ballot Papers		1,584		
Rejected Ballot Papers		14		
Ballot Papers Issued		1,598		
Registered Electors		3,425		
Turnout		46.66%		

Kings Hill Ward (2)
Candidate	Party	Votes	% (Total)	% (Valid)
Christopher Brown	Conservative Party	1,419	40.55%	73.18%
Trevor John Robins	Conservative Party	1,204	34.41%	62.09%
Nigel James Holland	Liberal Democrats	237	6.77%	12.22%
Kathleen Maria Garlick	Labour Party	236	6.74%	12.17%
Terence Pullinger	Labour Party	236	6.74%	12.17%
David Leonard Waller	UK Independence Party	167	4.77%	8.61%
Total		3,499	100.00%	
Valid Ballot Papers		1,939		
Rejected Ballot Papers		23		
Ballot Papers Issued		1,962		
Registered Electors		4,870		
Turnout		40.29%		

Larkfield North Ward (2)
Candidate	Party	Votes	% (Total)	% (Valid)
Mike Parry-Waller	Conservative Party	654	25.80%	45.80%
Russ Taylor	Conservative Party	627	24.73%	43.91%
David Thornewell	Liberal Democrats	576	22.72%	40.34%
John Roderick Hastings Celements	Liberal Democrats	456	17.99%	31.93%
Janet Julia Denbow	Labour Party	222	8.76%	15.55%
Total		2,535	100.00%	
Valid Ballot Papers		1,428		
Rejected Ballot Papers		8		
Ballot Papers Issued		1,436		
Registered Electors		3,654		
Turnout		39.30%		

Larkfield South Ward (2)
Candidate	Party	Votes	% (Total)	% (Valid)
Anita Sandra Oakley	Liberal Democrats	580	26.48%	49.32%
Timothy Bishop	Liberal Democrats	508	23.20%	43.20%
Peter John Collett	Conservative Party	390	17.81%	33.16%
Nigel Peter Day	Conservative Party	320	14.61%	27.21%
David Charles Finn	Labour Party	204	9.32%	17.35%
Mark Forgione	Labour Party	188	8.58%	15.99%
Total		2,190	100.00%	
Valid Ballot Papers		1,176		
Rejected Ballot Papers		12		
Ballot Papers Issued		1,188		
Registered Electors		3,088		
Turnout		38.47%		

Medway Ward (2)
Candidate	Party	Votes	% (Total)	% (Valid)
Jessica Ruth Louise Elks	Conservative Party	966	32.62%	62.12%
Russell David Lancaster	Conservative Party	899	30.36%	57.81%
Paul Drury	Labour Party	358	12.09%	23.02%
David Buss	Labour Party	334	11.28%	21.48%
Nicholas Sebastian Scott Ford	Liberal Democrats	214	7.23%	13.76%
Clive John Gray	Liberal Democrats	190	6.42%	12.22%
Total		2,961	100.00%	
Valid Ballot Papers		1,555		
Rejected Ballot Papers		17		
Ballot Papers Issued		1,572		
Registered Electors		3,725		
Turnout		42.20%		

Snodland East Ward (2)
Candidate	Party	Votes	% (Total)	% (Valid)
Steven Michael King	Conservative Party	499	26.60%	50.56%
Julian Atkins	Labour Party	465	24.79%	47.11%
David Martin Laverty	Labour Party	456	24.31%	46.20%
Les Withey	Conservative Party	456	24.31%	46.20%
Total		1,876	100.00%	
Valid Ballot Papers		987		
Rejected Ballot Papers		13		
Ballot Papers Issued		1,000		
Registered Electors		2,916		
Turnout		34.29%		

Snodland West Ward (3)
Candidate	Party	Votes	% (Total)	% (Valid)
David Keeley	Conservative Party	963	19.04%	53.35%
Anne Moloney	Conservative Party	961	19.00%	53.24%
Barbara Ann Brown	Conservative Party	947	18.72%	52.47%
Paul Michael Hickmott	Labour Party	870	17.20%	48.20%
Iain Paul Stephen Laverty	Labour Party	670	13.24%	37.12%
Wayne John Mallard	Labour Party	648	12.81%	35.90%
Total		5,059	100.00%	
Valid Ballot Papers		1,805		
Rejected Ballot Papers		22		
Ballot Papers Issued		1,827		
Registered Electors		4,508		
Turnout		40.53%		

Trench Ward (2)
Candidate	Party	Votes	% (Total)	% (Valid)
Jean Atkinson	Conservative Party	677	33.38%	60.28%
Pam Bates	Conservative Party	590	29.09%	52.54%
Robert Baughan	Labour Party	404	19.92%	35.98%
Tania Blackmore	Labour Party	357	17.60%	31.79%
Total		2,028	100.00%	
Valid Ballot Papers		1,123		
Rejected Ballot Papers		14		
Ballot Papers Issued		1,137		
Registered Electors		2,951		
Turnout		38.53%		

Vauxhall Ward (2)
Candidate	Party	Votes	% (Total)	% (Valid)
Maria Frances Heslop	Conservative Party	734	26.06%	49.26%
Sarah Victoria Spence	Conservative Party	654	23.22%	43.89%
Frani Hoskins	Liberal Democrats	450	15.97%	30.20%
Garry Christopher Bridge	Liberal Democrats	335	11.89%	22.48%
James Parish	Labour Party	263	9.34%	17.65%
Kathryn Parish	Labour Party	248	8.80%	16.64%
Stephen Greville Jackson	Green Party	133	4.72%	8.93%
Total		2,817	100.00%	
Valid Ballot Papers		1,490		
Rejected Ballot Papers		7		
Ballot Papers Issued		1,497		
Registered Electors		3,435		
Turnout		43.58%		

Wateringbury Ward (1)
Candidate	Party	Votes	%
Simon Richard Jonathan Jessel	Conservative Party	493	62.56%
David Thomas Mitchelmore	Labour Party	164	20.81%
Stephen James Patt	Liberal Democrats	131	16.62%
Total		788	100.00%
Rejected Ballot Papers		6	
Ballot Papers Issued		794	
Registered Electors		1,579	
Turnout		50.28%	

West Malling & Leybourne Ward (3)
Candidate	Party	Votes	% (Total)	% (Valid)
Sasha Luck	Conservative Party	1,234	22.78%	57.53%
Brian John Luker	Conservative Party	1,147	21.18%	53.47%
Mark Squire Worrall	Conservative Party	1,137	20.99%	53.01%
Yvonne Smith	Liberal Democrats	489	9.03%	22.80%
Julie May Lusher	Liberal Democrats	402	7.42%	18.74%
Jeremy Leslie Teasdale	Labour Party	361	6.67%	16.83%
George Demuth	Liberal Democrats	350	6.46%	16.32%
Peter Graham Stevens	UK Independence Party	296	5.47%	13.80%
Total		5,416	100.00%	
Valid Ballot Papers		2,145		
Rejected Ballot Papers		13		
Ballot Papers Issued		2,158		
Registered Electors		4,479		
Turnout		48.18%		

Wrotham Ward (1)
Candidate	Party	Votes	%
Martin Andrew Coffin	Conservative Party	459	64.47%
Chris Mills	Liberal Democrats	253	35.53%
Total		712	100.00%
Rejected Ballot Papers		10	
Ballot Papers Issued		722	
Registered Electors		1,365	
Turnout		52.89%	
