= 2003 Tonbridge and Malling Borough Council election =

2003 UK local government election

← 1999	1 May 2003	2007 →

All 53 seats up for election 27 seats needed for a majority
	First party	Second party
Leader	Mark Worrall	David Thornewell
Party	Conservative	Liberal Democrats
Seats won	33	13
Seat change	▲6	▼8
- Results of the 2003 Tonbridge and Malling Borough Council election
Leader before election
David Thornewell
Liberal Democrats
Leader-elect
Mark Worrall
Conservative

Elections to Tonbridge and Malling Borough Council were held on 1 May 2003. The whole borough council (53 members) was up for election. Parish council elections were held on the same day.

== Overall results ==
Tonbridge & Malling Borough Council, 2003
Party	Seats	+/-
Conservative Party	33	+6
Liberal Democrats	13	-7
Labour Party	7	-
Total	53	
Valid Ballot Papers		
Rejected Ballot Papers		
Ballot Papers Issued		
Registered Electors		
Turnout		
