= 1999 Tonbridge and Malling Borough Council election =

1999 UK local government election

| ← 1995 | 6 May 1999 | 2003 → |

All 55 seats up for election 28 seats needed for a majority
| | First party | Second party |
|---|---|---|
| Leader | Mark Worrall | David Thornewell |
| Party | Conservative | Liberal Democrats |
| Seats won | 27 | 21 |
| Seat change | ▲4 | - |
Leader before election
David Thornewell
Liberal Democrats
Leader-elect
David Thornewell
Liberal Democrats

Elections to Tonbridge and Malling Borough Council were held on 6 May 1999. The whole borough council (55 members) was up for election. Parish council elections were held on the same day.

== Overall results ==
The council stayed under no overall control. Tonbridge and Malling had been a top target for the Conservatives but they fell one seat short of gaining overall control.

Tonbridge & Malling Borough Council, 1999
| Party | Seats | +/- |
|---|---|---|
| Conservative Party | 27 | +4 |
| Liberal Democrats | 21 | - |
| Labour Party | 7 | -4 |
| Total | 55 | |
| Valid Ballot Papers | | |
| Rejected Ballot Papers | | |
| Ballot Papers Issued | | |
| Registered Electors | | |
| Turnout | | |
