= Wrotham School =

School

Location
- Sevenoaks, Kent, TN15 7RD; England; 51.300°N 0.310°E

Information
- Type: Academy
- Motto: High Expectations, Challenge, Opportunity
- Established: 1949
- Department for Education URN: 139542 Tables
- Ofsted: Reports
- Head teacher: L Abbott
- Gender: Coeducational
- Age: 11 to 18
- Enrollment: Over 1000
- Colours: Black, Dark Aquamarine and Orange
- Website: http://www.wrotham.kent.sch.uk/

Wrotham School is a rural coeducational secondary school and sixth form with academy status, near Sevenoaks, Kent, England. In February 2012 the school was placed in the top 3% nationally. The school converted to academy status in April 2013.
