= Burham Marsh =

Nature reserve in Kent, England

Coordinates: 51.327°N 0.459°E

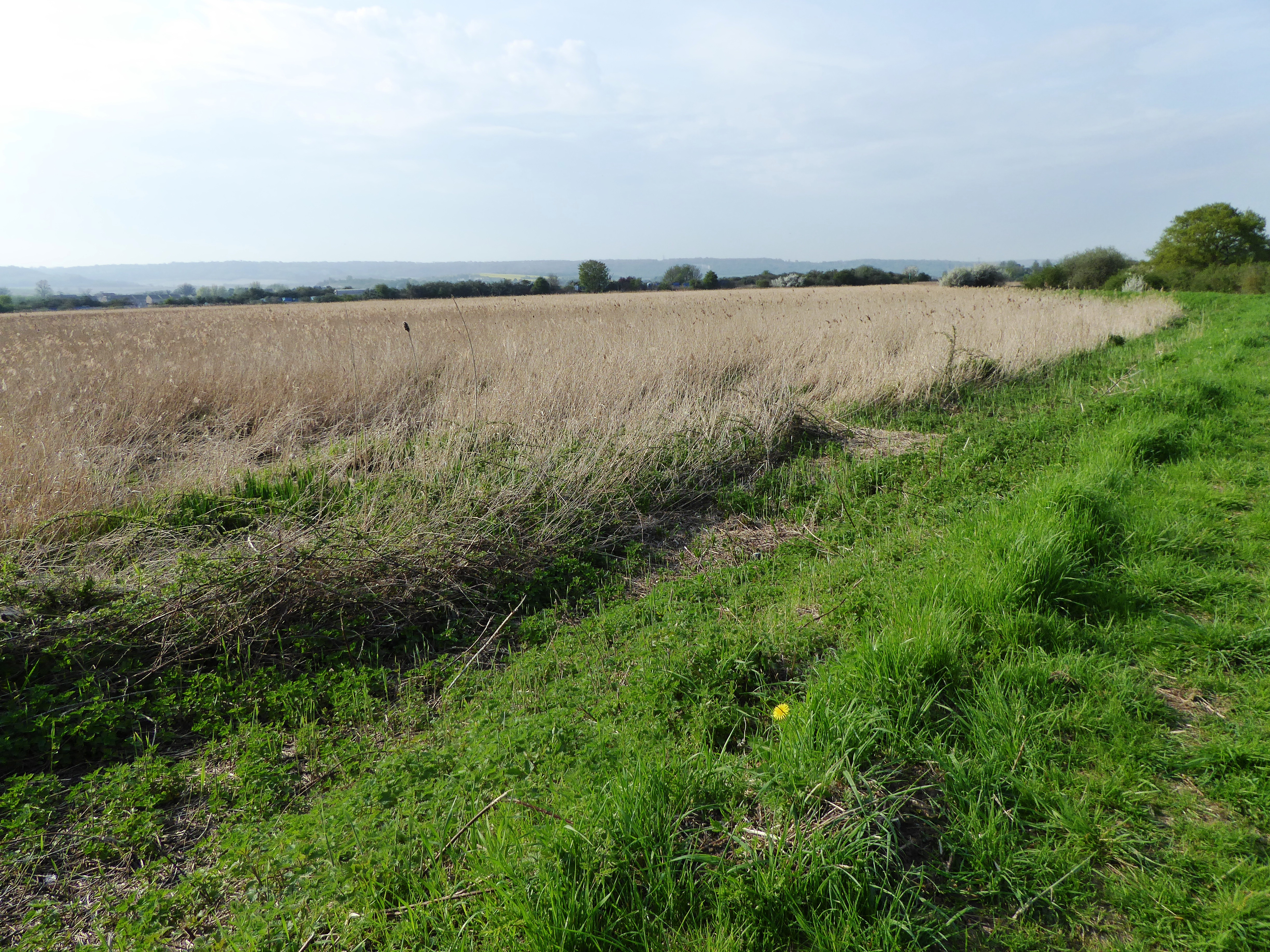
- Interactive map of Burham Marsh
- Type: Nature reserve
- Location: Burham, Kent
- OS grid: TQ 714 615
- Area: 36 hectares (89 acres)
- Manager: Kent Wildlife Trust

Burham Marsh nature reserve is an 11 hectare tidal Reed bed on the River Medway 5 miles northwest of Maidstone. It is just east of Snodland but being on the east bank of the river it is accessed via Burham. It is part the Holborough to Wouldham Marshes Site of Special Scientific Interest.

== Access ==
Cars may be parked at Burham Court Church at TQ 717621. A public footpath runs along the river embankment (the sea wall) from which there are good views of most of the reserve and adjacent meadows.

The path is mostly level but soft in wet weather.

== Fauna and flora ==
Breeding species include reed and sedge warbler and water rail. Wintering species include bearded reedling, snipe, redshank and bittern. During the migration periods significant numbers of swallow and sand martin are seen.

The River Medway at this point attracts a variety of birds including kingfisher, cormorant and various species of duck including teal, shelduck and wigeon. The low lying grassland areas provide grazing and roosting areas for large numbers of geese and ducks, including greylag and wigeon. Herons can often be seen fishing in the dykes which drain this area.

Botanical interest includes the rare marsh sow-thistle (Sonchus palustris) and marsh mallow (Althaea officinalis).
