= 2019 Tonbridge and Malling Borough Council election =

2019 UK local government election

- 2 May 2019

All 54 seats on Tonbridge and Malling Borough Council 28 seats are needed for a majority
- Turnout: 33.66% (Note: Excludes uncontested ward (Downs and Mereworth).)
	Majority party	Minority party	Third party
Leader	Matt Boughton	Anita Oakley
Party	Conservative	Liberal Democrats	Green
Leader's seat	Medway Ward	Larkfield South
Last election	48	4
Seats before	48	4	0
Seats won	39	9	2
Seat change	▼9	▲5
Popular vote	13,976	7,382
Percentage	40.93%	21.62%
- Results of the 2019 Tonbridge and Malling Borough Council election
Leader before election
Nicolas Heslop
Conservative
Elected Leader
Matt Boughton
Conservative

An election was held on 2 May 2019 to elect all 54 members of Tonbridge and Malling Borough Council. Parish council elections were held on the same day.

The Conservatives retained control of the council despite losing seats. The Green Party won their first seats on the council, winning 2 seats in Judd ward.

== Summary ==
=== Election result ===
2019 Tonbridge and Malling Borough Council election
Party	Candidates	Seats	Gains	Losses	Net gain/loss	Seats %	Votes %	Votes	+/−
Conservative	54	39	0	9	▼9	72.2	46.9	31,551	–13.6
Liberal Democrats	27	9	5	0	▲5	16.7	19.5	13,100	+10.4
Independent Alliance (Kent)	4	3	3	0	▲3	5.6	8.6	5,806	N/A
Green	14	2	2	0	▲2	3.7	11.5	7,736	+5.2
Labour	22	1	1	0	▲1	1.9	8.0	5,417	–4.2
Independent	6	0	0	2	▼2	0.0	4.1	2,752	–1.2
UKIP	4	0	0	0	Steady	0.0	1.4	937	–5.1

- Valid ballot papers: 31,130 (98.6%)
- Rejected ballot papers: 431 (1.4%)
- Ballot papers issued: 31,561 (33.7%)
- Registered electors: 93,751

== Ward results ==
=== Aylesford North and Walderslade ===
Aylesford North and Walderslade Ward (Three seats)
Candidate	Party	Votes	% (Total)	% (Valid)
Michael Christopher Base	Conservative Party	1,048	25.19%	67.31%
Des Keers	Conservative Party	1,046	25.14%	67.18%
Andrew Mark Stephen Kennedy	Conservative Party	980	23.55%	62.94%
Liz Simpson	Liberal Democrats	295	7.09%	18.95%
Thomas Richard Shelley	Labour Party	287	6.90%	18.43%
Rizwana Shelley	Labour Party	286	6.87%	18.37%
Shakiba Maryam Shelley	Labour Party	219	5.26%	14.07%
Total		4,161	100.00%	
Valid Ballot Papers		1,557	97.07%	
Rejected Ballot Papers		47	2.93%	
Ballot Papers Issued		1,604	31.07%	
Registered Electors		5,162		

=== Aylesford South ===
Aylesford South Ward (Two seats)
Candidate	Party	Votes	% (Total)	% (Valid)
Steve Hammond	Conservative Party	637	38.08%	71.17%
Colin John Williams	Conservative Party	628	37.54%	70.17%
Julia Susan Taylor	Labour Party	226	13.51%	25.25%
Toni Lesley Beadle	Labour Party	182	10.88%	20.34%
Total		1,673	100.00%	
Valid Ballot Papers		895	95.72%	
Rejected Ballot Papers		40	4.28%	
Ballot Papers Issued		935	24.35%	
Registered Electors		3,840		

=== Borough Green and Long Mill ===
Borough Green and Long Mill Ward (Three seats)
Candidate	Party	Votes	% (Total)	% (Valid)
Tim Shaw	Independent Alliance (Kent)	1,850	27.29%	76.41%
Mike Taylor	Independent Alliance (Kent)	1,751	25.83%	72.33%
Wendy Elizabeth Palmer	Independent Alliance (Kent)	1,637	24.14%	67.62%
Harry Rayner	Conservative Party	575	8.48%	23.75%
Bartosz Marek Wlodarczyk	Conservative Party	490	7.23%	20.24%
Matthew Christopher Botten	Conservative Party	477	7.04%	19.70%
Total		6,780	100.00%	
Valid Ballot Papers		2,421	98.78%	
Rejected Ballot Papers		30	1.22%	
Ballot Papers Issued		2,451	42.81%	
Registered Electors		5,725		

=== Burham and Wouldham ===
Burham and Wouldham Ward (Two seats)
Candidate	Party	Votes	% (Total)	% (Valid)
Dave Davis	Conservative Party	470	33.94%	62.92%
Roger William Dalton	Conservative Party	464	33.50%	62.11%
Steve Beadle	Labour Party	237	17.11%	31.73%
Lola Oyewusi	Labour Party	214	15.45%	28.65%
Total		1,385	100.00%	
Valid Ballot Papers		747	94.08%	
Rejected Ballot Papers		47	5.92%	
Ballot Papers Issued		794	33.63%	
Registered Electors		2,361		

Cage Green Ward (Two seats)
Candidate	Party	Votes	% (Total)	% (Valid)
Nicolas John Heslop	Conservative Party	732	29.62%	57.23%
Mark Osmond Davis	Conservative Party	726	29.38%	56.76%
Denis William Buckley	Green Party	352	14.24%	27.52%
Frances Mary Long	Green Party	325	13.15%	25.41%
Michelle Wallington	Liberal Democrats	172	6.96%	13.45%
Rob Shergold	Liberal Democrats	164	6.64%	12.82%
Total		2,471	100.00%	
Valid Ballot Papers		1,279	98.01%	
Rejected Ballot Papers		26	1.99%	
Ballot Papers Issued		1,305	36.54%	
Registered Electors		3,571		

=== Castle ===
Castle Ward (Two seats)
Candidate	Party	Votes	% (Total)	% (Valid)
Karen King	Conservative Party	640	25.73%	48.01%
Vivian Mary Chimmo Branson	Conservative Party	623	25.05%	46.74%
Robert Adam Songer	Liberal Democrats	342	13.75%	25.66%
Paul Andrew Stepto	Green Party	338	13.59%	25.36%
John Patrick Watson-Reynolds	Green Party	323	12.99%	24.23%
Mary Geraldine Ann Arigho	Labour Party	129	5.19%	9.68%
Julian Thomas Wilson	Labour Party	92	3.70%	6.90%
Total		2,487	100.00%	
Valid Ballot Papers		1,333	98.74%	
Rejected Ballot Papers		17	1.26%	
Ballot Papers Issued		1,350	38.29%	
Registered Electors		3,526		

=== Ditton ===
Ditton Ward (Two seats)
Candidate	Party	Votes	% (Total)	% (Valid)
David John Cooper	Conservative Party	530	29.31%	52.37%
Robert Ireland Blackburne Cannon	Conservative Party	510	28.21%	50.40%
Darren Kent Nicholls	Liberal Democrats	355	19.63%	35.08%
Yan Leon Malinowski	Liberal Democrats	242	13.38%	23.91%
Julia Heather Jenner	Labour Party	171	9.46%	16.90%
Total		1,808	100.00%	
Valid Ballot Papers		1,012	96.93%	
Rejected Ballot Papers		32	3.07%	
Ballot Papers Issued		1,044	27.14%	
Registered Electors		3,847		

=== Downs and Mereworth ===
Downs and Mereworth Ward (Two seats)
Candidate	Party
Frances Ann Kemp	Conservative Party
Piers Justin Montague	Conservative Party

=== East Malling ===
East Malling Ward (Two seats)
Candidate	Party	Votes	% (Total)	% (Valid)
Roger Vincent Roud	Liberal Democrats	1,017	39.27%	75.78%
Michelle Tatton	Liberal Democrats	1,016	39.23%	75.71%
Dan Markham	Conservative Party	249	9.61%	18.55%
Fiona Jane Markham	Conservative Party	235	9.07%	17.51%
Kathleen Maria Garlick	Labour Party	73	2.82%	5.44%
Total		2,590	100.00%	
Valid Ballot Papers		1,342	99.11%	
Rejected Ballot Papers		12	0.89%	
Ballot Papers Issued		1,354	35.47%	
Registered Electors		3,817		

=== Hadlow and East Peckham ===
Hadlow and East Peckham Ward (Three seats)
Candidate	Party	Votes	% (Total)	% (Valid)
Janet Lynne Sergison	Conservative Party	1,144	24.16%	60.27%
Jill Ann Anderson	Conservative Party	1,102	23.27%	58.06%
Howard Seymour Rogers	Conservative Party	986	20.82%	51.95%
Stephen Greville Jackson	Green Party	604	12.76%	31.82%
Jordan Patrick Mahoney	Liberal Democrats	487	10.29%	25.66%
Alan John Willock	UK Independence Party	412	8.70%	21.71%
Total		4,735	100.00%	
Valid Ballot Papers		1,898	99.53%	
Rejected Ballot Papers		9	0.47%	
Ballot Papers Issued		1,907	34.47%	
Registered Electors		5,532		

=== Higham ===
Higham Ward (Two seats)
Candidate	Party	Votes	% (Total)	% (Valid)
Dennis William King	Conservative Party	785	33.62%	58.85%
Frixos Glafcos Tombolis	Conservative Party	608	26.04%	45.58%
Charlotte Louise Stockdale	Green Party	476	20.39%	35.68%
Yvonne Jane Brightmore	Liberal Democrats	279	11.95%	20.91%
Douglas John Ramsay	Labour Party	187	8.01%	14.02%
Total		2,335	100.00%	
Valid Ballot Papers		1,334	99.26%	
Rejected Ballot Papers		10	0.74%	
Ballot Papers Issued		1,344	36.71%	
Registered Electors		3,661		

Hildenborough Ward (Two seats)
Candidate	Party	Votes	% (Total)	% (Valid)
Mark Russell Rhodes	Conservative Party	788	28.35%	52.99%
Nick Foyle	Conservative Party	692	24.89%	46.54%
Richard Paul Mountford	Green Party	336	12.09%	22.60%
Peter Tudor Cooke	Green Party	247	8.88%	16.61%
Helen Rosamund Scott	Liberal Democrats	223	8.02%	15.00%
Chris Scott	Liberal Democrats	194	6.98%	13.05%
Adrian Geoffrey Gilbert	UK Independence Party	174	6.26%	11.70%
Patricia Townend	Labour Party	126	4.53%	8.47%
Total		2,780	100.00%	
Valid Ballot Papers		1,487	99.60%	
Rejected Ballot Papers		6	0.40%	
Ballot Papers Issued		1,493	39.86%	
Registered Electors		3,746		

=== Judd ===
Judd Ward (Two seats)
Candidate	Party	Votes	% (Total)	% (Valid)
Mark Anthony James Hood	Green Party	1,512	40.29%	77.14%
April Elizabeth Clark	Green Party	1,477	39.36%	75.36%
David John Cure	Conservative Party	348	9.27%	17.76%
Tony Lambeth	Conservative Party	272	7.25%	13.88%
Colin Richard Bullen	UK Independence Party	144	3.84%	7.35%
Total		3,753	100.00%	
Valid Ballot Papers		1,960	99.85%	
Rejected Ballot Papers		3	0.15%	
Ballot Papers Issued		1,963	50.89%	
Registered Electors		3,857		

Kings Hill Ward (Three seats)
Candidate	Party	Votes	% (Total)	% (Valid)
Christopher Brown	Conservative Party	887	21.81%	54.65%
Millie Langridge	Conservative Party	770	18.93%	47.44%
Kim Bonita Tanner	Conservative Party	672	16.52%	41.40%
Sarah Muriel Barker	Independent	651	16.01%	40.11%
David Leonard Waller	Independent	474	11.65%	29.21%
Suzanne Elizabeth Burdon	Liberal Democrats	344	8.46%	21.20%
Andrew Peter Russel	Liberal Democrats	269	6.61%	16.57%
Total		4,067	100.00%	
Valid Ballot Papers		1,623	99.39%	
Rejected Ballot Papers		10	0.61%	
Ballot Papers Issued		1,633	25.77%	
Registered Electors		6,336		

=== Larkfield North ===
Larkfield North Ward (Two seats)
Candidate	Party	Votes	% (Total)	% (Valid)
Trudy Dean	Liberal Democrats	839	37.90%	72.20%
David Thornewell	Liberal Democrats	788	35.59%	67.81%
Dougie Dick	Conservative Party	307	13.87%	26.42%
Mike Parry-Waller	Conservative Party	280	12.65%	24.10%
Total		2,214	100.00%	
Valid Ballot Papers		1,162	98.39%	
Rejected Ballot Papers		19	1.61%	
Ballot Papers Issued		1,181	33.23%	
Registered Electors		3,557		

=== Larkfield South ===
Larkfield South Ward (Two seats)
Candidate	Party	Votes	% (Total)	% (Valid)
Anita Sandra Oakley	Liberal Democrats	791	41.37%	78.47%
Timothy Bishop	Liberal Democrats	736	38.49%	73.02%
Tracy Ann Hildrew	Conservative Party	221	11.56%	21.92%
Chris Winn	Conservative Party	164	8.58%	16.27%
Total		1,912	100.00%	
Valid Ballot Papers		1,008	98.63%	
Rejected Ballot Papers		14	1.37%	
Ballot Papers Issued		1,022	29.96%	
Registered Electors		3,411		

=== Medway ===
Medway Ward (Three seats)
Candidate	Party	Votes	% (Total)	% (Valid)
Matt Boughton	Conservative Party	725	15.82%	44.05%
Jon Botten	Conservative Party	697	15.21%	42.35%
James Roger Starling Lark	Conservative Party	624	13.62%	37.91%
Clive John Gray	Green Party	528	11.52%	32.08%
Ralph Martin Ruge	Green Party	418	9.12%	25.39%
Edward Simon Partington	Green Party	370	8.08%	22.48%
Jane Lloyd	Liberal Democrats	333	7.27%	20.23%
Euan Alexander Munro	Liberal Democrats	281	6.13%	17.07%
Sacha Marten	Labour Party	210	4.58%	12.76%
Colin Robert Tarver Hussey	UK Independence Party	207	4.52%	12.58%
Zephanie Ruby Elsie Marten	Labour Party	189	4.12%	11.48%
Total		4,582	100.00%	
Valid Ballot Papers		1,646	99.64%	
Rejected Ballot Papers		6	0.36%	
Ballot Papers Issued		1,652	30.96%	
Registered Electors		5,336		

=== Snodland East and Ham Hill ===
Snodland East and Ham Hill Ward (Two seats)
Candidate	Party	Votes	% (Total)	% (Valid)
Sue Bell	Conservative Party	413	31.34%	53.43%
Ruth Freda Lettington	Conservative Party	373	28.30%	48.25%
Wayne John Mallard	Labour Party	312	23.67%	40.36%
Jane Catherine Ayers	Liberal Democrats	220	16.69%	28.46%
Total		1,318	100.00%	
Valid Ballot Papers		773	98.47%	
Rejected Ballot Papers		12	1.53%	
Ballot Papers Issued		785	21.67%	
Registered Electors		3,622		

=== Snodland West and Holborough Lakes ===
Snodland West and Holborough Lakes Ward (Three seats)
Candidate	Party	Votes	% (Total)	% (Valid)
Paul Michael Hickmott	Labour Party	640	18.54%	52.12%
Alan Peter John Keeley	Conservative Party	614	17.79%	50.00%
David Lettington	Conservative Party	602	17.44%	49.02%
Ian Lee Butterfield	Conservative Party	571	16.54%	46.50%
Susan Lesley Shaw	Labour Party	528	15.30%	43.00%
Lea Angeline West	Labour Party	497	14.40%	40.47%
Total		3,452	100.00%	
Valid Ballot Papers		1,228	97.46%	
Rejected Ballot Papers		32	2.54%	
Ballot Papers Issued		1,260	26.45%	
Registered Electors		4,767		

=== Trench ===
Trench Ward (Two seats)
Candidate	Party	Votes	% (Total)	% (Valid)
Pam Bates	Conservative Party	464	26.30%	45.40%
Georgina Elizabeth Thomas	Conservative Party	460	26.08%	45.01%
Stacey Dean Pilgrim	Independent	366	20.75%	35.81%
Carl Anthony Marten	Labour Party	240	13.61%	23.48%
Simon Richardson	Labour Party	234	13.27%	22.90%
Total		1,764	100.00%	
Valid Ballot Papers		1,022	98.65%	
Rejected Ballot Papers		14	1.35%	
Ballot Papers Issued		1,036	28.90%	
Registered Electors		3,585		

=== Vauxhall ===
Vauxhall Ward (Two seats)
Candidate	Party	Votes	% (Total)	% (Valid)
Frances Annabel Hoskins	Liberal Democrats	858	33.15%	64.90%
Garry Christopher Bridge	Liberal Democrats	759	29.33%	57.41%
Maria Frances Heslop	Conservative Party	526	20.32%	39.79%
Carl Michael Lewis	Conservative Party	445	17.19%	33.66%
Total		2,588	100.00%	
Valid Ballot Papers		1,322	97.49%	
Rejected Ballot Papers		34	2.51%	
Ballot Papers Issued		1,356	35.40%	
Registered Electors		3,831		

=== Wateringbury ===
Wateringbury Ward (One seat)
Candidate	Party	Votes	%
Sarah Anne Hudson	Conservative Party	325	48.65%
Mark James Burrows	Independent	255	38.17%
Siobhan Catherine Sharp	Liberal Democrats	88	13.17%
Total		668	100.00%
Rejected Ballot Papers		6	0.89%
Ballot Papers Issued		674	41.76%
Registered Electors		1,614	

West Malling and Leybourne Ward (Three seats)
Candidate	Party	Votes	% (Total)	% (Valid)
Brian John Luker	Conservative Party	833	15.30%	40.03%
Lee O'Toole	Conservative Party	743	13.65%	35.70%
Nick Stapleton	Liberal Democrats	739	13.58%	35.51%
Zeenara Najam	Conservative Party	715	13.14%	34.36%
Nicholas Alasdair Laurence Taplin	Liberal Democrats	661	12.14%	31.76%
Bob Ulph	Independent	613	11.26%	29.46%
Bill Banks	Liberal Democrats	608	11.17%	29.22%
Neil Christopher Harrison	Independent	393	7.22%	18.89%
John Alexander Hobson	Labour Party	138	2.54%	6.63%
Total		5,443	100.00%	
Valid Ballot Papers		2,081	100.00%	
Rejected Ballot Papers		0	0.00%	
Ballot Papers Issued		2,081	37.18%	
Registered Electors		5,597		

Wrotham, Ightham and Stansted Ward (Two seats)
Candidate	Party	Votes	% (Total)	% (Valid)
Robin Patrick Betts	Conservative Party	715	30.65%	53.68%
Martin Andrew Coffin	Conservative Party	620	26.58%	46.55%
Scott Michael Millener	Independent Alliance (Kent)	568	24.35%	42.64%
Laura Roberts	Green Party	430	18.43%	32.28%
Total		2,333	100.00%	
Valid Ballot Papers		1,332	99.63%	
Rejected Ballot Papers		5	0.37%	
Ballot Papers Issued		1,337	38.75%	
Registered Electors		3,450		

== By-elections ==
=== Castle ===
Castle: 9 December 2021
Party	Candidate	Votes	%	±%
Green	Anna Cope	731	59.3	+36.0
Conservative	Johurul Islam	454	36.8	−7.3
Labour	Julian Wilson	48	3.9	−5.0
Majority		277	22.5	
Turnout		1,233	34.7	
Green gain from Conservative		Swing	▲21.7	

=== Kings Hill ===
Kings Hill: 9 December 2021
Party	Candidate	Votes	%	±%
Conservative	Dan Harman	740	59.3	+21.7
Independent	Louis Westlake	316	25.3	N/A
Liberal Democrats	Raja Zahidi	191	15.3	+0.7
Majority		424	34.0	
Turnout		1,247	18.6	
Conservative hold		Swing	▼1.8	

=== West Malling & Leybourne ===
West Malling & Leybourne: 9 December 2021
Party	Candidate	Votes	%	±%
Liberal Democrats	Paul Boxall	776	49.6	+22.3
Conservative	David Thompson	624	39.8	+9.2
Green	Jordan Mahoney	137	8.7	N/A
Labour	Robin Potter	29	1.9	−3.2
Majority		152	9.8	
Turnout		1,566	27.6	
Liberal Democrats gain from Conservative		Swing	▲6.6	
