= The Malling School =

Location
- Beech Road; East Malling, Kent County Council, ME19 6DH; England
- Coordinates: 51.2904°N 0.4329°E

Information
- Type: Foundation high school
- Motto: Caring, Determined, Reflective
- Local authority: Kent
- Department for Education URN: 118897 Tables
- Ofsted: Reports
- Headteacher: John Vennart
- Gender: Mixed
- Age: 11 to 18
- Education system: The Malling School Way
- Houses: Russet, Bramley, Tydeman, Building C3 (aka Sports Hall), Pippin
- Colours: White and blue
- Website: School homepage

The Malling School is a mixed high school located in East Malling in the English county of Kent.

== History ==
It opened as Clare Park Secondary School in 1957, designed by Read & McDermott.

== Present day ==
It is a foundation school administered by Kent County Council, who coordinate admissions to the school.

The Malling School offers GCSEs and BTECs as programmes of study for pupils at Key Stage 4, while students in the sixth form have the option to study International Baccalaureate programmes of study, further BTECs and A-levels.

It was inspected by Ofsted in March 2023 and found to be 'good' with three out of five aspects rated 'outstanding'.

== Description ==
The school is smaller than the average-sized secondary school, with a small sixth form with more boys than girls. Students enter the school with lower previous achievement than average. Most are White British with a below-average proportion of students are from minority ethnic groups. The proportion of students who receive support through the pupil premium is higher than average, and about a quarter of Year 7 students receive catch-up funding for students who failed to attain the nationally expected level in English or mathematics at the end of Key Stage 2. The school has a specially resourced unit, the Tydeman Centre, for 90 students who have statements of special educational needs for speech, language and communication needs.
